= Electoral results for the district of Ipswich West =

Queensland, Australia, district election results

This is a list of electoral results for the electoral district of Ipswich West in Queensland state elections.

== Members for Ipswich West ==
Member	Party	Term
Ivor Marsden	Labor	1960–1966
Vi Jordan	Labor	1966–1974
Albert Hales	National	1974–1977
David Underwood	Labor	1977–1989
Don Livingstone	Labor	1989–1998
Jack Paff	One Nation	1998–1999
Jack Paff	City Country Alliance	1999–2001
Don Livingstone	Labor	2001–2006
Wayne Wendt	Labor	2006–2012
Sean Choat	Liberal National	2012–2015
Jim Madden	Labor	2015–2024
Darren Zanow	Liberal National	2024
Wendy Bourne	Labor	2024–present

== Election results ==
=== Elections in the 2020s ===
==== 2024 ====
2024 Queensland state election: Ipswich West
Party	Candidate	Votes	%	±%
Labor	Wendy Bourne	12,660	38.63	−11.52
Liberal National	Georgia Toft	10,979	33.50	+12.39
One Nation	Brad Trussell	2,968	9.06	−5.66
Greens	Mark Delaney	2,498	7.62	+1.09
Legalise Cannabis	Harmony Lindsay	1,711	5.22	+0.68
Family First	Beverley Byrnes	1,458	4.45	+4.45
Libertarian	Anthony Bull	497	1.52	+1.52
Total formal votes		32,771	94.89	−1.10
Informal votes		1,763	5.11	+1.10
Turnout		34,534	87.44	+0.68
Two-party-preferred result
Labor	Wendy Bourne	17,672	53.93	−10.42
Liberal National	Georgia Toft	15,099	46.07	+10.42
Labor gain from Liberal National		Swing	−10.42	

==== 2024 by-election ====
2024 Ipswich West state by-election
Party	Candidate	Votes	%	±%
Liberal National	Darren Zanow	11,676	39.53	+18.42
Labor	Wendy Bourne	10,349	35.04	−15.11
Legalise Cannabis	Melody Lindsay	4,302	14.57	+10.03
One Nation	Mark Bone	3,206	10.86	−3.86
Total formal votes		29,533	93.52	−2.47
Informal votes		2,046	6.48	+2.47
Turnout		31,579	80.69	−6.07
Two-party-preferred result
Liberal National	Darren Zanow	15,801	53.50	+17.85
Labor	Wendy Bourne	13,732	46.50	−17.85
Liberal National gain from Labor		Swing	+17.85	

==== 2020 ====
2020 Queensland state election: Ipswich West
Party	Candidate	Votes	%	±%
Labor	Jim Madden	15,033	50.15	+2.88
Liberal National	Chris Green	6,328	21.11	+4.57
One Nation	Gary Duffy	4,412	14.72	−13.44
Greens	Raven Wolf	1,957	6.53	−1.50
Legalise Cannabis	Anthony Hopkins	1,361	4.54	+4.54
Civil Liberties & Motorists	Clem Grieger	565	1.88	+1.88
Independent	Karakan Kochardy	321	1.07	+1.07
Total formal votes		29,977	95.99	+0.73
Informal votes		1,252	4.01	−0.73
Turnout		31,229	86.76	−2.08
Two-party-preferred result
Labor	Jim Madden	19,289	64.35	+2.70
Liberal National	Chris Green	10,688	35.65	−2.70
Labor hold		Swing	+2.70	

=== Elections in the 2010s ===
2017 Queensland state election: Ipswich West
Party	Candidate	Votes	%	±%
Labor	Jim Madden	13,560	47.3	−0.1
One Nation	Brad Trussell	8,078	28.2	+19.8
Liberal National	Anna O'Neill	4,746	16.5	−18.1
Greens	Keith Muller	2,303	8.0	+2.0
Total formal votes		28,687	95.3	−2.7
Informal votes		1,427	4.7	+2.7
Turnout		30,114	88.8	+2.9
Two-candidate-preferred result
Labor	Jim Madden	16,844	58.7	−0.4
One Nation	Brad Trussell	11,843	41.3	+41.3
Labor hold		Swing	−0.4	

2015 Queensland state election: Ipswich West
Party	Candidate	Votes	%	±%
Labor	Jim Madden	14,025	45.66	+13.83
Liberal National	Sean Choat	10,911	35.52	−8.02
One Nation	Christopher Reynolds	3,076	10.01	+10.01
Greens	Ian Simons	1,782	5.80	−0.52
Independent	Leo Talty	925	3.01	+3.01
Total formal votes		30,719	97.98	+0.23
Informal votes		632	2.02	−0.23
Turnout		31,351	91.09	−2.15
Two-party-preferred result
Labor	Jim Madden	16,376	57.71	+14.87
Liberal National	Sean Choat	11,998	42.29	−14.87
Labor gain from Liberal National		Swing	+14.87	

2012 Queensland state election: Ipswich West
Party	Candidate	Votes	%	±%
Liberal National	Sean Choat	12,424	43.54	+6.18
Labor	Wayne Wendt	9,083	31.83	−22.16
Katter's Australian	Justin Bowman	5,225	18.31	+18.31
Greens	Ursula Monsiegneur	1,804	6.32	−2.33
Total formal votes		28,536	97.75	−0.37
Informal votes		657	2.25	+0.37
Turnout		29,193	93.24	+0.23
Two-party-preferred result
Liberal National	Sean Choat	14,146	57.16	+16.71
Labor	Wayne Wendt	10,600	42.84	−16.71
Liberal National gain from Labor		Swing	+16.71	

=== Elections in the 2000s ===
2009 Queensland state election: Ipswich West
Party	Candidate	Votes	%	±%
Labor	Wayne Wendt	14,518	54.0	−0.2
Liberal National	Sean Choat	10,047	37.4	+6.1
Greens	Di Clark	2,327	8.7	+1.7
Total formal votes		26,892	97.9	
Informal votes		516	2.1	
Turnout		27,408	93.0	
Two-party-preferred result
Labor	Wayne Wendt	15,370	59.5	−3.2
Liberal National	Sean Choat	10,442	40.5	+3.2
Labor hold		Swing	−3.2	

2006 Queensland state election: Ipswich West
Party	Candidate	Votes	%	±%
Labor	Wayne Wendt	13,073	54.5	+5.5
Liberal	Sean Choat	7,410	30.9	−0.6
Greens	Bill Livermore	1,694	7.1	+2.4
Family First	Barbara Brown	1,379	5.7	+5.7
Independent	Brian Branch	440	1.8	+1.8
Total formal votes		23,996	97.5	−0.5
Informal votes		610	2.5	+0.5
Turnout		24,606	92.4	−0.8
Two-party-preferred result
Labor	Wayne Wendt	14,005	63.1	+3.7
Liberal	Sean Choat	8,185	36.9	−3.7
Labor hold		Swing	+3.7	

2004 Queensland state election: Ipswich West
Party	Candidate	Votes	%	±%
Labor	Don Livingstone	11,720	49.0	+3.1
Liberal	Jean Bray	7,536	31.5	+31.5
One Nation	Alan Price	3,090	12.9	−12.7
Greens	Sarai O'Reilly-Reis	1,134	4.7	+0.4
Independent	Michael Ward	449	1.9	+1.9
Total formal votes		23,929	98.0	−0.4
Informal votes		481	2.0	+0.4
Turnout		24,410	93.2	−1.5
Two-party-preferred result
Labor	Don Livingstone	12,678	59.4	+2.1
Liberal	Jean Bray	8,661	40.6	+40.6
Labor hold		Swing	+2.1	

2001 Queensland state election: Ipswich West
Party	Candidate	Votes	%	±%
Labor	Don Livingstone	10,768	45.9	+7.0
One Nation	Bob Dutton	6,002	25.6	−14.2
National	David Pahlke	4,469	19.1	+0.4
City Country Alliance	Jack Paff	1,200	5.1	+5.1
Greens	Ben Glass	1,016	4.3	+3.6
Total formal votes		23,455	98.4	
Informal votes		390	1.6	
Turnout		23,845	94.7	
Two-candidate-preferred result
Labor	Don Livingstone	11,645	57.3	+11.5
One Nation	Bob Dutton	8,679	42.7	−11.5
Labor gain from One Nation		Swing	+11.5	

=== Elections in the 1990s ===
1998 Queensland state election: Ipswich West
Party	Candidate	Votes	%	±%
Labor	Don Livingstone	9,658	41.9	−8.9
One Nation	Jack Paff	8,900	38.6	+38.6
National	Sue Wykes	4,065	17.6	−17.7
Reform	Lance Schloss	416	1.8	+1.8
Total formal votes		23,039	98.8	+1.0
Informal votes		291	1.2	−1.0
Turnout		23,330	95.0	+1.1
Two-candidate-preferred result
One Nation	Jack Paff	11,444	51.9	+51.9
Labor	Don Livingstone	10,626	48.1	−7.3
One Nation gain from Labor		Swing	+51.9	

1995 Queensland state election: Ipswich West
Party	Candidate	Votes	%	±%
Labor	Don Livingstone	11,312	50.8	−8.3
National	Jack Else	7,873	35.3	+11.9
Independent	Paul Vaughan	3,090	13.9	+13.9
Total formal votes		22,275	97.8	+0.7
Informal votes		511	2.2	−0.7
Turnout		22,786	93.9	
Two-party-preferred result
Labor	Don Livingstone	12,008	55.5	−7.2
National	Jack Else	9,630	44.5	+7.2
Labor hold		Swing	−7.2	

1992 Queensland state election: Ipswich West
Party	Candidate	Votes	%	±%
Labor	Don Livingstone	12,497	59.1	+1.2
National	Jack Else	4,958	23.4	+18.3
Liberal	Pat Moore	3,696	17.5	−17.5
Total formal votes		21,151	97.1	
Informal votes		633	2.9	
Turnout		21,784	93.1	
Two-party-preferred result
Labor	Don Livingstone	12,882	62.7	+3.8
National	Jack Else	7,676	37.3	+37.3
Labor hold		Swing	+3.8	

=== Elections in the 1980s ===
1989 Queensland state election: Ipswich West
Party	Candidate	Votes	%	±%
Labor	Don Livingstone	12,434	62.1	+5.9
Liberal	Ken Clift	7,600	37.9	+20.1
Total formal votes		20,034	95.8	−2.1
Informal votes		888	4.2	+2.1
Turnout		20,922	91.8	+1.7
Labor hold		Swing	+0.9	

1986 Queensland state election: Ipswich West
Party	Candidate	Votes	%	±%
Labor	David Underwood	10,269	56.2	+0.5
National	Neil Russell	4,755	26.0	−4.2
Liberal	Ken Clift	3,247	17.8	+5.5
Total formal votes		18,271	97.9	
Informal votes		399	2.1	
Turnout		18,670	90.1	
Two-party-preferred result
Labor	David Underwood	11,182	61.2	+2.3
National	Neil Russell	7,089	38.8	−2.3
Labor hold		Swing	+2.3	

1983 Queensland state election: Ipswich West
Party	Candidate	Votes	%	±%
Labor	David Underwood	9,564	55.7	+3.4
National	John Roberts	5,191	30.2	+12.9
Liberal	Christopher Tankey	2,106	12.3	−18.1
Independent	Geoffrey Snell	301	1.8	+1.8
Total formal votes		17,162	98.9	0.0
Informal votes		189	1.1	0.0
Turnout		17,351	91.9	+4.1
Two-party-preferred result
Labor	David Underwood	10,185	59.4	+5.3
National	John Roberts	6,977	40.6	+40.6
Labor hold		Swing	+5.3	

1980 Queensland state election: Ipswich West
Party	Candidate	Votes	%	±%
Labor	David Underwood	8,280	52.3	−0.1
Liberal	Lawrence Pointing	4,814	30.4	+16.8
National	Neil Russell	2,742	17.3	−16.7
Total formal votes		15,836	98.9	0.0
Informal votes		180	1.1	0.0
Turnout		16,016	87.8	−3.4
Two-party-preferred result
Labor	David Underwood	8,573	54.1	−0.2
Liberal	Lawrence Pointing	7,263	45.9	+45.9
Labor hold		Swing	−0.2	

=== Elections in the 1970s ===
1977 Queensland state election: Ipswich West
Party	Candidate	Votes	%	±%
Labor	David Underwood	7,776	52.4	+6.4
National	Albert Hales	5,042	34.0	+8.6
Liberal	Barry Spark	2,025	13.6	−9.9
Total formal votes		14,843	98.9	
Informal votes		161	1.1	
Turnout		15,004	91.2	
Two-party-preferred result
Labor	David Underwood	8,059	54.3	+5.4
National	Albert Hales	6,784	45.7	−5.4
Labor gain from National		Swing	+5.4	

1974 Queensland state election: Ipswich West
Party	Candidate	Votes	%	±%
Labor	Vi Jordan	6,028	46.0	−11.9
National	Albert Hales	3,328	25.4	+25.4
Liberal	Ronda Herrmann	3,075	23.5	−0.5
Queensland Labor	John Dredge	676	5.2	−2.4
Total formal votes		13,107	98.2	−0.3
Informal votes		233	1.8	+0.3
Turnout		13,340	92.1	+0.2
Two-party-preferred result
National	Albert Hales	6,622	50.5	+12.0
Labor	Vi Jordan	6,485	49.5	−12.0
National gain from Labor		Swing	+12.0	

1972 Queensland state election: Ipswich West
Party	Candidate	Votes	%	±%
Labor	Vi Jordan	6,781	57.9	+4.2
Liberal	Allan Whybird	2,806	24.0	−12.6
Independent	Robert Maxwell	1,233	10.5	+10.5
Queensland Labor	Ernest Devin	887	7.6	−2.2
Total formal votes		11,707	98.5	
Informal votes		174	1.5	
Turnout		11,881	91.9	
Two-party-preferred result
Labor	Vi Jordan	7,202	61.5	+6.2
Liberal	Allan Whybird	4,505	38.5	−6.2
Labor hold		Swing	+6.2	

=== Elections in the 1960s ===
1969 Queensland state election: Ipswich West
Party	Candidate	Votes	%	±%
Labor	Vi Jordan	7,128	53.7	+6.2
Liberal	Allan Whybird	4,861	36.6	+18.1
Queensland Labor	Francis Carroll	1,296	9.8	+7.5
Total formal votes		13,285	98.2	−0.5
Informal votes		239	1.8	+0.5
Turnout		13,524	90.9	+0.5
Two-party-preferred result
Labor	Vi Jordan	7,483	56.3	−11.3
Liberal	Allan Whybird	5,802	43.7	+11.3
Labor hold		Swing	−11.3	

1966 Queensland state election: Ipswich West
Party	Candidate	Votes	%	±%
Labor	Vi Jordan	6,211	47.5	−16.3
Independent	James Finimore	4,140	31.7	+31.7
Liberal	Allan Whybird	2,421	18.5	−12.4
Queensland Labor	Leonard Maguire	305	2.3	−3.1
Total formal votes		13,077	98.7	−0.3
Informal votes		170	1.3	+0.3
Turnout		13,247	90.4	−2.6
Two-candidate-preferred result
Labor	Vi Jordan	6,652	50.9	−13.9
Independent	James Finimore	6,425	49.1	+49.1
Labor hold		Swing	−13.9	

1963 Queensland state election: Ipswich West
Party	Candidate	Votes	%	±%
Labor	Ivor Marsden	8,196	63.8	+2.0
Liberal	Jim Cochrane	3,966	30.9	+1.6
Queensland Labor	Len Maguire	688	5.3	−2.5
Total formal votes		12,850	99.0	−0.3
Informal votes		133	1.0	+0.3
Turnout		12,983	93.0	+0.1
Two-party-preferred result
Labor	Ivor Marsden	8,324	64.8	
Liberal	Jim Cochrane	4,526	35.2	
Labor hold		Swing	N/A	

1960 Queensland state election: Ipswich West
Party	Candidate	Votes	%	±%
Labor	Ivor Marsden	7,674	61.8	
Liberal	Harry Groth	3,635	29.3	
Queensland Labor	Selby Guymer	970	7.8	
Communist	Thomas Millar	132	1.1	
Total formal votes		12,411	99.3	
Informal votes		87	0.7	
Turnout		12,498	92.9	
Labor win		(new seat)		
