= 2024 Ipswich City Council election =

- 16 March 2024
- Mayor
	First party	Second party	Third party
	IND	IND	TSI
Candidate	Teresa Harding	David Martin	Sheila Ireland
Party	Ind. LNP	Independent	Team Sheila
Popular vote	54,721	38,029	14,411
Percentage	45.62%	31.7%	14.80%
Swing	▲4.51	▲8.04	▲8.07
TCP	57.73%	42.27%
TCP swing	▼5.25	▲5.25
Mayor before election
Teresa Harding
Independent LNP
Elected mayor
Teresa Harding
Independent LNP
- Councillors
- All 9 members on the City Council (including the Mayor); 5 seats needed for a majority
Party	Leader	Vote %	Seats	+/–
Ind. Labor	N/A	37.07	4	+2
Independent	N/A	19.30	1	0
Your Voice Of Experience	Paul Tully	12.13	2	0
Better Brighter Ipswich	Marnie Doyle; Andrew Fechner	10.50	1	−1
This lists parties that won seats. See the complete results below.

The 2024 Ipswich City Council election was held on 16 March 2024 to elect a mayor and eight councillors to the City of Ipswich. The election was held as part of the statewide local elections in Queensland, Australia.

Teresa Harding was re-elected mayor with 57.73% of the vote after preferences, a swing of 5.25% against her.

== Background ==
At the 2020 election, Teresa Harding was elected mayor, defeating six other candidates. She was the first non-Labor Party aligned Ipswich mayor in 50 years.

Four independents, two Independent Labor candidates and two candidates on the "Your Voice Of Experience" ticket were also elected as councillors.

Division 3 councillor Marnie Doyle joined the Labor Party in March 2023.

== Electoral system ==
Prior to 2020, Ipswich City Council was composed of a directly elected mayor and 10 single-member wards (or divisions), both using optional preferential voting.

In July 2019, it was announced that the 10 single-member wards would be replaced by four two-member wards, reducing the total amount of councillors to eight. Preferential voting was removed and replaced by plurality block voting (also referred to as first-past-the-post by the Electoral Commission), where voters are only required to mark the same amount of candidates as there are positions to be elected − in the case of Ipswich, two candidates.

Optional preferential voting is used for the mayoral election.

== Candidates ==
In April 2023, former councillor David Martin stated he would again run for mayor after his unsuccessful campaign in 2020.

Division 1 councillor Sheila Ireland announced in December 2023 that she would contest the mayoralty and form Team Sheila Ireland.

Marnie Doyle and Andrew Fechner, the two Division 3 councillors, formed the "Better Brighter Ipswich" ticket in early 2024. Former mayor Andrew Antoniolli, who won the 2017 by-election before the council was dismissed in 2018, also contested Division 3 as an independent, having previously been a Labor member.

On 26 January 2024, Ipswich West MP Jim Madden resigned from the Queensland state parliament to contest Division 4. This triggered a by-election in his seat, held on the same day as the local elections.

== Results ==
=== Mayor ===
2024 Queensland mayoral elections: Ipswich
Party	Candidate	Votes	%	±%
Independent LNP	Teresa Harding	54,721	45.62	+4.51
Independent	David Martin	38,029	31.70	+8.04
Team Sheila Ireland	Sheila Ireland	12,857	10.72	+10.72
Independent	Peter Robinson	8,338	6.95	+6.95
Independent	Ken Salter	3,428	2.86	+2.86
Independent	Karakan Kochardy	2,576	2.15	+0.64
Turnout		126,812	81.42	
Two-candidate-preferred result
Independent LNP	Teresa Harding	58,413	57.73	−5.25
Independent	David Martin	42,771	42.27	+5.25
Independent LNP hold		Swing		

=== Councillors ===
2024 Queensland local elections: Ipswich
Party	Votes	%	Swing	Seats	Change
Independent Labor	83,359	37.07	−3.34	4	▲2
Independent	43,406	19.30	+2.81	1	Steady
Your Voice of Experience	27,288	12.13	−8.37	2	Steady
Better Brighter Ipswich	23,613	10.50	+10.50	1	▼1
Working For Our Community	21,621	9.61	+9.61	0	Steady
Greens	15,355	6.83	+6.83	0	Steady
Team Sheila Ireland	10,256	4.56	+4.56	0	▼1
Formal votes	224,898	100.0			
Formal ballots	112,449	89.32	+0.58		
Informal ballots	13,450	10.68	−0.58		
Total	125,899	100.0		8	
Registered voters / turnout	155,753	80.83	+2.87		

=== Division 1 ===
2024 Queensland local elections: Division 1
Party	Candidate	Votes	%	±%
Independent Labor	Jacob Madsen (elected)	16,520	30.17	+11.35
Independent Labor	Pye Augustine (elected)	14,306	26.13	+12.94
Independent	Simon Ingram	13,674	24.97	+10.90
Team Sheila Ireland	Josh Addison	10,256	18.73	−0.91
Turnout		31,171	80.43	+2.00
Independent Labor hold		Swing	+11.35	
Independent Labor gain from Team Sheila Ireland		Swing	N/A	

- Incumbent councillor Sheila Ireland (Independent, later Team Sheila Ireland) ran for mayor and therefore did not recontest.
- Josh Addison compared with Sheila Ireland at the 2020 election.

=== Division 2 ===
2024 Queensland local elections: Division 2
Party	Candidate	Votes	%	±%
Your Voice Of Experience	Paul Tully (elected)	13,953	22.68	+0.81
Your Voice Of Experience	Nicole Jonic (elected)	13,335	21.68	+5.58
Working For Community	Helen Youngberry	10,980	17.85	+17.85
Working For Community	Steven Purcell	10,641	17.30	+7.43
Independent Labor	Neetu Singh Suhag	6,476	10.53	+10.53
Independent Labor	Vincent Do	6,133	9.97	+9.97
Turnout		33,850	81.81	+2.91
Your Voice Of Experience hold		Swing	+0.81	
Your Voice Of Experience hold		Swing	+5.58	

=== Division 3 ===
2024 Queensland local elections: Division 3
Party	Candidate	Votes	%	±%
Better Brighter Ipswich	Marnie Doyle (elected)	12,944	22.69	+1.03
Independent	Andrew Antoniolli (elected)	11,387	19.96	+19.96
Better Brighter Ipswich	Andrew Fechner	10,669	18.70	+6.74
Greens	Danielle Mutton	7,805	13.68	+13.68
Greens	Tracey Nayler	7,550	13.23	+13.23
Independent	David Box	6,695	11.74	+2.44
Turnout		31,850	79.30	+3.49
Better Brighter Ipswich hold		Swing	+1.03	
Independent gain from Better Brighter Ipswich		Swing	N/A	

- Incumbent councillors Marnie Doyle and Andrew Fechner (both independents) formed Better Brighter Ipswich in 2024.

=== Division 4 ===
2024 Queensland local elections: Division 4
Party	Candidate	Votes	%	±%
Independent Labor	Jim Madden (elected)	15,950	30.93	+30.93
Independent Labor	David Cullen (elected)	13,378	25.94	+25.94
Independent	Russell Milligan	11,650	22.59	+4.49
Independent Labor	Sue Dunne	10,596	20.55	+3.05
Turnout		29,028	81.87	+2.98
Independent Labor hold		Swing	N/A	
Independent Labor gain from Independent		Swing	N/A	

- Incumbent councillor Kate Kunzelmann (Independent Labor) did not recontest.
