= Electoral results for the Division of Blair =

Australian division election results

This is a list of electoral results for the Division of Blair in Australian federal elections from the division's creation in 1998 until the present.

== Members ==
Member	Party	Term
Cameron Thompson	Liberal	1998–2007
Shayne Neumann	Labor	2007–present

== Election results ==
=== Elections in the 2020s ===
==== 2025 ====
2025 Australian federal election: Blair
Party	Candidate	Votes	%	±%
Labor	Shayne Neumann	42,825	36.62	+1.61
Liberal National	Carl Mutzelburg	31,797	27.19	−1.70
Greens	Paul Toner	12,104	10.35	−2.23
One Nation	Brendan Kross	11,344	9.70	−0.29
Legalise Cannabis	Anthony Hopkins	5,353	4.58	+4.58
People First	Kathryn Chadwick	4,421	3.78	+3.78
Trumpet of Patriots	Edward McDonald	3,769	3.22	+3.22
Family First	John Purdon	2,334	2.00	+2.00
Animal Justice	Angela Lowery	1,874	1.60	−0.85
Libertarian	Anthony Bull	1,132	0.97	−1.98
Total formal votes		116,953	93.43	−1.27
Informal votes		8,219	6.57	+1.27
Turnout		125,172	88.15	+1.04
Two-party-preferred result
Labor	Shayne Neumann	65,156	55.71	+0.48
Liberal National	Carl Mutzelburg	51,797	44.29	−0.48
Labor hold		Swing	+0.48	

==== 2022 ====
2022 Australian federal election: Blair
Party	Candidate	Votes	%	±%
Labor	Shayne Neumann	36,494	35.01	+3.75
Liberal National	Sam Biggins	30,122	28.89	−0.14
Greens	Danielle Mutton	13,113	12.58	+3.90
One Nation	Liz Suduk	10,419	9.99	−6.81
United Australia	Quinton Cunningham	6,353	6.09	+2.69
Liberal Democrats	Michelle Jaques	3,080	2.95	+2.95
Animal Justice	Angela Lowery	2,563	2.46	+2.46
Australian Values	Maria Pitman	2,103	2.02	+2.02
Total formal votes		104,247	94.70	+2.19
Informal votes		5,832	5.30	−2.19
Turnout		110,079	87.11	−4.23
Two-party-preferred result
Labor	Shayne Neumann	57,575	55.23	+4.02
Liberal National	Sam Biggins	46,672	44.77	−4.02
Labor hold		Swing	+4.02	

Alluvial diagram for preference flows in the seat of Blair in the 2022 federal election. indicates at what stage the winning candidate had over 50% of the votes and was declared the winner.

=== Elections in the 2010s ===
==== 2019 ====
2019 Australian federal election: Blair
Party	Candidate	Votes	%	±%
Labor	Shayne Neumann	29,987	31.26	−9.79
Liberal National	Robert Shearman	27,844	29.03	−0.58
One Nation	Sharon Bell	16,114	16.80	+1.90
Greens	Michelle Duncan	8,325	8.68	+1.97
Independent	Simone Karandrews	3,849	4.01	+4.01
United Australia	Majella Zimpel	3,261	3.40	+3.40
Democratic Labour	John Quinn	2,418	2.52	+2.40
Independent	John Turner	2,118	2.21	+0.06
Conservative National	Peter Fitzpatrick	2,009	2.09	+2.09
Total formal votes		95,925	92.51	−1.92
Informal votes		7,765	7.49	+1.92
Turnout		103,690	91.34	+0.17
Two-party-preferred result
Labor	Shayne Neumann	49,123	51.21	−6.93
Liberal National	Robert Shearman	46,802	48.79	+6.93
Labor hold		Swing	−6.93	

==== 2016 ====
2016 Australian federal election: Blair
Party	Candidate	Votes	%	±%
Labor	Shayne Neumann	35,691	41.90	+0.35
Liberal National	Teresa Harding	24,455	28.71	−5.14
One Nation	Troy Aggett	13,273	15.58	+15.58
Greens	Pat Walsh	5,266	6.18	+1.93
Family First	Geoff Darr	2,406	2.82	−0.04
Independent	Sandy Turner	1,913	2.25	+2.25
Independent	Patricia Petersen	1,439	1.69	+1.69
Independent	Jonathan Emms	744	0.87	+0.87
Total formal votes		85,187	94.33	0.00
Informal votes		5,120	5.67	0.00
Turnout		90,307	91.81	−2.63
Two-party-preferred result
Labor	Shayne Neumann	50,158	58.88	+3.62
Liberal National	Teresa Harding	35,029	41.12	−3.62
Labor hold		Swing	+3.62	

==== 2013 ====
2013 Australian federal election: Blair
Party	Candidate	Votes	%	±%
Labor	Shayne Neumann	32,818	41.55	−0.53
Liberal National	Teresa Harding	26,734	33.85	−3.65
Palmer United	Anthony Stanton	9,805	12.41	+12.41
Greens	Clare Rudkin	3,359	4.25	−6.81
Katter's Australian	Dale Chorley	2,491	3.15	+3.15
Family First	Elwyn Denman	2,257	2.86	−2.05
Australian Independents	Shannon Deguara	1,011	1.28	+1.28
Rise Up Australia	Anthony Mackin	504	0.64	+0.64
Total formal votes		78,979	94.33	+0.21
Informal votes		4,749	5.67	−0.21
Turnout		83,728	94.46	+0.54
Two-party-preferred result
Labor	Shayne Neumann	43,642	55.26	+1.02
Liberal National	Teresa Harding	35,337	44.74	−1.02
Labor hold		Swing	+1.02	

==== 2010 ====
2010 Australian federal election: Blair
Party	Candidate	Votes	%	±%
Labor	Shayne Neumann	30,890	42.08	−9.23
Liberal National	Neil Zabel	27,525	37.50	−2.11
Greens	Patricia Petersen	8,122	11.06	+6.96
Family First	Joshua Olyslagers	3,605	4.91	+2.86
Independent	Brad King	3,267	4.45	+4.45
Total formal votes		73,409	94.12	−2.03
Informal votes		4,589	5.88	+2.03
Turnout		77,998	93.89	−1.10
Two-party-preferred result
Labor	Shayne Neumann	39,814	54.24	−2.74
Liberal National	Neil Zabel	33,595	45.76	+2.74
Labor hold		Swing	−2.74	

=== Elections in the 2000s ===
==== 2007 ====
2007 Australian federal election: Blair
Party	Candidate	Votes	%	±%
Labor	Shayne Neumann	40,663	48.83	+11.99
Liberal	Cameron Thompson	35,133	42.19	−5.17
Greens	Peter Luxton	3,262	3.92	+0.68
Family First	Bevan Smith	1,718	2.06	−1.56
Independent	Dale Chorley	1,429	1.72	+1.72
Democrats	David White	735	0.88	−0.44
Liberty & Democracy	Doug Swanborough	196	0.24	+0.24
Citizens Electoral Council	Robert Theis	143	0.17	−0.41
Total formal votes		83,279	96.13	+2.28
Informal votes		3,352	3.87	−2.28
Turnout		86,631	95.22	−0.54
Two-party-preferred result
Labor	Shayne Neumann	45,369	54.48	+10.17
Liberal	Cameron Thompson	37,910	45.52	−10.17
Labor gain from Liberal		Swing	+10.17	

==== 2004 ====
2004 Australian federal election: Blair
Party	Candidate	Votes	%	±%
Liberal	Cameron Thompson	42,683	52.19	+8.28
Labor	Shayne Neumann	25,709	31.44	+1.06
One Nation	David Chidgey	4,330	5.29	−9.69
Family First	Priscilla Smith	2,982	3.65	+3.65
Greens	Sarai E O'Reilly-Reis	2,406	2.94	−0.20
New Country	Alan Price	1,691	2.07	+2.07
Democrats	Neal McKenzie	1,049	1.28	−2.32
Great Australians	John Bennett	473	0.58	+0.56
Citizens Electoral Council	Rodney Stapleton	458	0.56	+0.29
Total formal votes		81,781	94.22	−0.47
Informal votes		5,019	5.78	+0.47
Turnout		86,800	94.83	−1.09
Two-party-preferred result
Liberal	Cameron Thompson	50,057	61.21	+4.59
Labor	Shayne Neumann	31,724	38.79	−4.59
Liberal hold		Swing	+4.59	

==== 2001 ====
2001 Australian federal election: Blair
Party	Candidate	Votes	%	±%
Liberal	Cameron Thompson	31,933	45.87	+24.17
Labor	Wayne Wendt	19,397	27.86	+2.57
One Nation	Gary Turner	10,467	15.03	−20.93
Democrats	Neal McKenzie	2,284	3.28	−0.35
Greens	Phil Kyson	2,273	3.26	+1.46
Independent	Selwyn Johnston	2,131	3.06	+3.06
Independent	Dan Ryan	921	1.32	+1.32
Citizens Electoral Council	Lindsay Cosgrove	215	0.31	+0.02
Total formal votes		69,621	94.68	−1.72
Informal votes		3,909	5.32	+1.72
Turnout		73,530	96.19	
Two-party-preferred result
Liberal	Cameron Thompson	40,727	58.50	+5.10
Labor	Wayne Wendt	28,894	41.50	+41.50
Liberal hold		Swing	+5.10	

=== Elections in the 1990s ===
==== 1998 ====
1998 Australian federal election: Blair
Party	Candidate	Votes	%	±%
One Nation	Pauline Hanson	24,516	35.97	+35.97
Labor	Virginia Clarke	17,239	25.29	−0.18
Liberal	Cameron Thompson	14,787	21.69	−24.19
National	Brett White	6,989	10.25	−6.91
Democrats	Neal McKenzie	2,478	3.64	−2.13
Greens	Libby Connors	1,230	1.80	−0.43
Independent	Lee Roberts	556	0.82	+0.82
Citizens Electoral Council	Owen Bassingthwaighte	199	0.29	+0.29
Abolish Child Support	Mark Sloan	170	0.25	+0.25
Total formal votes		68,164	96.41	−0.98
Informal votes		2,541	3.59	+0.98
Turnout		70,705	95.28	
Notional two-party-preferred count
Liberal	Cameron Thompson	39,553	58.03	−10.61
Labor	Virginia Clarke	28,611	41.97	+10.61
Two-candidate-preferred result
Liberal	Cameron Thompson	36,398	53.40	−15.30
One Nation	Pauline Hanson	31,766	46.60	+46.60
Liberal notional hold		Swing	−15.30	
