= List of mayors of Ipswich, Queensland =

Mayor of Ipswich
- Incumbent; Teresa Harding since 28 March 2020
- Inaugural holder: John Murphy
- Formation: 1860

This is the list of mayors and chairmen of the City of Ipswich in Queensland, Australia.

Prior to 1921, mayors were elected on an annual basis from amongst the councillors. After 1921, mayors were elected for three year terms, which became four years in 2000.

The title was "chairman" until 1994.

== Mayors ==
=== 1860−present ===
No.	Portrait	Mayor	Party	Term start	Term end	Notes
1		John Murphy (1820−1883)	Independent	1860	1861	Later elected to the Queensland Legislative Assembly for Ipswich
2		John Johnston	Independent	1862	1862	
3		Francis North	Independent	1863	8 August 1864	Died in office
4		John Pettigrew (1832−1878)	Independent	September 1864	1865	Later elected to the Queensland Legislative Assembly for Stanley
(1)		John Murphy (1820−1883)	Independent	1865	1867	Second term
5		Henry Williams (1832−1871)	Independent	1868	1868	Concurrently served in the Queensland Legislative Assembly as the member for Ipswich
6		Harry Hooper	Independent	1869	1869	
7		James Foote (1829−1895)	Independent	1870	1870	Later served in the Queensland Legislative Assembly as the member for West Moreton, Bundamba and Rosewood respectively
8		Samuel Shenton (1829−1803)	Independent	1871	1872	First term
9		Thomas Pryde	Independent	1873	1874	
10		Robert Tallon	Independent	1875	1875	
11		John MacFarlane	Independent	1876	1876	
12		Charles Frederick Chubb	Independent	1877	1877	Solicitor and father of Justice Charles E. Chubb
13		Josiah Francis	Independent	1878	1879	
14		Peter Brown	Independent	1880	1880	
15		John Swain Willey	Independent	1881	1882	
(10)		Robert Tallon	Independent	1883	1883	
(13)		Josiah Francis	Independent	1884	1886	
(14)		Peter Brown	Independent	1887	1888	
(8)		Samuel Shenton (1829−1803)	Independent	1889	1889	Second term
(14)		Peter Brown	Independent	1890	1890	
16		James McGill	Independent	1891	1891	
17		Jacob Spresser	Independent	1892	1892	
18		Denis Thomas Keogh	Independent	1893	1893	
19		Henry E. Wyman	Independent	1894	1894	
(10)		Robert Tallon	Independent	1895	1895	
20		William Thomas Deacon	Independent	1896	1897	
21		Roderick McLeod	Independent	1898	1898	
22		Thomas Baines	Independent	1899	1899	
(14)		Peter Brown	Independent	1900	27 June 1900	Died in office
23		Michael Real	Independent	1901	1901	
24		C. W. L. (Louis) Heiner	Independent	1902	1902	
25		William Henry Summerville (1862−1919)	Labor	1903	1903	Concurrently served in the Queensland Legislative Assembly as the member for Stanley
26		Hugh Reilly	Independent	1904	1904	
27		Isaac Ham	Independent	1905	1905	
28		Frederick Goleby	Independent	1906	1906	
29		Alfred John Stephenson (1845−1914)	Independent	1907	1907	Previously served in the Queensland Legislative Assembly as the member for Ipswich
(20)		William Thomas Deacon	Independent	1908	1908	
30		James Cooper	Independent	1909	1909	
31		Maurice Bowers	Independent	1910	1910	
32		Richard P. Watson	Independent	1911	1911	
33		Alfred Tully Stephenson	Independent	1912	1912	Son of Alfred John Stephenson
34		Rockley Battye	Independent	1913	1913	
(33)		Alfred Tully Stephenson	Independent	1914	1914	Second term
35		Frederick George Springall	Independent	1915	1915	
36		T.J. Smith	Independent	1916	1916	
37		Pearson Welsley Cameron	Independent	1917	1917	
38		Frank Barker	Independent	1918	1918	
39		Edward John Loftus Easton	Independent	1919	1919	
40		John Francis Lobb	Independent	1920	1920	
(33)		Alfred Tully Stephenson	Independent	1921	1929	Third term
41		Oliver Perry	Independent	1930	1932	
(33)		Alfred Tully Stephenson	Independent	1933	29 September 1938	Fourth term. Died in office
42		Allan Godfrey Sutton	Independent	1938	1939	Appointed following Stephenson's death to serve remainder of his term
43		James Charles Minnis (1877-1954)	Independent	1939	1949	
44		James Finimore	Independent	1950	1973	
45		Arthur Hastings	Independent	1973	1979	
46		Des Freeman (1925−2020)	Labor	1979	1991	Retired
47		David Underwood (b. 1951)	Labor	28 March 1991	11 March 1995	Lost re-election
48		John Nugent	Independent Labor	11 March 1995	27 March 2004	Mayor of Moreton from 1994 to 1995
49		Paul Pisasale (b. 1951)	Independent Labor	27 March 2004	6 June 2017	Resigned
50		Andrew Antoniolli	Independent Labor	19 August 2017	21 August 2018	Won by-election. Lost position when council dismissed in 2018
51		Teresa Harding	Independent LNP	28 March 2020	present	Incumbent

== Election results ==
=== 2024 ===
2024 Queensland mayoral elections: Ipswich
Party	Candidate	Votes	%	±%
Independent LNP	Teresa Harding	54,721	45.62	+4.51
Independent	David Martin	38,029	31.70	+8.04
Team Sheila Ireland	Sheila Ireland	12,857	10.72	+10.72
Independent	Peter Robinson	8,338	6.95	+6.95
Independent	Ken Salter	3,428	2.86	+2.86
Independent	Karakan Kochardy	2,576	2.15	+0.64
Turnout		126,812	81.42	
Two-candidate-preferred result
Independent LNP	Teresa Harding	58,413	57.73	−5.25
Independent	David Martin	42,771	42.27	+5.25
Independent LNP hold		Swing		

=== 2020 ===
2020 Queensland mayoral elections: Ipswich
Party	Candidate	Votes	%	±%
Independent LNP	Teresa Harding	40,026	41.11	+41.11
Independent	David Martin	23,037	23.66	+23.66
Greens	Pat Walsh	14,411	14.80	+8.07
Independent Labor	Mark Williams	7,035	7.23	+7.23
Independent	Chris Smith	6,102	6.27	+6.27
Independent Labor	Ursula Monsiegneur	5,276	5.42	+5.42
Independent	Karakan Kochardy	1,466	1.51	+1.51
Turnout		104,879	78.64	
Two-candidate-preferred result
Independent LNP	Teresa Harding	42,542	62.98	+62.98
Independent	David Martin	25,003	37.02	+37.02
Independent LNP gain from Independent Labor		Swing	N/A	

- Changes compared with 2017 Ipswich mayoral by-election

=== 2017 by-election ===
2017 Ipswich mayoral by-election
Party	Candidate	Votes	%	±%
Independent Labor	Andrew Antoniolli	33,285	34.57	
Independent Labor	Paul Tully	29,678	30.83	
Independent	Peter Robinson	6,958	7.23	
Greens	Brett Morrissey	6,476	6.73	
Independent	Gary Duffy	5,770	5.99	
Independent	Dallas Klass	5,669	5.89	
Independent	Patricia Petersen	3,527	3.66	
Independent	Jack Paff	2,531	2.63	
Independent	Paul Rix	1,438	1.49	
Independent	Peter Luxton	522	0.54	
Independent	Ken Salter	415	0.43	
Total formal votes		96,269	96.67	
Informal votes		3,314	3.33	
Turnout		99,583		
Two-candidate-preferred result
Independent Labor	Andrew Antoniolli	39,321	54.44	
Independent Labor	Paul Tully	32,902	45.56	
Independent Labor hold		Swing		
