= 2020 Ipswich City Council election =

- 28 March 2020
- Turnout: 78.64% (mayoral election)
- Mayor
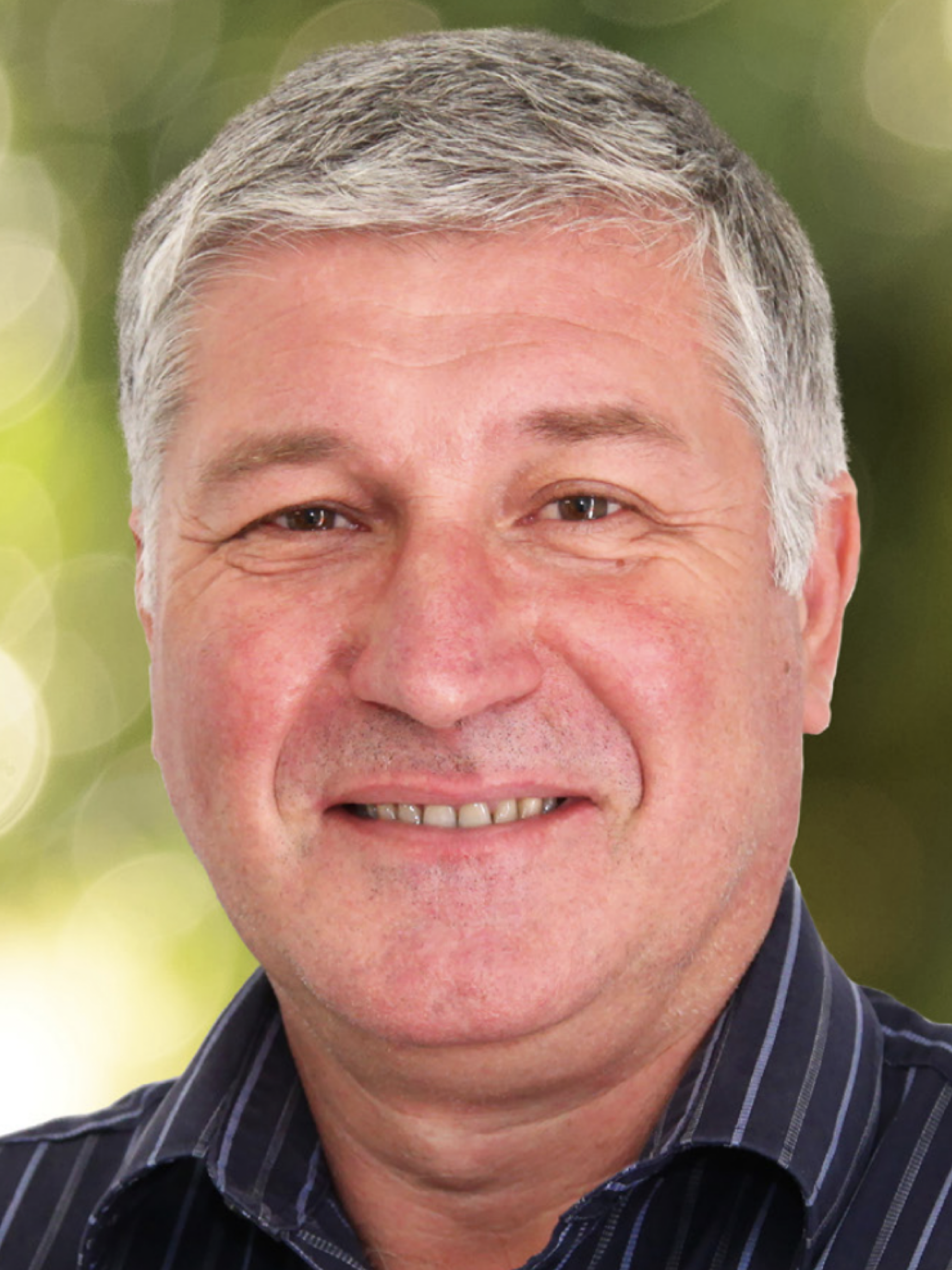
	First party	Second party	Third party
	IND	IND
Candidate	Teresa Harding	David Martin	Pat Walsh
Party	Ind. LNP	Independent	Greens
Popular vote	40,026	25,003	14,411
Percentage	41.11%	23.66%	14.80%
Swing	▲4.51	▲8.04	▲8.07
2CP	62.98%	37.02%
2CP swing	▲62.98	▲37.02
Administrator before election
Greg Chemello
Independent
Elected mayor
Teresa Harding
Independent LNP
- Councillors
- All 9 members on the City Council (including the Mayor); 5 seats needed for a majority
Party	Leader	Vote %	Seats	+/–
Ind. Labor	N/A	40.41	2	−4
Your Voice Of Experience	Paul Tully	20.50	2	+2
Independent	N/A	16.49	4	0
This lists parties that won seats. See the complete results below.

The 2020 Ipswich City Council election was held on 28 March 2020 to elect a mayor and eight councillors to the City of Ipswich. The election was held as part of the statewide local elections in Queensland, Australia.

Teresa Harding was elected mayor with 62.98% of the vote after preferences, becoming the first non-Labor Party aligned Ipswich mayor in 50 years.

The election saw significant changes to the council's electoral system, and followed its dismissal in August 2018.

== Background ==
=== 2017 mayoral by-election ===
On 6 June 2017, mayor Paul Pisasale announced his resignation, citing a decline in his health due to multiple sclerosis. The announcement came one day after his office was searched by the Queensland Crime and Corruption Commission and police.

Andrew Antoniolli was elected mayor with 54.44% of the vote after preferences.

=== 2018 dismissal ===
In May 2018, Antoniolli was charged with seven counts of corruption forcing him to stand down and administrators to take over Ipswich City Council.

In August 2018, the Queensland Government passed legislation to dismiss all Ipswich councillors and replace them with an administrator. The dismissal officially came into effect on 21 August.

Greg Chemello was appointed as administrator to serve for the rest of the term.

== Electoral system ==
Prior to 2020, Ipswich City Council was composed of a directly elected mayor and 10 single-member wards (or divisions), both using optional preferential voting.

In July 2019, it was announced that the 10 single-member wards would be replaced by four two-member wards, reducing the total amount of councillors to eight. Preferential voting was removed and replaced by plurality block voting (also referred to as first-past-the-post by the Electoral Commission), where voters are only required to mark the same amount of candidates as there are positions to be elected − in the case of Ipswich, two candidates.

The electoral system for mayor was unchanged.

== Candidates ==
Teresa Harding, a government contractor and former two-time Liberal National candidate for Blair, contested the mayoral election without any party endorsement.

Two Labor Party members, Mark Williams and Ursula Monsiegneur, contested the mayoral election as Independent Labor candidates.

Pat Walsh was endorsed by the Greens to contest the mayoralty. The Liberal Democrats endorsed two councillor candidates, husband and wife Anthony and Jacinta Bull.

Paul Tully, who served as a councillor for 39 years until its dismissal, led the "Your Voice Of Experience" ticket in Division 2.

== Results ==
=== Mayor ===
2020 Queensland mayoral elections: Ipswich
Party	Candidate	Votes	%	±%
Independent LNP	Teresa Harding	40,026	41.11	+41.11
Independent	David Martin	23,037	23.66	+23.66
Greens	Pat Walsh	14,411	14.80	+8.07
Independent Labor	Mark Williams	7,035	7.23	+7.23
Independent	Chris Smith	6,102	6.27	+6.27
Independent Labor	Ursula Monsiegneur	5,276	5.42	+5.42
Independent	Karakan Kochardy	1,466	1.51	+1.51
Turnout		104,879	78.64	
Two-candidate-preferred result
Independent LNP	Teresa Harding	42,542	62.98	+62.98
Independent	David Martin	25,003	37.02	+37.02
Independent LNP gain from Independent Labor		Swing	N/A	

- Changes compared with 2017 Ipswich mayoral by-election

=== Councillors ===
2020 Queensland local elections: Ipswich
Party	Votes	%	Swing	Seats	Change
Independent Labor	37,280	40.41		2	▼4
Your Voice of Experience	18,917	20.50	+20.50	2	▲2
Independent	15,212	16.49		4	Steady
Team WORK	7,483	8.11		0	Steady
Liberal Democrats	7,433	8.06		0	Steady
Independent LNP	5,931	6.43		0	Steady
Formal votes	184,512	100.0			
Formal ballots	92,256	88.73			
Informal ballots	11,720	11.27			
Total	103,976	100.0		8	▼2
Registered voters / turnout	133,368	77.96			

=== Division 1 ===
2020 Queensland local elections: Division 1
Party	Candidate	Votes	%	±%
Independent	Sheila Ireland (elected)	8,280	19.64	
Independent Labor	Jacob Madsen (elected)	7,936	18.82	
Independent LNP	Simon Ingram	5,931	14.07	
Independent Labor	Pye Augustine	5,560	13.19	
Independent	Kendal Newman	4,535	10.76	
Independent	Jim Thompson	4,155	9.85	
Independent	Conny Turni	2,970	7.04	
Independent	Will Jankovic	2,799	6.64	
Turnout		24,106	78.43	
Independent win		(new ward)		
Independent Labor win		(new ward)		

=== Division 2 ===
2020 Queensland local elections: Division 2
Party	Candidate	Votes	%	±%
Your Voice Of Experience	Paul Tully (elected)	10,896	21.87	
Your Voice Of Experience	Nicole Jonic (elected)	8,021	16.10	
Independent	Steven Purcell	4,916	9.87	
Independent	Sarah Knopke	4,716	9.47	
Independent	Luise Manning	4,642	9.32	
Liberal Democrats	Anthony Bull	3,830	7.69	
Independent	James Pinnell	3,216	6.46	
Independent	Paul Modra	2,666	5.35	
Independent	Andrea Dunn	2,414	4.85	
Independent	Sirle Adamson	2,284	4.59	
Independent	Brad Hunt	2,213	4.44	
Turnout		27,647	78.90	
Your Voice Of Experience win		(new ward)		
Your Voice Of Experience win		(new ward)		

=== Division 3 ===
2020 Queensland local elections: Division 3
Party	Candidate	Votes	%	±%
Independent	Marnie Doyle (elected)	10,398	21.66	
Independent	Andrew Fechner (elected)	5,743	11.96	
Independent	Jim Dodrill	5,041	10.50	
Team WORK	Alyson Lewis	4,924	10.26	
Independent Labor	Toni Gibbs	4,877	10.16	
Independent	David Box	4,466	9.30	
Liberal Democrats	Jacinta Bull	3,603	7.50	
Team WORK	Bill Heck	2,559	5.33	
Independent	Rochelle Caloon	1,942	4.04	
Independent	Darren Close	1,905	3.97	
Independent Labor	Drew Pickwick	1,762	3.67	
Independent	Kevin Le Grice	792	1.65	
Turnout		27,080	75.81	
Independent win		(new ward)		
Independent win		(new ward)		

=== Division 4 ===
2020 Queensland local elections: Division 4
Party	Candidate	Votes	%	±%
Independent Labor	Kate Kunzelmann (elected)	9,354	21.01	
Independent	Russell Milligan (elected)	8,057	18.10	
Independent Labor	Susan Dunne	7,791	17.50	
Independent	Gary Duffy	7,022	15.77	
Independent	Brian Scott	6,695	15.04	
Independent	Shane Blake	5,601	12.58	
Turnout		25,143	78.89	
Independent Labor win		(new ward)		
Independent win		(new ward)		
