= 2017 Ipswich mayoral by-election =

← 2016	19 August 2017	2020 →
	First party	Second party	Third party
	IND	IND	IND
Candidate	Andrew Antoniolli	Paul Tully	Peter Robinson
Party	Ind. Labor	Ind. Labor	Independent
Popular vote	33,285	29,678	6,958
Percentage	34.57%	30.83%	7.23%
2CP	54.44%	45.56%
Mayor before election
Paul Pisasale
Independent Labor
Subsequent Mayor
Andrew Antoniolli
Independent Labor

The 2017 Ipswich mayoral by-election was held on 19 August 2017 to elect the mayor of Ipswich, a local government area in Queensland, Australia.

The by-election was triggered by the resignation of mayor Paul Pisasale on 6 June 2017, who cited a decline in his health due to multiple sclerosis, a day after his office was searched by the Queensland Crime and Corruption Commission and police.

Andrew Antoniolli was elected mayor with 54.44% of the vote after preferences.

== Results ==
2017 Ipswich mayoral by-election
Party	Candidate	Votes	%	±%
Independent Labor	Andrew Antoniolli	33,285	34.57	
Independent Labor	Paul Tully	29,678	30.83	
Independent	Peter Robinson	6,958	7.23	
Greens	Brett Morrissey	6,476	6.73	
Independent	Gary Duffy	5,770	5.99	
Independent	Dallas Klass	5,669	5.89	
Independent	Patricia Petersen	3,527	3.66	
Independent	Jack Paff	2,531	2.63	
Independent	Paul Rix	1,438	1.49	
Independent	Peter Luxton	522	0.54	
Independent	Ken Salter	415	0.43	
Total formal votes		96,269	96.67	
Informal votes		3,314	3.33	
Turnout		99,583		
Two-candidate-preferred result
Independent Labor	Andrew Antoniolli	39,321	54.44	
Independent Labor	Paul Tully	32,902	45.56	
Independent Labor hold		Swing		
