= Patricia Petersen =

Australian academic (born 1964)

Patricia May Petersen is an Australian academic from Ipswich, Queensland.

== Education ==
Petersen holds a Bachelor of Arts from the University of New South Wales and was awarded a Doctor of Philosophy from the University of Queensland in 2002. Petersen has been a lecturer at Central Queensland University.

== Electoral history ==
Petersen has run unsuccessfully for political office thirteen times, and has been referred to as a serial candidate.

Petersen ran as an independent candidate for the federal seat of Warringah in 2004 and 2007. She lost both times to Tony Abbott. Petersen also contested the mayoral election in Manly in 2008, and lost to Jean Hay.

Petersen ran as an independent for the Queensland seat of Bundamba in the 2009 state election, and lost to Jo-Ann Miller.

Petersen contested the seat of Blair at the 2010 federal election as an Australians Greens candidate, and lost to Shayne Neumann.

Petersen contested the seat of Ipswich as an independent in the 2012 Queensland state election, and lost to Ian Berry.

Following her bid to be elected to the Senate for the Australian Independents, Petersen ran as an independent candidate for mayor of Noosa in late 2013. Petersen claimed to have "[s]pent a third of my time on the coast as a child, lived in Peregian in my 20s, have been nurturing land on the coast for 12 years. 4th generation Noosa resident", yet, during her election campaigns in the Ipswich region she has also claimed to "[b]eing a fifth generation member of the Ipswich community, I feel a strong attachment to the historical buildings and sites within the local area. Similar to the way in which aborigines have a deep connection to their land, I am emotionally tied to my home, everything and everyone in it." Previously, she had stated that she "headed off to Sydney to successfully model full-time," and whilst there "completed a BA (HONS) from the University of New South Wales." Petersen lost to Noel Playford.

Petersen again contested the seat of Ipswich as an independent at the 2015 state election. Petersen lost to Jennifer Howard.

After the loss to Jennifer Howard, Petersen told the local Ipswich newspaper, The Queensland Times, in an article dated 31 January 2015 that she would not run for office in the future. Petersen is quoted in the article as saying "But I am hanging my hat up after this," she said. "I have promised my partner I will not do this again."

Despite quitting politics, Petersen ran for Division 3 of Ipswich City Council in 2016, and lost to Kerry Silver.

The Australian Independents was deregistered in February 2016 because it did not show sufficient membership to remain as a registered political party.

Petersen again ran for office at the 2016 federal election for the seat of Blair. Once again she lost, polling the second fewest votes.

Petersen contested the August 2017 Ipswich mayoral by-election, receiving 3.66% of the vote.

Petersen contested the seat of Bundamba at the 2017 state election. Petersen was once again unsuccessful in her attempt, finishing behind all major party candidates.

== Australian Independents ==
Australian Independents
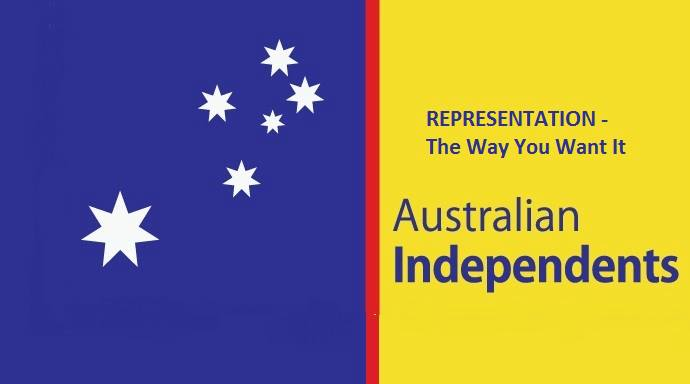
- Leader: Patricia Petersen
- Founded: October 2012
- Registered: 16 July 2013
- Dissolved: 4 February 2016
- Slogan: "REPRESENTATION – The Way You Want It"

In 2012 Petersen started her own political party, the Australian Independents. It was registered with the Australian Electoral Commission on 16 July 2013. In the 2013 federal election, the Australian Independents ran Senate candidates in every state and territory. The party also ran six candidates in the House of Representatives.

In Queensland, with Petersen as lead candidate, the party placed 17th out of the 34 parties that ran, having received 0.48% of the primary vote. Nationally, its senate candidates having received a total of 45,441 first preference votes, 0.34% of the total votes cast. Its House of Representatives candidates received 4,163 first preference votes, 0.03% of votes cast.

The Australian Independents was deregistered by the AEC on 4 February 2016, after failing to demonstrate the requisite 500 members to maintain registration.

== Personal life ==
Petersen has written a self-published book, entitled Morality, Sexual Facts and Fantasies, and has written two plays based on her time running against Tony Abbott in 2004 and 2007.

She has worked as a relationships counsellor, and has worked for Brisbane radio station B105 FM and Sydney radio station 2UE. She was a panellist on the Australian television show Beauty and the Beast.

Petersen has a black belt in karate.
