= Don Livingstone =

Australian politician

Queensland Government Chief Whip
- In office 22 February 1995 – 20 February 1996
- Premier: Wayne Goss
- Preceded by: Warren Pitt
- Succeeded by: Lawrence Springborg

Member of the Queensland Legislative Assembly for Ipswich West
- In office 17 February 2001 – 9 September 2006
- Preceded by: Jack Paff
- Succeeded by: Wayne Wendt
- In office 2 December 1989 – 13 June 1998
- Preceded by: David Underwood
- Succeeded by: Jack Paff

Personal details
- Born: Donald Wallace Livingstone; 1 October 1948 Kingaroy, Queensland, Australia
- Died: 15 October 2015 (aged 67) Ipswich, Queensland, Australia
- Party: Labor
- Education: Darling Downs Institute of Advanced Education
- Occupation: Political advisor

Donald Wallace Livingstone (1 October 1948 – 15 October 2015) was a politician in Queensland, Australia.

== Early life ==
Donald Wallace Livingstone was born in Kingaroy, Queensland on 1 October 1948. He moved to Ipswich at the age of seven. He was married to his wife Cheryl in October 1972; the couple had two children. Livingstone and his wife owned two delicatessens, earning him the nickname "Deli Don".

== Politics ==
Livingstone was a policy advisor to the Minister for Public Works and Housing before entering politics himself. He was the Labor Party's Queensland campaign director 1983–1986, and served on Ipswich City Council from 1985 to 1990. In 1989, he was elected to the Legislative Assembly of Queensland as the Labor member for Ipswich West. In 1998, he was defeated by Jack Paff, the One Nation candidate. Livingstone defeated Paff (running for the City Country Alliance) in 2001, and served until his retirement in 2006.

== Later life ==
Livingstone died from stomach cancer at the Ipswich Hospice on 15 October 2015. Several hundred people attended his funeral at the North Ipswich Reserve on 20 October 2015. At the funeral, Ipswich mayor Paul Pisasale announced that he would honour Livingstone's dying wish to see the hospice's car parking and pedestrian crossing upgraded. He was buried at Warrill Park Cemetery.

== Legacy ==
The bridge over the Bremer River at One Mile/Leichhardt was named the Don Livingstone One Mile Bridge in February 2015.

Parliament of Queensland
Preceded by David Underwood	Member for Ipswich West; 1989–1998	Succeeded by Jack Paff
Preceded by Jack Paff	Member for Ipswich West; 2001–2006	Succeeded by Wayne Wendt
