= Vi Jordan =

Australian politician

Vi Jordan AM

Member of the Queensland Legislative Assembly for Ipswich West
- In office 28 May 1966 – 7 December 1974
- Preceded by: Ivor Marsden
- Succeeded by: Albert Hales

Personal details
- Born: Ellen Violet Perrett; 29 June 1913 Ipswich, Queensland, Australia
- Died: 7 May 1982 (aged 68) Ipswich, Australia
- Resting place: Ipswich General Cemetery
- Party: Labor
- Occupation: Politician

Ellen Violet Jordan AM (née Perrett; 29 June 1913 – 7 May 1982) was an Australian politician. She was the second woman elected to the Queensland Legislative Assembly, and the first representing the Queensland Labor Party.

== Early life ==
Jordan was born on 29 June 1913, in Ipswich, the son of James Berties Perrett and Anne Jane (née Brown) Jordan. She attended Brassall State School and then Ipswich Girls' Grammar School before earning a Diploma of Education and becoming a schoolteacher.

== Politics ==
Joining the Australian Labor Party in 1946, Jordan was a delegate to the Labor-in-Politics Convention in 1956. She was the inaugural president of the Women's Central Committee Queensland from 1956 to 1967 and secretary of the Ipswich Labor Party Executive from 1958 to 1965. In 1961, she became the first woman elected to Ipswich City Council, serving until 1967.

In 1966, Jordan was elected to the Queensland Legislative Assembly as the member for Ipswich West. She was the first Labor woman elected to the Assembly, and the first woman in parliament since Irene Longman's defeat in 1932. Jordan was defeated in 1974, after which she became the inaugural president of the Australian ALP Women's Executive.

== Death and legacy ==
On 14 June 1932, Jordan married David Jordan, with whom she had two children. She died on 7 May 1982, aged 68, in Ipswich. She was buried in the Ipswich General Cemetery alongside her husband, who had predeceased her in 1967. The electoral district of Jordan created in the 2017 Queensland state electoral redistribution was named after her.

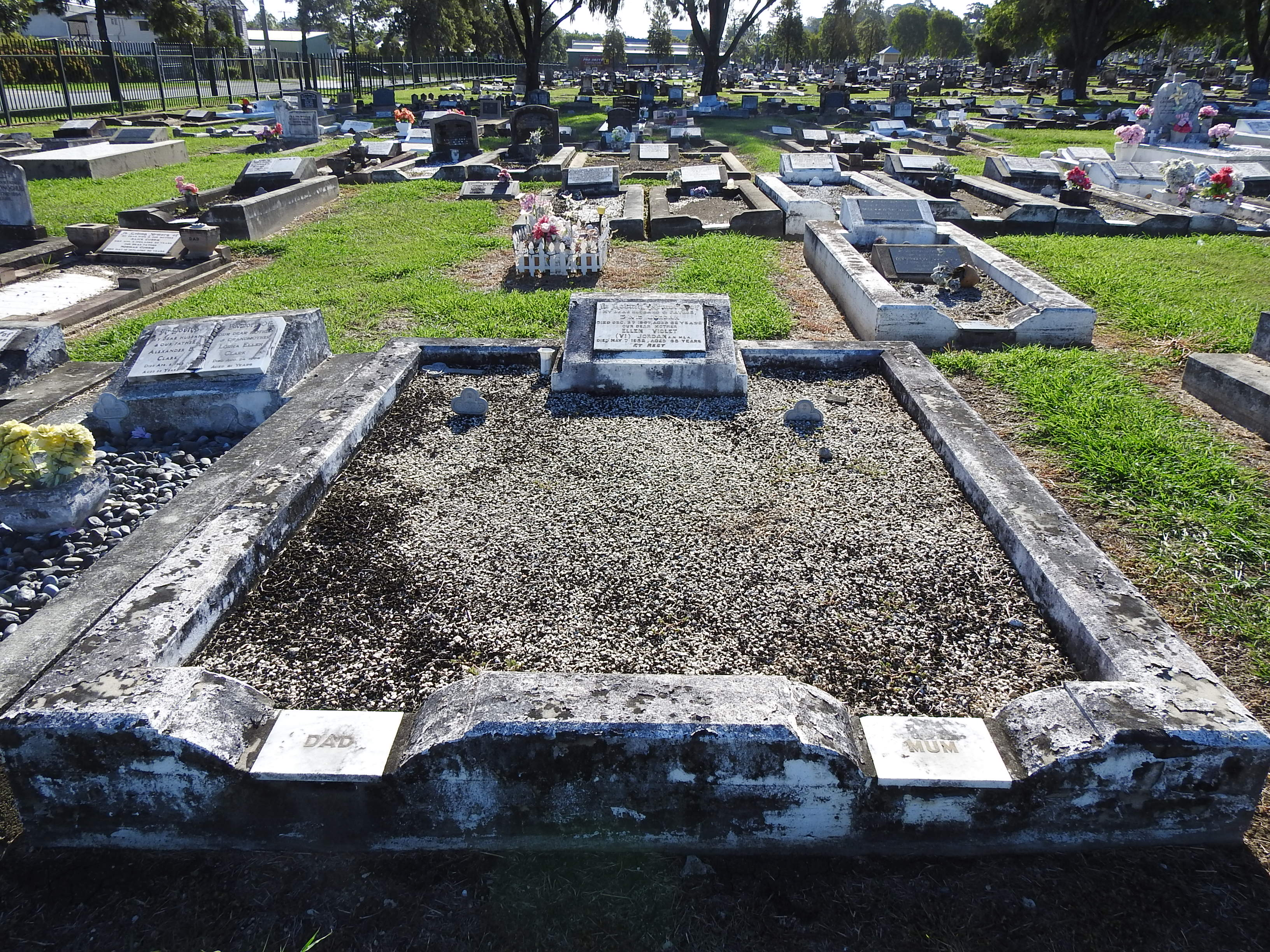
Grave plot

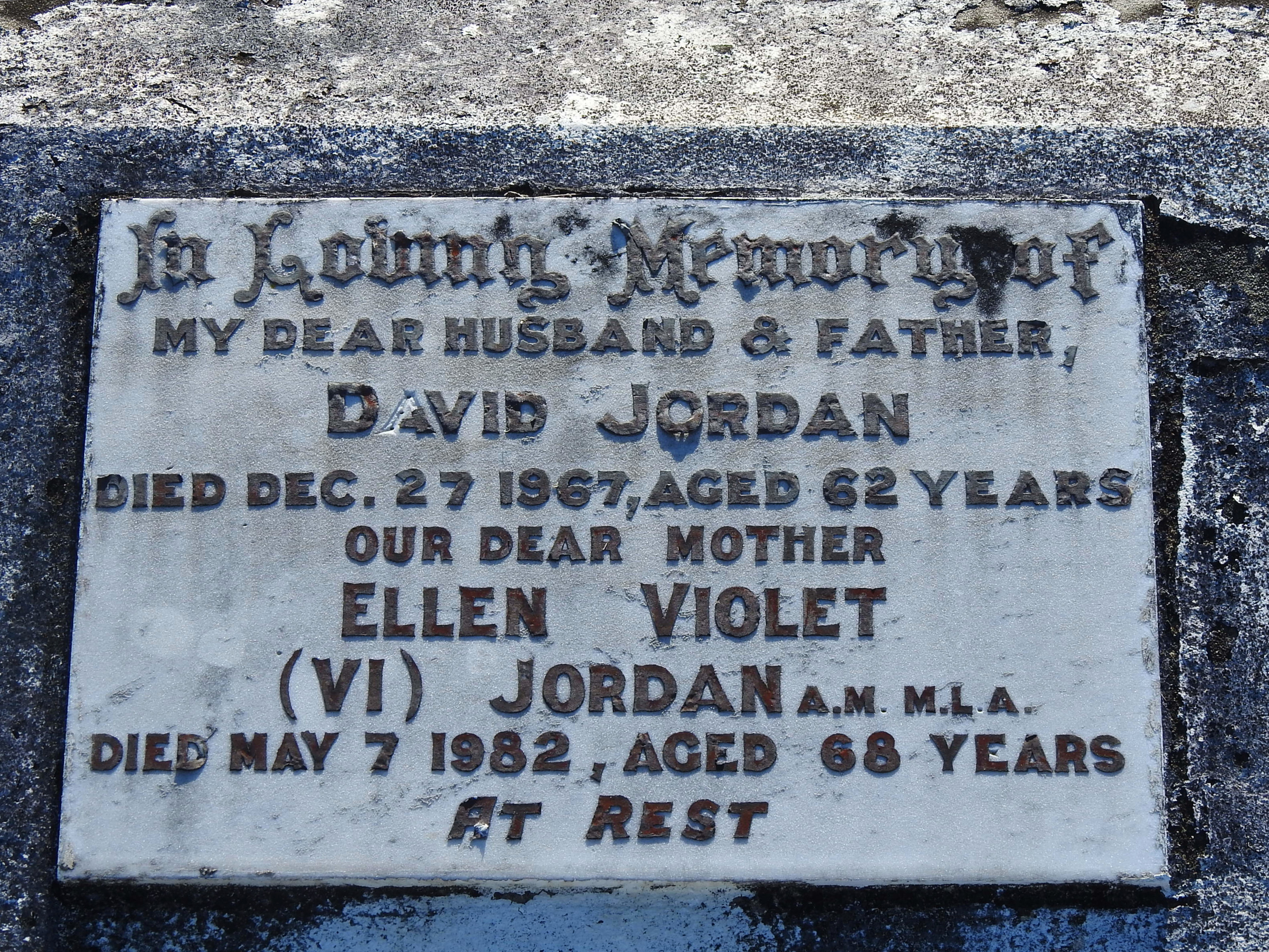
Headstone

Parliament of Queensland
Preceded by Ivor Marsden	Member for Ipswich West; 1966–1974	Succeeded by Albert Hales
