= Ivor Marsden =

Australian politician and police officer

Member of the Queensland Legislative Assembly for Ipswich
- In office 10 September 1949 – 28 May 1960
- Preceded by: David Gledson
- Succeeded by: Seat abolished

Member of the Queensland Legislative Assembly for Ipswich West
- In office 28 May 1960 – 28 May 1966
- Preceded by: New seat
- Succeeded by: Vi Jordan

Personal details
- Born: Ivor Marsden; 11 March 1903 Ipswich, Queensland, Australia
- Died: 18 November 1976 (aged 73) Ipswich, Queensland, Australia
- Party: Labor
- Spouse: Doris Emily Jackson (m.1924 d.1980)
- Occupation: Police officer

Ivor Marsden (11 March 1903 – 18 November 1976) was a police officer and member of the Queensland Legislative Assembly.

== Biography ==
Marsden was born in Ipswich, Queensland, to parents Llewellyn Marsden and his wife Hannah (née Bowen). He attended primary schools in Ipswich before becoming a law clerk in the 1920s. He served in the Australian Army from 1942 to 1945 before becoming a police sergeant based at the Ipswich Police Station.

On 28 June 1924, he married Doris Emily Jackson (died 1980) and they had two sons and four daughters. He died in Ipswich in November 1976.

== Public career ==
Marsden, the Labor candidate, won the by-election to replace the long serving member for Ipswich, David Gledson in 1949. He held the seat until it was abolished for the 1960 Queensland state election. He then won the new seat of Ipswich West, holding it until he retired from politics in 1966.

He was an alderman in the Ipswich City Council for six years from 1943, including the city's Vice-Mayor in 1949.

Parliament of Queensland
Preceded by David Gledson	Member for Ipswich; 1949–1960	Abolished
New seat	Member for Ipswich West; 1960–1966	Succeeded by Vi Jordan
