= Andrew Antoniolli =

Australian local government politician

Councillor Andrew Antoniolli

Mayor of Ipswich
- In office 28 August 2017 – 2 May 2018
- Preceded by: Paul Pisasale
- Succeeded by: Council dismissed

Councillor for Division 7, Ipswich City Council
- In office 2000–2017
- Preceded by: Gerard Pender
- Succeeded by: David Martin

Councillor for Division 3, Ipswich City Council
- Incumbent
- Assumed office 11 April 2024
- Preceded by: Andrew Fechner

Personal details
- Born: January 13, 1971 (age 55) Ipswich, Queensland, Australia
- Party: Independent (2018-present); Independent Labor (2000–2018)
- Children: 5
- Profession: Police officer

Andrew Antoniolli (Full name: Andrew Francis Antoniolli) is an Australian local government politician from Ipswich, Queensland. A former Queensland Police officer, Antoniolli began his political career in 2000 when he succeeded Gerard Pender as the Division 7 councillor for Ipswich City Council. He held that position until 2017 when he was elected Mayor of Ipswich following the resignation of Paul Pisasale.

Antoniolli campaigned for mayor on a platform of "accountability and transparency", but in May 2018 he was charged with multiple counts of fraud by the Queensland Crime and Corruption Commission (CCC) over his use of council funds to purchase charity auction items. He was found guilty in 2019 and received a suspended jail sentence, but was acquitted after successfully appealing the conviction in 2020.

== Early life and police career ==
Antoniolli was born in Ipswich, Queensland and attended Ipswich North State School and Ipswich State High School, where he served as a school prefect in 1988.

Before entering politics he served for over a decade in the Ipswich district of the Queensland Police Service, where he became officer in charge of the Redbank police beat. His roles included crime prevention, community policing, and intelligence work. Antoniolli also organised community events, including eight years of the Ipswich Police Community Cup Touch Carnival, which raised funds for local charities. He also worked for a time as a real-estate salesperson in Ipswich.

== Ipswich city councillor (2000–2017) ==
Antoniolli was first elected to Ipswich City Council in 2000 at the age of 39, becoming the youngest councillor elected in over two decades and among the youngest in the city's history. He contested the Division 7 seat vacated by then-councillor Gerard Pender, who had resigned to make an unsuccessful bid for mayor. Antoniolli went on to serve the Division 7 community for 17 years, including a period as deputy mayor. During his time on council, Antoniolli was actively involved in community engagement, urban development planning, and policing initiatives, drawing on his prior experience as a Queensland Police officer.

In 2014 Antoniolli was appointed as a director of Ipswich City Properties Pty Ltd (ICP), a council-owned company responsible for overseeing major urban redevelopment including the Ipswich City Square and broader central business district (CBD) renewal projects. He joined a five-person board consisting of Mayor Paul Pisasale, Councillor Paul Tully, Council CEO Jim Lindsay, and Council Solicitor Daniel Best, with Pisasale saying, "Andrew is very well connected in the CBD. He has an office in the CBD and talks to the retailers in the CBD all the time ... to have that experience and knowledge on Ipswich City Properties is invaluable." Antoniolli stated that he was "looking forward to helping steer the development of the city heart in the right direction" and advocated for a connected and well-planned mall precinct. "Ipswich City Properties set the direction of the CBD," he said, "and I believe that someone like me who is embedded in the CBD can get advice through to the board about what is needed." He strongly supported the 2007 master plan that identified the redevelopment of the Ipswich Mall as a "catalyst project."

ICP later faced public and media scrutiny regarding its financial management and progress, with questions raised about governance and transparency. A 2018 ABC News investigation revealed ICP had made losses of A$78 million, delivering little progress despite over a decade of planning. Critics claimed ratepayers had been "short-changed" due to perceived lack of oversight, and some commentators alleged that councillors, including Antoniolli, should have exercised stronger financial controls. A 2018 Courier-Mail report confirmed that the project had stalled for years despite previous council claims that progress was imminent. Although construction on Ipswich Central eventually resumed in mid-2018, some critics argued that ICP had not met its objectives and raised concerns about the use of public resources.

In August 2016 Antoniolli was involved in a widely publicised incident at Fire Station 101, Ipswich's council-run innovation hub. According to media reports a verbal altercation with then-Mayor Paul Pisasale allegedly escalated into a physical confrontation, with some witnesses alleging that Antoniolli threw a punch. Antoniolli denied the allegation, describing it as a "robust discussion" with no physical contact. No formal complaints or charges were made.

== Ipswich city mayor (2017–2018) ==
Ipswich's long-serving mayor Paul Pisasale resigned suddenly in June 2017, citing ill health shortly after the Queensland Crime and Corruption Commission executed a search warrant on his office. The resignation triggered a mayoral by-election and Antoniolli announced his candidacy shortly thereafter. In the wake of growing scrutiny over council conduct Antoniolli positioned himself as a reform candidate, pledging to introduce reforms aimed at greater transparency and improve public trust. He campaigned on a platform of open governance, promising to "lift the veil of secrecy," introduce a new councillor code of conduct, and make registers of interest public. During the campaign, Antoniolli responded to speculation surrounding ongoing CCC investigations, stating publicly that he was not under investigation and had not been contacted by authorities. He reaffirmed his commitment to cooperate with any inquiries and to maintain transparency.

Antoniolli was elected as the 50th mayor of Ipswich in the by-election on 19 August 2017, defeating acting mayor Paul Tully by 39,321 votes (54.44%) to 32,902 votes (45.56%) after preferences. The ensuing by-election for his now-vacant Division 7 seat was won by David Martin.

During his mayoral campaign Antoniolli received significant financial support from the waste management sector, raising concerns about potential conflicts of interest given Ipswich's ongoing waste disposal issues. Notably, Plencove Pty Ltd donated $15,600 to Antoniolli's campaign, representing approximately one-third of the $43,000 in donations declared by Antoniolli at that time. Plencove and its sister company NuGrow were run by Roy Wilson and operated a waste transfer station in Swanbank, an area central to debates over interstate waste dumping in Ipswich. The sizeable donation prompted scrutiny from local community groups, with Jim Dodrill, president of the Ipswich Ratepayers Association saying in a media interview, "There is that potential conflict...", referring to the campaign donations declared by Antoniolli.

In a 2024 council committee meeting Antoniolli faced criticism for initially hesitating to disclose the exact amount received from NuGrow. After repeated questioning he admitted to the $15,000 donation, later reflecting, "I should've just said 15 grand to begin with."

== Fraud charges and resignation (2018–2020) ==
On 2 May 2018 Antoniolli was charged with seven counts of fraud by the CCC, who alleged that between 2011 and 2017 he used council funds to purchase items at charity auctions for personal use, with values ranging from $100 to over $2,000. In response, Antoniolli stood down as mayor but maintained his innocence, stating, "Let me be clear – I have never been involved in corrupt or criminal activity and I intend to fight these charges." The Queensland Government subsequently announced plans to dismiss the Ipswich City Council, citing concerns about overall governance and public confidence.

On 30 May 2018 Antoniolli was arrested for allegedly breaching his bail conditions by communicating with council employees, but his lawyer argued that the contact occurred while returning council property and did not involve witnesses in the prosecution. The court granted bail with additional conditions, including non-contact orders and restrictions on entering council premises. Concerns were also raised about Antoniolli's mental health, with his lawyer noting that he had engaged with health professionals and was supported by his family. In September 2018 prosecutors dropped the original seven charges and filed 14 new charges related to similar conduct, leading to delays in the trial.

Antoniolli's trial commenced in May 2019, where he pleaded not guilty to 13 fraud-related charges, asserting that the purchases were made in good faith and under the advice of council executives. During the trial he testified that former mayor Paul Pisasale and two former CEOs had informed him that such purchases were permissible. But on 5 June 2019 Antoniolli was found guilty on all counts. Magistrate Anthony Gett described his testimony as "largely self-serving and significantly contrived," adding that his conduct and demeanour in court "gave the impression his evidence appeared to be rehearsed and lacked a ring of truth." The magistrate concluded that Antoniolli acted dishonestly and misappropriated council money. On 8 August 2019 he was sentenced to six months imprisonment, wholly suspended, and a conviction was recorded. His defence barrister stated that Antoniolli had "paid and will continue to pay for this offending for the rest of his life." Antoniolli immediately filed an appeal against the convictions.

On 11 December 2020 the District Court quashed all of Antoniolli's convictions. Judge Dennis Lynch QC found that the magistrate erred by not considering that Antoniolli acted under the guidance of council CEOs and did not intend to act dishonestly. The judge noted, "At no time did [Mr Antoniolli] acknowledge that at the time he bid at charity auctions or supported payments from the [Community Donation Fund] he believed he was doing anything wrong."

In November 2021 the Queensland Court of Appeal refused the Police Commissioner's application for leave to appeal the district court's decision. In a majority decision, Chief Justice Catherine Holmes and Justices John Bond and Peter Flanagan found that the commissioner failed to establish a reasonable argument that the district court judge's findings should be overturned. Justice Bond stated, "Unless the [Police Commissioner] could overturn that finding, dishonesty could never be established, and any appeal was bound to fail." Chief Justice Holmes dissented, indicating she would have granted leave to appeal but ultimately would have dismissed the appeal.

In February 2022 the Court of Appeal ordered the Police Commissioner to pay Antoniolli's legal costs on a standard basis, rejecting his application for indemnity costs. Chief Justice Holmes noted that while the administration of justice in cases involving alleged misappropriation of public funds is of public importance, there was no material submitted to warrant an indemnity costs order. As a result Antoniolli was entitled to recover approximately 60–75% of his legal expenses.

== Return to office (2024–present) ==
After several years away from politics, Antoniolli ran for Division 3 in the 2024 Ipswich City Council elections and was elected on 16 March 2024.

=== Disaster management role ===
At the new council's post-election meeting Ipswich Mayor Teresa Harding was removed as chair of the Ipswich Local Disaster Management Group (LDMG), and in a departure from usual practice Councillor Antoniolli was appointed chairperson instead. This role oversees local emergency coordination and is traditionally held by the sitting mayor in Queensland councils. The decision drew criticism from Harding and some residents who viewed it as undermining the mayor's authority, with Harding later noting that the move "deviates from the historical norm" and voicing concern that it was done without clear justification. Antoniolli defended his appointment, arguing that both his experience and the council's vote legitimised the outcome.

In March 2025 Harding complained she had been left "unaware" of a key emergency briefing with regard to ex-Tropical Cyclone Alfred and raised concerns with state authorities about the LDMG's information-sharing under Antoniolli's leadership Antoniolli denied any mishandling and defended his actions as LDMG chair, stating that the mayor had an open invitation to LDMG meetings and that he had not intended to exclude her. Local media described the episode as a "bicker" between the mayor and the disaster group chair over communication during the cyclone response. Antoniolli maintained that he kept the public and officials adequately informed, while Harding argued the situation exemplified the problems with removing the mayor from the disaster management helm.

In October 2025 the Queensland Government announced that it would amend state disaster management arrangements so that Queensland mayors or their nominees would automatically chair local disaster management groups. The change was described as arising from the Ipswich dispute over the LDMG chairmanship, with Antoniolli expected to lose the role once the reforms took effect. Antoniolli criticised the reform, saying councillors had not been consulted, while Harding welcomed the changes and argued that the Ipswich case had exposed a loophole in Queensland's disaster management framework. Disaster Management Amendment Regulation 2025 took effect on 1 December 2025, amending section 10 of the Disaster Management Regulation 2014 to provide that, except in combined local government arrangements, the chairperson of a local disaster management group was to be the mayor of the relevant local government, or a councillor nominated by the mayor. As a result, Antoniolli ceased to be chair of the Ipswich LDMG and Harding was reinstated to the role.

=== By-election debate ===
In August 2024 Division 4 Councillor David Cullen resigned five months into the role. While his departure was initially attributed to ill health, Cullen later revealed he stepped down due to what he saw as systemic dysfunction, financial mismanagement, and internal power struggles within Ipswich City Council. He described a toxic culture where "egos, not evidence" guided decisions, and concerns about missing funds and failed projects were ignored.

Because Cullen's resignation occurred within 12 months of the general election, under Queensland law the council had the option of avoiding a costly by-election by simply appointing Russell Milligan, the runner-up from the 2024 local election, to the vacancy. However, at a meeting on 5 September 2024 the councillors voted 5–3, including Antoniolli, to reject the appointment and instead hold a by-election to let voters choose a new councillor.

Mayor Teresa Harding strongly opposed this move, saying a by-election was unnecessary and that at an estimated cost of between $320,000 and $550,000 it would be an "irresponsible waste of ratepayer money" during a budget-sensitive time. Antoniolli and his supporters countered that democracy was paramount, arguing that Ipswich residents "deserved to have a vote" on their new representative rather than an appointment being made, saying "the public has the right to choose – that of course is the very point of democracy". Antoniolli also noted the "irony of [the council] voting on whether the public gets a vote" and maintained that a by-election was the fairest outcome. The vote triggered debate in the local media about balancing democratic principles against fiscal responsibility, but in the end the council's majority decision stood and preparations for a by-election went ahead.

=== Media "gag" dispute ===
In January 2025 Councillor Paul Tully introduced a surprise motion seeking to amend Ipswich City Council's media policy in a way that would elevate committee chairpersons (i.e. councillors in charge of specific portfolios) as the primary spokespeople on matters within their portfolios. Under the existing arrangements the mayor traditionally served as the default spokesperson for major council issues, a common practice across Queensland councils. But by formalising that portfolio chairs speak for the council on relevant issues, Tully's proposed change would limit the mayor's public comment role on those topics.

Antoniolli expressed support for the proposal, arguing that the current media policy was "unfair" to the councillors who serve as committee chairs and do the groundwork on issues. He suggested that allowing those councillors to speak would better inform the public about specific initiatives rather than all messages coming through the mayor's office. His stance was in line with Tully describing his motion as a minor policy fix to properly recognise portfolio spokespeople and denying it was intended to muzzle the mayor. The issue came to a head at a council meeting on 30 January 2025. Amid significant media attention and with some outlets calling the plan an unprecedented attempt at a "media gag", the council deliberated on the motion. In a dramatic turn, Tully opted at the last minute to "park" (defer) the motion, saying that "some councillors" wanted more time to consider the implications. Antoniolli, Tully, and their colleagues voted to postpone the debate indefinitely.

=== Food trucks controversy ===
In late 2024 Antoniolli publicly criticised the council's decision to allow food trucks to operate during a school holiday event in the Nicholas Street Precinct, arguing it undermined local restaurants. In comments published in the Ipswich Tribune, Antoniolli described the decision as "a slap in the face" to traders and accused council of "over-promising and under-delivering" in the CBD. His remarks triggered internal backlash, with CEO Sonia Cooper stating that multiple council officers felt "gutted and devastated" by what they perceived as derogatory attacks on their integrity. The matter was referred to the Office of the Independent Assessor (OIA) for formal investigation, with a second allegation added after Antoniolli replied to the CEO's concerns by saying: "If only your concerns were for the mum and dad businesses that are suffering".

In March 2025 the OIA's report substantiated both allegations against Antoniolli, finding that his media comments had "diminished the council's standing" and that his email to the CEO was disrespectful. The investigator recommended formal findings of inappropriate conduct and possible disciplinary measures. However, when the matter was brought before Ipswich City Council for a vote on 30 April 2025 the majority of councillors voted against upholding the findings, effectively clearing Antoniolli of any sanction. Mayor Teresa Harding expressed disappointment, calling the decision "embarrassing" and criticising the waste of $18,000 in ratepayer funds spent on the investigation.

== Personal life ==
Antoniolli has been married, although the marriage broke down and he was separated during his court battles. He has five daughters and at least one grandchild.
