= Jim Madden =

Australian politician

Councillor Jim Madden
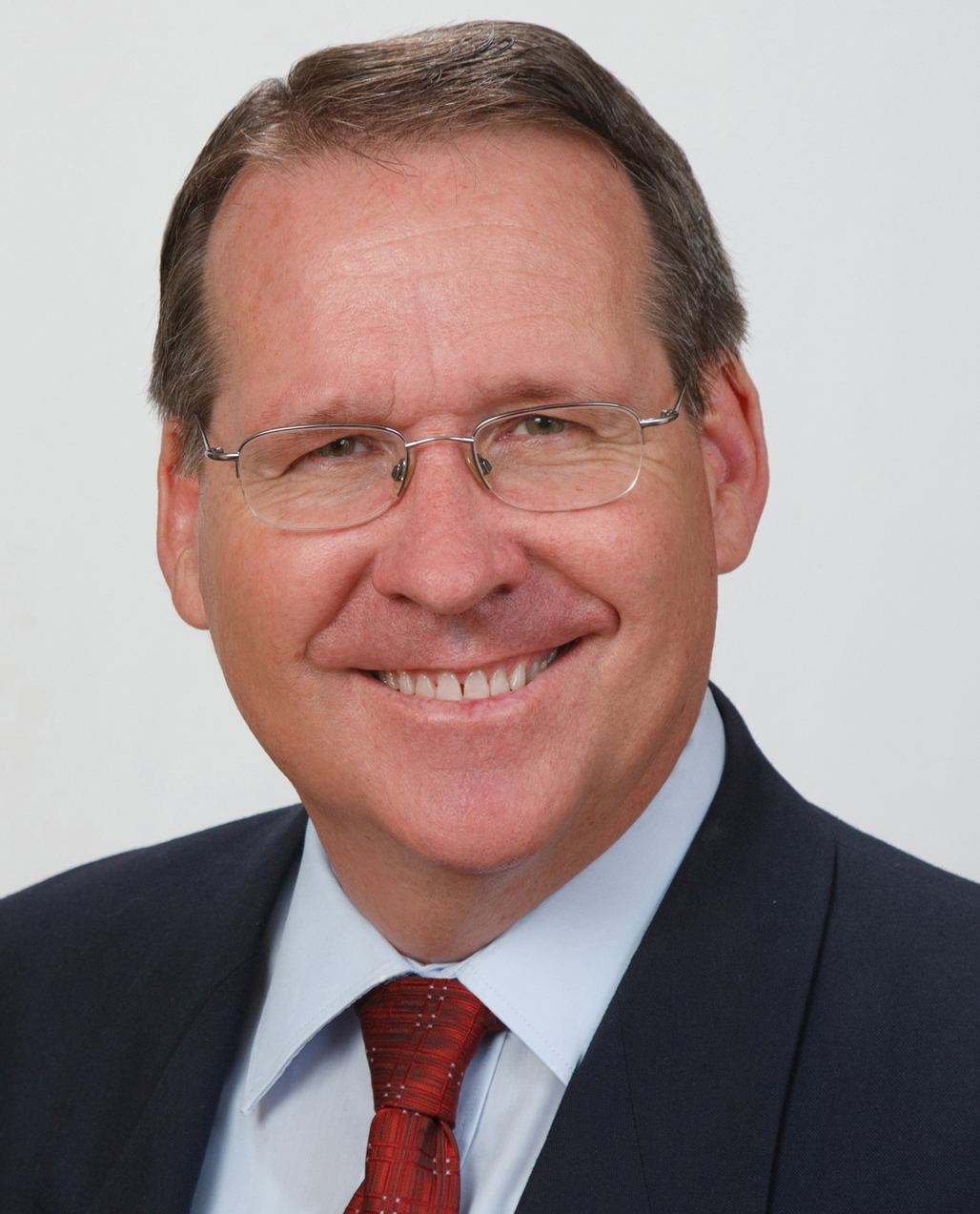
- Madden in 2014

Councillor of the City of Ipswich for Division 4
- Incumbent
- Assumed office 16 March 2024 Serving with David Cullen
- Mayor: Teresa Harding
- Preceded by: Kate Kunzelmann

Member of the Queensland Legislative Assembly for Ipswich West
- In office 31 January 2015 – 26 January 2024
- Preceded by: Sean Choat
- Succeeded by: Darren Zanow

Member of the Somerset Regional Council
- In office 28 April 2012 – 31 January 2015
- Succeeded by: Bob Whalley

Personal details
- Born: 12 April 1958 (age 68) Ipswich, Queensland, Australia
- Party: Labor
- Education: University of Queensland; Queensland University of Technology
- Occupation: Agronomist
- Profession: Lawyer

James Edward Madden (born 12 April 1958) is an Australian politician. He was the Labor member for Ipswich West in the Queensland Legislative Assembly from 2015 to 2024.

== Early life and education ==
Madden was born and raised in Ipswich. He is a fifth generation Ipswich West resident since his family came to Australia from Ireland in 1863. He attended St Mary's Primary School and went on to graduate from St Edmund's College. He studied horticulture and agriculture at UQ Gatton before working as an agronomist. He later studied law at QUT. In his maiden speech Madden stated that perhaps his proudest achievement was, along with his late mother, successfully reviving the tradition of the discontinued Anzac Day service at Woodend in 1999, which now attracts a crowd of 1,000 people.

== Career ==
Before the 2015 election, Madden was a lawyer and councillor for Somerset Regional Council from 2012 to 2015.

=== Queensland state election results ===
Jim Madden was the Labor candidate for Ipswich West in the 2015 Queensland state election. He ran against sitting Liberal National member Sean Choat. Madden won the district with 57.72 percent of the two-party-preferred vote and a positive swing of 14.87 percent.

Madden was re-elected after the 2017 Queensland state election with 58.7 percent of the two-candidate-preferred vote.

At the 2020 Queensland state election, Madden was re-elected with 50.1 percent of the first preference vote and 64.3 percent of the two-candidate-preferred vote.

=== Member for Ipswich West ===
In October 2015, Liberal National member Ian Rickuss called some Labor MPs, including Madden, "drag queens". Madden responded that Rickuss was "out of touch" and that "jokes made at the expense of the LGBTI community are unacceptable now."

In December 2015, Madden stepped down from Parliament's ethics committee after taking responsibility for a suspected leak. Ethics committee members were prohibited from revealing information about their deliberations. He thought his comments to a Queensland Times journalist were "innocuous" but admitted he "should not have spoken to him at all." He said this mistake was due to his inexperience as a "relatively new member of Parliament and the ethics committee." He received no further punishment for his role in the leak.

In February 2016, Madden supported the proposed lockout laws since be believed they were proven effective elsewhere and would address alcohol-fuelled violence.

In March 2017, Madden supported the Criminal Law Amendment Bill which removed "unwanted sexual advancements" as a partial defence for defendants accused of murder. He described the previous law as a "gay panic defence" which was "archaic". He said the message of the legislation was that discrimination was "not acceptable and that we value the LBGTI community".

In October 2018, he voted in favour of a bill which made abortion available, on request, up to 22 weeks' gestation and introduced "safe access zones" of 150 metres around clinics. Madden supported an amendment lowering the gestation limit from 22 to 16 weeks.

On 18 April 2023, he announced his intention to retire from politics at the 2024 election. He resigned early on 27 January 2024 to stand for election to the Ipswich City Council.

== Personal life ==
Madden is a practicing Catholic.

== See also ==
- Electoral results for the district of Ipswich West

Parliament of Queensland
Preceded by Sean Choat	Member for Ipswich West; 2015–2024	Succeeded by Darren Zanow
