= Sean Choat =

Australian Liberal National politician

Member of the Somerset Regional Council
- In office 19 March 2016 – 16 March 2024
- Preceded by: Jim Madden

Member of the Queensland Legislative Assembly for Ipswich West
- In office 24 March 2012 – 31 January 2015
- Preceded by: Wayne Wendt
- Succeeded by: Jim Madden

Personal details
- Born: 20 February 1970 (age 56) Ryde, New South Wales
- Party: Liberal National Party of Queensland

Sean Kenneth Choat (born 2 February 1970) is an Australian Liberal National politician who was the member of the Legislative Assembly of Queensland for Ipswich West from 2012 to 2015.

Choat contested the 2006 and 2009 state elections for the Liberal Party of Australia (QLD) and the LNP respectively, previous to his election in 2012.

Choat announced he would cross the floor and go against his party on the issue of asset sales.

He was elected as a councillor on the Somerset Regional Council in 2016 and re-elected in 2020.

Parliament of Queensland
Preceded by Wayne Wendt	Member for Ipswich West; 2012–2015	Succeeded by Jim Madden
