= Albert Hales =

Australian politician (born 1932)

Member of the Queensland Legislative Assembly for Ipswich West
- In office 7 December 1974 – 12 November 1977
- Preceded by: Vi Jordan
- Succeeded by: David Underwood

Personal details
- Born: Albert Hales; 9 November 1932 (age 93) Ipswich, Queensland, Australia
- Party: Country Party/National Party
- Spouse: Elaine Merle Webb (m.1955)
- Occupation: Real estate agent, Property developer, Newsagent, Electrician

Albert Hales (born 9 November 1932) is an Australian politician. He was a National Party member of the Legislative Assembly of Queensland from 1974 until 1977, representing the electorate of Ipswich West.

Hales was born in Ipswich, and was educated at the Bundamba and Ipswich Central state schools and Ipswich Grammar School. He initially trained as an electrician, working in that trade from 1948 until 1963, became a newsagent from 1963 to 1966, and was a real estate agent and property developer thereafter. He also served as president of the Ipswich branch of the Real Estate Institute of Queensland and as treasurer of the Central Methodist Mission in Ipswich.

Hales was elected as the National Party member for the usually safe Labor seat of Ipswich West amidst the National-Liberal landslide at the 1974 election. He was defeated at the 1977 election.

He married Elaine Merle Webb on 2 April 1955, and has three children.

Parliament of Queensland
Preceded by Vi Jordan	Member for Ipswich West; 1974–1977	Succeeded by David Underwood
