= Cameron Thompson (politician) =

Australian politician (born 1960)

Member of the Australian Parliament for Blair
- In office 3 October 1998 – 24 November 2007
- Preceded by: New seat
- Succeeded by: Shayne Neumann

Personal details
- Born: 1 October 1960 (age 66) Rockhampton, Queensland
- Party: Liberal Party of Australia
- Spouse: Sharen Thompson
- Children: Fletcher, Ari, Sullivan
- Occupation: Journalist

Cameron Paul Thompson (born 1 October 1960) is an Australian former politician who served as a member of the House of Representatives representing the Division of Blair in Queensland. A member of the Liberal Party, he served from 1998 until 2007.

== Early life ==
Thompson was born in Rockhampton, Queensland, and was a radio journalist, as well as press secretary and chief of staff to several state and territory politicians in Queensland and the Northern Territory before entering politics.

== Election to parliament ==
Thompson was preselected for the new division of Blair for the 1998 election. Considerable press at the time focussed on the contest, as the redistribution creating the seat had split One Nation leader Pauline Hanson's seat of Oxley in half. A Labor-friendly section around Brisbane remained in Oxley, while a more rural section became Blair. Hanson opted to contest Blair, which contained most of her former base.

After election day, the contest was noted for being one of only ten occasions where a candidate who did not finish first or second went on to win under Australia's instant-runoff voting system. Thompson finished third on the first count, behind Hanson and Labor's Virginia Clarke. However, the major parties all recommended that their voters preference each other ahead of Hanson, allowing Thompson to pull ahead of Clarke on Nationals voters' preferences. On the eighth count, Thompson picked up three quarters of Clarke's voters' preferences, enough for him to win the two-party-preferred vote against Hanson.

Thompson's ousting of Hanson from Federal Parliament was to be his only claim to political fame.

== The Goodna Bypass ==
Thompson led a proposal to construct a bypass east of the city of Ipswich, known as the Goodna Bypass and connecting Dinmore to the Logan Motorway, in preference to a six-lane upgrade of the Ipswich Motorway.

In pursuit of the bypass, he encountered opposition from leaders within his own party including Queensland's state Liberal leader Dr Bruce Flegg and Brisbane Lord Mayor Campbell Newman. After a set of feasibility studies and options reports, the federal government announced funding for the A$2.3 billion Goodna Bypass. By July, the cost had increased to $2.8 billion.

As the 2007 election approached, Thompson campaigned almost solely on the Goodna Bypass, which Labor had said they would not build if they won government. However, a redistribution pushed Blair further into Ipswich. The new territory was significantly pro-Labor and cut Thompson's majority in half, from a relatively safe 11.2 percent to a marginal 5.7 percent—putting it just outside the range of seats Labor would need to take off the Coalition in order to win government. Together with a strong swing in Queensland towards the Labor Party, this resulted in Thompson's defeat by Labor candidate Shayne Neumann, with a two party preferred swing of 10.17%—significantly over the Queensland average swing of 7.53%.

== Post-parliamentary life ==
Thompson became a senior adviser to state National leader Lawrence Springborg and temporarily vacated that position to contest the state Liberal presidency against his federal parliamentary colleague Mal Brough and sitting Liberal Party president Gary Spence on a platform of merging the Liberal and National parties. In 2010, he was unsuccessful in getting the endorsement of the newly merged Liberal National Party of Queensland to be the party's candidate for the Division of Wright.

Parliament of Australia
New division	Member for Blair; 1998–2007	Succeeded by Shayne Neumann
