= David Underwood =

Australian politician

Member of the Queensland Legislative Assembly for Ipswich West
- In office 12 November 1977 – 2 December 1989
- Preceded by: Albert Hales
- Succeeded by: Don Livingstone

Personal details
- Born: David Francis Underwood; 12 June 1951 (age 75) Pittsworth, Queensland, Australia
- Party: Labor
- Spouse: J Jones
- Education: Darling Downs Institute of Advanced Education
- Occupation: Schoolteacher

David Francis Underwood (born 12 June 1951) is a former Australian politician.

He was born in Pittsworth, the son of Frank Underwood. He attended state and Catholic schools in the Darling Downs region before becoming a forestry labourer, shed hand, bank clerk and ultimately schoolteacher. In 1977 he was elected to the Queensland Legislative Assembly as the Labor member for Ipswich West. In 1981 he was appointed Opposition Health Spokesman, moving to Tourism, National Parks, Sport and the Arts in 1983, to Education and the Arts in 1986, and to Transport in 1987. He stepped down from the front bench in 1988 and retired from politics in 1989. From 1991 to 1995 he was mayor of Ipswich City Council.

Parliament of Queensland
Preceded by Albert Hales	Member for Ipswich West; 1977–1989	Succeeded by Don Livingstone
