= Shayne Neumann =

Australian politician (born 1961)

The Honourable Shayne Neumann MP
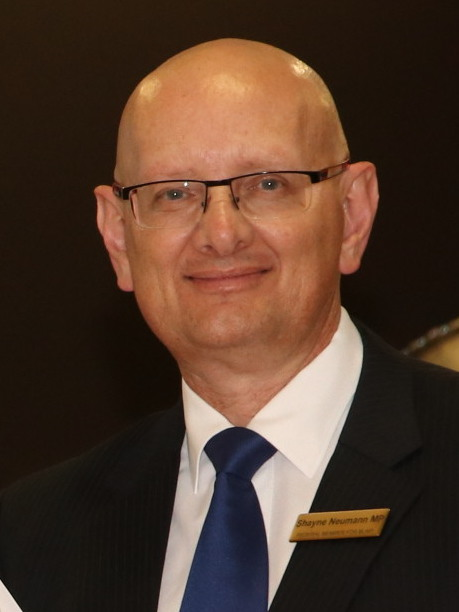
- Shayne Neumann in 2018

Member of the Australian Parliament for Blair
- Incumbent
- Assumed office 24 November 2007
- Preceded by: Cameron Thompson

Personal details
- Born: 26 August 1961 (age 65) Ipswich, Queensland, Australia
- Party: Australian Labor Party
- Children: Jacqueline Neumann
- Education: University of Queensland
- Profession: Lawyer
- Website: www.shayneneumann.com.au

Shayne Kenneth Neumann (born 26 August 1961) is an Australian politician. He is a member of the Australian Labor Party and has been a member of the House of Representatives since 2007, representing the Division of Blair. In March 2013, he was appointed Parliamentary Secretary to the Attorney-General and Parliamentary Secretary for Health and Ageing. After the 2013 federal election, he was appointed Shadow Minister for Indigenous Affairs and for Ageing. In 2016, he was appointed Shadow Minister for Immigration and Border Protection. After the 2019 federal election, he was appointed Shadow Minister for Veterans' Affairs and Defence Personnel.

== Early life ==
Neumann was born in Ipswich, Queensland. Neither of his parents completed high school; his father was a meatworker and his mother was a shop assistant. In his maiden speech, he stated: "In my childhood, I was exposed to the twin evils of addiction to alcohol and gambling. I lived through the poverty caused thereby and the pain of the divorce which followed."

Neumann attended Ipswich East State Primary School and Bundamba State Secondary College. His first job was as a cleaner at a meatworks in Dinmore. He completed a Bachelors of Arts majoring in government and economics, and a Bachelor of Laws from the University of Queensland. Shayne was a partner in the Brisbane-based law firm of Neumann and Turnour Lawyers, which he established at the age of 26 in partnership with Matthew Turnour (brother of former Federal MP Jim Turnour). He specialised in family law.

== Political career ==
Neumann has cited the rise of Pauline Hanson in his home town of Ipswich as his motivation for becoming more involved in politics.

Neumann was the Labor candidate for Blair at the 2004 federal election, and was heavily defeated by sitting Liberal member Cameron Thompson who received 61.21 percent of the two-party-preferred vote. Blair was considered a Liberal safe seat at the time.

Neumann sought a rematch in 2007. This time, he was aided by two factors. Firstly, a redistribution of the electoral boundaries, finalised in 2006, pushed Blair further into Ipswich while cutting out the conservative-leaning rural towns of Esk and Kingaroy, roughly halving Thompson's majority and putting Blair just outside the range of seats that Labor would have needed to win government. Secondly, there was a big Labor resurgence across the country at the 2007 federal election under the leadership of Kevin Rudd. This resurgence was at its greatest in Rudd's home state of Queensland. Neumann won the seat on a swing of 10.17 points.

Neumann was re-elected in 2010 with only a modest swing against him. He was re-elected in 2013, actually picking up a small swing in his favour as Labor lost government. In 2016, Neumann technically made Blair a safe Labor seat by taking 58.88 percent of the two-party vote.

Neumann supported Rudd in the Australian Labor Party leadership spill on 26 June 2013. He stated that "it was a really tough decision because I thought it was in the best interests of our state and of the people in my electorate." In Labor's October 2013 leadership spill, Neumann supported Bill Shorten.

Following the ALP's defeat at the 2013 federal election, Neumann served as a shadow minister under opposition leaders Bill Shorten and Anthony Albanese, including as a member of Shorten's shadow cabinet from 2013 to 2019. He held the shadow portfolios of Indigenous affairs (2013–2016), ageing (2013–2016), Northern Australia (2016), immigration and border protection (2016–2019), and veterans' affairs and defence personnel (2019–2022). However, he was not included in the Albanese ministry after the ALP won the 2022 election.

=== Political positions ===
Neumann is a Christian. He has been described as part of the Labor Right, and as such he was opposed to same sex marriage until late 2015. Neumann had publicly stated his opposition to same sex marriage in August 2011, August 2013, and June 2015. In December 2015, Neumann confirmed his newfound support of same sex marriage. In August 2016, Neumann said he was against the proposed plebiscite on same sex marriage.

Neumann has been against pushes to repeal Section 18C of the Racial Discrimination Act. He said the laws protect free speech, but also protect against racial hatred.

== Electoral history ==
House of Representatives
| Year | Electorate | Party | First preference result | | | | Two candidate result | | | |
| Year | Electorate | Party | Votes | % | ±% | Position | Votes | % | ±% | Result |
|---|---|---|---|---|---|---|---|---|---|---|
| 2007 | Blair | Labor | 40,663 | 48.83 | ▲11.99 | First | 45,369 | 54.48 | ▼10.17 | Elected |
| 2010 | Blair | Labor | 30,890 | 42.08 | ▼9.23 | First | 39,814 | 54.24 | ▼2.74 | Elected |
| 2013 | Blair | Labor | 32,818 | 41.55 | ▼0.53 | First | 43,642 | 55.26 | ▲1.02 | Elected |
| 2016 | Blair | Labor | 35,691 | 41.90 | ▲0.35 | First | 50,158 | 58.88 | ▲3.62 | Elected |
| 2019 | Blair | Labor | 29.987 | 31.26 | ▼9.79 | First | 49,123 | 51.21 | ▼6.93 | Elected |
| 2022 | Blair | Labor | 26,494 | 35.01 | ▲3.75 | First | 57,575 | 55.23 | ▲4.02 | Elected |

Parliament of Australia
| Preceded by Cameron Thompson | Member for Blair; 2007–present | Incumbent |
