= Wayne Wendt =

Australian politician

Mayor of the City of Ipswich (Acting)
- In office 3 May 2018 – 21 August 2018
- Preceded by: Andrew Antoniolli
- Succeeded by: Council Dissolved

Ipswich City Councillor for Division 5
- In office 13 March 2016 – 21 August 2018
- Preceded by: Heather Morrow
- Succeeded by: Council Dissolved

Member of the Queensland Legislative Assembly for Ipswich West
- In office 9 September 2006 – 23 March 2012
- Preceded by: Don Livingstone
- Succeeded by: Sean Choat

Personal details
- Born: Wayne Earl Wendt; 21 August 1960 (age 66)
- Party: Labor
- Education: Griffith University

Wayne Earl Wendt (born 21 August 1960) is a Labor Party politician who represented the electoral district of Ipswich West in the Legislative Assembly of Queensland.

In 2016, Wendt was elected as the Division 5 Councillor of the City of Ipswich. In 2017 he was elected Deputy Mayor. On May 3, 2018, he became Acting Mayor, following the resignation by the Mayor on suspected corruption charges and served in this capacity until the dissolution of Ipswich City Council in August 2018.

Parliament of Queensland
Preceded by Don Livingstone	Member for Ipswich West; 2006–2012	Succeeded by Sean Choat
