= Teresa Harding =

Australian politician (born 1968/1969)

Councillor Teresa Harding

51st Mayor of Ipswich
- Incumbent
- Assumed office 28 March 2020
- Deputy: Jacob Madsen (2020–2024); Nicole Jonic (2024–present)
- Preceded by: Andrew Antoniolli

Personal details
- Born: 1969 (age 56–57) Murwillumbah, New South Wales, Australia
- Party: Independent
- Other political affiliations: Liberal National
- Spouse: Steven Harding
- Children: 3
- Occupation: Politician, project manager
- Profession: Military officer, public servant

Military service
- Allegiance: Australia
- Branch/service: Royal Australian Air Force
- Years of service: 2003–2010
- Rank: Project Director (civilian equivalent)

Teresa Jane Harding (born 1968/1969) is an Australian local government politician who has served as the Mayor of the City of Ipswich since 28 March 2020. She is the 51st mayor of Ipswich and the first woman to hold the office in the city’s history.

Harding was elected mayor as an independent candidate after running on a platform of restoring integrity to the council following a major corruption scandal in which the entirety of the Paul Pisasale / Andrew Antoniolli led Ipswich City Council were dismissed. A former federal political candidate for the Liberal National Party, she is the first non-Labor-aligned politician to lead Ipswich in over five decades. She won re-election for a second term in 2024.

== Early life and education ==
Harding was born in Murwillumbah, New South Wales, and later moved to South East Queensland. She attended university in Australia and earned multiple tertiary qualifications, including a Master of Management degree, a post-graduate diploma in management, and a post-graduate certificate in information technology. She also completed the Australian Institute of Company Directors course as part of her professional development.

Harding worked in the information technology sector in her early career. For about ten years she was a regional sales representative in the IT industry, a role which involved managing client relationships and business development. In the mid-2000s she began working with the Australian Department of Defence.

== Political career ==
=== Federal election campaigns ===
Harding stood as the LNP candidate for the federal Division of Blair, based around Ipswich, in the 2013 Australian federal election. At that time she was described as a 44-year-old IT professional and former RAAF project director living in the Ipswich area. Harding campaigned as a local mother (“mum on a mission”) aiming to unseat the Labor incumbent, Shayne Neumann.

In the 2013 contest, she finished second with 33.9% of the primary vote and was defeated after preferences, receiving about 44.7% of the two-candidate-preferred vote to Neumann’s 55.3%. Harding again contested the Blair seat for the LNP at the 2016 federal election, facing Neumann for a second time. She obtained 28.7% of first-preference votes, and ultimately lost with a two-party result of 41.1% against Neumann’s 58.9%.

=== Candidacy for Mayor of Ipswich ===
In mid-2018, the Queensland Government dismissed the entire Ipswich City Council due to a wide-ranging corruption investigation by the Crime and Corruption Commission (CCC). The CCC’s probes had led to 15 people – including two former Ipswich mayors (Paul Pisasale and Andrew Antoniolli) – being charged with offences ranging from fraud to extortion. An interim administrator was appointed to run the council until new elections could be held in March 2020.

Harding announced her candidacy for Mayor of Ipswich in the 2020 local government elections. She released a 100-day action plan of reforms she promised to implement if elected, centring on open governance, community consultation, and overhauling council finances.

=== Second term (2024–present) ===
Harding described Ipswich as an “Olympic City” and encouraged residents to embrace growth and prepare for the opportunities presented by the 2032 Brisbane Olympic Games.

=== Achievements and recognition ===
In 2021, Harding was awarded the McKinnon Prize for Emerging Political Leader of the Year, a national honour recognising her leadership in restoring public trust and delivering reform following the dismissal of Ipswich City Council. Harding was recognised for launching Australia’s first Transparency and Integrity Hub, a digital platform that made council financial and operational data publicly accessible in real time.

In 2020, her work in civic transparency was also recognised by the Smart Cities Council Australia New Zealand, with Ipswich City Council receiving a Smart Cities Award for its innovative approach to digital governance.

== Personal life ==
Teresa Harding lives in the Ipswich suburb of Raceview with her family. She is married to Steven Harding, a Royal Australian Air Force veteran who was born and raised in Ipswich. Steven Harding served for 34 years in the RAAF and recently retired from military service. The couple met in the early 2000s during their Defence careers and married in the mid-2000s. They have three children.
