= Electoral district of Ipswich West =

State electoral district of Queensland, Australia

Ipswich West Queensland—Legislative Assembly
- Electoral map of Ipswich West 2017
- State: Queensland
- MP: Wendy Bourne
- Party: Labor
- Namesake: West Ipswich
- Electors: 35,994 (2020)
- Area: 365 km^{2} (140.9 sq mi)
- Demographic: Provincial
- Coordinates: 27°32′S 152°39′E
Electorates around Ipswich West:
Lockyer	Lockyer	Moggill
Lockyer	Ipswich West	Moggill
Scenic Rim	Ipswich	Bundamba

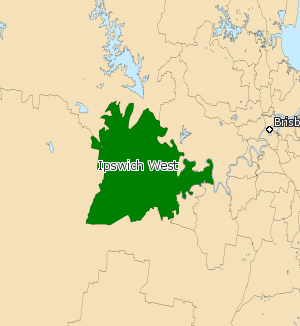
Electoral map of Ipswich West 2008

Ipswich West is an electoral district of the Legislative Assembly in the Australian state of Queensland.

The district takes in western parts of suburban Ipswich, as well as rural areas further west. It was first created for the 1960 election.

== Members for Ipswich West ==
Member	Party	Term
Ivor Marsden	Labor	1960–1966
Vi Jordan	Labor	1966–1974
Albert Hales	National	1974–1977
David Underwood	Labor	1977–1989
Don Livingstone	Labor	1989–1998
Jack Paff	One Nation	1998–1999
Jack Paff	City Country Alliance	1999–2001
Don Livingstone	Labor	2001–2006
Wayne Wendt	Labor	2006–2012
Sean Choat	Liberal National	2012–2015
Jim Madden	Labor	2015–2024
Darren Zanow	Liberal National	2024
Wendy Bourne	Labor	2024–present

== Election results ==
2024 Queensland state election: Ipswich West
Party	Candidate	Votes	%	±%
Labor	Wendy Bourne	12,660	38.63	−11.52
Liberal National	Georgia Toft	10,979	33.50	+12.39
One Nation	Brad Trussell	2,968	9.06	−5.66
Greens	Mark Delaney	2,498	7.62	+1.09
Legalise Cannabis	Harmony Lindsay	1,711	5.22	+0.68
Family First	Beverley Byrnes	1,458	4.45	+4.45
Libertarian	Anthony Bull	497	1.52	+1.52
Total formal votes		32,771	94.89	−1.10
Informal votes		1,763	5.11	+1.10
Turnout		34,534	87.44	+0.68
Two-party-preferred result
Labor	Wendy Bourne	17,672	53.93	−10.42
Liberal National	Georgia Toft	15,099	46.07	+10.42
Labor gain from Liberal National		Swing	−10.42	
