= City of Ipswich =

- Local government area
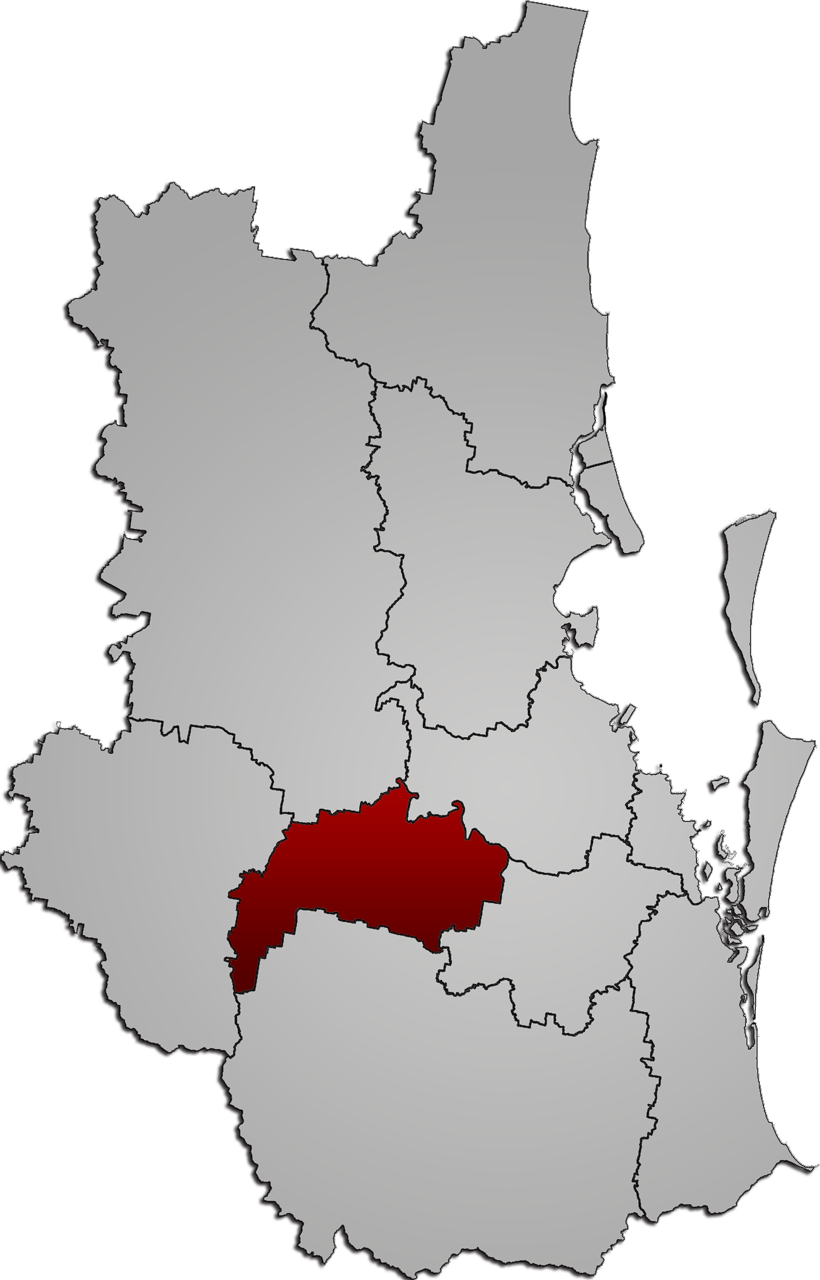
- Location within South East Queensland

- Coat of arms
- Interactive map of City of Ipswich
- Country: Australia
- State: Queensland
- Region: South East Queensland
- Established: 1860
- Council seat: Ipswich

Government
  - Mayor: Teresa Harding
  - State electorates: Ipswich West; Ipswich; Bundamba; Scenic Rim; Jordan
  - Federal divisions: Oxley; Blair; Wright

Area
  - Total: 1,094 km^{2} (422 sq mi)

Population
  - Total: 229,208 (2021 census)
  - Density: 209.51/km^{2} (542.64/sq mi)
- Website: City of Ipswich
LGAs around City of Ipswich
Somerset	Somerset	City of Brisbane
Lockyer Valley	City of Ipswich	City of Logan
Southern Downs	Scenic Rim	City of Logan

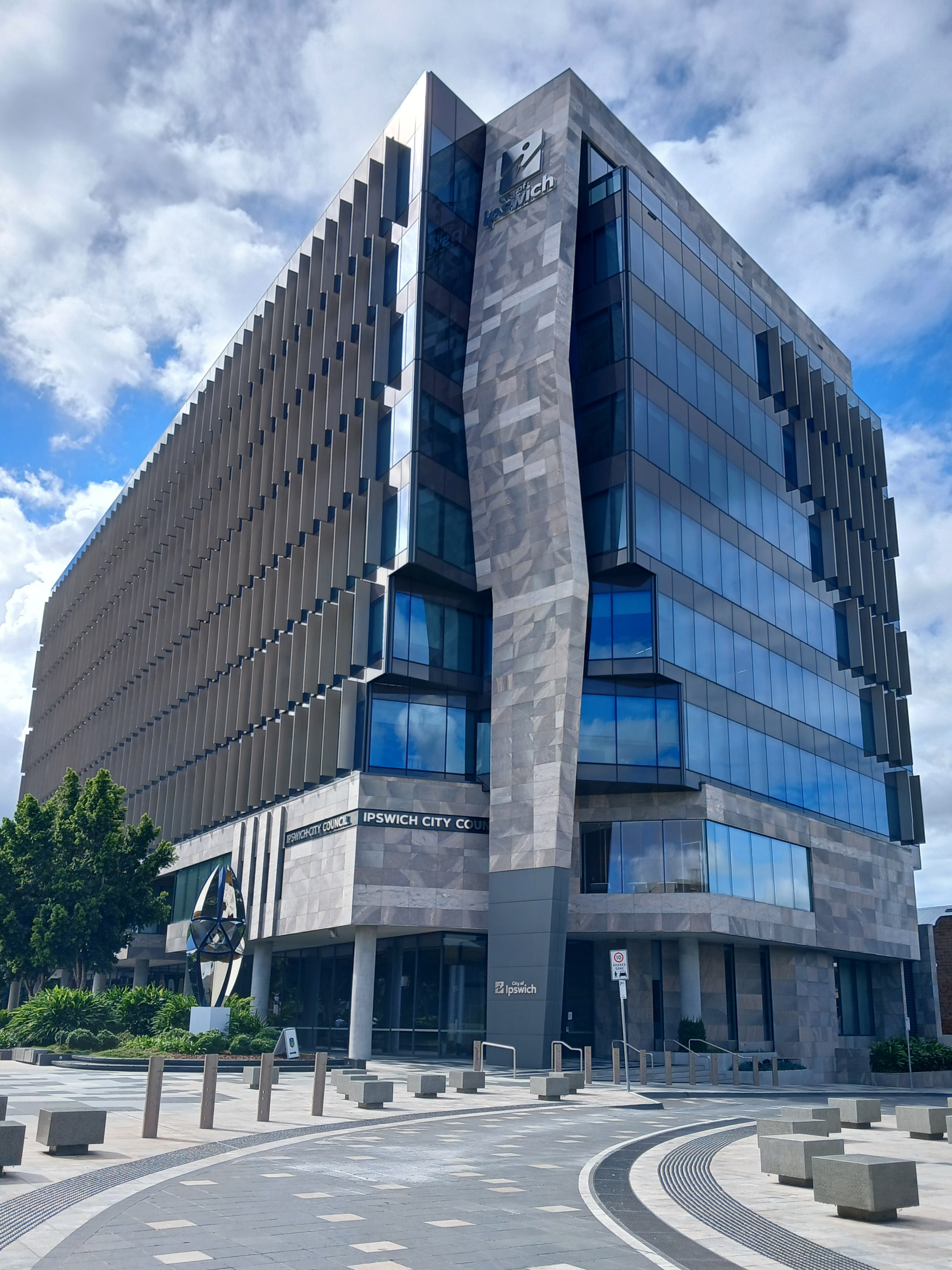
Council offices on Nicholas Street

The City of Ipswich is a local government area (LGA) located within the southwest of Greater Brisbane, which in turn, is situated within the vast South East region of the state of Queensland, Australia. Positioned between the City of Brisbane and the City of Logan to the east and the Scenic Rim Region to the south, the City of Ipswich also borders the Somerset and Lockyer Valley regions to the north and west, respectively. Ipswich is generally taken to include the urban area encompassing the historical city of Ipswich and the surrounding rural areas. By the 2021 census, the City of Ipswich, as a local government area, had a population of 229,208 people.

== Geography ==
The City of Ipswich is centrally located in the South East Queensland region of Australia. Ipswich governs the outer western portion of the Brisbane Metropolitan Area, Queensland, Australia. It covers an area of 1,094 square kilometres (422.4 sq mi) along the coast about 40 kilometres (25 mi) southwest of Brisbane CBD. To the east is the City of Brisbane local government area, and to the west are the rural and agricultural areas of the Brisbane, Lockyer and Fassifern Valleys.

== History ==
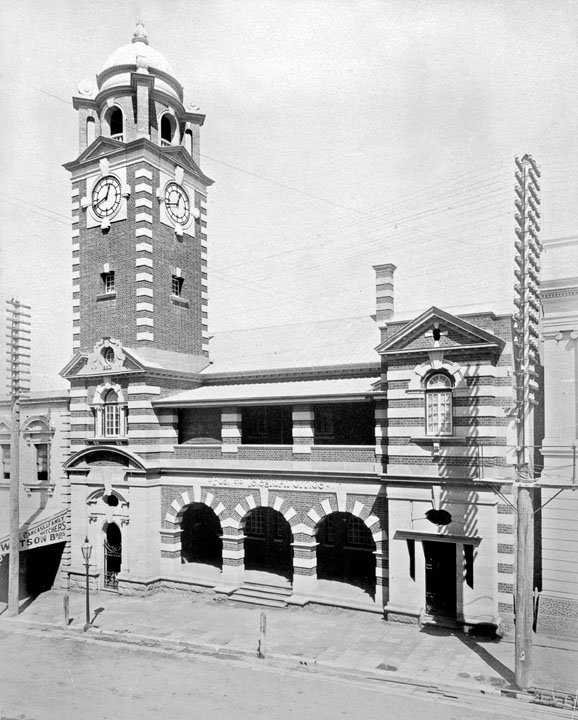
Ipswich Post Office, c. 1890

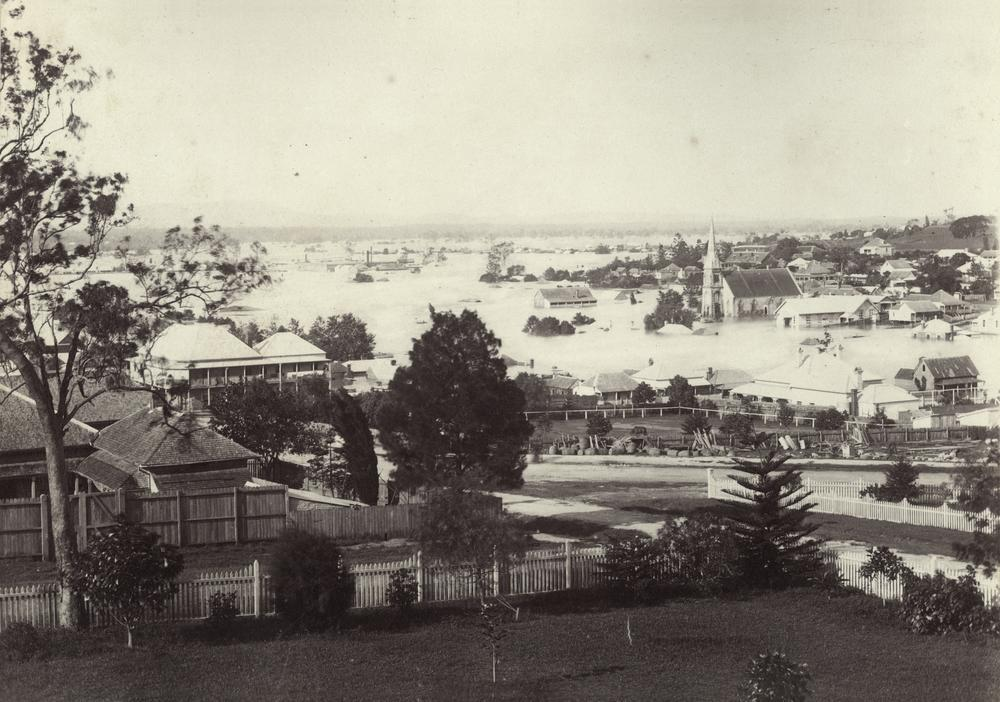
Ipswich in flood, 1893

Ipswich is the second-oldest local government area in Queensland, after Brisbane. On 16 November 1859, after the enactment of the Municipalities Act of 1858 in New South Wales, a petition containing 91 signatures was received by the Governor of New South Wales seeking to have Ipswich, which at the time had 3,000 people, granted municipal town status. The petition was gazetted the following day, and no counter-petition was received.

On 29 November, the letters patent authorised by Queen Victoria which were to make Queensland a separate colony were published in New South Wales, and the petition was forwarded to the new Queensland governor, Sir George Ferguson Bowen. On 10 December 1859, the same day that the letters patent were published in Queensland, the petition was regazetted. On 3 March 1860 the Borough of Ipswich was proclaimed, and its first elections were held on 19 April 1860, where John Murphy became its first Mayor. The Municipality's corporate logo was designed by Reverend Lacey H. Rumsey, the rector of St Paul's Church in Ipswich in 1861.

Ipswich applied on 22 November 1904 to become a City, the status being conferred by the Government of Queensland on 1 December 1904 and its first mayor was Hugh Reilly. On its declaration, the City of Ipswich covered only the central area of Ipswich itself – even what are today considered inner suburbs were parts of different entities.

=== The Greater Ipswich Scheme of 1916 ===
On 13 October 1916, a rationalisation of the local government areas in and around Ipswich was implemented. It involved the abolition of five shires:

- Brassall
- Bundanba
- Lowood
- Purga
- Walloon

resulting in:

- an enlarged City of Ipswich by including part of the Shire of Brassall and part of the Shire of Bundanba
- a new Shire of Ipswich by amalgamating part of the Shire of Brassall, part of the Shire of Bundanba, part of the Shire of Walloon and all of the Shire of Purga
- an enlarged Shire of Rosewood by including part of the Shire of Walloon
- an enlarged Shire of Esk by including all of the Shire of Lowood

=== Greater Ipswich Scheme of 1949 ===
On 29 January 1949, a new Local Government Act was enacted to further amalgamate local government in the Ipswich area, abolishing the Shire of Normanby and the Shire of Rosewood. The City of Ipswich was enlarged (from 12¼ square miles to 30 square miles) to include the more urban parts of the Shire of Moreton (formerly known as the Shire of Ipswich). The Shire of Moreton was then enlarged by the inclusion of the northern part of the Shire of Normanby and all the Shire of Rosewood. The southern part of the Shire of Normanby was transferred to an enlarged Shire of Boonah.

=== Further enlargement ===
The Shire of Moreton was amalgamated into the City of Ipswich on 11 March 1995.

=== Loss of rural areas ===
In March 2000, Ipswich ceded some rural territory in Mount Walker, Mutdapilly, Rosevale and Warrill View to the neighbouring Shire of Boonah. Following the major reforms of local government in Queensland, on 15 March 2008, Ipswich lost the largely rural areas of Harrisville and Peak Crossing in its southeast to the new Scenic Rim Region.

On 31 October 2012, a groundbreaking ceremony for the Ecco Ripley housing development project was conducted by then Ipswich mayor Paul Pisasale and Sekisui House.

== Demographics ==
In the 2016 census, the City of Ipswich had a population of 193,733 people.

In the 2021 census, the City of Ipswich had a population of 229,208 people.

== Council ==
Ipswich City Council

Leadership
- Mayor: Teresa Harding, Independent LNP

Structure
- Seats: Nine elected representatives, including a mayor and eight councillors
- Political groups: Independent Labor (4); Your Voice (2); Better Brighter Ipswich (1); Independent (1); Independent LNP (1)

Elections
- Last election: 16 March 2024

Ipswich City Council is composed of four wards (divisions), each with two councillors, along with a directly-elected mayor.

Until 2020, the council was made up of 10 councillors each representing one ward. Paul Pisasale, who was re-elected mayor in 2016, resigned on 6 June 2017 citing health concerns (specifically multiple sclerosis).

Division 7 Councillor Andrew Antoniolli and Deputy Mayor Paul Tully both contested the 2017 Ipswich mayoral by-election, held on 19 August 2017, with Antoniolli successful with 54.44% of the vote after preferences.

In May 2018, Antoniolli was charged with seven counts of corruption forcing him to stand down and administrators to take over Ipswich City Council.

In August 2018, the Queensland Government passed legislation to dismiss all of the councillors and replace them with an administrator.

=== Current composition ===
The current council, elected in 2024, is:

Position	Councillor	Party
Mayor	Teresa Harding	Independent LNP
Division 1	Pye Augustine	Independent Labor
Division 1	Jacob Madsen	Independent Labor
Division 2	Paul Tully	Your Voice of Experience
Division 2	Nicole Jonic	Your Voice of Experience
Division 3	Marnie Doyle	Better Brighter Ipswich
Division 3	Andrew Antoniolli	Independent
Division 4	Jim Madden	Independent Labor
Division 4	David Cullen	Independent Labor

== Past councillors ==
=== 2016–2018 (10 wards) ===
Year	Div 1	Div 2	Div 3	Div 4	Div 5	Div 6	Div 7	Div 8	Div 9	Div 10
Year	Councillor	Councillor	Councillor	Councillor	Councillor	Councillor	Councillor	Councillor	Councillor	Councillor
2016	David Morrison (Ind.)	Paul Tully (Ind. Labor)	Kerry Silver (Ind. Labor)	Kylie Stoneman (Ind. Labor)	Wayne Wendt (Ind. Labor)	Cheryl Bromage (Ind. Labor)	Andrew Antoniolli (Ind. Labor)	Charlie Pisasale (Ind.)	Sheila Ireland (Ind.)	David Pahlke (Ind.)
2017	David Morrison (Ind.)	Paul Tully (Ind. Labor)	Kerry Silver (Ind. Labor)	Kylie Stoneman (Ind. Labor)	Wayne Wendt (Ind. Labor)	Cheryl Bromage (Ind. Labor)	David Martin (Ind.)	Charlie Pisasale (Ind.)	Sheila Ireland (Ind.)	David Pahlke (Ind.)

=== 2020–present (four wards) ===
Year	Division 1		Division 2		Division 3		Division 4	
Year	Councillor	Councillor	Councillor	Councillor	Councillor	Councillor	Councillor	Councillor
2020	Sheila Ireland (Ind/Team Sheila Ireland)	Jacob Madsen (Ind. Labor)	Paul Tully (Your Voice)	Nicole Jonic (Your Voice)	Marnie Doyle (Ind/Ind. Labor/Better Brighter Ipswich)	Andrew Fechner (Ind/Better Brighter Ipswich)	Kate Kunzelmann (Ind. Labor)	Russell Milligan (Ind.)
2023	Sheila Ireland (Ind/Team Sheila Ireland)	Jacob Madsen (Ind. Labor)	Paul Tully (Your Voice)	Nicole Jonic (Your Voice)	Marnie Doyle (Ind/Ind. Labor/Better Brighter Ipswich)	Andrew Fechner (Ind/Better Brighter Ipswich)	Kate Kunzelmann (Ind. Labor)	Russell Milligan (Ind.)
2024	Sheila Ireland (Ind/Team Sheila Ireland)	Jacob Madsen (Ind. Labor)	Paul Tully (Your Voice)	Nicole Jonic (Your Voice)	Marnie Doyle (Ind/Ind. Labor/Better Brighter Ipswich)	Andrew Fechner (Ind/Better Brighter Ipswich)	Kate Kunzelmann (Ind. Labor)	Russell Milligan (Ind.)
2024	Pye Augustine (Ind. Labor)	Jacob Madsen (Ind. Labor)	Paul Tully (Your Voice)	Nicole Jonic (Your Voice)	Marnie Doyle (Ind/Ind. Labor/Better Brighter Ipswich)	Andrew Antoniolli (Ind.)	Jim Madden (Ind. Labor)	David Cullen (Ind. Labor)

== Election results ==
=== 2024 ===
2024 Queensland local elections: Ipswich
Party	Votes	%	Swing	Seats	Change
Independent Labor	83,359	37.07	−3.34	4	▲2
Independent	43,406	19.30	+2.81	1	Steady
Your Voice of Experience	27,288	12.13	−8.37	2	Steady
Better Brighter Ipswich	23,613	10.50	+10.50	1	▼1
Working For Our Community	21,621	9.61	+9.61	0	Steady
Greens	15,355	6.83	+6.83	0	Steady
Team Sheila Ireland	10,256	4.56	+4.56	0	▼1
Formal votes	224,898	100.0			
Formal ballots	112,449	89.32	+0.58		
Informal ballots	13,450	10.68	−0.58		
Total	125,899	100.0		8	
Registered voters / turnout	155,753	80.83	+2.87		

=== 2020 ===
2020 Queensland local elections: Ipswich
Party	Votes	%	Swing	Seats	Change
Independent Labor	37,280	40.41		2	▼4
Your Voice of Experience	18,917	20.50	+20.50	2	▲2
Independent	15,212	16.49		4	Steady
Team WORK	7,483	8.11		0	Steady
Liberal Democrats	7,433	8.06		0	Steady
Independent LNP	5,931	6.43		0	Steady
Formal votes	184,512	100.0			
Formal ballots	92,256	88.73			
Informal ballots	11,720	11.27			
Total	103,976	100.0		8	▼2
Registered voters / turnout	133,368	77.96			

== Suburbs ==
The City of Ipswich includes the following settlements:

Urban:

- Augustine Heights
- Barellan Point
- Basin Pocket
- Bellbird Park
- Blacksoil
- Blackstone
- Booval
- Brassall
- Brookwater
- Bundamba
- Carole Park
- Camira
- Churchill
- Chuwar
- Coalfalls
- Collingwood Park
- Dinmore
- East Ipswich
- Eastern Heights
- Ebenezer
- Ebbw Vale
- Flinders View
- Gailes
- Goodna
- Haigslea
- Ipswich
- Karalee
- Karrabin
- Leichhardt
- Moores Pocket
- Muirlea
- New Chum
- Newtown
- North Booval
- North Ipswich
- North Tivoli
- One Mile
- Raceview
- Redbank
- Redbank Plains
- Ripley
- Riverview
- Rosewood
- Sadliers Crossing
- Silkstone
- Springfield
- Springfield Central
- Springfield Lakes
- Swanbank
- Tivoli
- West Ipswich
- Woodend
- Wulkuraka
- Yamanto

Rural:

- Amberley
- Ashwell
- Calvert
- Deebing Heights
- Ebenezer
- Goolman
- Grandchester
- Haigslea
- Ironbark
- Jeebropilly
- Lanefield
- Limestone Ridges^{1}
- Marburg
- Mount Forbes^{1}
- Mount Marrow
- Mutdapilly^{1}
- Peak Crossing^{1}
- Pine Mountain
- Purga
- Rosewood
- South Ripley
- Spring Mountain
- Tallegalla
- Thagoona
- The Bluff
- Walloon
- White Rock^{2}
- Willowbank
- Woolshed

^{1} - split with Scenic Rim Region
^{2} - not to be confused with White Rock in Cairns Region

== Initiatives ==
Beginning in 1994 Ipswich adopted an innovative, community-based, information technology project which aimed to make the city a technology hub at the forefront of the growing move towards the information superhighway. The most prominent feature of the initiative, which was called Global Info-Links, was the development of a new library with free public internet access and the development of a wide area network to which people could subscribe.

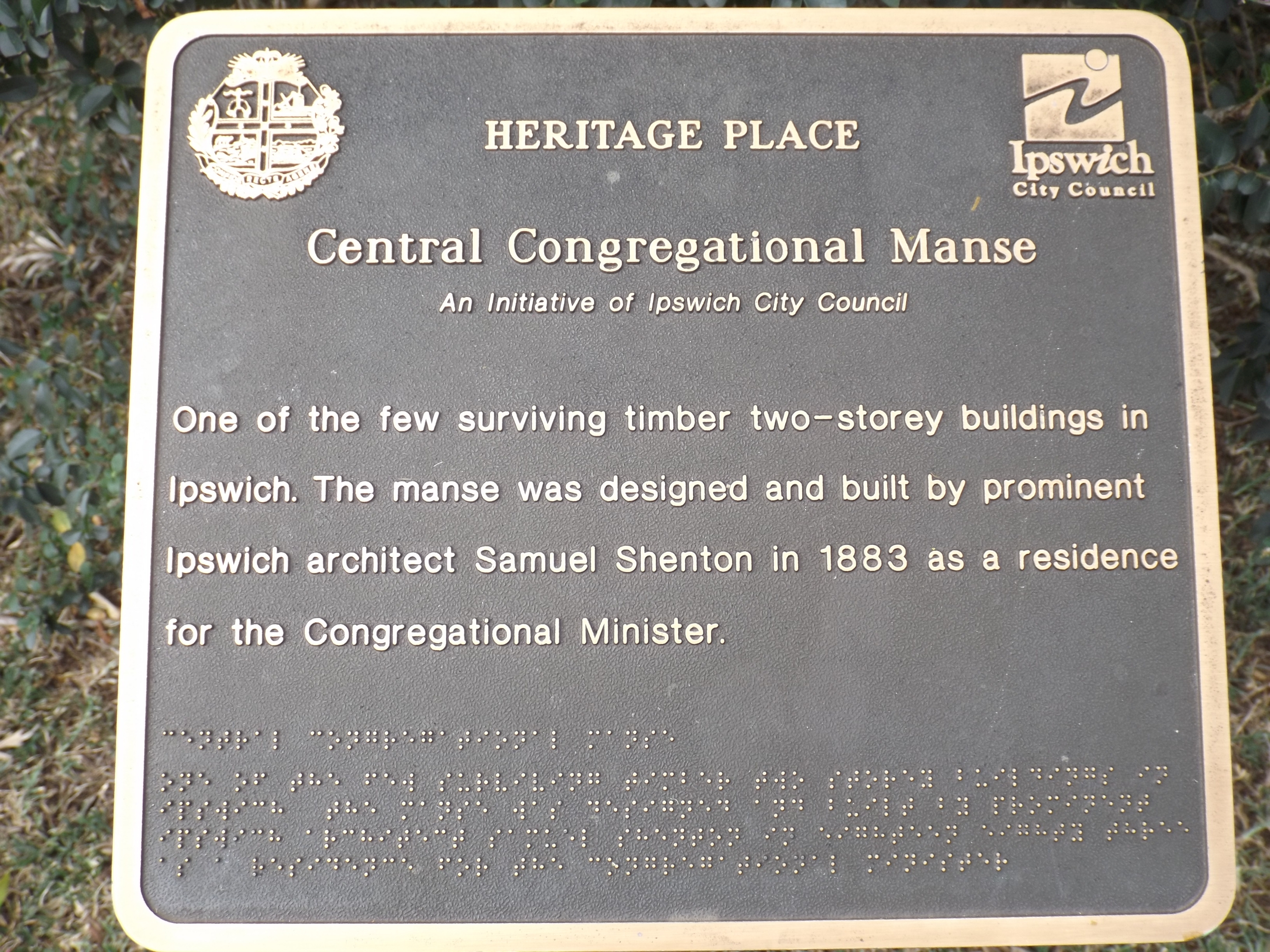
Council plaque at the Central Congregational Church Manse, 2015

In October 2000, the council began erecting cast brass plaques at significant heritage sites.

== Services ==
Ipswich City Council operates four public libraries at Ipswich Central, Redbank, Redbank Plains and Springfield Central. It also operates a mobile library service to Booval, Brassall, Camira, Flinders View (Winston Glades) Goodna, Grandchester, Karalee, Marburg, Rosewood, South Ripley, Walloon, and Willowbank.

== Sister cities ==
- Nerima City, Japan (from 1994)
- Hyderabad, India (from 2010)
