= Division of Blair =

Australian federal electoral division

Coordinates: 27.115°S 152.462°E

Blair Australian House of Representatives Division
- Interactive map of boundaries since the 2019 federal election
- Created: 1998
- MP: Shayne Neumann
- Party: Australian Labor Party
- Namesake: Harold Blair
- Electors: 142,021 (2025)
- Area: 6,472 km^{2} (2,498.9 sq mi)
- Demographic: Provincial

The Division of Blair is an Australian Electoral Division in Queensland. The current MP is Shayne Neumann of the Australian Labor Party (ALP).

== Geography ==
Since 1984, federal electoral division boundaries in Australia have been determined at redistributions by a redistribution committee appointed by the Australian Electoral Commission. Redistributions occur for the boundaries of divisions in a particular state, and they occur every seven years, or sooner if a state's representation entitlement changes or when divisions of a state are malapportioned.

== History ==
The division was created in 1998 and is named after Harold Blair, an Aboriginal singer and civil rights campaigner. The Division is based on Ipswich, and extends from rural and exurban areas west of Brisbane to the Scenic Rim and Lockyer Valley regions.

The founder of One Nation, Pauline Hanson, contested Blair in 1998. Her previous seat, Oxley, had been essentially split in half in the redistribution ahead of the election. Oxley was reconfigured into an exclusively Brisbane-based seat that tilted strongly toward Labor, while most of the rural area near Ipswich shifted to Blair. Although it was a very safe Liberal seat on paper, it contained most of Hanson's base, so it was a natural choice for Hanson to attempt to transfer. The Liberals, Nationals and Labor preferenced each other ahead of Hanson, allowing Liberal challenger Cameron Thompson to win on the eighth count. Thompson overtook the Labor candidate on National preferences, then defeated Hanson on Labor preferences.

Thompson held the seat without serious difficulty in the next two elections, and it was widely considered as a safe Liberal seat. In the 2006 redistribution, the 2004 Liberal margin of 11.2% was almost halved to 5.7%. Conservative-leaning Esk, Nanango and Kingaroy were transferred to Maranoa, while Blair was pushed further into Ipswich and Boonah. Blair had been rated as having received more funding promises from the Howard government than any other electorate in the country. The redistribution pushed Blair just outside the range of seats Labor needed to win government. In the 2007 election, Thompson was defeated by Labor challenger Shayne Neumann, with a 10.2 percent swing to Labor. Since then, the growth of Ipswich has allowed Neumann to consolidate his hold on the seat. For instance, in 2013, he actually picked up a small swing in his favour even as Labor lost government. In 2016, Neumann made Blair a safe Labor seat with 58.9 percent of the vote. However, in the following 2019 federal election, Neumann suffered one of the largest swings against a Labor member, with a primary vote of just 31.3%, cutting the two-party preferred vote to 51.2%, a massive and unexpected swing against him of 6.9% on a two-party preferred basis. This was in keeping with the heavy swing to the Liberal National Party (LNP) in Queensland in that election. In 2022 the seat swung back to Neumann somewhat, with 35% of the primary vote and 55.2% of the two-party preferred vote, with the 4.02% swing in his favour slightly higher than the national swing to Labor of 3.66%.

== Members ==
Image	Member	Party	Term	Notes
	Cameron Thompson (1960–)	Liberal	3 October 1998 – 24 November 2007	Lost seat
	Shayne Neumann (1961–)	Labor	24 November 2007 – present	Incumbent

== Election results ==
2025 Australian federal election: Blair
Party	Candidate	Votes	%	±%
Labor	Shayne Neumann	42,825	36.62	+1.61
Liberal National	Carl Mutzelburg	31,797	27.19	−1.70
Greens	Paul Toner	12,104	10.35	−2.23
One Nation	Brendan Kross	11,344	9.70	−0.29
Legalise Cannabis	Anthony Hopkins	5,353	4.58	+4.58
People First	Kathryn Chadwick	4,421	3.78	+3.78
Trumpet of Patriots	Edward McDonald	3,769	3.22	+3.22
Family First	John Purdon	2,334	2.00	+2.00
Animal Justice	Angela Lowery	1,874	1.60	−0.85
Libertarian	Anthony Bull	1,132	0.97	−1.98
Total formal votes		116,953	93.43	−1.27
Informal votes		8,219	6.57	+1.27
Turnout		125,172	88.15	+1.04
Two-party-preferred result
Labor	Shayne Neumann	65,156	55.71	+0.48
Liberal National	Carl Mutzelburg	51,797	44.29	−0.48
Labor hold		Swing	+0.48	
