= Paul Pisasale =

Australian politician and convicted extortionist (born 1951)

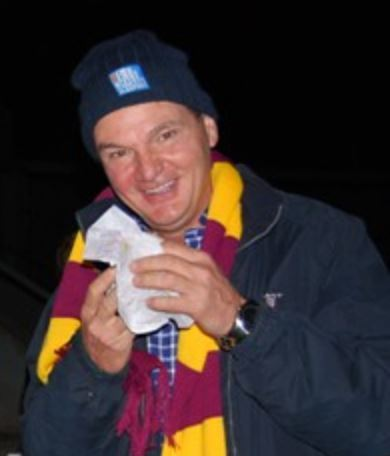
- Born: 9 September 1951 (age 75)
- Occupation: Former mayor of the City of Ipswich
- Criminal charges: Extortion, corruption, sexual assault, perjury, fraud, drug possession, secret commission by an agent, and fraud of property
- Criminal penalty: Initial charges resulted in two years in jail to be suspended after one year, and an additional sentence for seven and half years in jail for subsequent charges

Paul Pisasale is an Australian former politician and convicted extortionist who served as the mayor of the City of Ipswich in Queensland. Pisasale was mayor of Ipswich from 2004 to 2017, making him one of Queensland's longest-serving mayors, and was last elected in 2016 with 83.45% of the popular vote. He resigned as mayor in 2017 following a raid on his office by the Queensland Crime and Corruption Commission. He was subsequently charged with corruption in 2017. He was committed to stand trial on a number of other charges in 2019, including charges of sexual assault where he was accused of "unlawfully and indecently" assaulting an Ipswich woman, and charges of perjury. Pisasale subsequently pleaded guilty to these charges which included two counts of sexual assault, official corruption, unlawful drug possession, 27 counts of fraud, secret commission by an agent, and fraud of property.

== Criminal convictions ==
Pisasale was convicted of two counts of extortion on 24 July 2019 where he was found to have impersonated a private investigator as part of a plot to unlawfully obtain $10,000 from another individual. His appeal against those convictions was dismissed in March 2020.

Pisasale later pleaded guilty to a range of additional charges including perjury, fraud, corruption, and sexual assault. His criminal behaviour was described as "systematic corruption and failings" whereby Pisasale "exploited and manipulated" his position in the Council including the commission of sexual assault offences within his former official chambers.

Pisasale was initially sentenced to two years in jail to be suspended after 12 months for his extortion offences, and commenced his sentences at the Wolston Correctional Centre, where he was admitted to hospital from an exercise-related injury within days of his incarceration. He was sentenced to an additional seven and a half years in jail for the crimes he admitted in 2020, and was eligible for parole from October 2022. Pisasale was released from prison on parole as of December 2022.

== Honors and other awards ==
In 2010, Pisasale was awarded the title of "Queensland Local Hero" by the National Australia Day Council. This award has been withdrawn as of June 2025 due to recognition of his corrupt and dishonest conduct as supported by the findings of the court and his subsequent jail time.

2012 saw Pisasale receive the Queensland Civil Justice Award for going beyond the call of duty in the 2011 floods. This award has also been withdrawn. Link to site

In 2013, he was also awarded a Life Sciences award for championing master-planned communities, job creation, protection of the environment and being an advocate for education by Life Sciences Queensland, an industry-led organisation which works with government and industry. This award has also been withdrawn. Link to site
