= Goolman, Queensland =

Goolman City of Ipswich, Queensland
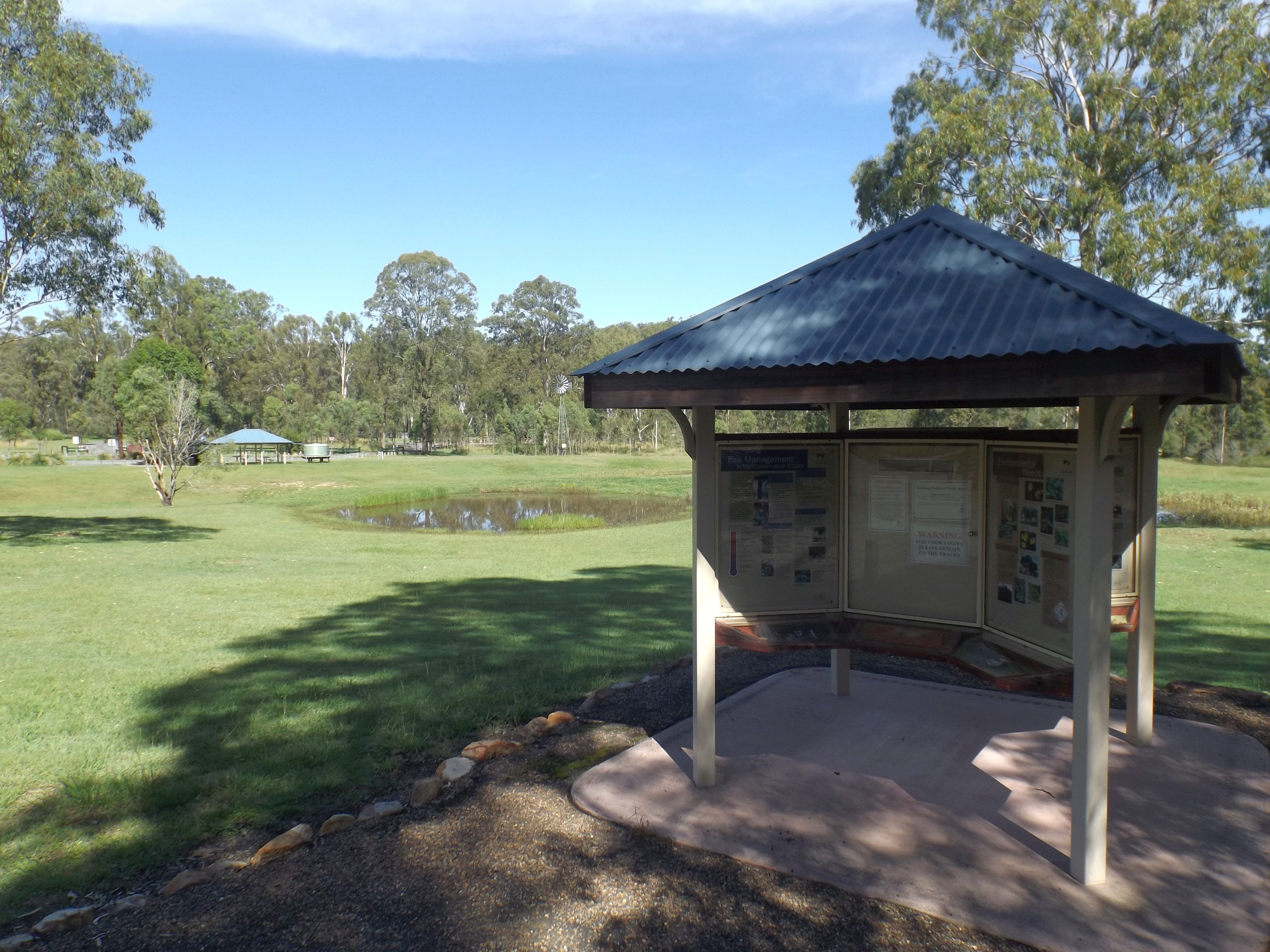
- Information display at Hardings Paddock Picnic Area, 2015

- Coordinates: 27.7338°S 152.7677°E
- Population: 47 (2021 census)
  - Density: 2.146/km^{2} (5.56/sq mi)
- Postcode(s): 4306
- Area: 21.9 km^{2} (8.5 sq mi)
- Time zone: AEST (UTC+10:00)
- Location: 16.7 km (10 mi) S of Ipswich CBD; 54.6 km (34 mi) SW of Brisbane CBD
- LGA(s): City of Ipswich
- State electorate(s): Scenic Rim
- Federal division(s): Blair
Suburbs around Goolman:
Purga	Deebing Heights	South Ripley
Purga	Goolman	South Ripley
Peak Crossing	Peak Crossing	Peak Crossing

Goolman is a rural locality in the City of Ipswich, Queensland, Australia. In the 2021 census, Goolman had a population of 47 people.

== Geography ==
The east of Goolman contains the northern foothills of the Flinders Peak Group. The slopes remain vegetated with little development occurring in the area.

Ipswich – Boonah Road (State Route 93) runs along part of the western boundary.

Much of the locality is undeveloped. The land in the south-west of the locality is predominantly used for grazing on native vegetation with some quarrying.

== History ==
The locality name Goolman comes from nearby Mount Goolman, which in turn derives its name from stone axe in the Yuggera language.

Residents in the Fassifern Valley petitioned the Queensland Government to build a railway line to their district, and the first section of the Dugandan railway line was opened on 10 July 1882 as far as Harrisville. This is considered to be Queensland's first branch railway. Goolman was served by the Goolman railway station on the Ipswich Boonah Road (27.7365°S 152.7416°E). The branch was extended to Dugandan on 12 September 1887. The line closed in 1964.

== Demographics ==
In the 2016 census, Goolman had a population of 42 people.

In the 2021 census, Goolman had a population of 47 people.

== Education ==
There are no schools in Goolman. The nearest government primary schools are:

- Peak Crossing State School in Peak Crossing to the south-west
- Deebing Heights State School in neighbouring Deebing Heights to the north
- Amberley District State School in Yamanto to the north
- Ripley Valley State School in neighbouring South Ripley to the north-east

The nearest government secondary schools are Bremer State High School in Ipswich to the north and Ripley Valley State Secondary College in South Ripley. There are also non-government schools in Ipswich and its suburbs.

== Attractions ==
The Flinders - Goolman Conservation Estate covers 1,900 hectares and includes several peaks including Flinders Peak, Mount Goolman, Mount Blain and Mount Cathrine. Hardings Paddocks Picnic Area is located in Goolman. It includes horse riding facilities, walking tracks and a camping area.
