= Ipswich–Boonah–Rathdowney Road =

Road in Queensland, Australia

Ipswich–Boonah–Rathdowney Road Queensland

General information
- Type: Rural road
- Length: 87.8 km (55 mi)
- Route number(s): State Route 93

Major junctions
- North end: Cunningham Highway (M15), Yamanto
- Beaudesert–Boonah Road (State Route 90); Boonah–Fassifern Road (State Route 90)
- South end: Mount Lindesay Highway (National Route 13), Rathdowney

Location(s)
- Major settlements: Boonah

Ipswich–Boonah–Rathdowney Road is a continuous 87.8 kilometres (54.6 mi) road route in the Ipswich and Scenic Rim regions of Queensland, Australia. It has two official names, Ipswich–Boonah Road and Boonah–Rathdowney Road. The entire route is signed as State Route 93, and much of it is also part of Tourist Drive 16.

Part of the Ipswich–Boonah Road (number 211) is a state-controlled regional road and the remainder is a state-controlled district road. All of the Boonah–Rathdowney Road (number 213) is a state-controlled district road rated as a local road of regional significance (LRRS).

== Route description ==
The road commences as Ipswich–Boonah Road at an intersection with the Cunningham Highway in Yamanto, a suburb of Ipswich. It runs generally south towards Boonah, passing through Purga, Peak Crossing and Milbong. Tourist Drive 16 joins the road at Peak Crossing.

In the locality of Coulson, before reaching Boonah, the road intersects with the Beaudesert–Boonah Road (State Route 90) which runs to the east. State Route 90 runs south, concurrent with State Route 93, for 6.8 kilometres (4.2 mi) before exiting to the west.

The road enters Boonah as Coronation Drive and intersects with the Boonah–Fassifern Road (State Route 90) which runs to the west. The name changes to Boonah–Rathdowney Road and it exits to the south as Yeates Avenue. It passes through Wallaces Creek and Coochin before turning east to Maroon and on to Rathdowney, where it ends at an intersection with the Mount Lindesay Highway. In the locality of Coochin, Tourist Drive 21 (The Falls Drive) branches off to the south-west on its way to Killarney.

=== State Route 90 ===
State Route 90 runs from Fassifern on the Cunningham Highway to Broadbeach, travelling via Boonah, Beaudesert and Nerang. From Beaudesert it follows the Beaudesert–Nerang Road and the Nerang–Broadbeach Road.

=== Tourist Drive 16 ===
Tourist Drive 16, also known as the Scenic Rim Drive, runs from Marburg on the Warrego Highway to Tamborine, travelling via Rosewood, Boonah, Rathdowney and Beaudesert. It joins State Route 93 at Peak Crossing and follows it to Rathdowney.

== History of Boonah roads ==
The first pastoral run in the Boonah district was taken up in 1844. From 1868 the large pastoral runs were subdivided and the settlement that became Boonah grew rapidly as new settlers moved in.

A road from Ipswich enabled this growth, and was the only means of access until the Fassifern railway line arrived in 1887.

Land was cleared and farms established in several areas around Boonah. To the south this development followed Teviot Brook and its tributaries Wallace Creek, Black Rock Creek and Flagstone Creek. Part of this development included a road to service the farms. The first creamery in Boonah was built about 1894.

== History of Rathdowney roads ==
The Rathdowney area was explored by Europeans in 1828 and was made available for settlement in 1842. In 1876 a large freehold estate in the district was named Rathdowney Station, and the settlement was named for the station. A road from Beaudesert was built to service the settlement, and this was the only means of access until 1911 when the Beaudesert Shire Tramway was extended to Rathdowney.

Land clearing and farm establishment occurred as parts of the large pastoral runs were subdivided, including to the west along the Logan River and Burnett Creek. A road was built to support the farms. In time the development of farms and roads from Boonah and Rathdowney reached a common point, and a connecting road was the result.

== Major Intersections ==
All distances are from Google Maps.

LGA	Location	km	mi	Destinations	Notes
Ipswich	Yamanto / Purga midpoint	0	0.0	Cunningham Highway (M15) east – Brisbane, Flinders View / west – Amberley, Willowbank	Northern end of Ipswich–Boonah–Rathdowney Road. Continues south as Ipswich–Boonah Road (State Route 93)
Ipswich	Yamanto / Purga midpoint	0	0.0	Centenary Highway (A5) southeast – Deebing Heights	Eastbound access to Centenary Highway
Ipswich	Purga	0.2	0.12	Centenary Highway (A5) west – Amberley, Willowbank	Westbound exit from Centenary Highway
Ipswich / Scenic Rim midpoint	Peak Crossing	13.7	8.5	Flinders Street – to: Warrill View–Peak Crossing Road – southwest – Harrisville, Warrill View	
Ipswich / Scenic Rim midpoint	Peak Crossing	13.7	8.5	Flinders Street – to: Peak Crossing–Churchbank Weir Road (Tourist Drive 16) west – Mutdapilly	Tourist Drive 16 joins the road
Scenic Rim	Coulson	34.5	21.4	Beaudesert–Boonah Road (State Route 90) east – Beaudesert	Northern concurrency terminus with State Route 90
Scenic Rim	Boonah	41.3	25.7	Boonah–Fassifern Road (State Route 90) west – Fassifern	Southern Concurrency terminus with State Route 90.
Scenic Rim	Boonah	41.3	25.7		Road continues south as Boonah–Rathdowney Road (State Route 93)
Scenic Rim	Coochin	56.1	34.9	Carneys Creek Road (Tourist Drive 21) southwest – Carneys Creek, Killarney	Tourist Drive 21 starts / ends at this point
Scenic Rim	Rathdowney	87.8	54.6	Mount Lindesay Highway (National Route 13) north – Beaudesert / south – Palen Creek, Mount Lindesay	Southern end of Boonah–Rathdowney Road (State Route 93)
1.000 mi = 1.609 km; 1.000 km = 0.621 mi: Concurrency terminus; Incomplete access; Route transition

== See also ==
- Boonah Butter Factory
- Coochin Coochin Homestead
- List of road routes in Queensland
- List of tourist drives in Queensland
- List of numbered roads in Queensland
