= Ripley, Queensland =

Ripley
- Suburb
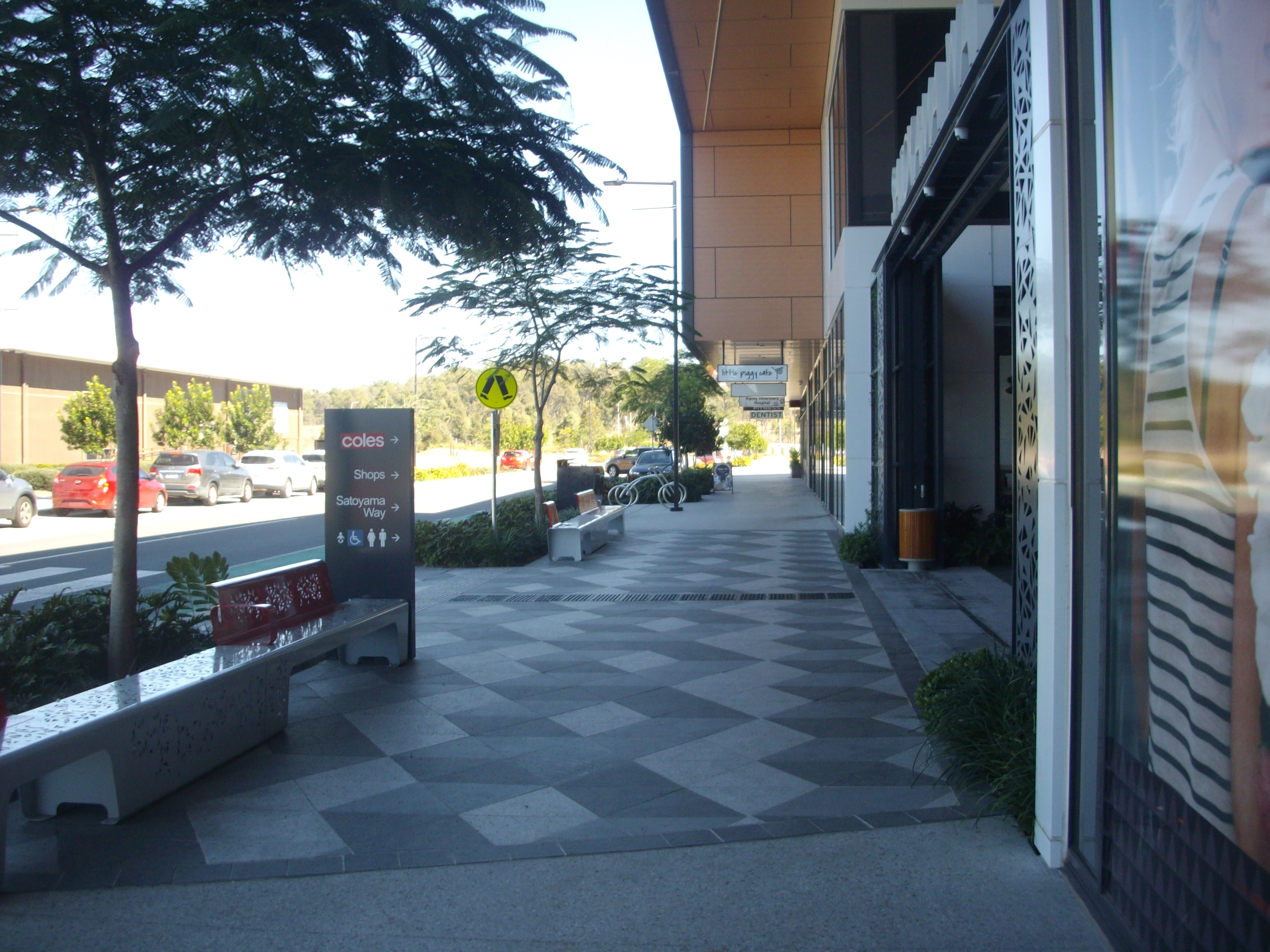
- Ripley Town Centre, 2020

- Coordinates: 27.6727°S 152.7827°E
- Country: Australia
- State: Queensland
- City: Ipswich
- LGA: City of Ipswich
- Location: 7.4 km (4.6 mi) S of Ipswich CBD; 42.1 km (26.2 mi) SW of Brisbane CBD

Government
  - State electorate: Ipswich
  - Federal division: Blair

Area
  - Total: 12.8 km^{2} (4.9 sq mi)

Population
  - Total: 4,288 (2021 census)
  - Density: 335.0/km^{2} (868/sq mi)
- Time zone: UTC+10:00 (AEST)
- Postcode: 4306
Suburbs around Ripley
Flinders View	Flinders View	Swanbank
Yamanto	Ripley	Swanbank
Deebing Heights	South Ripley	South Ripley

Ripley is a suburb in the City of Ipswich, Queensland, Australia. In the 2021 census, Ripley had a population of 4,288 people.

== Geography ==
The eastern boundary of Ripley is aligned with Bundamba Creek. The Centenary Highway passes through the south east corner of Ripley. Ripley is located within the Ripley Valley, and takes its name from the valley.

== History ==
Ripley is situated in the Yugarabul traditional Indigenous Australian country.

The historical settlement of Ripley dates back to the mid-1800s as a farming community.

Bundamba Upper State School opened on 2 February 1874. In 1909, it was renamed Ripley State School. It closed in 1930 due to low student numbers. It was at 1166-1176 Ripley Road in neighbouring South Ripley.

Cityhope Church was built in 1998 by a congregation established in Ipswich in the mid 1960s.

In 2007, it was announced that Ripley would be a master-planned urban development.

Ripley Town Centre opened its first stage in May 2018, consisting of 9,000 square metres (97,000 sq ft) including a supermarket, medical centre, gym, and approximately 20 other stores.

Ripley Central State School opened for Term 1 on 23 January 2023.

== Demographics ==
In the 2016 census, Ripley had a population of 1,405 people.

In the 2021 census, Ripley had a population of 4,288 people.

== Ripley urban development ==
The Ripley area is part of the Brisbane metropolitan western growth corridor project. The development, known as Ecco Ripley is in response to the local and state governments' solicitation for land releases to alleviate expected and forecasted population growth from the general population growth of the existing communities, as well as growth from interstate and overseas migration.

Once the area is fully developed, the Ripley district is expected to have a population of 120,000 people with an estimated 50,000 residential dwellings. The city development will provide employment with 200,000 job positions estimated. The Ripley development is in proximity of the suburbs and areas within the western growth corridor and Ripley district, such as South Ripley, Swanbank, Deebing Heights and White Rock, with suitable land for new residential, business and industrial developments.

The development is to be the country's largest planned community.

== Transport ==
Ripley is serviced by bus route 531 between Springfield Central and Yamanto.

Planned transportation links includes an extension of the Springfield railway line to Ipswich, and commuter railway stations between Ipswich and Springfield.

Ripley holds a key position in the proposed Ipswich to Springfield Central Public Transport Corridor (I2S), a 25 kilometre rail line planned to connect Springfield Central with Ipswich, passing through several steadily expanding suburbs including Ripley and Redbank Plains. The plan sets out nine new stations, with stops expected at Ripley Town Centre and an additional location provisionally named ‘Ripley North’.

The I2S corridor is viewed as a vital bit of infrastructure to deal with the area’s strong growth, as the population across Ipswich is forecast to double by 2046. The line is intended to provide a dependable alternative to car travel for more than 200,000 people, helping to support sustainable development throughout the Ripley Valley and neighbouring areas.

The Ripley Road upgrade is a major infrastructure initiative designed to support urban growth and improve long term transport efficiency in one of South East Queensland’s steadily growing corridors. The project delivers a transformation of Ripley Road into a standard four lane urban arterial between the Cunningham Highway and Fischer Road, enhancing access, reducing congestion, and improving safety for all road users.

== Education ==
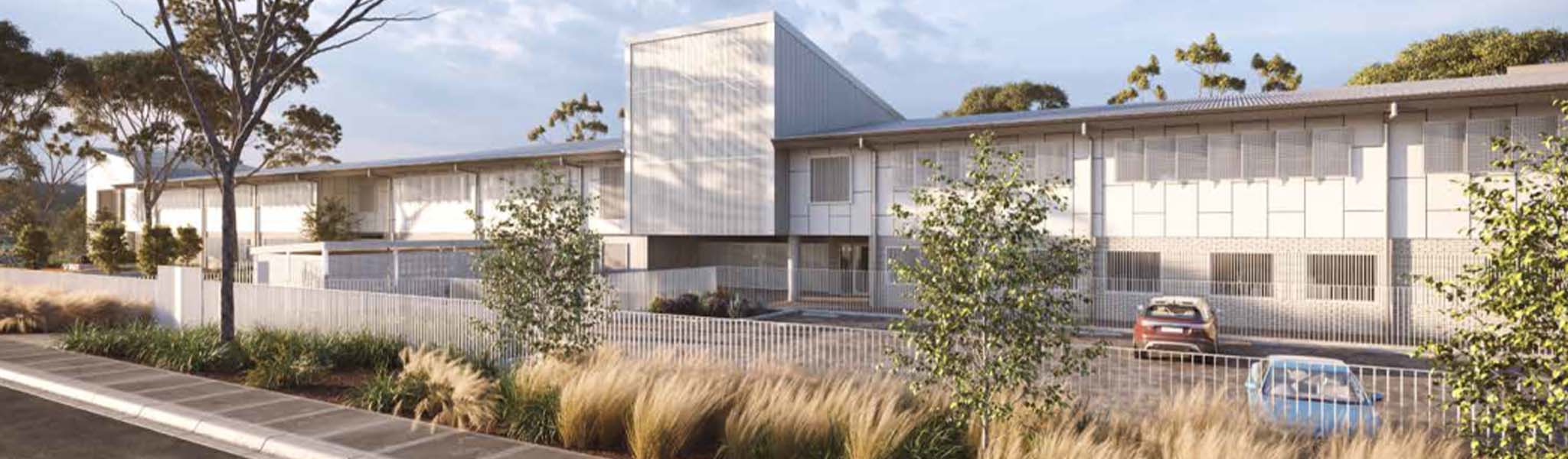
Ripley Central State School, 2024

Ripley Central State School is a government primary (Prep-6) school at 103 Binnies Road (27.6718°S 152.7796°E). As at August 2022, the school had an enrolment of 201 students with 17 teachers (15 full-time equivalent) and 14 non-teaching staff (10 full-time equivalent). The school has been planned to support up to 1,600 students in the long-term. The suburb is also serviced by the Ripley Valley State School in neighbouring South Ripley to the south-east and Raceview State School in Raceview to the north.

There are no secondary schools in Ripley. The nearest government secondary schools are Ripley Valley State Secondary College in South Ripley and Bremer State High School in Ipswich CBD to the north. There are also a number of non-government schools in the Ipswich CBD and other Ipswich suburbs.

== Amenities ==
Ripley Town Centre is on Main Street (27.6825°S 152.8016°E).

Cityhope Church is at 7 Rex Hills Drive (27.6576°S 152.7808°E). It is affiliated with the Australian Christian Churches.
