= Peak Crossing, Queensland =

Peak Crossing
- Suburb
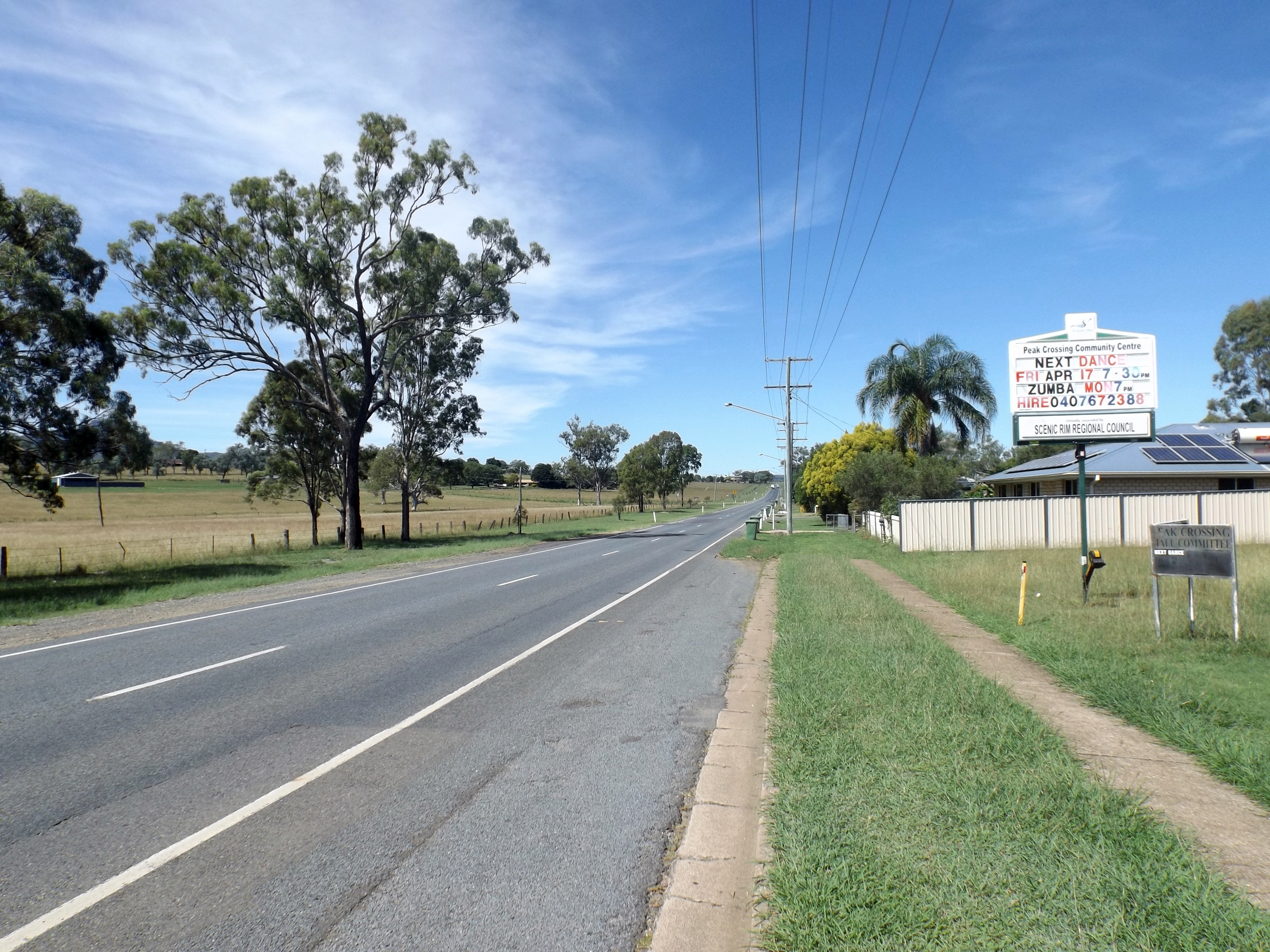
- Ipswich Boonah Road, 2015

- Interactive map of Peak Crossing
- Coordinates: 27.7836°S 152.7303°E
- Country: Australia
- State: Queensland
- LGAs: City of Ipswich; Scenic Rim Region
- Location: 19.7 km (12.2 mi) S of Ipswich; 28.4 km (17.6 mi) N of Boonah; 53.8 km (33.4 mi) NW of Beaudesert; 58.6 km (36.4 mi) SW of Brisbane

Government
  - State electorate: Scenic Rim
  - Federal divisions: Blair; Wright

Area
  - Total: 91.5 km^{2} (35.3 sq mi)

Population
  - Total: 1,016 (2021 census)
  - Density: 11.104/km^{2} (28.759/sq mi)
- Time zone: UTC+10:00 (AEST)
- Postcode: 4306
Suburbs around Peak Crossing
Mutdapilly	Purga; Goolman	South Ripley
Mutdapilly	Peak Crossing	Lyons
Harrisville	Limestone Ridges; Washpool	Undullah

Peak Crossing is a rural locality split between the City of Ipswich and the Scenic Rim Region of Queensland, Australia. In the 2021 census, Peak Crossing had a population of 1,016.

== Geography ==
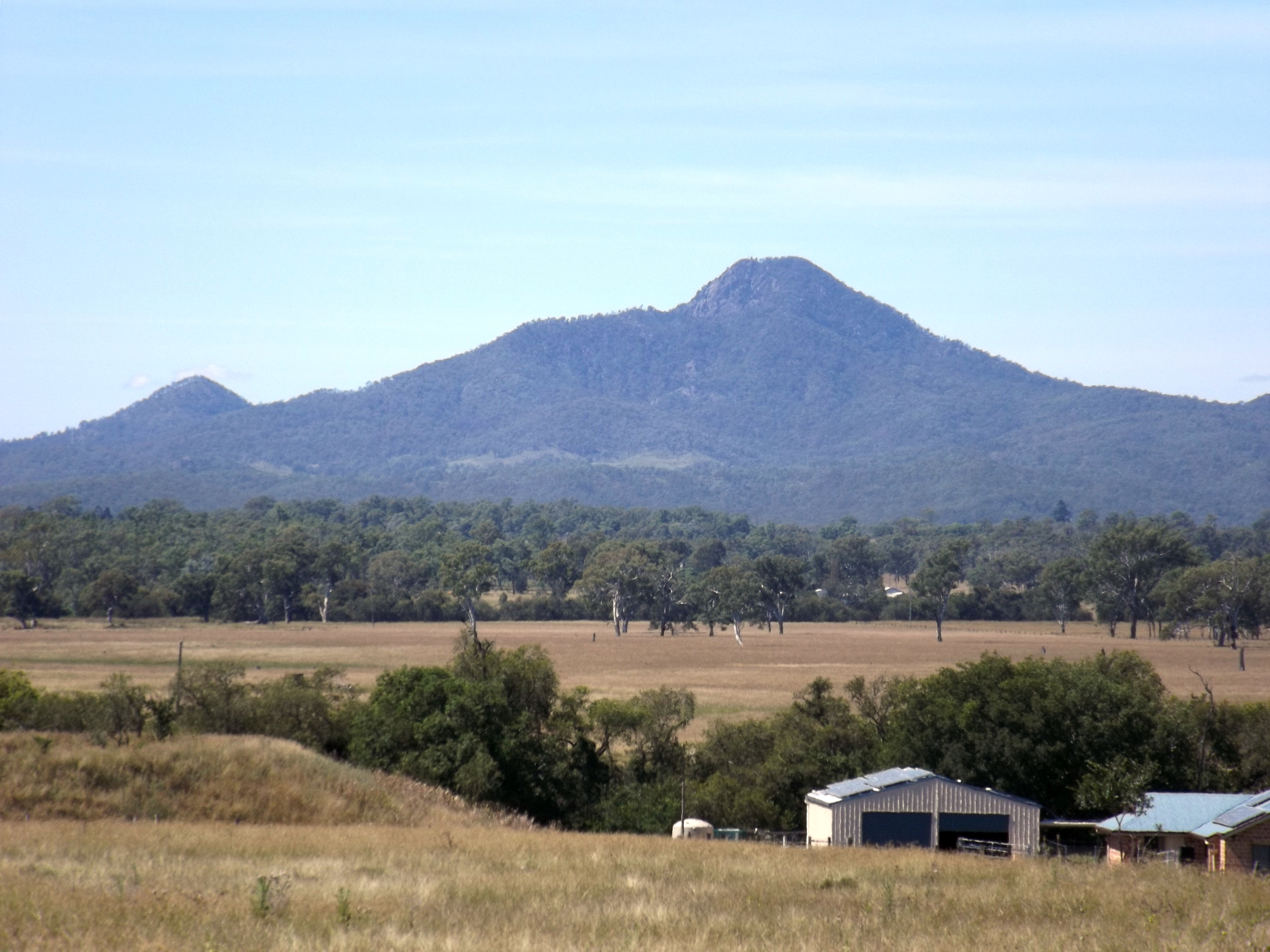
Flinders Peak, 2015

Peak Crossing is located 20 kilometres (12 mi) south of Ipswich. The town is surrounded by farming land, mostly small cropping. The western boundary is marked by the east branch of Warrill Creek, a tributary of the Bremer River. Just upstream from where the road joining Peak Crossing with Mutdapilly crosses Warrill Creek is the Churchbank Weir.

The eastern parts of Peak Crossing are dominated by the naturally vegetated central peaks of the Flinders Peak Group. These include Mount Goolman, Ivorys Rock (Muntambin), Mount Blaine and Flinders Peak. Also located here is the Flinders Peak Conservation Park and sections of the Flinders-Goolman Conservation Estate. These parks are used for bushwalking, horse riding, mountain bike riding and camping.

Ipswich – Boonah Road (State Route 93) runs through from north to south.

== History ==
The name Peak Crossing refers to a mountain and a once important road crossing of Purga Creek.

The mountain Flinders Peak is to the east of the township, named in honour of the explorer Matthew Flinders.

The road crossing is the intersection of the Ipswich-Boonah Road and the Old Warwick Road (which connected Ipswich to the local towns Boonah and Warwick respectively), which is adjacent to Purga Creek. Today, these roads are of less importance as the Cunningham Highway (approx 8 kilometres (5.0 mi) west of Peak Crossing) carries most of the traffic to these destinations.

Purga Creek No 2 School opened on 4 September 1871. It was renamed Peak Mountain State School before 1875. In the late 1920s it was renamed Peak Crossing State School.

The Fassifern railway line (Queensland's first branch railway line) opened from Ipswich to Harrisville on 10 July 1882. Hillside railway station (27.7497°S 152.7367°E), Rocktown railway station (27.7639°S 152.7380°E) and Peak Crossing railway station (27.7789°S 152.7329°E), all on the Ipswich Boonah Road, serve the areas north of Purga Creek. Flinders railway station on Flinders Road (27.7886°S 152.7217°E) serves the area south of Purga Creek. On 12 September 1887, the line was extended from Harrisville to Dugundan. The line closed in June 1964.

Peak Crossing Post Office opened on 2 January 1886 (a receiving office had been open from 1885.

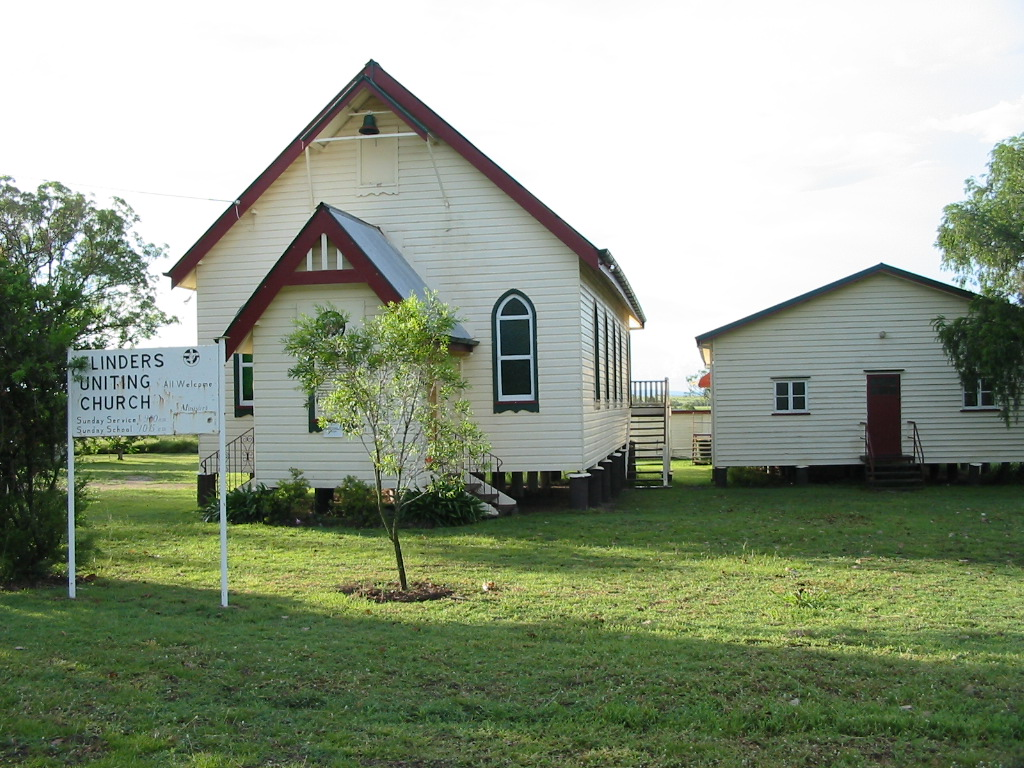
Flinders Uniting Church (formerly Congregational), 2005

In October 1872, tenders were called to construct a Congregational Church near Peak Mountain. In 1929, a new church was built by local builders Walter Florence and Charlie Meier. The former church building was sold and relocated to Rosevale to replace the Lutheran church which was burned down there in 1928. In 1977, the Congregational Church amalgamated into the Uniting Church in Australia. As at 2020, it is known as Flinders Uniting Church.

In 1882, the first Catholic church in the Boonah Parish was erected at Peak Crossing and dedicated to St Patrick. George McDonald donated 1 acre (0.40 ha) of land and the church was built by James Madden of Ipswich. The church was 40 by 25 feet (12.2 by 7.6 m) with 12-foot (3.7 m) high walls and a 15-foot (4.6 m) high roof. It had a Gothic door at the front and each of the two sides of the building had 4 Gothic windows. It was officially opened and blessed on Sunday 10 December 1882 by parish priest of Ipswich, Father Andrew Horan. It had been arranged that Bishop Robert Dunne would officiate but he did not attend on the day. The ceremony attracted a large attendance from local people as well as approximately 400 people who came from Ipswich on a train specially organised for the event. It was not possible to accommodate everyone within the church for the ceremony.

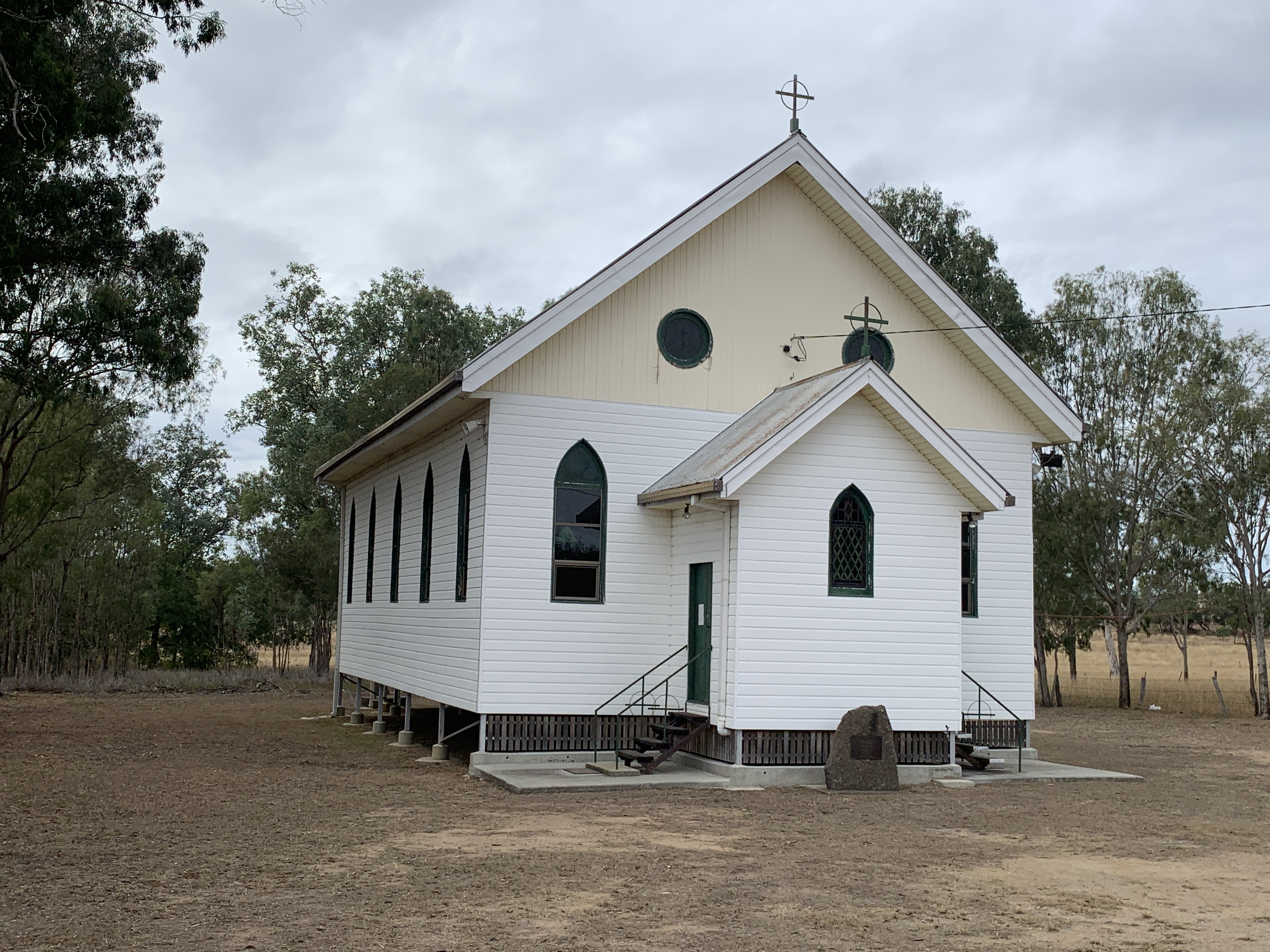
St John's Catholic Church, 2020

In November 1911, St Patrick's Catholic Church was struck by a cyclone and badly damaged. While temporary repairs were carried it, it was discovered that the timber of church had been damaged by white ants. A decision was made to build a new church and St James's Catholic Church was officially opened on 6 September 1914 by Archbishop James Duhig. As at 2020, the church is now known as St John's Catholic Church at 30 Fassifern Street (27.7835°S 152.7307°E).

On 3 November 1924, a meeting of residents was held at the school to propose the erection of a public hall. In 1925 a piece of land approx 0.75 acres (0.30 ha) was purchased from Wilhelm Althaus for £20. Mr Wyman was the architect for a fee of £6/2/9 and the builder was A. F. Schelbach for £525/5/9. The hall was officially opened on Friday 20 August 1926 by Ernest Bell, the local Member of the Queensland Legislative Assembly for Fassifern.

In early 1991 the Indian spiritual leader Prem Rawat purchased 2100 acres of land in the region and named it Amaroo. It was intended, following a planned million dollar investment, to serve as an international meeting place for his devotees. By 1992 a conference centre was being developed at Amaroo and the first "5-day event" occurred in October. International events were organised at Amaroo for his disciples, from the 1990s onward.

Amaroo also offers a commercial conference centre and camping facility for corporate, government and community group clients, known as the Ivory's Rock Convention Centre.

On Remembrance Day, 11 November 2018, the new Peak Crossing ANZAC Memorial was officially dedicated.

== Demographics ==
In the 2011 census, Peak Crossing had a population of 768.

In the 2016 census, Peak Crossing had a population of 965.

In the 2021 census, Peak Crossing had a population of 1,016.

== Heritage listings ==
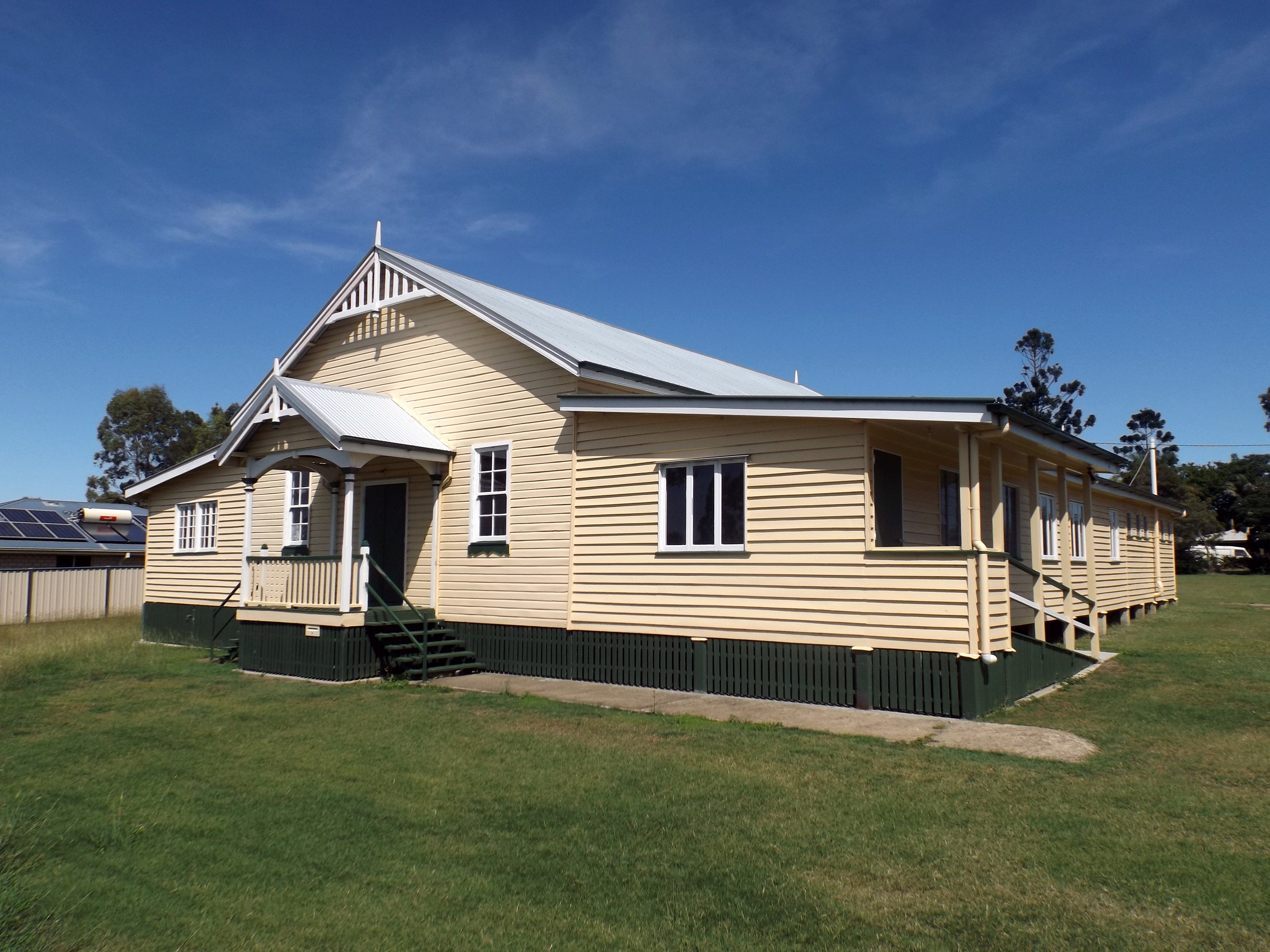
Peak Crossing Public Hall, 2015

Peak Crossing has the following heritage-listed sites:

- 33-35 Fassifern Street (27.7847°S 152.7307°E): Peak Crossing Public Hall
- 93 Flinders Street (27.7878°S 152.7221°E): Flinders Uniting Church

== Education ==
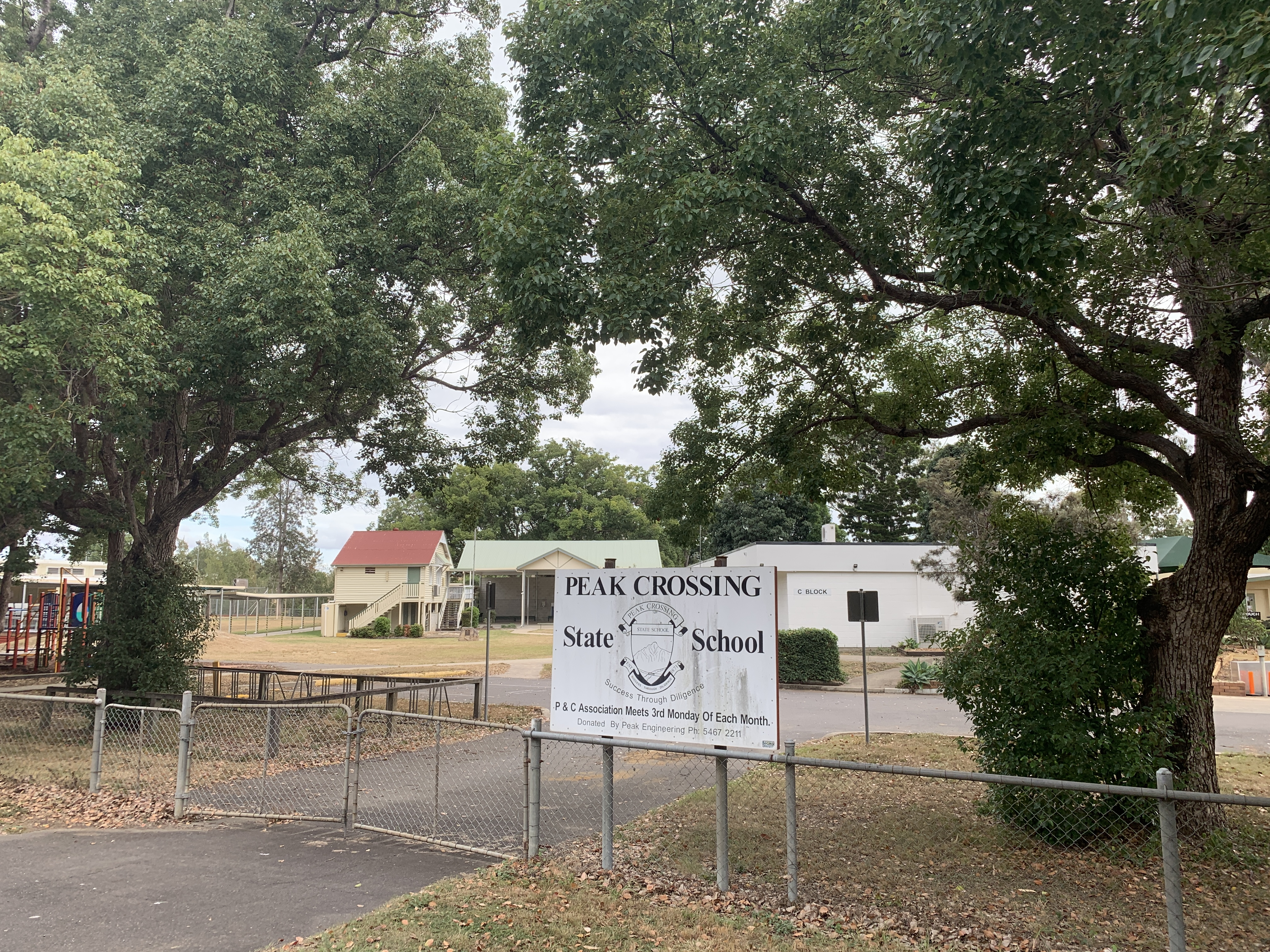
Peak Crossing State School, 2020

Peak Crossing State School is a government primary (Prep-6) school for boys and girls at 1323 Ipswich-Boonah Road (27.7798°S 152.7312°E). In 2018, the school had an enrolment of 215 students with 22 teachers (16 full-time equivalent) and 14 non-teaching staff (8 full-time equivalent).

There are no secondary schools in Peak Crossing. The nearest government secondary schools are Bremer State High School in the Ipswich CBD to the north and Flagstone State Community College in Flagstone to the east.

There are also non-government primary and secondary schools in Flagstone and in Ipswich and its suburbs.

== Amenities ==
The Peak Mountain View Park on Ipswich Boonah Road (27.7793°S 152.7324°E) is provided by the Scenic Rim Regional Council. It features open space with play equipment, electric BBQs, picnic shelters as well as public toilets and off-street car parking. The Peak Crossing ANZAC memorial is within the park.

The Scenic Rim Regional Council operates a mobile library service which visits the Peak Mountain View Park.

The Peak Crossing branch of the Queensland Country Women's Association meets in the Peak Crossing Public Hall.
