= Purga, Queensland =

Purga
- Suburb
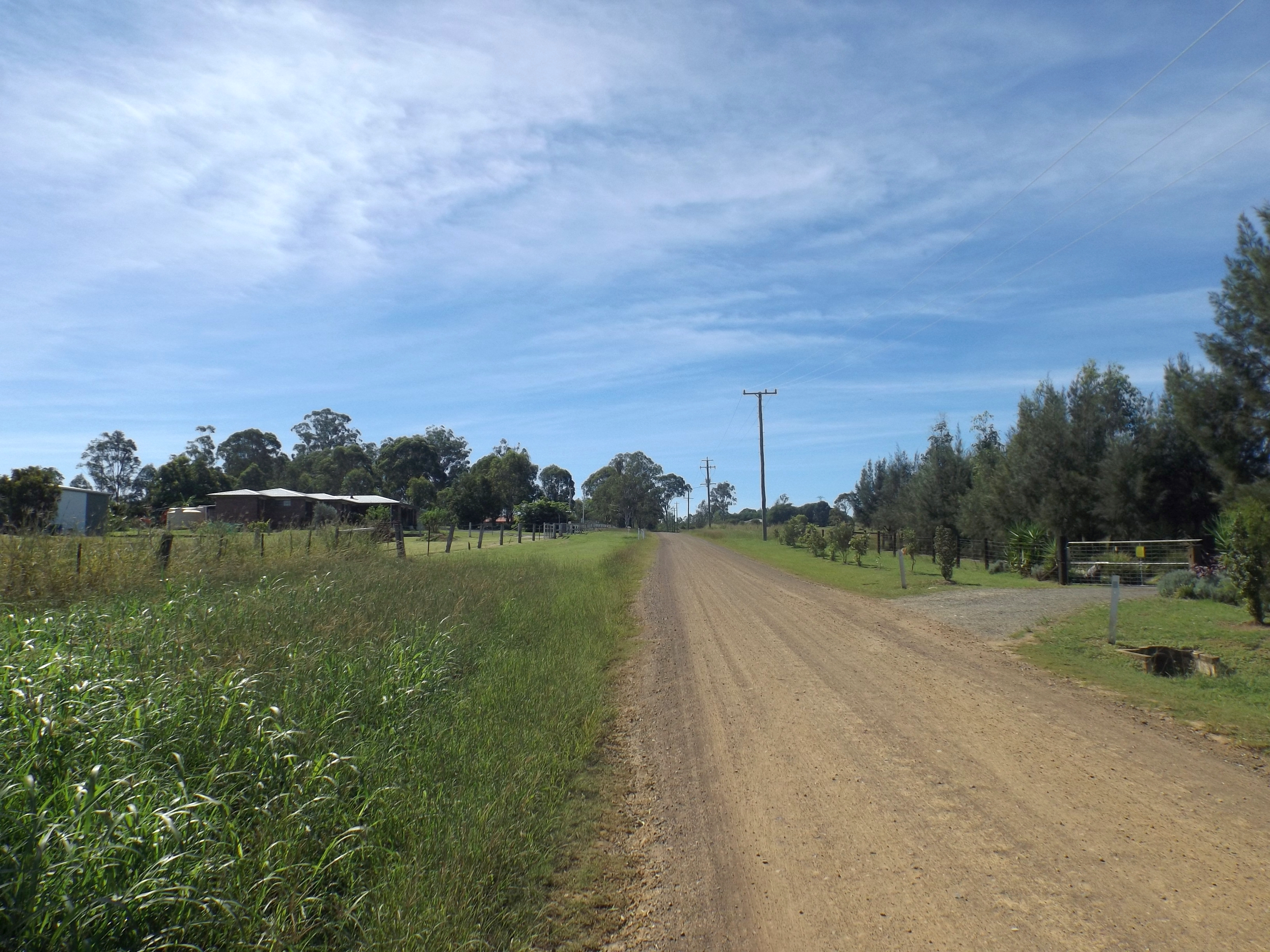
- Hughes Road, 2015

- Interactive map of Purga
- Coordinates: 27.6983°S 152.7130°E
- Country: Australia
- State: Queensland
- LGA: City of Ipswich
- Location: 12.1 km (7.5 mi) S of Ipswich CBD; 50.7 km (31.5 mi) SW of Brisbane CBD

Government
  - State electorates: Scenic Rim; Ipswich
  - Federal division: Blair

Area
  - Total: 56.6 km^{2} (21.9 sq mi)

Population
  - Total: 561 (2021 census)
  - Density: 9.912/km^{2} (25.67/sq mi)
- Time zone: UTC+10:00 (AEST)
- Postcode: 4306
Suburbs around Purga
Amberley	Amberley	Yamanto
Willowbank	Purga	Deebing Heights
Mutdapilly	Peak Crossing	Goolman

Purga is a rural locality in the City of Ipswich, Queensland, Australia. In the 2021 census, Purga had a population of 561 people.

== Geography ==
Purga is on the south-western outskirts of the urban area of Ipswich.

The western boundary of Purga follows Warrill Creek. Purga Creek enters the locality from the south (Peak Crossing) and then flows north, exiting the locality to north (Amberley / Yamanto) where it becomes a tributary of Warrill Creek.

The Cunningham Highway enters the locality from the north (Yamanto / Deebing Heights) and travels west, exiting the locality to the north-west (Willowbank / Amberley).

Ipswich – Boonah Road (State Route 93) enters the locality from the north-east (Yamanto), then runs south through the locality, before exiting to the south-east (Peak Crossing / Goolman).

The predominant land use is grazing on vegetation.

== History ==
The area was named after the parish which was derived from the Aboriginal word pur-pur, meaning a meeting place.

Purga Creek State School was opened on 1 September 1871. It was renamed Purga State School about 1945. It closed in 1967. It was at 68 Purga School Road (27.71238°S 152.73230°E).

Residents in the Fassifern Valley petitioned the Queensland Government to build a railway line to their district, and the first section of the Dugandan railway line was opened on 10 July 1882 as far as Harrisville. This is considered to be Queensland's first branch railway. Purga was served by three stations:

- Loamside railway station on the Ipswich Boonah Road (27.6711°S 152.7364°E)
- Hampstead railway station on the Ipswich Boonah Road (27.69364°S 152.73846°E)
- Purga railway station on the Ipswich Boonah Road (27.71008°S 152.73864°E)

The branch was extended to Dugandan on 12 September 1887. The line closed in 1964.

Deebing Creek Provisional School opened on 21 January 1895. In 1924, it became Purga Aboriginal State School. It closed circa 1948. It was within an Aboriginal reserve to the west of Ipswich Boonah Road (approx 27.7158°S 152.7381°E).

== Demographics ==
In the 2011 census, Purga and surrounding suburbs had a population of 600.

In the 2016 census, Purga had a population of 576 people.

In the 2021 census, Purga had a population of 561 people.

== Heritage listings ==
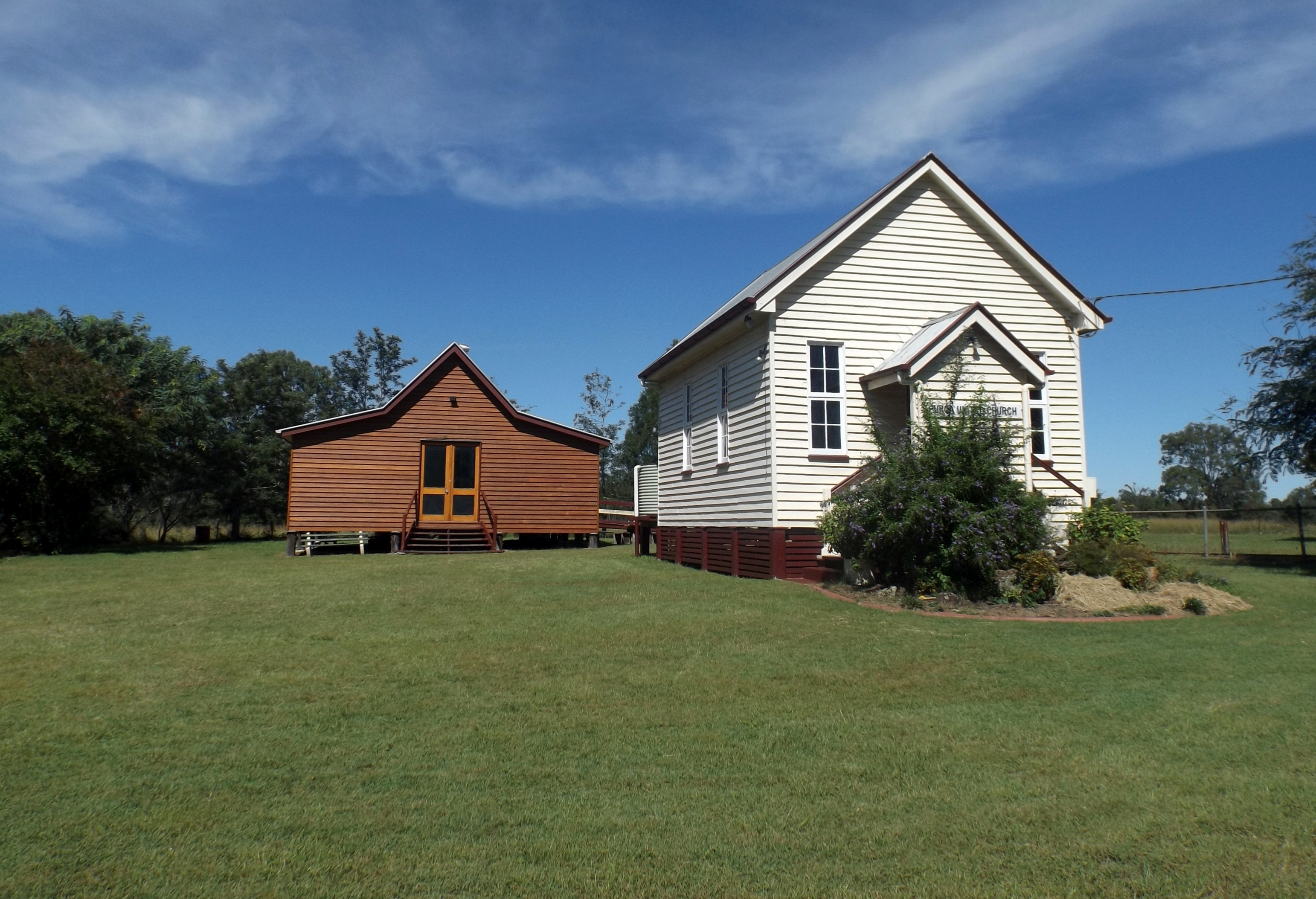
Purga United Church and hall, 2015

Purga has a number of heritage-listed sites, including:

- Purga United Church, 68 Purga School Road (27.7124°S 152.7323°E)
- Purga Aboriginal Cemetery, 133-145 Carmichaels Road (27.7198°S 152.7512°E)

== Education ==
There are no current schools in Purga. The nearest government primary schools are Amberley District State School in neighbouring Yamanto to the north-east and Peak Crossing State School in neighbouring Peak Crossing to the south. The nearest government secondary school is Bremer State High School in Ipswich CBD to the north-east.

== Facilities ==
There is a sewage treatment plant at 2540-2576 Cunningham Highway (27.6595°S 152.7016°E).
