= Flinders View, Queensland =

Flinders View Ipswich, Queensland
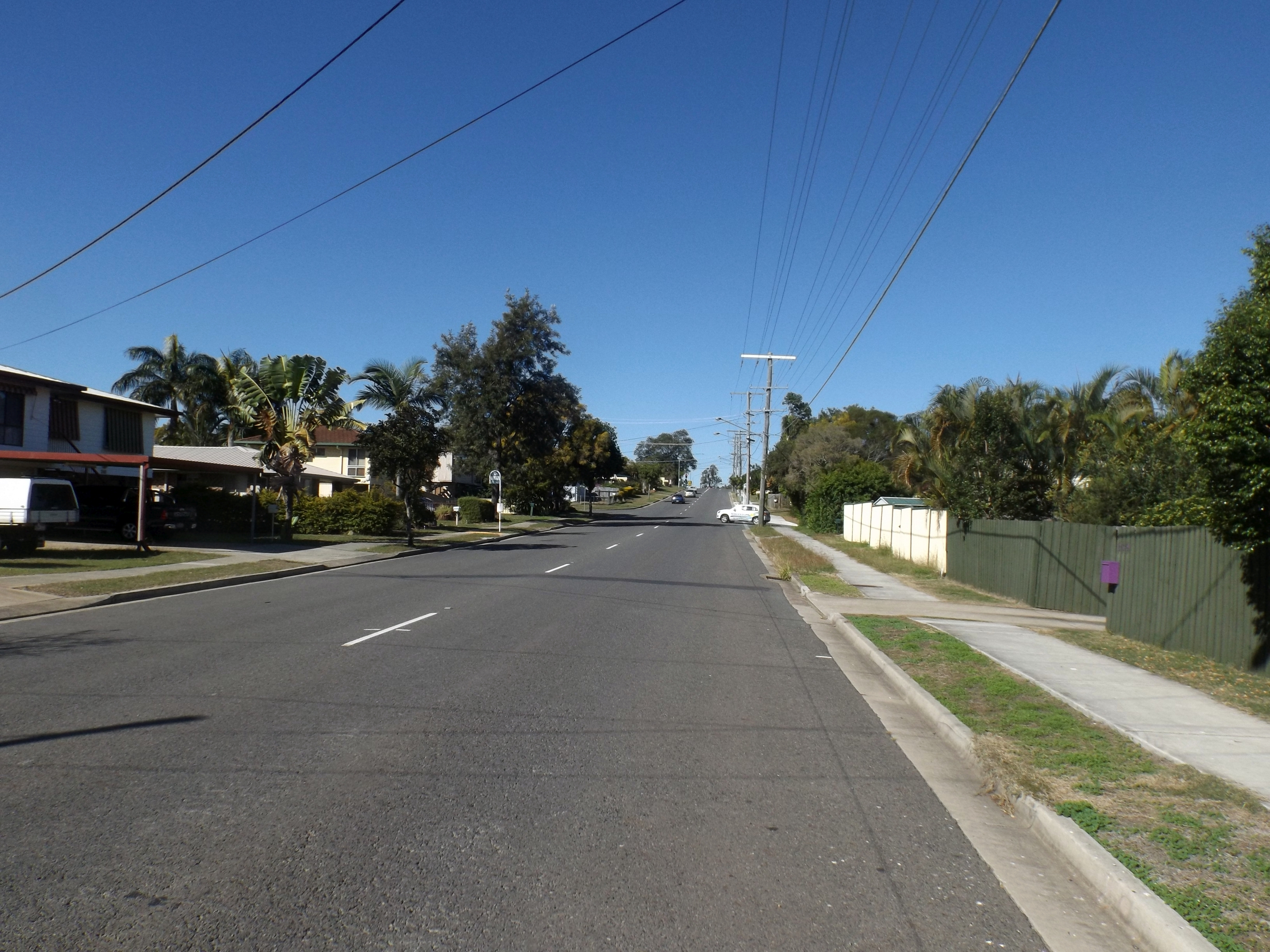
- Ripley Road, 2016

- Coordinates: 27.6516°S 152.7794°E
- Population: 5,816 (2021 census)
  - Density: 1,077/km^{2} (2,790/sq mi)
- Postcode(s): 4305
- Area: 5.4 km^{2} (2.1 sq mi)
- Time zone: AEST (UTC+10:00)
- Location: 5.9 km (4 mi) S of Ipswich CBD; 41.2 km (26 mi) SW of Brisbane CBD
- LGA(s): City of Ipswich
- State electorate(s): Ipswich
- Federal division(s): Blair
Suburbs around Flinders View:
Churchill	Raceview	Swanbank
Yamanto	Flinders View	Swanbank
Deebing Heights	Ripley	South Ripley

Flinders View is a suburb of Ipswich in the City of Ipswich, Queensland, Australia. In the 2021 census, Flinders View had a population of 5,816 people.

== Geography ==
Flinders View is bisected by the Cunningham Highway which also forms part of the northern and southern boundary of the suburb.

Flinders View consists of four estates, Fairview Rise, Kensington Hills, Jacana Place and Flinders Crest. Major parks include Fairview Park and Nugent Park.

== History ==
The origin of the suburb name is from the view and proximity to Flinders Peak from the suburb of Flinders View.

== Demographics ==
In the 2016 census, Flinders View had a population of 5,808 people.

In the 2021 census, Flinders View had a population of 5,816 people.

== Education ==
There are no schools in Flinders View. The nearest government schools are Raceview State School in neighbouring Raceview to the north and Amberley District State School in neighbouring Yamanto to the west. The nearest government secondary school is Bremer State High School in the Ipswich CBD to the north-west.

== Amenities ==
The Ipswich City Council operates a fortnightly mobile library service which visits the Winston Glades shopping centre.
