= Lyons, Queensland =

Lyons
- Suburb
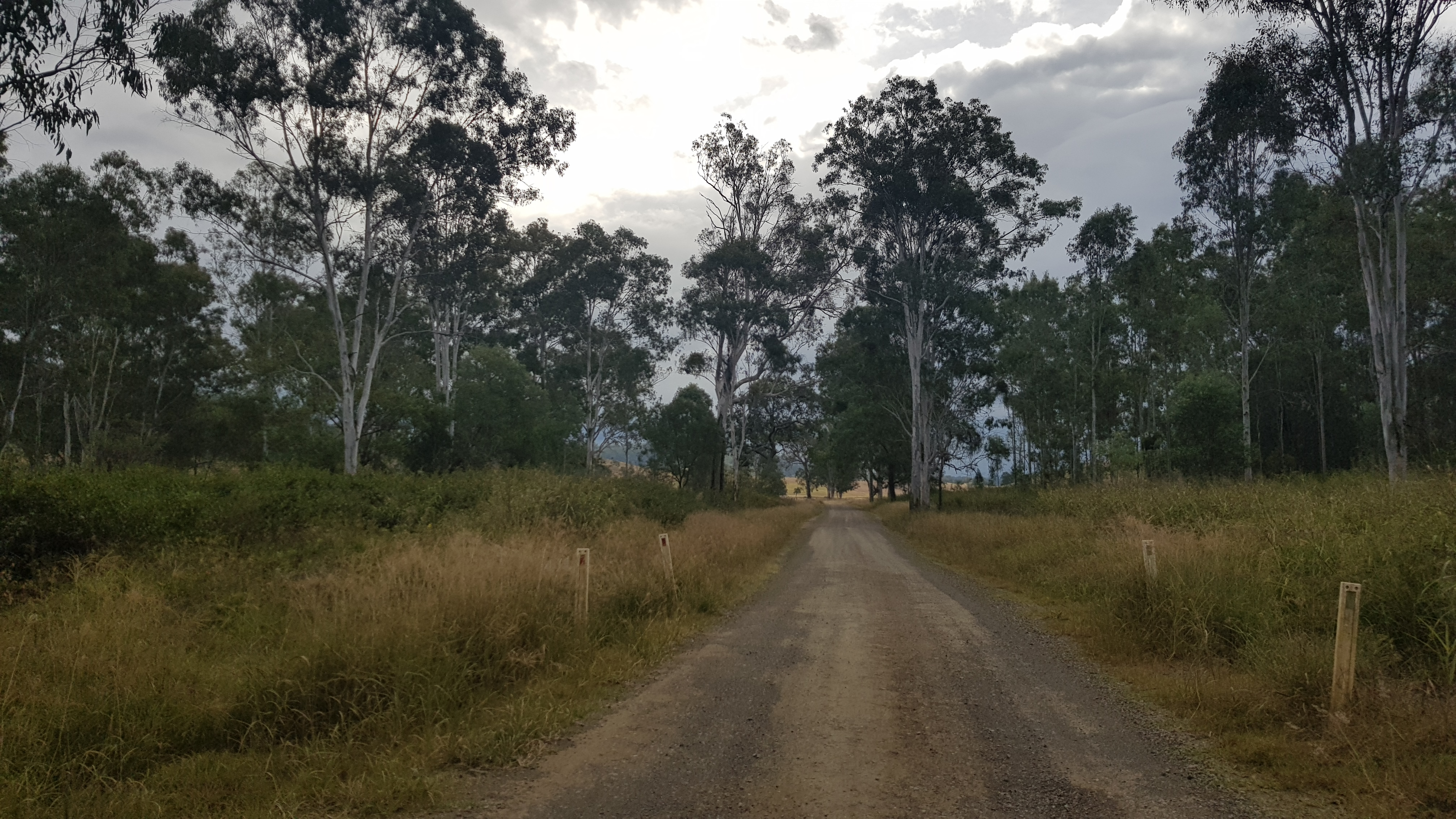
- Ripley Road, 2023

- Interactive map of Lyons
- Coordinates: 27.7713°S 152.8636°E
- Country: Australia
- State: Queensland
- City: Logan City
- LGA: Logan City
- Location: 11.8 km (7.3 mi) S of South Ripley; 21.9 km (13.6 mi) SSE of Ipswich CBD; 51.3 km (31.9 mi) WSW of Park Ridge; 52.2 km (32.4 mi) WSW of Logan Central; 53.1 km (33.0 mi) SSW of Brisbane CBD

Government
  - State electorate: Jordan
  - Federal division: Wright

Area
  - Total: 44.2 km^{2} (17.1 sq mi)

Population
  - Total: 39 (2021 census)
  - Density: 0.882/km^{2} (2.29/sq mi)
- Time zone: UTC+10:00 (AEST)
- Postcode: 4124
Suburbs around Lyons
South Ripley	Greenbank	New Beith
Peak Crossing	Lyons	Silverbark Ridge
Peak Crossing	Undullah	Monarch Glen

Lyons is a rural locality in the City of Logan, Queensland, Australia. In the 2021 census, Lyons had a population of 39 people.

== Geography ==
Mount Perry Conservation Park is in the north-west of the locality.

The locality is mostly undeveloped and is used for grazing on native vegetation.

== History ==
The name Lyons comes from the settler William Lyons who lived in the area in the 1880s. The locality was named and bounded on 24 April 1997. It was formerly in the Shire of Beaudesert, however it became part of Logan City following the local government amalgamations in March 2008.

== Demographics ==
In the 2016 census, Lyons had a population of 32 people, 41.7% female and 58.3% male. The median age of the Lyons population was 48 years, 10 years above the national median of 38.

In the 2021 census, Lyons had a population of 39 people, 50.0% female and 50.0% male. The median age of the Lyons population was 47 years, 9 years above the national median of 3.8.

== Education ==
There are no schools in Lyons. The nearest government primary schools are Ripley Valley State School in neighbouring South Ripley to the north-west, Greenbank State School in neighbouring Greenbank to the north-east, and Peak Crossing State School in neighbouring Peak Crossing to the south-west. The nearest government secondary schools are Ripley Valley State Secondary College in neighbouring South Ripley to the north-west, Bremer State High School in Ipswich CBD to the north-west, and Park Ridge State High School in Park Ridge to the north-east.
