= Deebing Heights, Queensland =

Deebing Heights
- Suburb
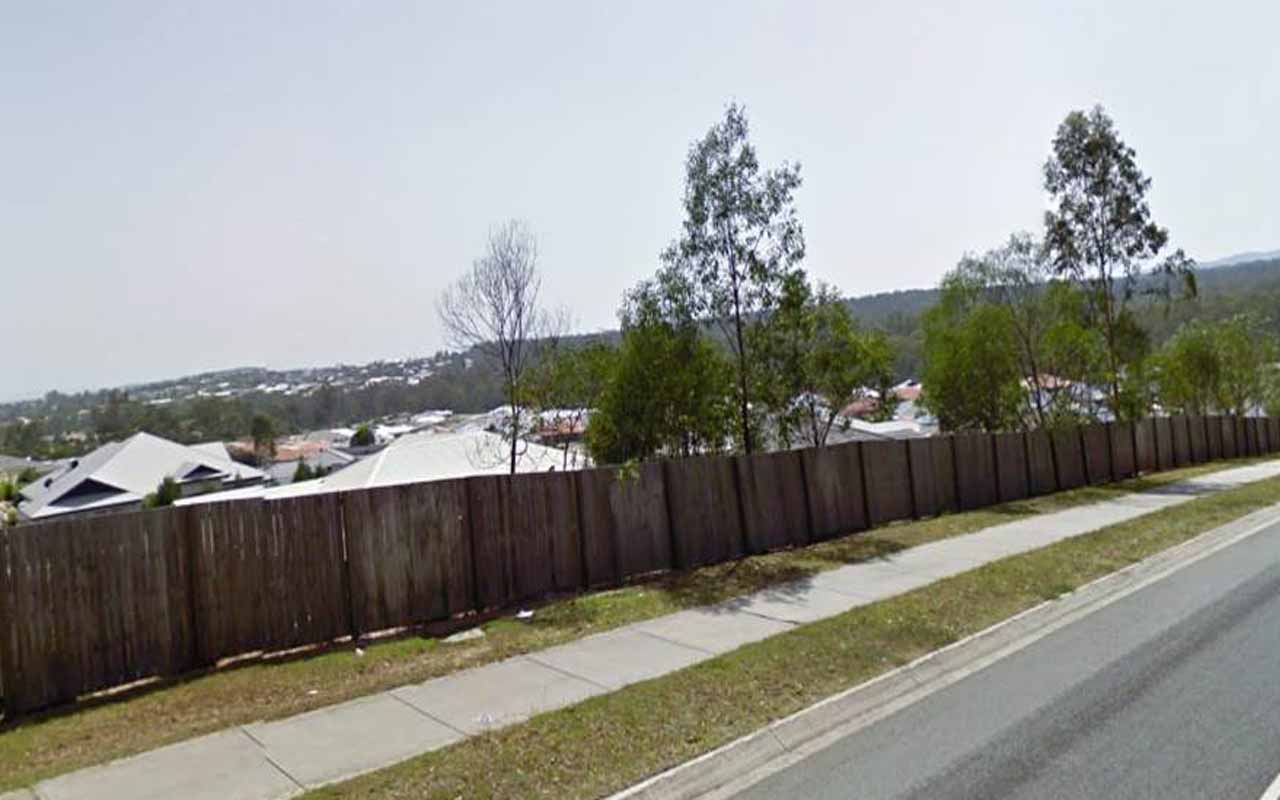
- Residential development in Deebing Heights

- Interactive map of Deebing Heights
- Coordinates: 27.6875°S 152.7613°E
- Country: Australia
- State: Queensland
- City: Ipswich
- LGA: City of Ipswich
- Location: 9 km (5.6 mi) S of Ipswich CBD; 46 km (29 mi) SW of Brisbane CBD
- Established: 8 September 2000

Government
  - State electorate: Ipswich
  - Federal division: Blair

Area
  - Total: 10.5 km^{2} (4.1 sq mi)

Population
  - Total: 3,960 (2021 census)
  - Density: 377.1/km^{2} (977/sq mi)
- Time zone: UTC+10:00 (AEST)
- Postcode: 4306
Suburbs around Deebing Heights
Yamanto	Flinders View	Ripley
Purga	Deebing Heights	South Ripley
Purga	Goolman	Goolman

Deebing Heights is a residential and semi-rural southern suburb of Ipswich in the City of Ipswich, Queensland, Australia. In the 2021 census, Deebing Heights had a population of 3,960 people.

== Geography ==
Deebing Heights is a large suburb encompassing the area from the eponymous hills surrounding Deebing Creek in the north of the suburb through to the lower foothills of the Flinders Peak Group in the south. From the Grampian Hills it is possible, on a clear day, to see the Brisbane skyline and the Pacific Ocean.

== History ==
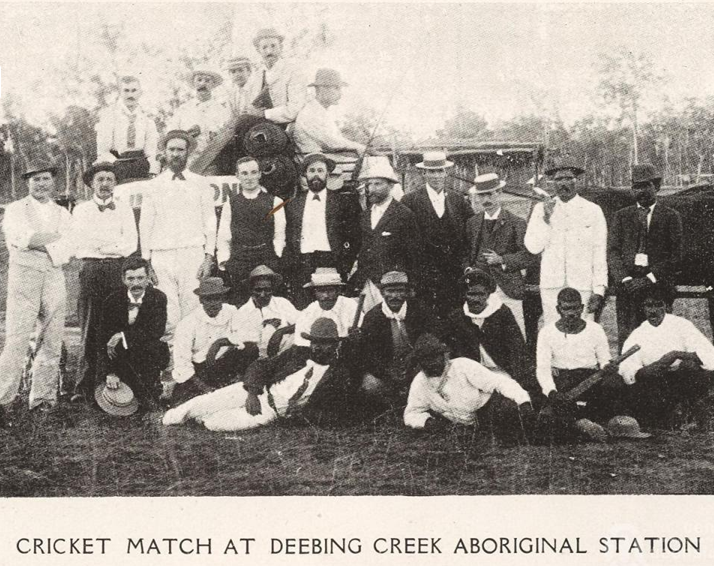
Cricket match at Deebing Heights in 1910

The suburb takes its name from the Deebing Creek, which in turn is a Ugarapul word dibing meaning mosquito or other small winged insect.

The Deebing Creek Mission Aboriginal Reserve was founded by the Aboriginal Protection Society of Ipswich on 130 acres at the southern end of Grampian Drive in 1887. On 2 January 1892, construction was completed and the reserve was officially proclaimed.

Missionary Edward Fuller was the first manager of Deebing Creek which initially catered for Aboriginal people from the Ipswich area. By the turn of the century the mission superintendent reported that the inmates of Deebing Creek came from many different tribes with some children being sent to the mission from as far away as Burketown. Government records show that the mission was supplied with provisions by the Department from February 1891 to February 1894. In March 1894 to June 1896 a grant of £250 per annum was authorised.

In November 1896 the Rev. Peter Robertson, chairman of the Aboriginal Protection Association, requested and was granted additional funding for building and the purchase of more land and the annual grant to the mission was increased to £450. At the same time a gazettal notice made provision under the Industrial and Reformatory Schools Act of 1865 for the establishment of an industrial school which came to be known as the Deebing Creek Industrial School. The industrial school at Myora was closed and some of the children were transferred to Deebing Creek Industrial School.

In November 1914 a grant of £200 was made to assist in the transfer of the mission from Deebing Creek to reserve land at Purga. The reasons for the move were the abundance of good agricultural land and the greater distance from the town centre. The mission committee was still acquiring property and land for the mission, with the Chief Protector noting in a Departmental letter that 62 acres of farm land adjoining the Purga site had been purchased for £600 by the committee. In 1915 the mission was relocated to Purga.

From the closing of the reserve, the suburb remained largely undeveloped until the 1990s when Winland Developments commenced construction on a new premium acreage estate named 'Paradise Heights' in the southern Grampian Hills on the lower foothills of the Flinders Peak Group. In the next decade, work began on a smaller allotment development in the north between the Cunningham Highway and Deebing Creek.

At the beginning of the 2000s, Deebing Heights was identified as being an important growth corridor within the planned Ripley Valley, a masterplanned city that will one day be the size of Cairns. In 2007, the Urban Land Development Authority Act 2007 (Qld) was passed taking planning powers for most of Deebing Heights away from local government and giving it to the State Government. The Urban Land Development Authority is now responsible for all development in the Ripley Valley.

The area that is now Deebing Heights has been an important settlement since Queensland's early colonial history, but was only gazetted as a locality in 2000 and then a suburb in 2004, previously being part of Purga. It is home to the heritage listed Deebing Creek Mission, an Aboriginal reserve located at the southern end of Grampian Drive, which acted as a home to the Ugarapul/Yuggera tribe until its closing in 1915.

On 8 September 2002, Deebing Heights was named and bounded as a locality. On 2 July 2004, it was redesignated a suburb.

In 2003, the Western Transport Corridor was planned to be built from Springfield to Yamanto via White Rock, Ripley and Deebing Heights. In 2009, construction was completed and Deebing Heights residents are now only minutes from Springfield and travel time to Brisbane and Gold Coast is also considerably shorter.

Deebing Heights State School opened on 1 January 2016.

Development was slow to begin in Deebing Heights with Paradise Heights, a premium acreage estate only beginning development in the mid-1990s.

== Demographics ==
In the 2016 census, Deebing Heights had a population of 2,039 people. ar

In the 2021 census, Deebing Heights had a population of 3,960 people. 52.1% of the population are female and the median age is 29. There are 1,088 families per the 2021 census.

== Heritage sites ==
Deebing Heights has a number of heritage-listed sites, including:

- South Deebing Creek Road: former Deebing Creek Mission

== Housing ==
The acreage lots in the southern Grampian Hills give space for quite large and generous houses. However, subsequent developments in Deebing Heights, particularly in the north, have seen block allotments shrink in size and can only accommodate houses of a modest size.

== Education ==
Deebing Heights State School is a government primary (Prep-6) school for boys and girls at 81 Rawlings Road (27.6733°S 152.75°E). In 2017, the school had an enrolment of 200 students with 15 teachers (13 full-time equivalent) and 8 non-teaching staff (6 full-time equivalent).

There is no secondary school in Deebing Heights; the nearest is Bremer State High School in Ipswich CBD.
