= Yamanto, Queensland =

Suburb of Ipswich, Queensland, Australia

Yamanto
- Suburb
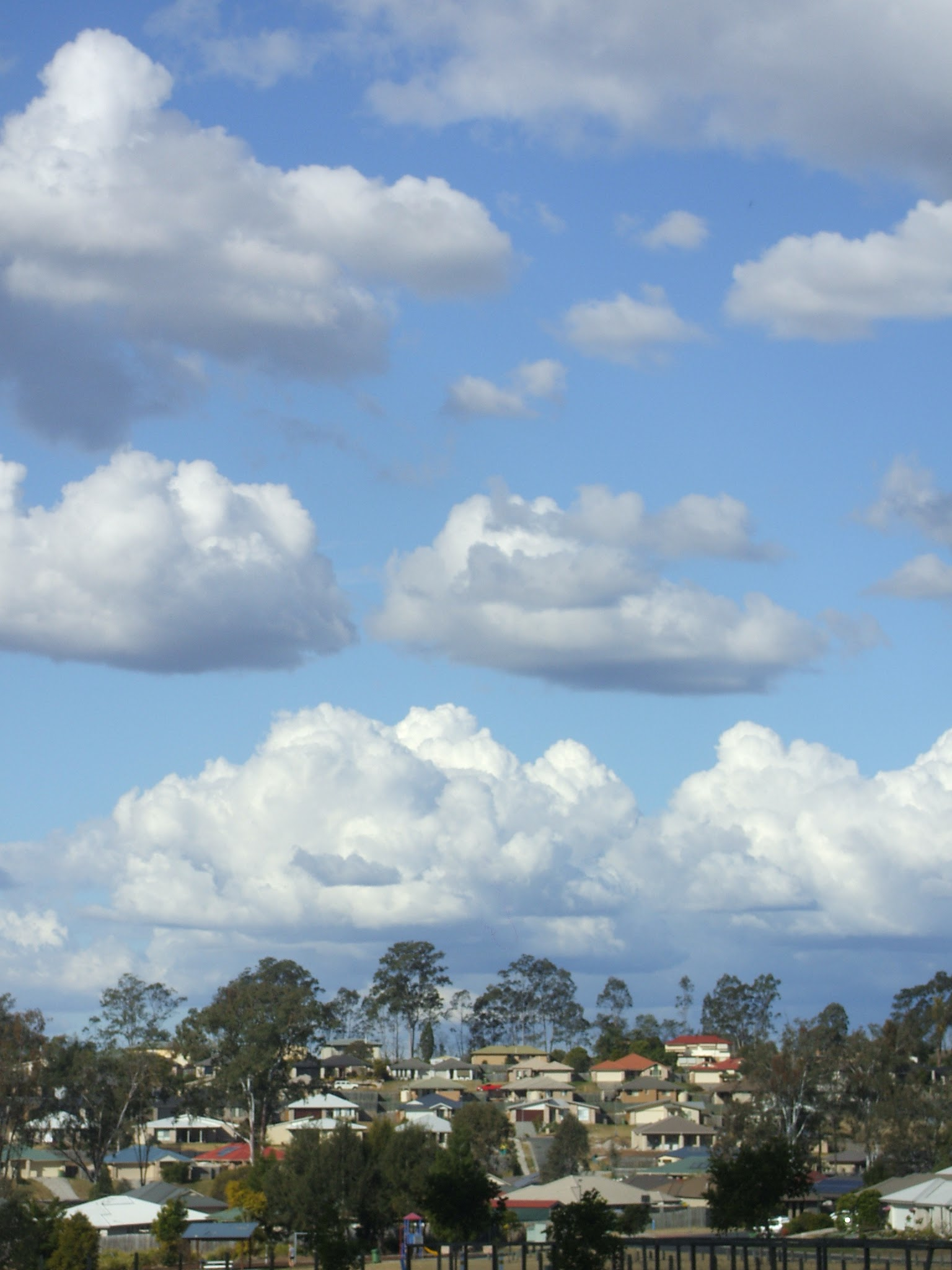
- View from the east of Yamanto looking west

- Coordinates: 27.6497°S 152.7402°E
- Country: Australia
- State: Queensland
- City: Ipswich
- LGA: City of Ipswich
- Location: 5 km (3.1 mi) SW of Ipswich CBD; 47 km (29 mi) SW of Brisbane CBD

Government
  - State electorate: Ipswich West
  - Federal division: Blair

Area
  - Total: 8.5 km^{2} (3.3 sq mi)

Population
  - Total: 4,971 (2021 census)
  - Density: 585/km^{2} (1,515/sq mi)
- Postcode: 4305
Suburbs around Yamanto
Amberley	One Mile	Churchill
Purga	Yamanto	Flinders View
Purga	Deebing Heights	Ripley

Yamanto is a suburb of Ipswich in the City of Ipswich, Queensland, Australia. In the 2021 census, Yamanto had a population of 4,971 people.

== History ==
The origin of the suburb is from a former 50 acres (20 ha) 1860s cotton plantation which was originally spelt as 'Yamahanto', the property jointly owned by Queensland's first government medical officer Henry Challinor (1814–1882) and his cousin George Miles Challinor (1832–1888). Previous names used for this area were Mine Accident, Loamside and Yahmahnto. The names were given to the railway station in the Yamanto area on the now-defunct Dugandan railway line.

Since 1847, Darby McGrath had operated private schools in and around Ipswich. In 1861, he arranged for the Queensland Government to take over his school at Warrill Creek and provided land in Green Lane for a new school building. Warrill Creek State School opened on 22 May 1862. In 1888, the school moved to a new location at Sandridge, which was flooded in 1893. In 1903, the school was renamed Amberley State School. During World War II, the school was too close to the Amberley air force base and was closed in 1942, re-opening in 1947. In the late 1970s, the school was relocated to Rosewood Road further from the air base due to concerns about aircraft noise with a new school building opened in 1982. Due to expansion of the air base, the school was relocated to Yamanto and opened in 2010 under the new name of Amberley District State School.

In 2015, this suburb saw a growth corridor being developed in the adjacent Ripley Valley called Ecco Ripley. In conjunction with the expansion of the nearby RAAF Base Amberley the suburb experienced an influx of businesses as well as redevelopment of existing businesses.

== Demographics ==
In the 2016 census, Yamanto had a population of 4,906 people.

In the 2021 census, Yamanto had a population of 4,971 people.

== Education ==
Amberley District State School is a government primary (P-6) school for boys and girls at 37 Deebing Creek Road (27.65749°S 152.75013°E). In 2017, the school had an enrolment of 807 students with 57 teachers (52 full-time equivalent) and 40 non-teaching staff (25 full-time equivalent). Being on the south-eastern fringe of the Ipswich metropolitan area, the school has students from both the suburbs and the rural area. Approximately one quarter of the students have a parent in the defence forces, many serving at the air base; these children may have lived in many other places due to their parents' deployments.

There are no secondary schools in Yamanto. The nearest government secondary school is Bremer State High School in Ipswich CBD to the north-east.
