= Churchill, Queensland =

Churchill
- Suburb
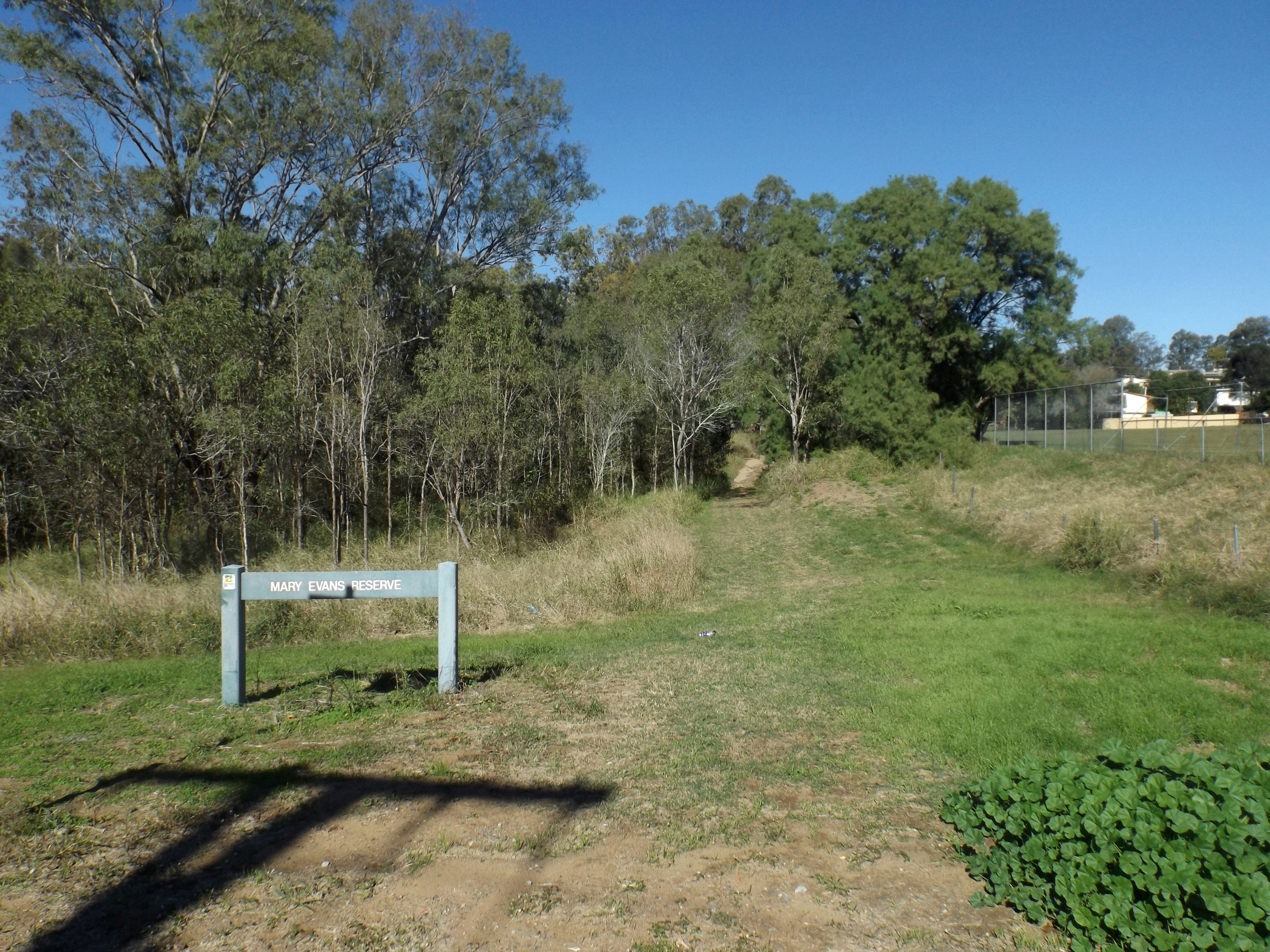
- Mary Evans Reserve, 2016

- Interactive map of Churchill
- Coordinates: 27.6355°S 152.7513°E
- Country: Australia
- State: Queensland
- City: Ipswich
- LGA: City of Ipswich
- Location: 42 km (26 mi) from Brisbane; 4.5 km (2.8 mi) from Ipswich

Government
  - State electorate: Ipswich
  - Federal division: Blair

Area
  - Total: 1.7 km^{2} (0.66 sq mi)

Population
  - Total: 1,842 (2021 census)
  - Density: 1,080/km^{2} (2,810/sq mi)
- Time zone: UTC+10:00 (AEST)
- Postcode: 4305
Suburbs around Churchill
Leichhardt	West Ipswich	Ipswich
One Mile	Churchill	Raceview
Yamanto	Yamanto	Flinders View

Churchill is a suburb of Ipswich in the City of Ipswich, Queensland, Australia. In the 2021 census, Churchill had a population of 1,842 people.

== Geography ==
The western boundary is marked by the Bremer River, while the eastern boundary follows Deebing Creek.

== History ==
Residents in the Fassifern Valley petitioned the Queensland Government to build a railway line to their district, and the first section of the Dugandan railway line was opened on 10 July 1882 as far as Harrisville. This is considered to be Queensland's first branch railway. Churchill was served by the Churchill railway station at Lobb Street (27.6356°S 152.7486°E). The branch was extended to Dugandan on 12 September 1887. The line from Churchill to Dugandan closed in 1964 with the remaining line being known as the Churchill branch railway.

In 1913 a Baptist Church opened in Churchill. A stump-capping ceremony was held on Saturday 28 March 1913. On Saturday 9 August 1913, volunteers erected the church in four-and-a-quarter hours using the rapid building technique (with prefabricated parts). The work commenced at 2 p.m. and was finished at 6:15 p.m. for the official opening.

Churchill State School opened on 29 January 1923.

== Demographics ==
In the 2016 census, Churchill had a population of 1,860 people.

In the 2021 census, Churchill had a population of 1,842 people.

== Education ==
Churchill State School is a government primary (Prep-6) school for boys and girls on Warwick Road (27.6426°S 152.7506°E). In 2017, the school had an enrolment of 376 students with 29 teachers (24 full-time equivalent) and 22 support staff (14 full-time equivalent). It includes a special education program.

There are no secondary schools in Churchill. The nearest secondary school is Bremer State High School in the neighbouring suburb of Ipswich.
