= One Mile, Queensland =

One Mile
- Suburb
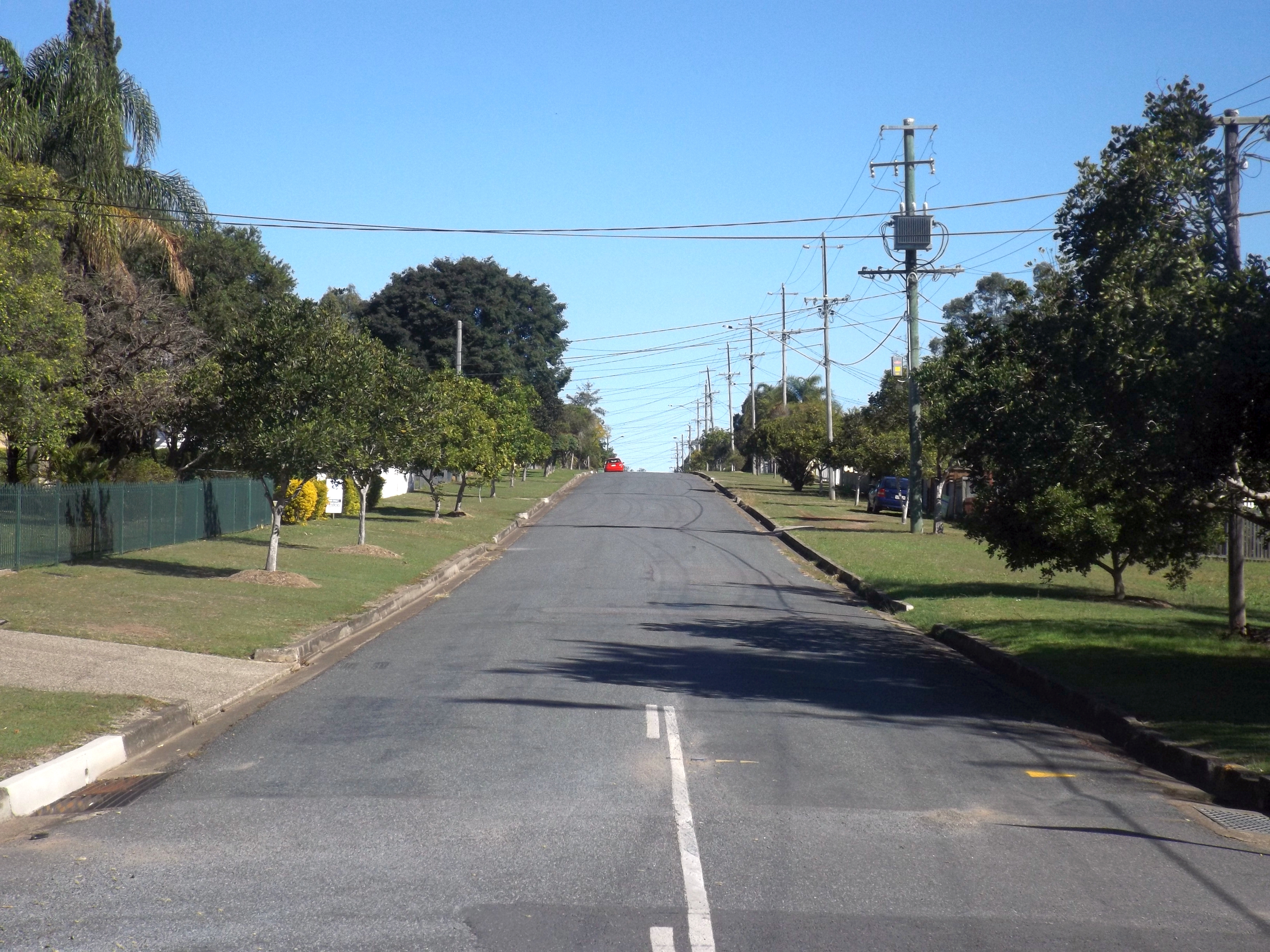
- Philip Street, 2016

- Coordinates: 27.6347°S 152.7380°E
- Country: Australia
- State: Queensland
- City: Ipswich
- LGA: City of Ipswich
- Location: 3.4 km (2.1 mi) SW of Ipswich; 47.0 km (29.2 mi) SW of Brisbane CBD

Government
  - State electorate: Ipswich West
  - Federal division: Blair

Area
  - Total: 1.9 km^{2} (0.73 sq mi)

Population
  - Total: 2,038 (2021 census)
  - Density: 1,073/km^{2} (2,780/sq mi)
- Time zone: UTC+10:00 (AEST)
- Postcode: 4305
Suburbs around One Mile
Leichhardt	Leichhardt	West Ipswich
Amberley	One Mile	Churchill
Yamanto	Yamanto	Churchill

One Mile is a suburb of Ipswich in the City of Ipswich, Queensland, Australia. In the 2021 census, One Mile had a population of 2,038 people.

== History ==
The origin of the suburb name is from its approximate distance from the Ipswich CBD. It was one mile from the centre of Ipswich to the crossing of the Bremer River on the road to Toowoomba (now the Old Toowoomba Road). The bridge at this crossing was known as the One Mile Bridge until it was renamed the Don Livingstone One Mile Bridge in 2015 after Don Livingstone, a former Member of the Queensland Legislative Assembly for the local area.

Leichhardt Methodist Church was officially opened on Saturday 5 September 1953 by Reverend John Egerton Jacob. The church building was not new but the relocated Methodist Church from Birkwood (now within Coleyville / Warrill View) which opened 77 years earlier in 1876 but the congregation had subsequently declined. With the amalgamation of the Methodist Church into the Uniting Church in Australia in 1977, it became Leichhardt Uniting Church. It was demolished in 2018. It was at 13 Chubb Street (27.6305°S 152.7384°E), now within the suburb boundaries of One Mile.

Immaculate Heart of Mary Catholic Church opened in 1958 at 22 Old Toowoomba Road. Immaculate Heart of Mary Catholic Primary School opened on 23 January 1967 adjacent to the church. It was the first Catholic school in the Archdiocese of Brisbane to be opened without full-time religious staff as none of the teaching orders of Catholic nuns was able to provide staff. It was opened with two lay women teachers, Mrs Frances Elmore and Mrs Ellen Payne, with nursing sisters from the Sisters of Perpetual Adoration at Villa Maria Nursing Home in Ipswich attending part-time to provide religious instruction. In 1982 the new brick Immaculate Heart of Mary Catholic church was built and the old church was re-purposed for school classrooms.

== Demographics ==
In the 2016 census, One Mile had a population of 2,077 people. At that time, One Mile had an unemployment rate of 12.2%, nearly double that of the Australian unemployment rate of 6.9%.

In the 2021 census, One Mile had a population of 2,038 people.

== Education ==
Immaculate Heart Catholic Primary School is a Catholic primary (Prep–6) school for boys and girls at 22 Old Toowoomba Road (27.6287°S 152.7386°E). In 2018, the school had an enrolment of 186 students with 16 teachers (14 full-time equivalent) and 10 non-teaching staff (6 full-time equivalent).

== Amenities ==
Immaculate Heart of Mary Catholic Church is at 22 Old Toowoomba Road (27.6291°S 152.7385°E).
