= Ecco Ripley =

- Country: Australia
- State: Queensland
- Region: South East Queensland
- LGA: City of Ipswich
- Established: 2012
- Time zone: UTC+10:00 (AEST)

Ecco Ripley is a master-planned community in the City of Ipswich, Queensland, Australia. It will be Queensland's biggest housing development and Australia's largest-ever master planned community. The site lies in the northern foothills of the Flinders Peak Group in the Bundamba Creek water catchment about five kilometres south of the centre of Ipswich. It includes development of the existing suburbs of Deebing Heights and rural Ripley. The Green Building Council of Australia rated the Ecco Ripley development with a Green Star, a first in Queensland.

== Planning ==
In 2010, it was announced that Ripley Valley, Yarrabilba and Greater Flagstone near Jimboomba would be developed as greenfield investments in response to the region's population growth which was expected to reach 4.4 million by 2031. The site had been earmarked for development within the South East Queensland Regional Plan which was released on 28 July 2009. The Ipswich City Council worked for a number of years to generate a Ripley Valley Structure Plan.

The satellite city is planned to accommodate 120,000 people in 50,000 homes in the rapidly developing western growth corridor of South East Queensland. Ecco Ripley is the third master planned community in the western corridor, after Forest Lake and Springfield. Major transport connections include the existing Centenary Highway and an expected extension to the Springfield railway line.

The urban core of Ecco Ripley, called the Town Centre, will consist of numerous civic and commercial buildings in a central hub of 194 hectares and is being developed by Japanese home building company Sekisui House. Included in their plans is the creation of 4,000 homes for more than 10,000 people over 15 years. Sekisui became involved with the project after it purchased land in the Ripley Valley from Babcock & Brown, a Sydney-based global investment and advisory firm which went into administration in 2009.

== Development ==
Groundbreaking work was begun by Ipswich mayor Paul Pisasale and Sekisui House in late October 2012. The first residents are expected to occupy homes in 2014 with full development of the project by 2057. Stage 1 of the project involves upgrades to Ripley Road, 46 residential lots, parks and a sales and information centre.

Infrastructure planning such as sewage and mains water supply has been coordinated by the Urban Land Development Authority, a state government agency and the Ipswich City Council. The council allocated $19 million to spending on road, water and sewerage infrastructure in the 2013/14 financial year.
