= South Ripley, Queensland =

South Ripley
- Suburb
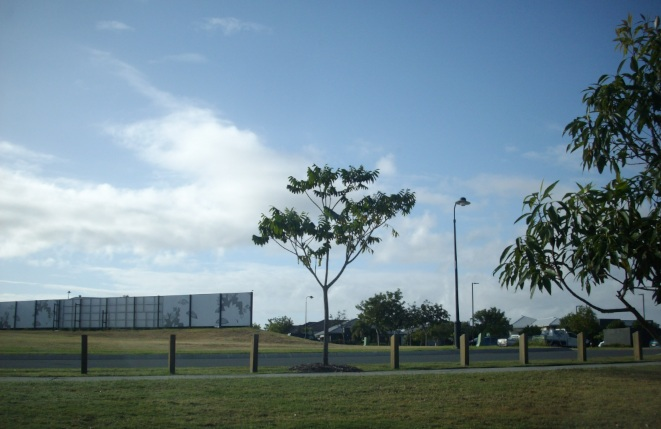
- Harmony Crescent, South Ripley

- Interactive map of South Ripley
- Coordinates: 27.7216°S 152.8238°E
- Country: Australia
- State: Queensland
- City: Ipswich
- LGA: City of Ipswich
- Location: 11.8 km (7.3 mi) SSE of Ipswich CBD; 45.0 km (28.0 mi) SW of Brisbane CBD

Government
  - State electorates: Ipswich; Bundamba
  - Federal division: Blair

Area
  - Total: 50.5 km^{2} (19.5 sq mi)

Population
  - Total: 4,069 (2021 census)
  - Density: 80.57/km^{2} (208.69/sq mi)
- Time zone: UTC+10:00 (AEST)
- Postcode: 4306
Suburbs around South Ripley
Deebing Heights; Ripley	Swanbank	White Rock
Goolman	South Ripley	Spring Mountain
Peak Crossing	Lyons	Greenbank

South Ripley is a rural locality and suburb of Ipswich in the City of Ipswich, Queensland, Australia. South Ripley is part of the Ecco Ripley urban development area. In the 2021 census, South Ripley had a population of 4,069 people.

== Geography ==
As a locality, South Ripley is the valley created by Bundamba Creek, which runs in a north-south direction in the locality. Bundamba Lagoon is located in the south-east part of the locality.

== History ==
South Ripley is situated in the Yugarabul traditional Indigenous Australian country of the Brisbane and surrounding regions.

Bundamba Upper State School opened on 2 February 1874. In 1909, it was renamed Ripley State School. It closed in 1930 due to low student numbers. It was at 1166-1176 Ripley Road (27.7211°S 152.8174°E).

Ripley Valley State School and Ripley Valley State Secondary College opened on 1 January 2020.

== Demographics ==
In the 2011 census, South Ripley had a population of 344 people.

In the 2016 census, South Ripley had a population of 712 people.

In the 2021 census, South Ripley had a population of 4,069 people.

== Amenities ==
The Ipswich City Council operates a fortnightly mobile library service which visits Providence Parade.

Stockland Providence shopping mall, 294 Providence Parade, South Ripley.

== Education ==
Ripley Valley State School is a government primary (P-6) school for boys and girls at 110 Botany Drive (27.6956°S 152.8131°E). In 2020, its first year of operation, the school had an enrolment of 336 students with 26 teachers (24 full-time equivalent) and 20 non-teaching staff (13 full-time equivalent).

Ripley Valley State Secondary College is a government secondary (7-12) school for boys and girls on the corner of Providence Parade and Parkway Avenue (27.6942°S 152.8103°E). In 2020, its first year of operation, the school had an enrolment of 154 students in Years 7 and 8 (the only years of school initially offered) with 15 teachers and 16 non-teaching staff (13 full-time equivalent).
