= Amberley, Queensland =

Amberley Ipswich, Queensland
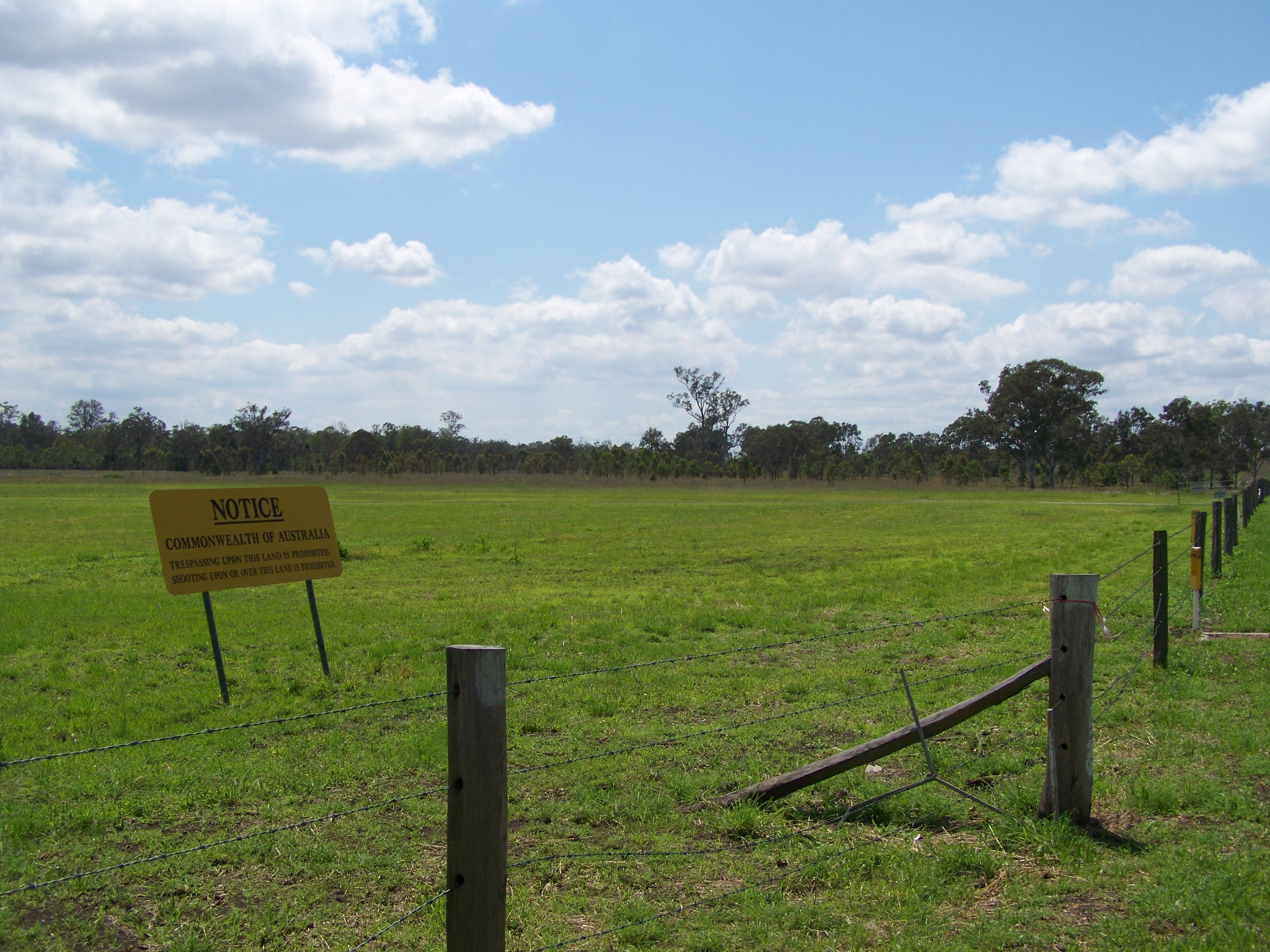
- No trespassing on the Amberley Air Base, 2010

- Coordinates: 27.6302°S 152.6994°E
- Population: 619 (2021 census)
  - Density: 23.72/km^{2} (61.43/sq mi)
- Postcode(s): 4306
- Area: 26.1 km^{2} (10.1 sq mi)
- Time zone: AEST (UTC+10:00)
- LGA(s): City of Ipswich
- State electorate(s): Ipswich West; Scenic Rim
- Federal division(s): Blair
Suburbs around Amberley:
Walloon	Karrabin	Wulkuraka
Jeebropilly	Amberley	Leichhardt; One Mile
Willowbank	Purga	Yamanto

Amberley is a suburb in the City of Ipswich, Queensland, Australia. In the 2021 census, Amberley had a population of 619 people.

== Geography ==
Australia's biggest air force base, the RAAF Base Amberley is situated here and the Bureau of Meteorology has a weather observation station in Amberley. To the south of Amberley is the Fassifern Valley. The Jeebropilly coal mine is located just to the west of Amberley.

Haigslea–Amberley Road runs through from west to south.

== History ==
The suburb is named after Amberley in the United Kingdom. The name was used by James and Martha Collett for their residence in the 1850s as it was their hometown. Previously the area was known as Three-Mile Creek, referring to it being three miles along on the Old Toowoomba Road from Ipswich.

In 1861, a school commenced at Willowbank on a sheep and cattle station owned by Darby McGrath. McGrath then asked the Queensland Government to take over and donated land for the construction of a new building, resulting in the opening of Warrill Creek State School opened on 22 May 1862 on what is now the south-western part of the RAAF Base Amberley. On 28 January 1888 the school relocated to a new site at Sandridge but it was flooded in 1893 by Warrill Creek. In 1903, it was renamed Amberley State School. This school is one of the oldest state primary schools in Queensland. The outbreak of World War II escalated activity on the air force base and it was decided to close the school at the end of 1941 and it re-opened at the start of 1947. Concerns about aircraft noise at the school lead to the construction of a new school on Rosewood Road further from the base in the late 1970s. On 1 January 2010, the school was again relocated to Deebing Creek Road, Yamanto and renamed Amberley District State School.

In December 1867 a United Methodist Free Church was opened at Three-Mile Creek.

== Demographics ==
In the 2016 census, Amberley had a population of 253 people.

In the 2021 census, Amberley had a population of 619 people.

== Education ==
There are no schools in Amberley. The nearest primary schools are Amberley District State School in neighbouring Yamanto to the east, Walloon State School in neighbouring Walloon to the north-west and Leichhardt State School in neighbouring Leichhardt to the north-east. The nearest secondary schools are Bremer State High School in Ipswich to the east and Rosewood State High School in Rosewood to the north-east.

== Climate ==
Amberley has a humid subtropical climate (Cfa) with hot humid summers and cool, crisp winters that have a high diurnal range which provide frost in some mornings. Its lowest temperature of −4.9 °C (23.2 °F) occurred on 8 August 1995, when southern Queensland suffered a severe cold snap. The previous coldest temperature was −4.3 °C (24.3 °F) reached on 29 July 1994. The town is fairly sunny, receiving 110.3 clear days.

Climate data for AMBERLEY AMO
Month	Jan	Feb	Mar	Apr	May	Jun	Jul	Aug	Sep	Oct	Nov	Dec	Year
Record high °C (°F)	44.3 (111.7)	43.0 (109.4)	41.3 (106.3)	36.8 (98.2)	33.3 (91.9)	29.9 (85.8)	29.6 (85.3)	36.5 (97.7)	40.1 (104.2)	41.3 (106.3)	43.0 (109.4)	43.8 (110.8)	44.3 (111.7)
Mean daily maximum °C (°F)	31.2 (88.2)	30.5 (86.9)	29.5 (85.1)	27.2 (81.0)	24.1 (75.4)	21.7 (71.1)	21.3 (70.3)	23.0 (73.4)	25.8 (78.4)	27.9 (82.2)	29.7 (85.5)	30.9 (87.6)	26.9 (80.4)
Mean daily minimum °C (°F)	19.7 (67.5)	19.5 (67.1)	17.9 (64.2)	14.0 (57.2)	9.9 (49.8)	7.0 (44.6)	5.4 (41.7)	6.2 (43.2)	9.5 (49.1)	13.3 (55.9)	16.3 (61.3)	18.4 (65.1)	13.1 (55.6)
Record low °C (°F)	11.6 (52.9)	11.1 (52.0)	6.7 (44.1)	1.0 (33.8)	−3.1 (26.4)	−4.3 (24.3)	−4.8 (23.4)	−4.9 (23.2)	−0.2 (31.6)	2.1 (35.8)	4.9 (40.8)	6.8 (44.2)	−4.9 (23.2)
Average precipitation mm (inches)	117.4 (4.62)	122.2 (4.81)	88.1 (3.47)	53.4 (2.10)	54.6 (2.15)	44.9 (1.77)	37.2 (1.46)	27.9 (1.10)	33.3 (1.31)	73.2 (2.88)	83.2 (3.28)	120.1 (4.73)	854.9 (33.66)
Average precipitation days	11.0	11.7	11.6	7.9	7.8	6.5	6.6	5.7	6.0	8.9	9.2	10.7	103.6
Average relative humidity (%)	51	54	52	48	48	46	42	38	38	43	46	49	46
