= Flinders Peak Group =

Unnamed range of hills in the country of Australia

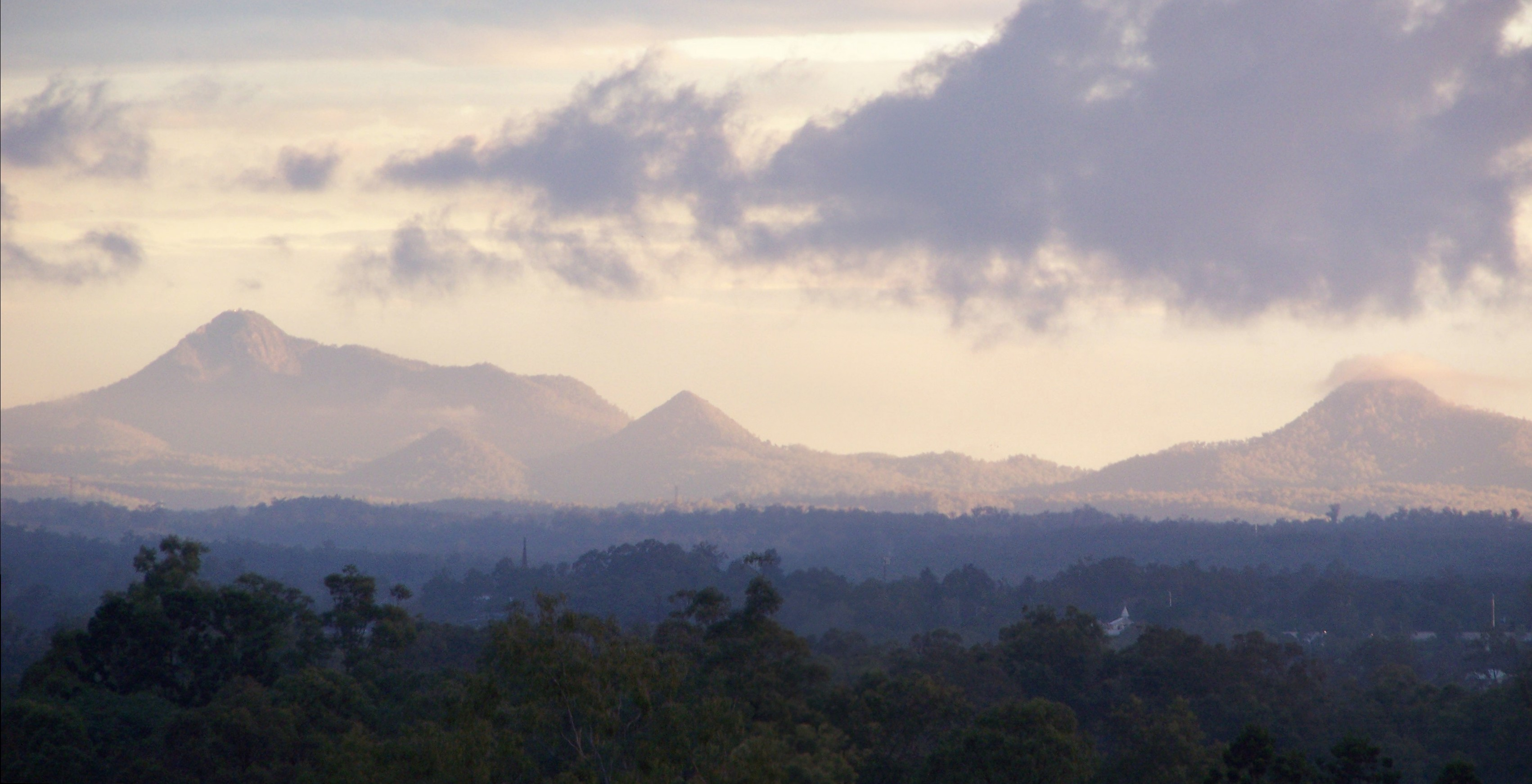
- Flinders Peak Group at Sunset, 2011

Highest point
- Peak: Flinders Peak
- Elevation: 679 m (2,228 ft)

Geography
- Location within Queensland
- Country: Australia
- State: Queensland
- Region: South East Queensland
- Range coordinates: 27°49′00″S 152°49′00″E
- Parent range: Scenic Rim

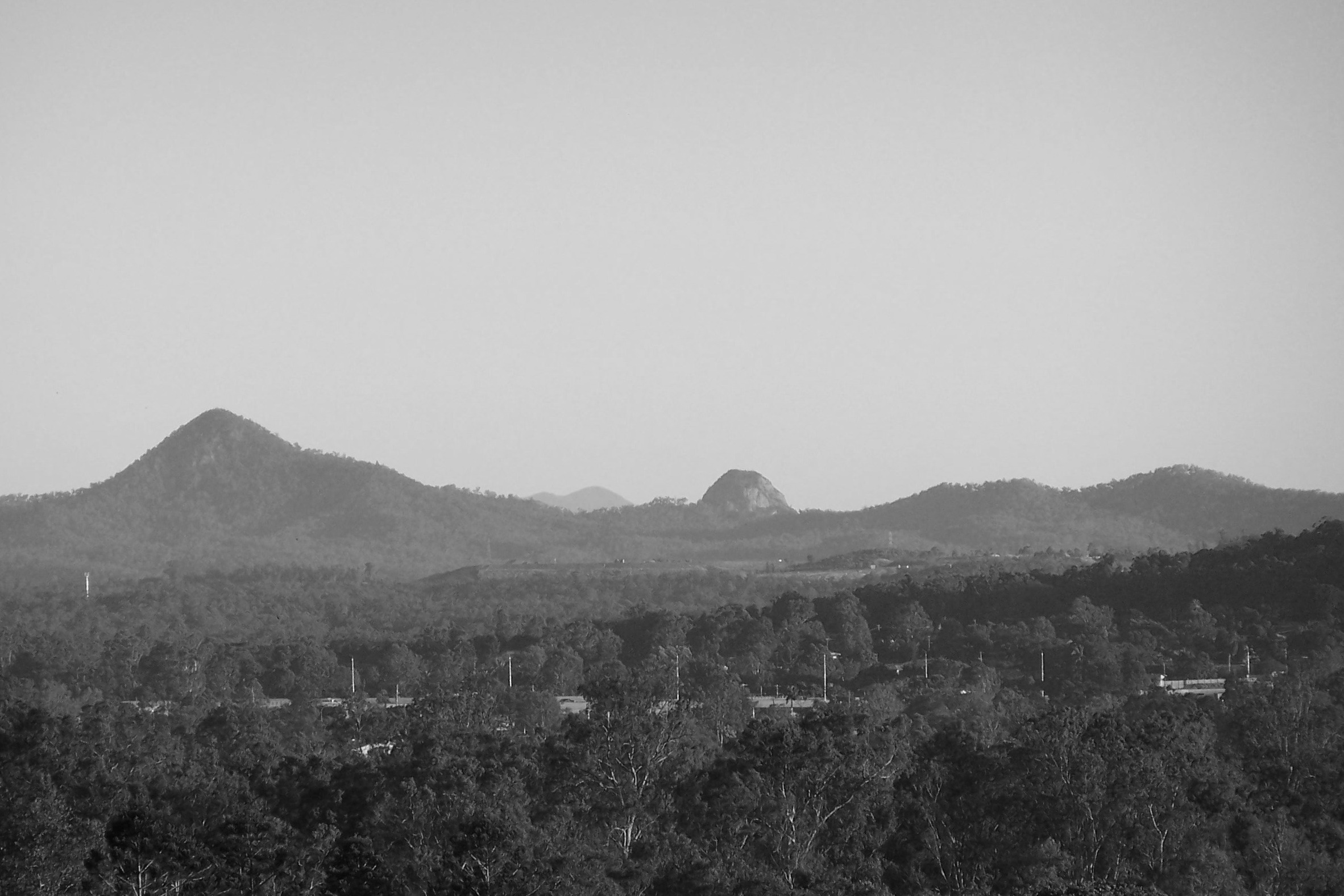
Mt Goolman, Ivorys Rock & Rocky Knoll

The Flinders Peak Group is an unnamed range of hills located on the northern edge of the Scenic Rim Region, south west of Logan City and south east of the City of Ipswich in South East Queensland, Australia. The summit in the Range is Flinders Peak reaching 680 metres (2,230 ft) above sea level.

The first Europeans to cross the range were Patrick Logan and his exploration party in June 1827. Most of the range remains naturally vegetated within a series of protected areas. Both the Flinders-Goolman Conservation Estate and the Flinders Peak Conservation Park are located along this range.

Other mountains include Mount Joyce, Mount Blaine, Mount Goolman, Mount Elliott, Mount Flintoff, Mount Welcome, Ivorys Rock, and Mount Perry (near Ripley). The range is visible from many locations around the Scenic Rim.

== Landforms ==
| Landform | Aboriginal name | Height | Latitude (DMS) | Longitude (DMS) | Latitude (Decimal) | Longitude (Decimal) | Coordinates |
|---|---|---|---|---|---|---|---|
| Flinders Peak | Booroong'pah | 679 m | −27° 49′ 0″ S | 152° 49′ 0″ E | −27.81667° | 152.81667° | 27.81667°S 152.81667°E |
| Mount Joyce | | 469 m | −27° 54′ 0″ S | 152° 48′ 0″ E | −27.9° | 152.8° | 27.9°S 152.8°E |
| Mount Blaine | Ginginbaar | 457 m | −27° 46′ 59″ S | 152° 48′ 0″ E | −27.78333° | 152.8° | 27.78333°S 152.8°E |
| Mount Perry | | 348 m | -27°46'37.7" S | 152°48'45.9" E | -27.777135° | 152.812758° | 27.777135°S 152.812758°E |
| Mount Goolman | Possibly, Goolman | 454 m | −27° 46′ 0″ S | 152° 48′ 0″ E | −27.76667° | 152.8° | 27.76667°S 152.8°E |
| Mount Elliott | | 436 m | −27° 49′ 0″ S | 152° 49′ 0″ E | −27.81667° | 152.81667° | 27.81667°S 152.81667°E |
| Mount Flintoff | | 351 m | −27° 52′ 59″ S | 152° 49′ 59″ E | −27.88333° | 152.83333° | 27.88333°S 152.83333°E |
| Mount Welcome | | 341 m | −27° 49′ 59″ S | 152° 48′ 0″ E | −27.83333° | 152.8° | 27.83333°S 152.8°E |
| Ivorys Rock | Muntambin | 309 m | −27° 46′ 0″ S | 152° 47′ 0″ E | −27.76667° | 152.78334° | 27.76667°S 152.78334°E |
| Source: Geoscience Australia | | | | | | | |

The southernmost mountain of the range is Mount Joyce, which is separated from the Dugandan Range by Teviot Brook.

== History ==
The local Ugarapul people call Flinder's Peak, Booroong'pah or Booroongapah or Booroongpah. It is a sacred site because they believe that the powerful spirit, "Yurrangpul", lives there, and guards their traditions and sacred places. His name is similar to the local word for green tree frog: "Yurrang". The green tree frog is the totem of the Ugarapul people. Mount Blaine is known to the Ugarapul people as Ginginbaar, and the Ugarapul meaning for Goolman, used in Mount Goolman, is Axe.

== Naming ==
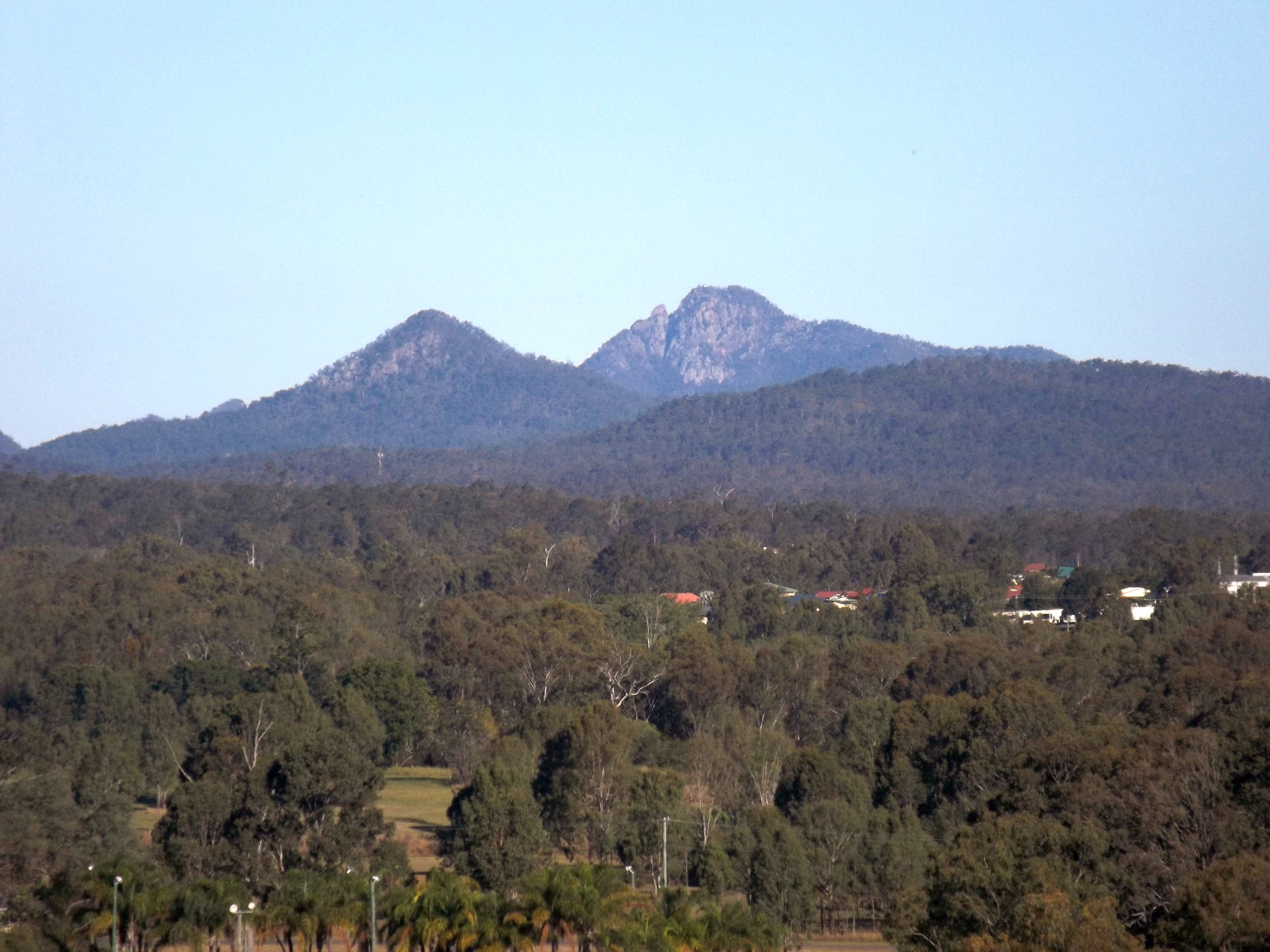
Flinders Peak (right) in Peak Crossing and Mount Perry in Lyons seen from Ipswich, 2016

The peaks of the range derived their names as follows:

- Flinders Peak (Aboriginal: Booroong'pah) was originally named High Peak in July 1799 by Lieutenant Matthew Flinders RN (1774–1814) navigator, hydrographer and scientist, HM Colonial Sloop Norfolk. The name Flinders Peak was first used by John Oxley (1785?-1828) Surveyor General during his explorations in 1824, as a change from High Peak of Flinders.
- Mount Joyce, formerly known as Kents Peak, so marked on a map of the Moreton Bay District published in 1842 by Robert Dixon (1800–1858) surveyor.
- Mount Blaine (Aboriginal: Ginginbaar) is probably named after John Blaine ( - 1908) who took up land near Peak Crossing in 1869 as the owner of Portion 89, Parish of Goolman.
- Mount Goolman, formerly named by John Oxley as Murdoch Peak, is derived from the Yuggera language indicating stone axe. Murdoch Peak was probably named after Peter Murdoch, superintendent of the agricultural establishment at Emu Plains.
- Mount Elliott is reportedly named after Robert Elliott who took up land in 1868.
- Ivorys Rock (Aboriginal: Muntambin) is named after James Ivory (1820–1887) grazier, who held freehold land in the Bundamba and around this range.

== Water catchment ==
The range drains into both the Bremer River Basin (sub-basin of Brisbane River Basin) and via Teviot Brook into the Logan River Basin (sub-basin of Logan-Albert River Basin). Teviot Brook is a major tributary of the Logan River that also supplies water to Wyaralong Dam.

== Land ownership and control ==
The Flinders-Goolman Conservation Estate is a collection of freehold and public land that is either owned or controlled by Ipswich City Council. The estate is not a protected area under the Nature Conservation Act 1992.

The Flinders Peak Conservation Park is entirely surrounded by (and separate from) the Flinders-Coolman Conservation Estate. The Conservation Park is controlled by the Queensland Department of Environment and Resource Management with the trustee being Ipswich City Council.

Mount Perry Conservation Park is located near Mount Perry in the Logan City Council local government area. The conservation Park was formerly managed by the Beaudesert shire council. Today it is controlled by the Queensland Parks and Wildlife Service, with the trustee being the Logan City Council.

== Public access ==
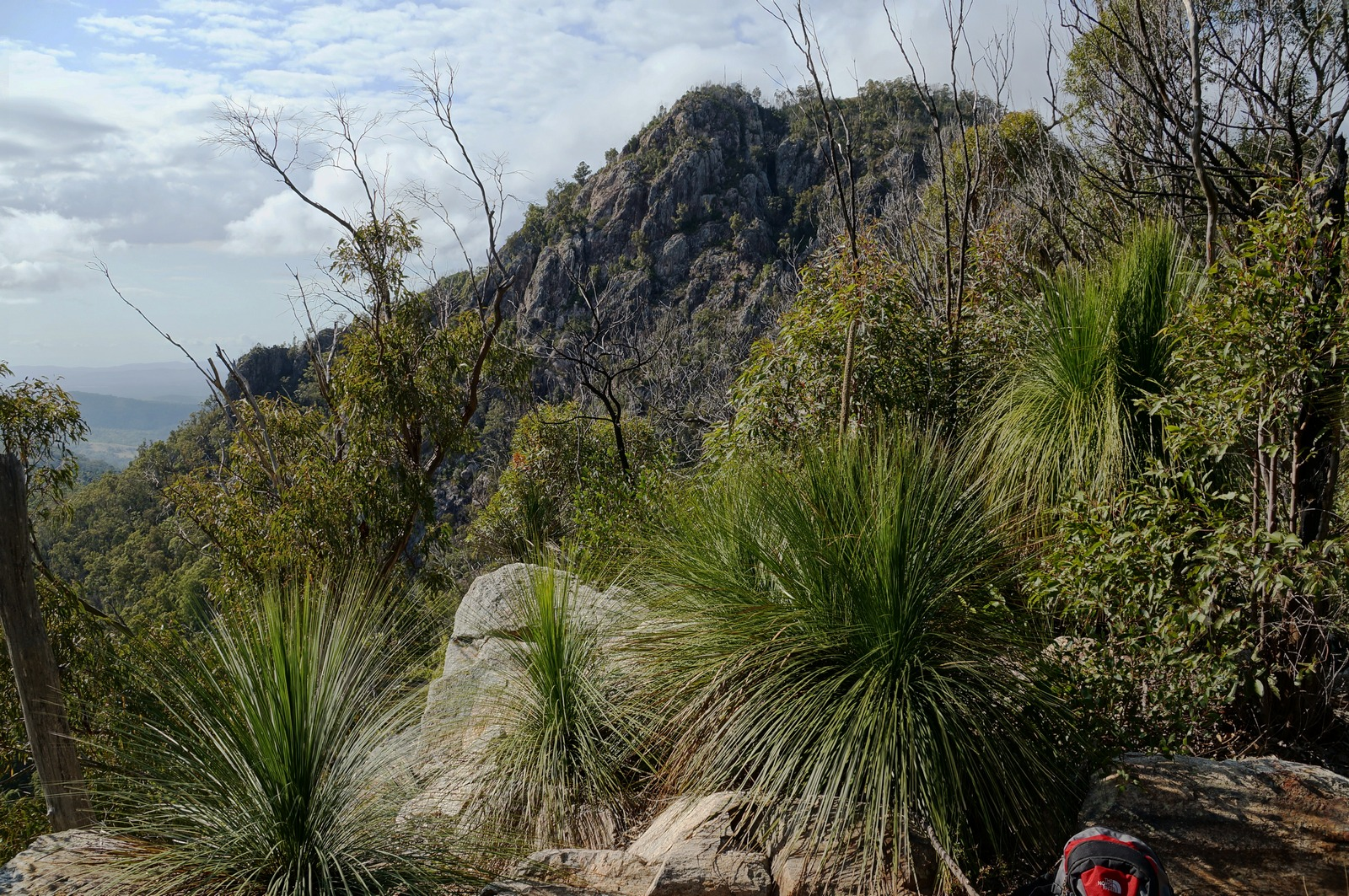
Rocks and grass-tress on the way to Flinders peak (close)

=== Flinders Peak track ===
Flinders Peak Track, used to access Flinders Peak, was closed to the general public by Ipswich City Council in November 2009 in the interest of public safety. One section of the track was deemed too difficult for the general public to negotiate so Council are endeavouring to re-align it for safer public access. All other tracks within the Estate have remained open. Some social commentators question the reason why the Flinders Peak Track is closed. It has since been reopened, with a slight detour to avoid the difficult section.

=== Boonah to Ipswich Trail ===
As of December 2010, the Queensland Department of Infrastructure and Planning were consulting stakeholders in regard to developing the Boonah-to-Ipswich Trail, a 68 kilometre multi-use non-motorised recreation trail, in partnership with five local Councils. The development of the trail is in accordance with the South East Queensland Regional Trails Strategy (2007). The 19 kilometres (12 mi) located within Ipswich City is planned to wind through the Flinders Goolman Conservation Estate and also will be the northern terminus of the trail. At the foot of Mount Joyce against Teviot Brook a recreation park is planned to incorporate the Boonah-to-Ipswich Trail.

=== Mount Perry Track ===
Mount Perry conservation park only has one trail along a ridge line towards Mount Perry. The Mountain itself is located on private property. Access into the park can only be made by walking. The track can be accessed by Ripely Road.

== See also ==
- List of mountains in Australia
