= Ripley Valley State Secondary College =

Public secondary school in South Ripley, Queensland

Location
- Location in Queensland
- 18 Parkway Avenue; South Ripley, Queensland, 4306; Australia; 27.6942°S 152.8103°E

Information
- Type: Public secondary school
- Motto: Achieving Excellence Together
- Established: 2020
- Educational authority: Queensland Department of Education
- School code: A797
- Principal: Brendan Krueger
- Years offered: 7–12
- Enrolment: 1,495 (February 2026)
- Website: ripleyvalleyssc.eq.edu.au

Ripley Valley State Secondary College is a public secondary school in South Ripley, Queensland, Australia. The school opened on 28 January 2020 with 132 students and teaches students in Years 7 to 12. The Queensland Schools Directory listed an enrolment of 1,495 students in February 2026.

== History ==
During the 2017 Queensland state election, a proposed new secondary school at Ripley Valley was included in an election commitment to build six new schools.

The Queensland Government announced the school's final name and catchment in September 2019, several months before opening. It was planned to open for Year 7 and Year 8 students in 2020. The secondary school was budgeted at $70 million and scheduled to open in 2020. The planned campus included educational, sporting and design facilities.

Ripley Valley State Secondary College opened on 28 January 2020 with 132 students. Further stages of construction were planned as the Ripley Valley developed. A further expansion followed later in 2020, including additional science, resource and senior-learning facilities.

By 2024, enrolment had grown to 1,050 students and the college was preparing to graduate its first Year 12 cohort. The first Year 12 students graduated in November 2024.

== Campus and facilities ==
The school's second stage of construction included an information services centre, additional learning spaces, a science centre and a performing arts centre.

The performing arts centre was under construction by August 2023. The $22.9 million two-storey centre opened in August 2024 and includes a theatre, practice rooms, acting and dance studios, and drama and music learning areas.

In December 2025, upgraded athletics facilities were officially opened at the college in partnership with Providence Athletics. The project included a tartan training area, javelin runway, high-jump and long-jump pits, three throwing circles, a discus and hammer cage, and a dedicated equipment shed and technical area. The upgrades were supported by the Queensland Government's Minor Infrastructure and Inclusive Facilities Fund.

The campus also includes ANZAC Place, a memorial space. In 2026, the school's Parents and Citizens' Association received a $10,000 grant to add plaques and construct a new memorial within the space.

A $35.9 million two-storey learning centre was completed at the school in 2026. The building included 32 classrooms and specialist learning areas.

== Esports program ==
The college's esports program began as a lunchtime club before developing into a formal school program. By 2025, the program had about 100 participating students and included activities linked to the Australian Curriculum's Digital Technologies content.

A Year 9 mathematics assessment also used esports activities for students to collect and analyse competition data.

== Transport ==
School bus services used by students from Ripley Valley State Secondary College and the neighbouring state primary school were the subject of overcrowding and delay concerns in 2025. The college's Parents and Citizens' Association and two local state MPs supported calls for additional services.

Concerns continued later that year, including complaints of long waits and overcrowded buses.

== Proposed athletics track ==
In August 2026, Ipswich City Council voted to pursue a partnership with the Department of Education to investigate delivering a synthetic athletics track at Ripley Valley State Secondary College. The proposal included long-term community access and a conditional $2.5 million council contribution if the project secured Queensland Government funding.

The school and Providence Athletics Club later presented design plans for the proposed track.

== See also ==
- Education in Queensland
- List of schools in Greater Brisbane
- South Ripley, Queensland
