= Bremer State High School =

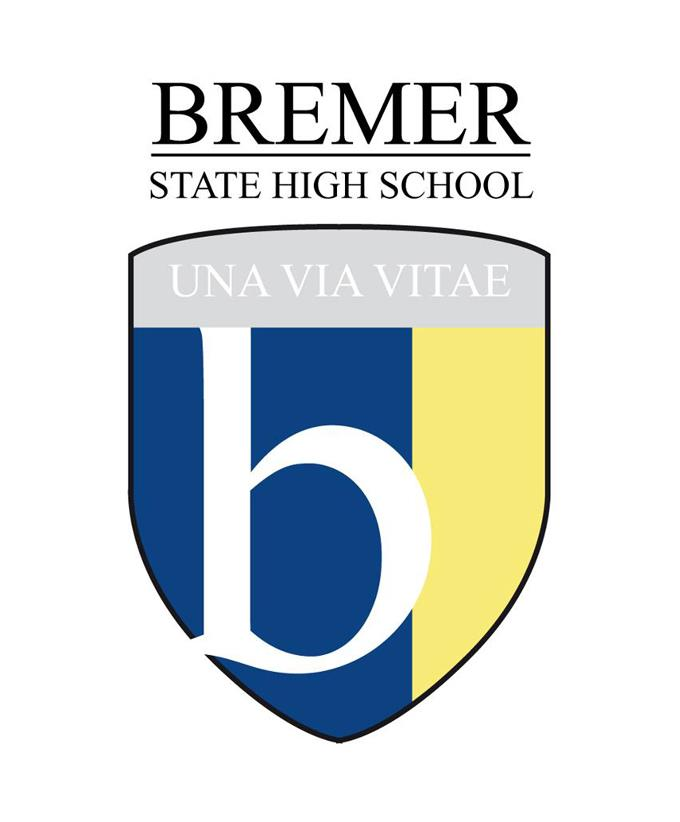

Location
- Ipswich, Queensland; Australia; 27°38′07″S 152°45′10″E

Information
- Type: Public, co-educational, secondary, day school
- Motto: Latin: Una Via Vitae
- Established: 1959
- Principal: Christine Owen
- Campus: Urban (Churchill)
- Colours: Yellow, royal blue and grey
- Website: bremershs.eq.edu.au

Bremer State High School (Bremer SHS) is a public co-educational secondary school located in Ipswich, Queensland, Australia. It is administered by the Queensland Department of Education, with an enrolment of 1,925 students and a teaching staff of 149, as of 2023. The school serves students from Year 7 to Year 12.

== History ==
The school opened on 26 or 27 January 1959, with 120 foundation students. The foundation principal was Mr. Wesley Donaldson Napier.

It was located in the Ipswich suburb of Silkstone, until the end of the school year in 2010, when it was relocated.

== Relocation ==
Bremer State High School was originally built at 73 Blackstone Road, Silkstone (27.620825°S 152.780042°E) from 1959 until it was relocated in 2011.

It was announced in March 2009 that Bremer State High School would be relocated. The new school was constructed on 133–135 Warwick Road next to the Ipswich campus of the University of Queensland (subsequently a campus of the University of Southern Queensland) at a cost of approximately $73 million which was part of the Queensland Government's $850 million State Schools of Tomorrow initiative. To accommodate the move the golf course adjacent to the new school had to undergo a $1 million redesign. The move occurred due to ongoing maintenance problems at the school's former site caused by land movement and active soils. The new school opened in 2011.

Due to this relocation, the school subsequently underwent several changes such as a new uniform which included a one-off foundation shirt. Bremer State High School was also selected as one of the pilot schools for the move of Year 7s to high school for 2013, as part of a push for a national curriculum which would see all Year 7s in Queensland at high school in 2015. This pilot program would also allow all Year 7s access to a 32 GB Wi-Fi version of the Apple iPad 2 tablet if Anna Bligh were to be elected in the 2012 Queensland state election.

In late February 2012, the old campus was sold from the Queensland Government to the Ipswich City Council for proposed redevelopment of the school buildings and the utilisation of the ovals for future local sports fields. In June 2016, it was announced that the site would undergo an $85 million development as the Silkstone Urban Renewal Project, with residential, shopping and parkland components.
