= List of Ipswich Grammar School Old Boys =

Alumni of Ipswich Grammar School in Ipswich, Queensland, Australia are known as 'Old Boys' and automatically gain membership into the schools alumni association, the IGS Old Boys Association (IGSOBA). Established in 1907, IGSOBA organises regular reunions and occasional sporting competitions.

Some notable Old Boys of Ipswich Grammar School include:

== Academic ==
- Alfred Paxton Backhouse – judge and Deputy-Chancellor of Sydney University, son of the architect, Benjamin Backhouse who designed some of the school buildings
- Walter Heywood Bryan – Professor of Geology, University of Queensland and first Doctor of Science at UQ. (1910)
- Frederick William Whitehouse – Associate Professor of Geology at University of Queensland and first person from Queensland to take a PhD at the University of Cambridge. (1918)

== Architecture, building and engineering ==
- Dr John Bradfield – Engineer famous for designing the Sydney Harbour Bridge and the Story Bridge; Developed the Bradfield Scheme for diverting rivers west of the Great Dividing Range

== Entertainment, media and the arts ==
- John Birmingham – Author, best known for He Died With A Felafel In His Hand
- Charles Chauvel – Pioneer of the Australian film industry; Influential early film director; Credits include Jedda (first colour feature film made in Australia), In The Wake Of The Bounty, 40,000 Horsemen and The Rats Of Tobruk
- Hugh Cornish – television executive
- David McCormack – Lead singer of the band Custard and voice of Bandit Heeler on Bluey
- George Miller – Hollywood director, screenwriter and producer. Credits include Mad Max, Babe, Babe: Pig in the City, Lorenzo's Oil and The Witches of Eastwick
- Pacharo Mzembe – Actor, Underbelly: Razor
- Vance Palmer – Eminent Australian novelist, dramatist, essayist and critic; the Vance Palmer Literary Prize is presented annually at IGS
- Colin Petersen – Actor, drummer
- Percy Savage – fashion publicist, designer, artist, raconteur and bon viveur.
- Thomas Shapcott – Writer and poet; Former Professor of Creative Writing at University of Adelaide; Current Fellow at the National Library of Australia

== Military ==
- Lt. Gen. John Coates AC MBE – Commandant of the Royal Military College, Duntroon; Head of the Australian Defence Staff, Washington and Chief of the General Staff, Australian Army
- Walde Fisher – Australian Infantry Soldier killed in action in World War I
- Major Percival Savage DSO MBE – Gallipoli veteran, farmer, chairman of the Committee of Direction of Fruit Marketing, Queensland for 30 years.

== National Honours ==
- Manuel Michael Varitimos CBE (Barrister, QC) – awarded the CBE in 2016 for services to the Papua and New Guinean community through the advancement of justice and the rule of law.

== Politics, public service and the law ==
- Charles Booker – former member for Wide Bay and Maryborough in the Queensland Legislative Assembly.
- Sir Llewellyn Edwards – Former State Liberal Party leader; Deputy Premier and Treasurer of Queensland; Chairman and Chief Executive for World Expo '88; Former Chancellor of the University of Queensland
- Sir Harry Gibbs – Chief Justice of the High Court of Australia; Puisne judge of the High Court of Australia
- Norm Jensen – Member of the First Australian Capital Territory Legislative Assembly –1989 to 1991.
- Peter Slipper – Former federal member for the electorate of Fisher and Speaker of the House of Representatives
- Thomas Welsby – Member of the Queensland Legislative Assembly
- Jon Krause – Member for Beaudesert in the Queensland Legislative Assembly
- Sam O'Connor – Member for Bonney in the Queensland Legislative Assembly
- Paul Scarr – Senator for Queensland in the Australian Senate
- Garth Hamilton – Member for Groom in the Australian House of Representatives

== Medicine and science ==
- Raymond Dart – Anatomist and anthropologist best known for his controversial discovery of the Taung Child, or Australopithecus africanus

== Sport ==
=== Basketball ===
- Matt Hodgson – professional basketball player

=== Cricket ===
- Cameron Gannon – cricketer for Queensland
- Craig McDermott – Australian Test cricketer
- Francis Ramsay – cricketer for Queensland
- Nathan Reardon – cricketer for Queensland
- Mark Steketee – cricketer for Queensland
- Shane Watson – Australian cricketer

=== Rugby League ===
- Kirisome Auva'a – Parramatta Eels
- Dud Beattie – Australian Kangaroos
- Willie Carne – Brisbane Broncos, Queensland, Australia; also played Rugby Union for the Queensland Reds
- Johnny Hunt – Australian Kangaroos
- Martin Kennedy – Sydney Roosters
- Brett Plowman – Brisbane Broncos
- Craig Polla-Mounter – Canterbury-Bankstown Bulldogs
- Junior Sau – Newcastle Knights
- Lagi Setu – St George-Illawarra Dragons, Brisbane Broncos
- Lama Tasi – Sydney Roosters
- Kevin Walters – Brisbane Broncos and Australian Kangaroos
- Kerrod Walters – Brisbane Broncos and Australian Kangaroos
- Steven Walters – Canberra Raiders, Queensland State of Origin, Australian Kangaroos
- Sam Walker – Sydney Roosters
- Ethan King – Sydney Roosters

=== Rugby Union ===
- Albert Anae – Queensland Reds
- Berrick Barnes – Queensland Reds and Wallaby Vice Captain New South Wales Waratahs
- Nic Berry – Queensland Reds
- Herbert Bullmore – Scotland (also grandfather of Kerry Packer)
- Rodney Davies – Queensland Reds #1231, Australia 7s
- Eric Francis – Ipswich's first Wallaby #140, Queensland #347
- Tu Tamarua – Played in Europe and represented the Pacific Islanders team
- David Wilson – Rugby World Cup and Bledisloe Cup winning Wallaby flanker

=== Tennis ===
- Roy Emerson – International Tennis Hall of Fame inductee; former record holder for most Grand Slam men's singles titles
- Robert Smeets – Australian Open Men's Doubles player
