= Eric Francis =

Eric Francis may refer to:

- Eric Francis (journalist) (born 1964), American journalist and astrologer, born Eric Francis Coppolino
- Eric Francis (actor) (1912–1991), credits include Theatre of Blood and Monty Python's The Meaning of Life
- Eric Francis (architect) (1887–1976), British architect
- Eric Francis (rugby union) (1894–1983), Australian rugby union player
