= Woodend, Queensland =

Woodend
- Suburb
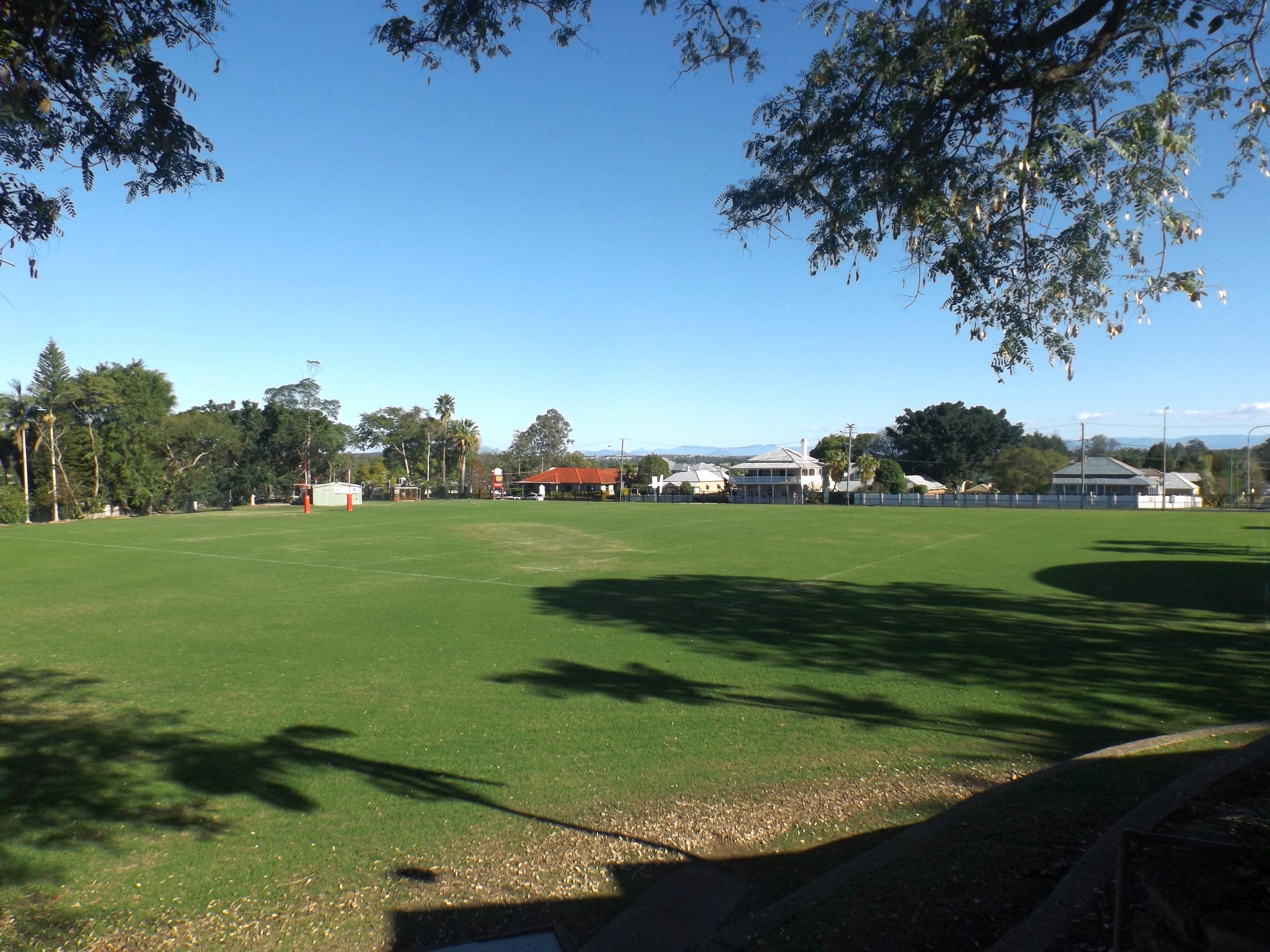
- Ipswich Grammar School sports oval, 2016

- Coordinates: 27.6047°S 152.7530°E
- Country: Australia
- State: Queensland
- City: Ipswich
- LGA: City of Ipswich
- Location: 1.6 km (0.99 mi) NW of Ipswich CBD; 45.2 km (28.1 mi) SW of Brisbane CBD

Government
  - State electorate: Ipswich
  - Federal division: Blair

Area
  - Total: 1.3 km^{2} (0.50 sq mi)

Population
  - Total: 1,483 (2021 census)
  - Density: 1,140/km^{2} (2,950/sq mi)
- Time zone: UTC+10:00 (AEST)
- Postcode: 4305
Suburbs around Woodend
Brassall	Brassall	North Ipswich
Coalfalls	Woodend	North Ipswich
Sadliers Crossing	Ipswich CBD	Ipswich CBD

Woodend is an inner suburb of Ipswich in the City of Ipswich, Queensland, Australia. In the 2021 census, Woodend had a population of 1,483 people.

== Geography ==
Woodend's northern and eastern border is defined by the meandering course of the Bremer River.

At 50 metres (160 ft) above sea level, Grammar School Hill is a prominent landmark in Ipswich (27.61278°S 152.75083°E) and is the site of Ipswich Grammar School, the first Grammar School in Queensland.

Ipswich Pteropus Conservation Park is a 1.8-hectare (4.4-acre) protected area on the north-western boundary of the locality adjacent to the Bremer River (27.6031°S 152.7481°E). It is also known as Woodend Nature Reserve and is a conservation area for Pteropus poliocephalus (grey-headed flying foxes).

Apart from the conservation park, the land use is prdominantly residential.

== History ==
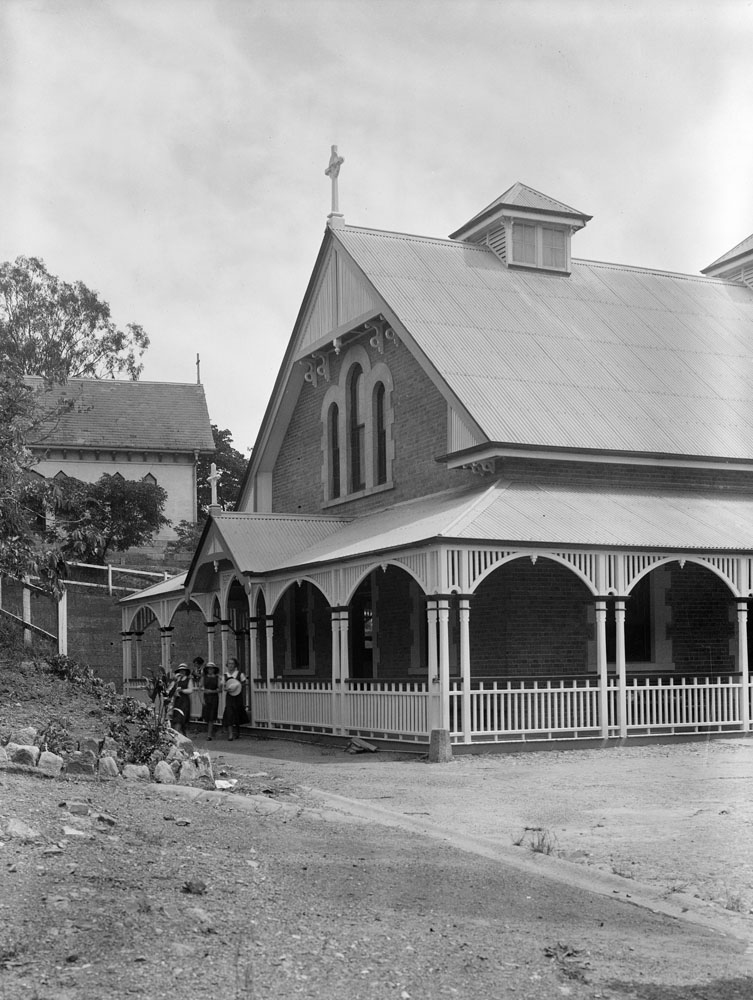
St Mary's Catholic Primary School, 1940s

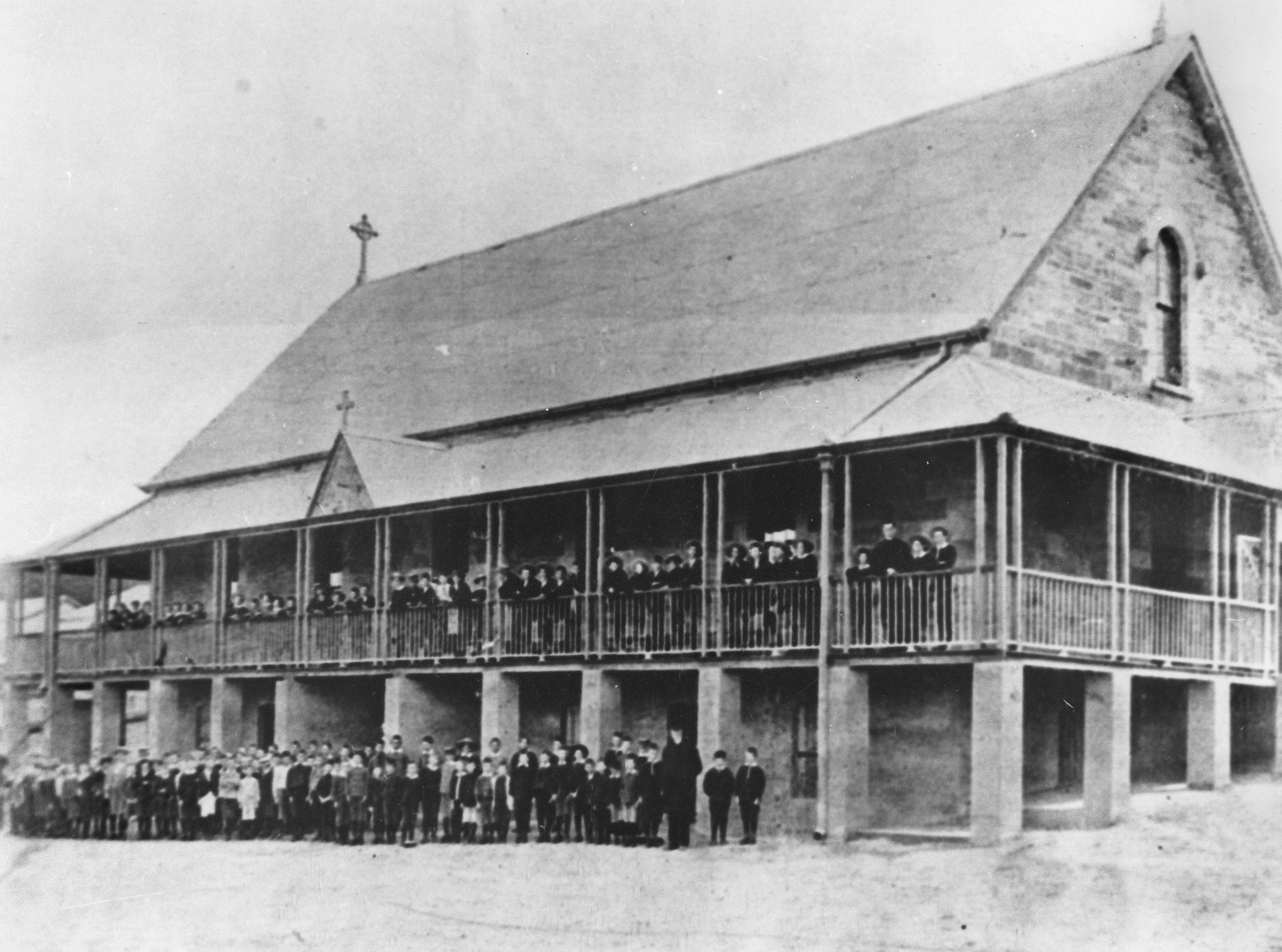
Christian Brothers' School, circa 1892

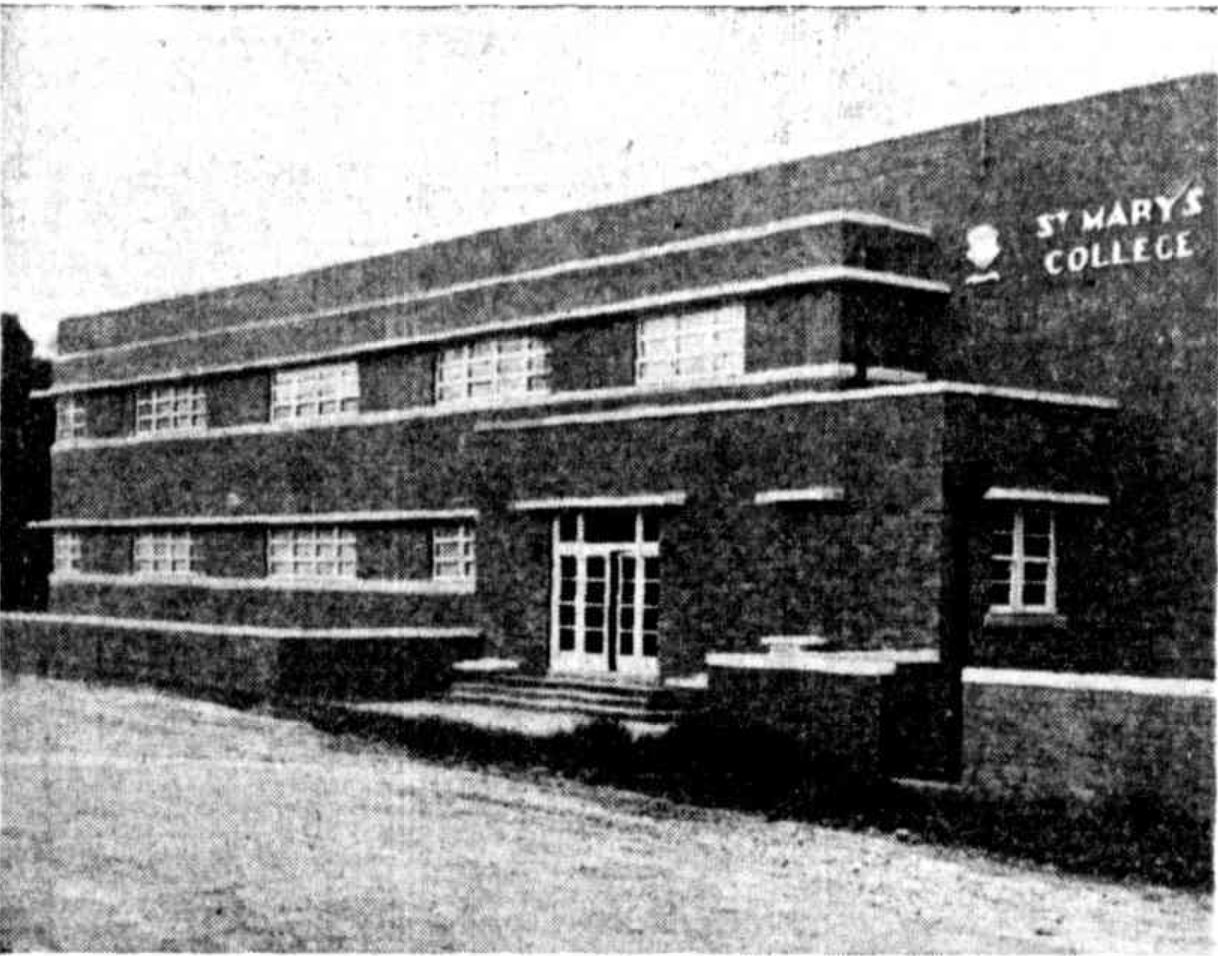
St Mary's College at its opening, January 1948

The origin of the suburb name is from the house Woodend, the residence of Arthur Macalister, a Scottish migrant who became the second Premier of Queensland.

In 1848, Woodend Pocket was the first coal-bearing crown land in the Ipswich area to be subdivided into small 'coal allotments.

In 1854, Englishman John Ferrett opened the first successful Ipswich coal mine in the Woodend area (The Radstock Pit).

In 1862, John Panton grew the first cotton in Ipswich in the Woodend area.

One of Ipswich's first schools was opened by Daniel McGrath, 1847 in the Woodend area.

Following its early days as coal lots, the Woodend area was mostly cleared of bush by the 1860s. Woodend became a middle class suburb with a residential heritage.

St Mary's Primary School was established in May 1863 by the Sisters of Mercy under the leadership of Mother Vincent Whitty. On the first day more than 100 students were enrolled.

Ipswich Grammar School opened on 25 September 1863. It was the first school to open as a result of the Grammar Schools Act of 1860.

In 1892, the Christian Brothers arrived in Ipswich and established St Mary's Christian Brothers College as a separate boys' school on the corner of Mary and Elizabeth Streets. In the early 1960s, the demand for secondary education was increasing so entire new school was proposed. On 21 February 1965, the first building was blessed by Archbishop Duhig Archbishop of Brisbane. The school was renamed St Edmund's College at that time.

On Sunday 6 October 1946, Archbishop James Duhig laid the foundation stone for St Mary's College, a Catholic secondary school for girls. The ceremony was attended by over 1,000 people. On Sunday 16 January 1948, Duhig returned to officially open St Mary's College in a ceremony attended by over 5,000 people.

In 1991, the primary school of St Edmund's College was incorporated into St Mary's Primary School to create a co-educational school.

Ipswich Pteropus Conservation Park was gazetted on 10 March 1995.

== Demographics ==
In the 2016 census, Woodend had a population of 1,302 people.

In the 2021 census, Woodend had a population of 1,483 people.

== Heritage listings ==
Ipswich has a number of heritage-listed sites, including:

- St Marys Roman Catholic Church Precinct, Mary Street (27.61°S 152.7561°E)
- Ipswich Grammar School Buildings, Mary Street (27.6127°S 152.7521°E)

== Education ==
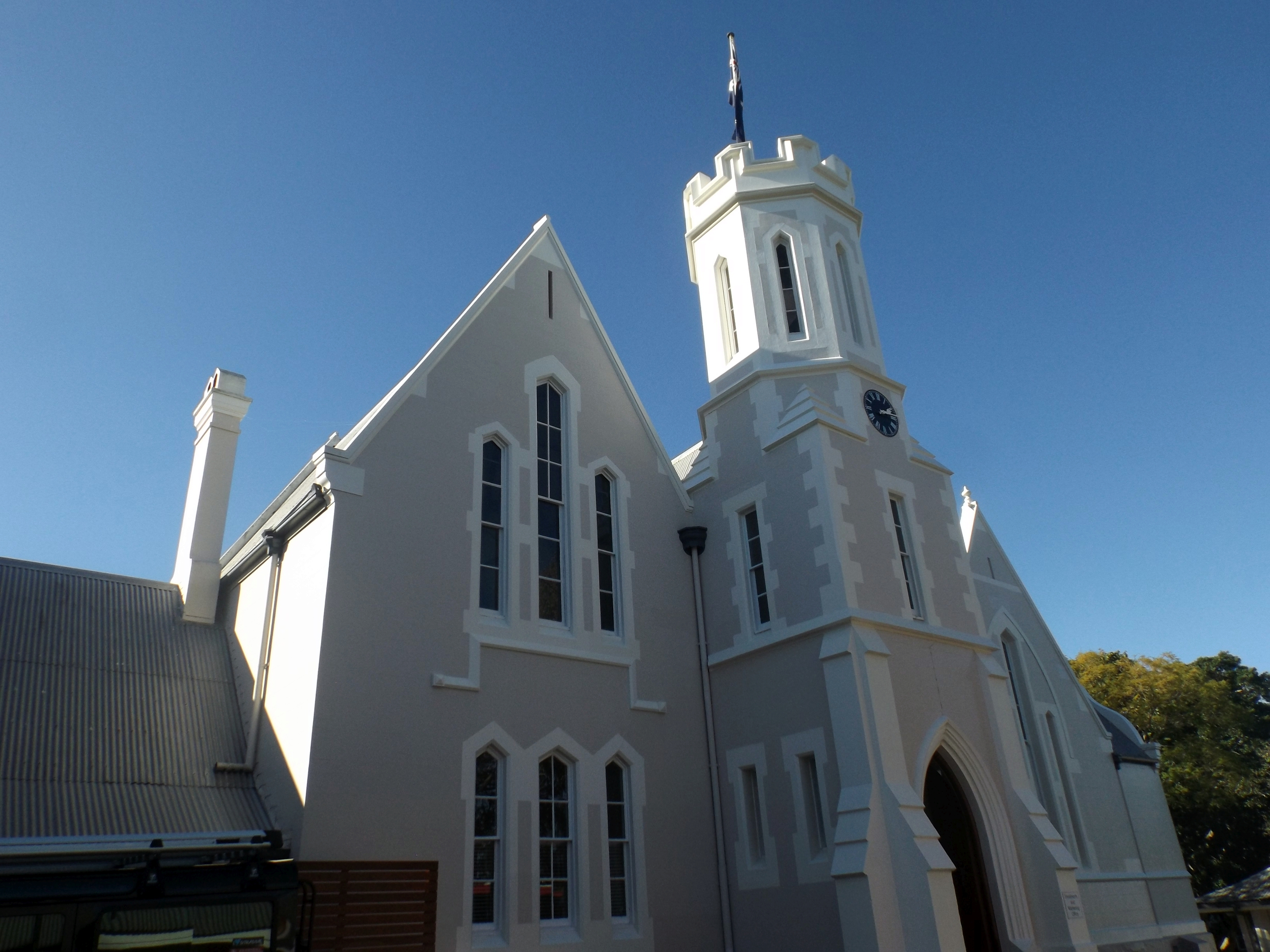
Ipswich Grammar School

St Mary's Primary School is a Catholic primary (Prep-6) school for boys and girls at 3 Mary Street (27.6094°S 152.7547°E). In 2018, the school had an enrolment of 566 students with 35 teachers (31 full-time equivalent) and 20 non-teaching staff (13 full-time equivalent).

Ipswich Grammar School is a private primary and secondary (Prep-12) school for boys on Darling Street (27.6141°S 152.7524°E). In 2018, the school had an enrolment of 929 students with 74 teachers (72 full-time equivalent) and 69 non-teaching staff (50 full-time equivalent).

St Edmund's College is a Catholic secondary (7–12) school for boys at 16 Mary Street (27.6095°S 152.7545°E). In 2018, the school had an enrolment of 1031 students with 81 teachers (80 full-time equivalent) and 64 non-teaching staff (51 full-time equivalent).

St Mary's College is a Catholic secondary (7–12) school for girls at 11 Mary Street (27.6110°S 152.7558°E). In 2018, the school had an enrolment of 599 students with 50 teachers (46 full-time equivalent) and 30 non-teaching staff (22 full-time equivalent).

There are no government schools in Woodend. The nearest government primary school is Blair State School in neighbouring Sadliers Crossing to the south-west. The nearest government secondary schools are Ipswich State High School in neighbouring Brassall to the north and Bremer State High School in neighbouring Ipswich CBD to the south.

== Transport ==
Woodend has no train station; however it is serviced by the nearby Ipswich railway station.

== Amenities ==
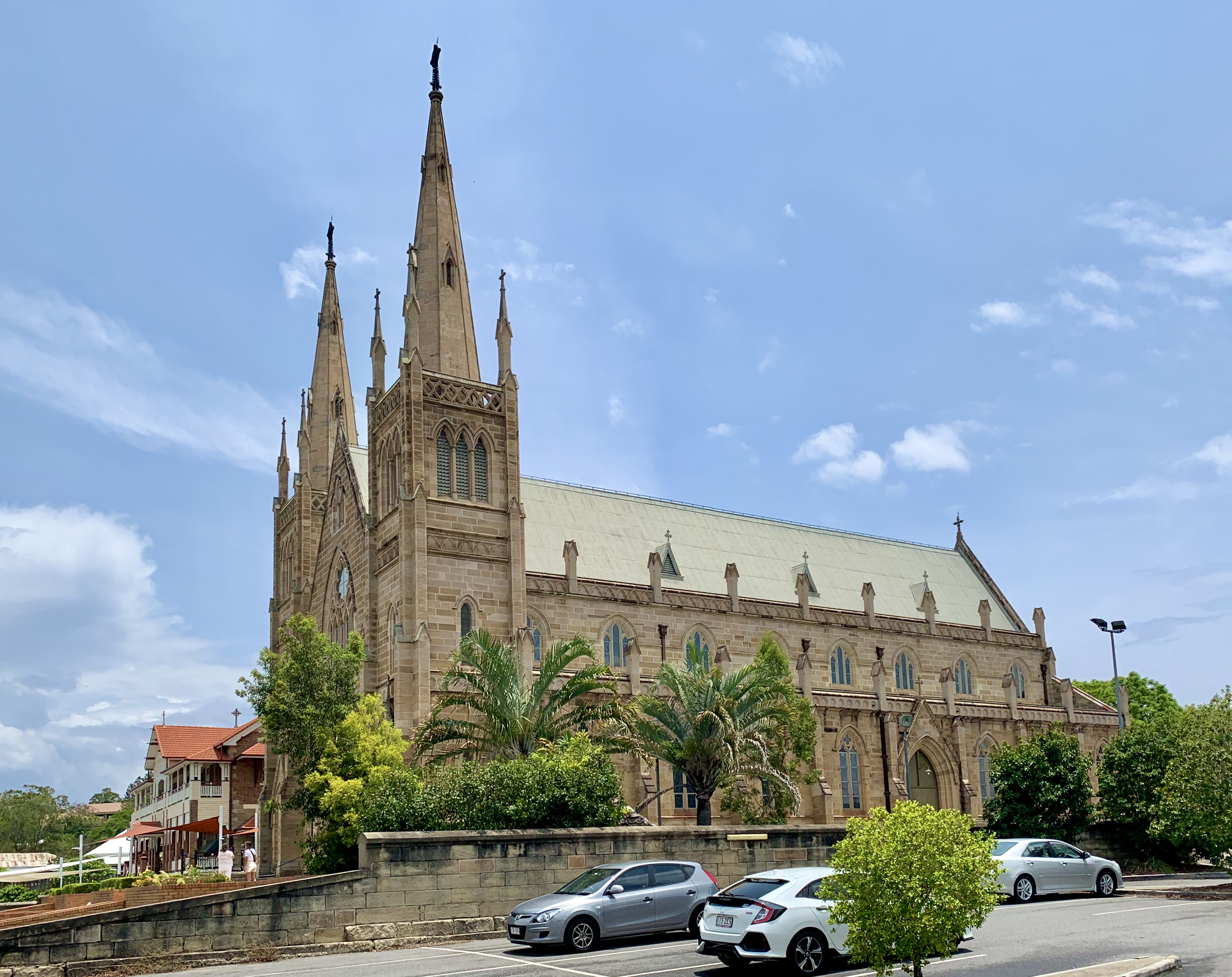
St Marys Roman Catholic Church, 2020

St Mary's Catholic Church is at 1A Elizabeth Street (adjacent to St Mary's Primary School, 27.6107°S 152.7564°E).

There are a number of parks in the area:

- Harlin Road Reserve (27.6053°S 152.7485°E)
- Hayne Street Reserve (27.6013°S 152.7498°E)
- Macrae Street Reserve (27.6059°S 152.7492°E)
- Roseberry Parade Reserve (27.6096°S 152.7573°E)
- Smith Park (27.6080°S 152.7491°E)
- Timothy Molony Park (Owned by Saint Mary's Catholic Parish)
- Woodend Park (27.5981°S 152.7537°E)
