= Wulkuraka, Queensland =

Wulkuraka Ipswich, Queensland
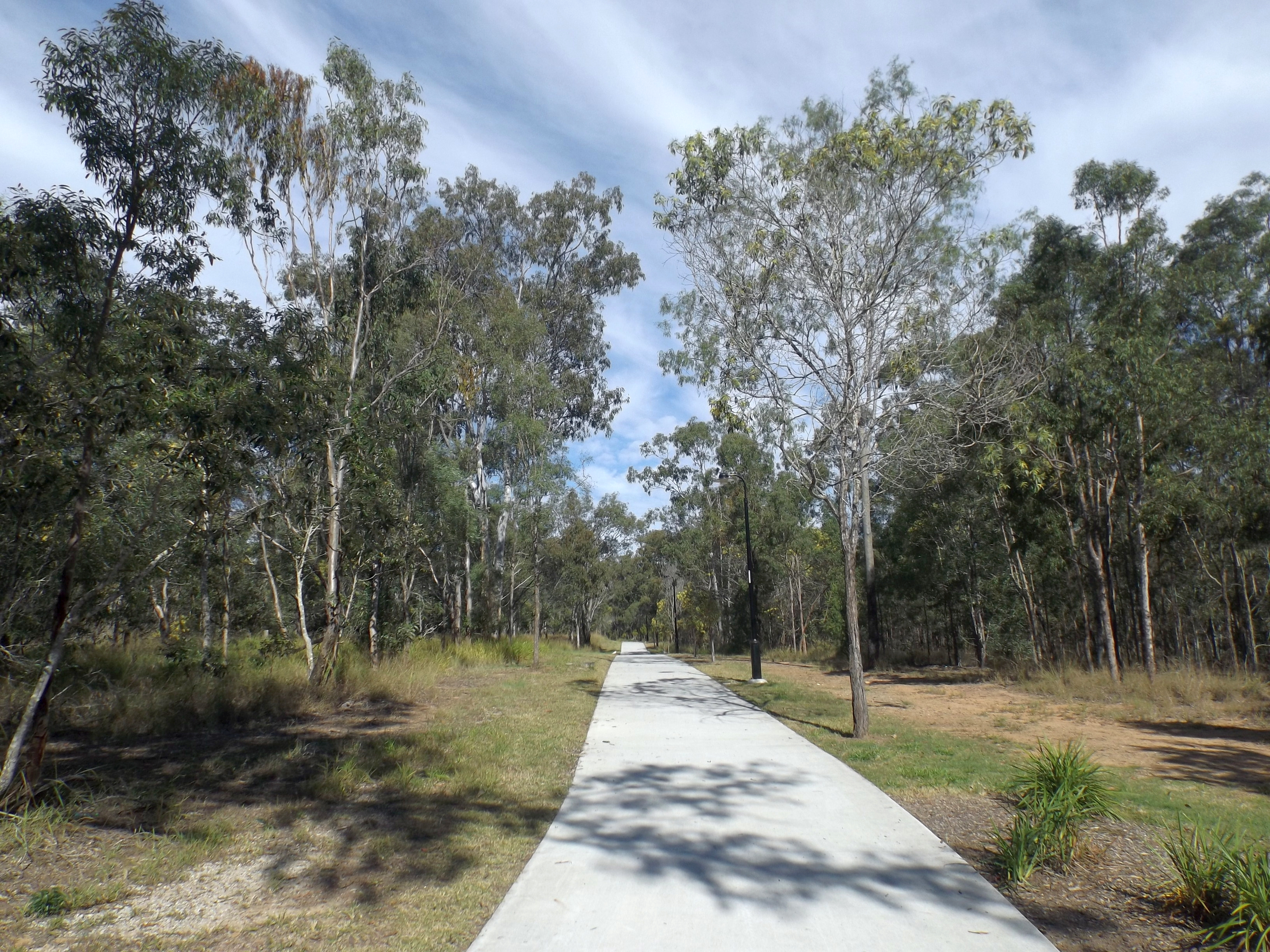
- Brassall Bikeway, 2015

- Coordinates: 27.6144°S 152.7261°E
- Population: 1,325 (2021 census)
  - Density: 368/km^{2} (953/sq mi)
- Postcode(s): 4305
- Area: 3.6 km^{2} (1.4 sq mi)
- Time zone: AEST (UTC+10:00)
- Location: 6.0 km (4 mi) W of Ipswich CBD; 49.1 km (31 mi) SW of Brisbane CBD
- LGA(s): City of Ipswich
- State electorate(s): Ipswich West
- Federal division(s): Blair
Suburbs around Wulkuraka:
Karrabin	Brassall	Coalfalls
Karrabin	Wulkuraka	Sadliers Crossing
Amberley	Amberley	Leichhardt

Wulkuraka is a western suburb of Ipswich in the City of Ipswich, Queensland, Australia. In the 2021 census, Wulkuraka had a population of 1,325 people.

== Geography ==
The Main Line railway enters the suburb from the east (Sadliers Crossing) and exits to the west (Karrabin). The suburb is served by Wulkuraka railway station (27.6136°S 152.7328°E). To the west of the railway station is the Wulkuraka Maintenance Centre (27.6132°S 152.7271°E) where Queensland Rail maintain their New Generation Rollingstock.

== History ==
The name Wulkuraka is from a Ugarapul word meaning either red flowering gum tree or plenty of kookaburras.

The Brisbane Valley railway line once joined the Main Line railway from the north at Wulkuraka.

== Demographics ==
In the 2016 census, Wulkuraka had a population of 1,234 people.

In the 2021 census, Wulkuraka had a population of 1,325 people.

== Heritage listings ==
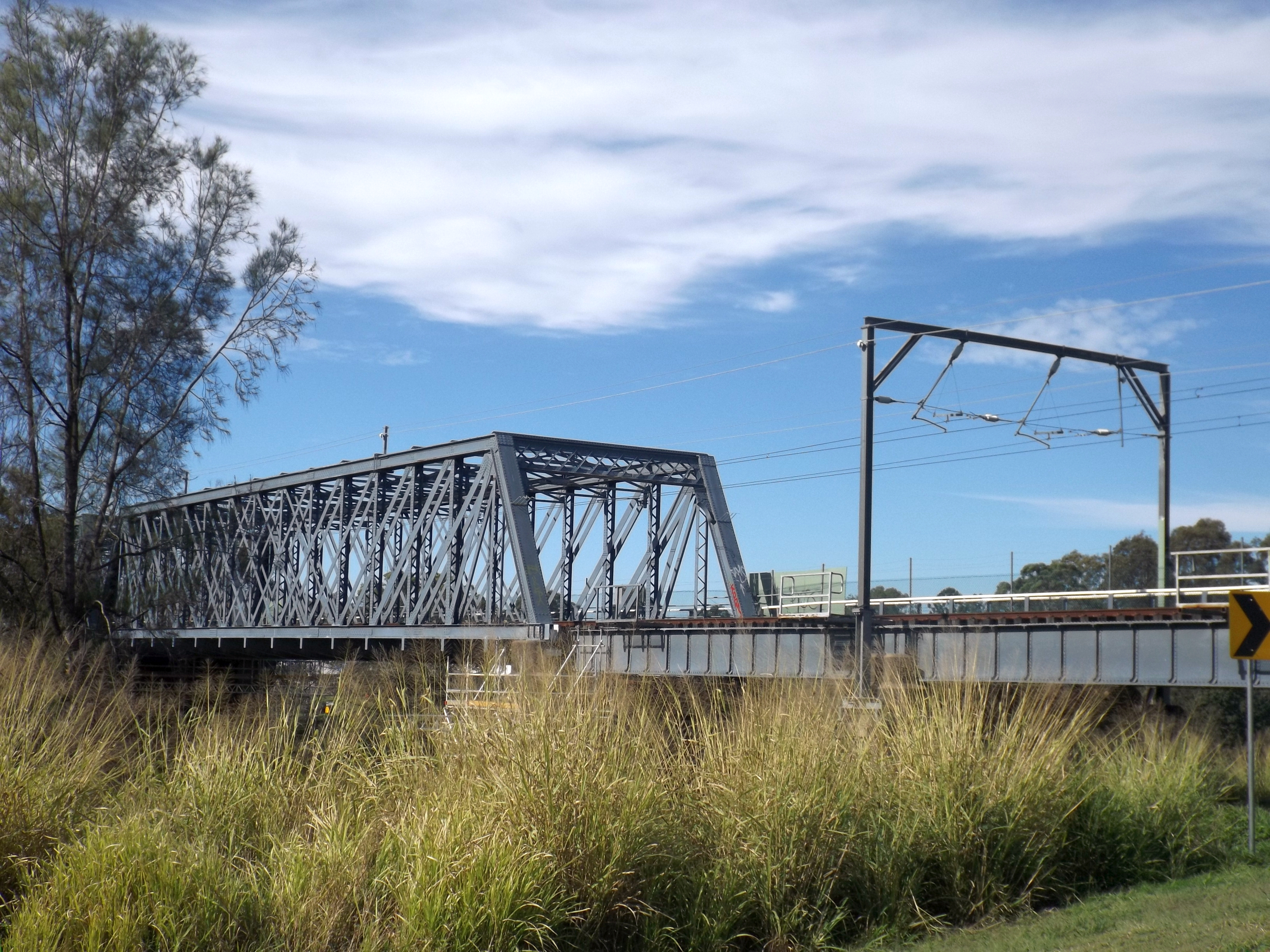
Sadliers Crossing Railway Bridge, 2015

Wulkuraka has a number of heritage-listed sites, including:

- The Sadliers Crossing Railway Bridge, over the Bremer River between Dixon Street, Wulkuraka, and Tallon Street, Sadliers Crossing (27.6145°S 152.7397°E)
- The Sandstone Railway Culvert (27.6054°S 152.7306°E)

== Education ==
There are no schools in Wulkuraka. The nearest government primary schools are Blair State School in neighbouring Sadliers Crossing to the east and Leichhardt State School in neighbouring Leichhardt to the south-east. The nearest government secondary schools are Ipswich State High School in neighbouring Brassall to the north and Bremer State High School in Ipswich CBD to the south-east.

== Amenities ==
There are a number of parks in the area:

- Grace Street Reserve (27.6115°S 152.7393°E)
- Gregory Street Reserve 1 (27.6057°S 152.7301°E)
- Gregory Street Reserve 2 (27.6027°S 152.7378°E)
- Palma Rosa Drive Park (27.6124°S 152.7380°E)
- Toongarra Road Reserve (27.6171°S 152.7267°E)
- Wulkuraka Park (27.6207°S 152.7269°E)

== Transport ==
Wulkuraka railway station provides Queensland Rail City network services to Rosewood, Ipswich and Brisbane via Ipswich.

== Attractions ==
Wulkuraka is one of the two end points for the Brisbane Valley Rail Trail. Although the trail does not commence at the Wulkuraka railway station, there is a connecting bike path from the railway station to the commencement of the trail.
