= Coalfalls, Queensland =

Coalfalls Ipswich, Queensland
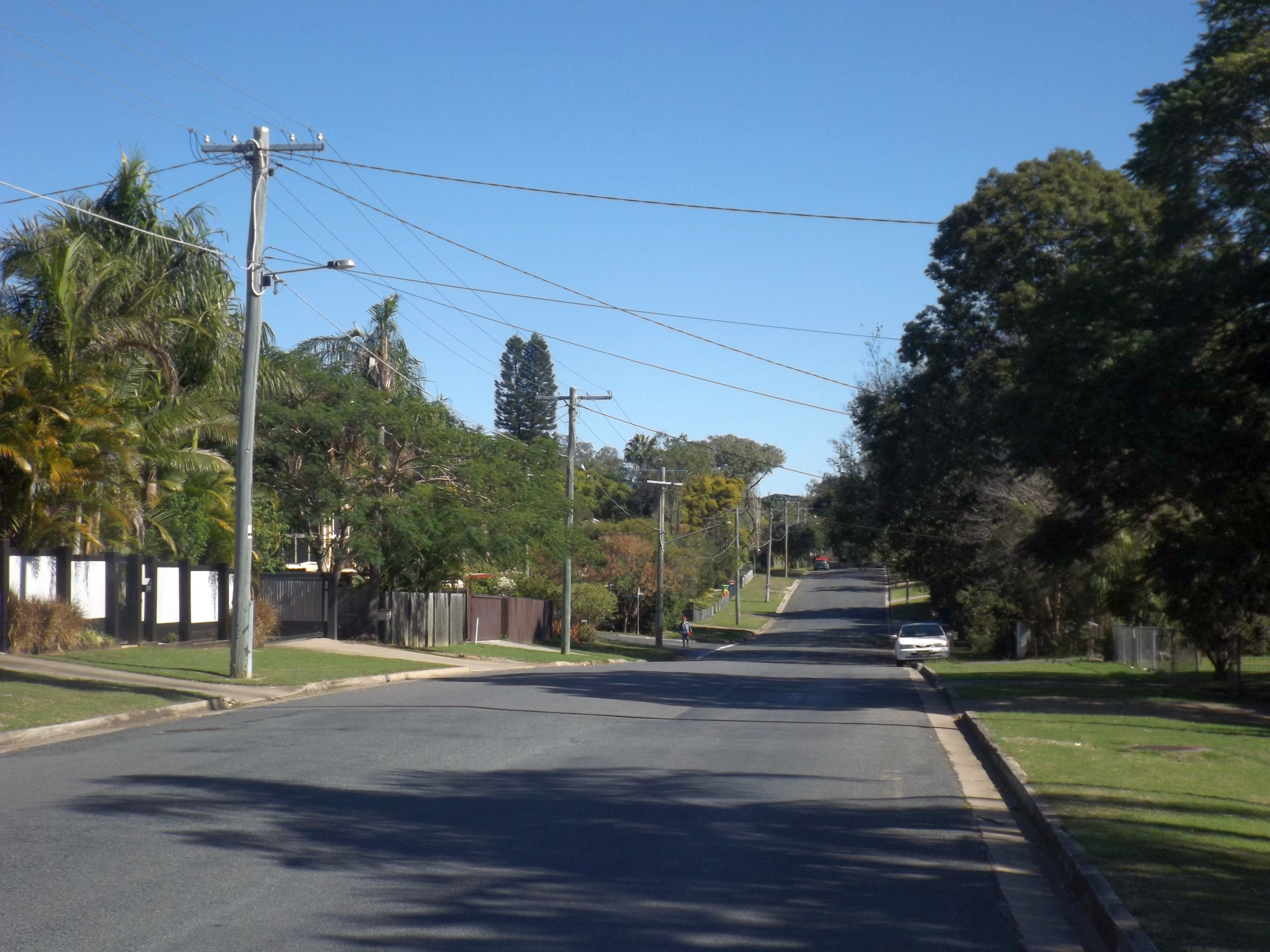
- William Street West, 2016

- Coordinates: 27.6063°S 152.7430°E
- Population: 898 (2021 census)
  - Density: 1,120/km^{2} (2,910/sq mi)
- Postcode(s): 4305
- Area: 0.8 km^{2} (0.3 sq mi)
- Time zone: AEST (UTC+10:00)
- Location: 2.5 km (2 mi) NW of Ipswich CBD; 44.9 km (28 mi) SW of Brisbane CBD
- LGA(s): City of Ipswich
- State electorate(s): Ipswich
- Federal division(s): Blair
Suburbs around Coalfalls:
Brassall	Brassall	Brassall
Wulkuraka	Coalfalls	Woodend
Wulkuraka	Sadliers Crossing	Woodend

Coalfalls is a suburb of Ipswich in the City of Ipswich, Queensland, Australia. In the 2021 census, Coalfalls had a population of 898 people.

== History ==
The origin of the suburb name comes from James Blair's house, Coalfalls, which in turn probably takes its name from the sighting of coal seams in this area, most notably along the banks of the Bremer River.

== Demographics ==
In the 2016 census, Coalfalls had a population of 943 people.

In the 2021 census, Coalfalls had a population of 898 people.

== Education ==
There are no schools in Coalfalls. The nearest government primary school is Blair State School in neighbouring Sadliers Crossing to the south. Then nearest government secondary school is Ipswich State High School in neighbouring Brassall to the north.
