= Johnny Hunt (rugby league) =

Australian rugby league footballer (1902–1984)

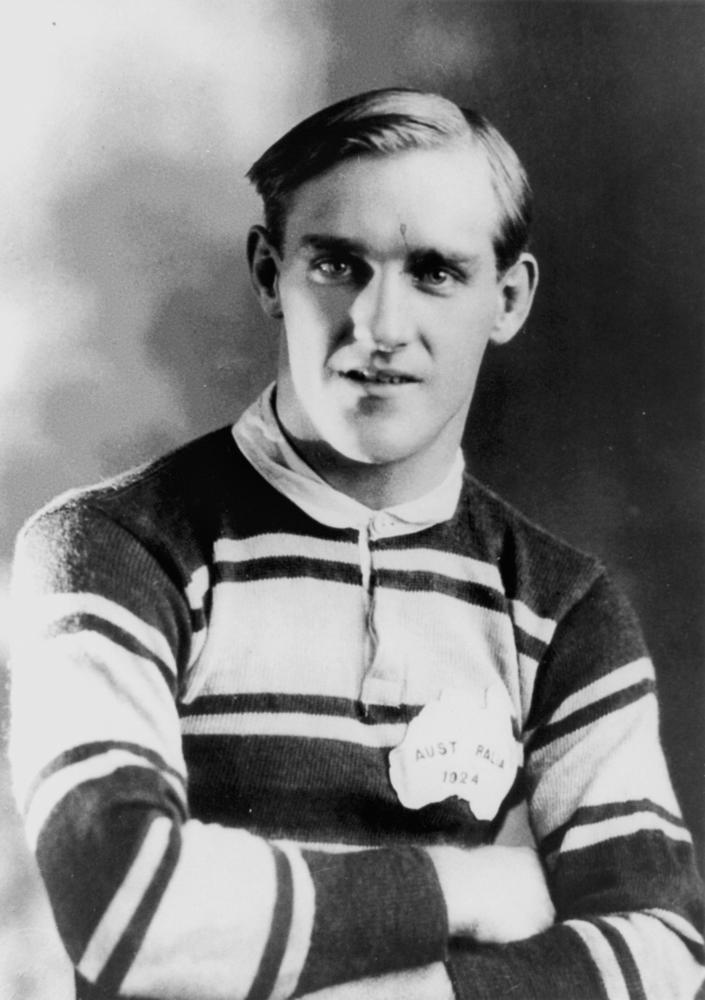

Personal information
- Full name: John Amos Hunt
- Born: 5 December 1902 Cooktown, Queensland, Australia
- Died: 28 November 1984 (aged 81)

Playing information
- Position: Five-eighth
Representative
Years	Team	Pld	T	G	FG	P
1923–25	Queensland	10	1	0	0	3
1924	Australia	2	0	0	0	0

John Amos Hunt (5 December 1902 – 28 November 1984) was an Australian rugby league footballer.

== Biography ==
Hunt was born in Cooktown in Far North Queensland and attended Ipswich Grammar School.

A five-eighth, Hunt was a lightly built player who had a strong defensive game, but lacked the same effectiveness in attack. He was based in Ipswich and represented Queensland between 1923 and 1925, playing seven interstate matches against New South Wales. His international career consisted of two Test matches against the touring 1924 British team. After a heavy loss in the opening fixture, Australian selectors changed both halfbacks, opting for Hunt and his Queensland teammate Duncan Thompson, with whom he had combined in the state's win against the tourists. He was the Kangaroos five-eighth for the remaining two fixtures, which included a win in Brisbane.

Hunt served as sports masters at both Ipswich Grammar School and Armidale Grammar School.
