= Sadliers Crossing Railway Bridge =

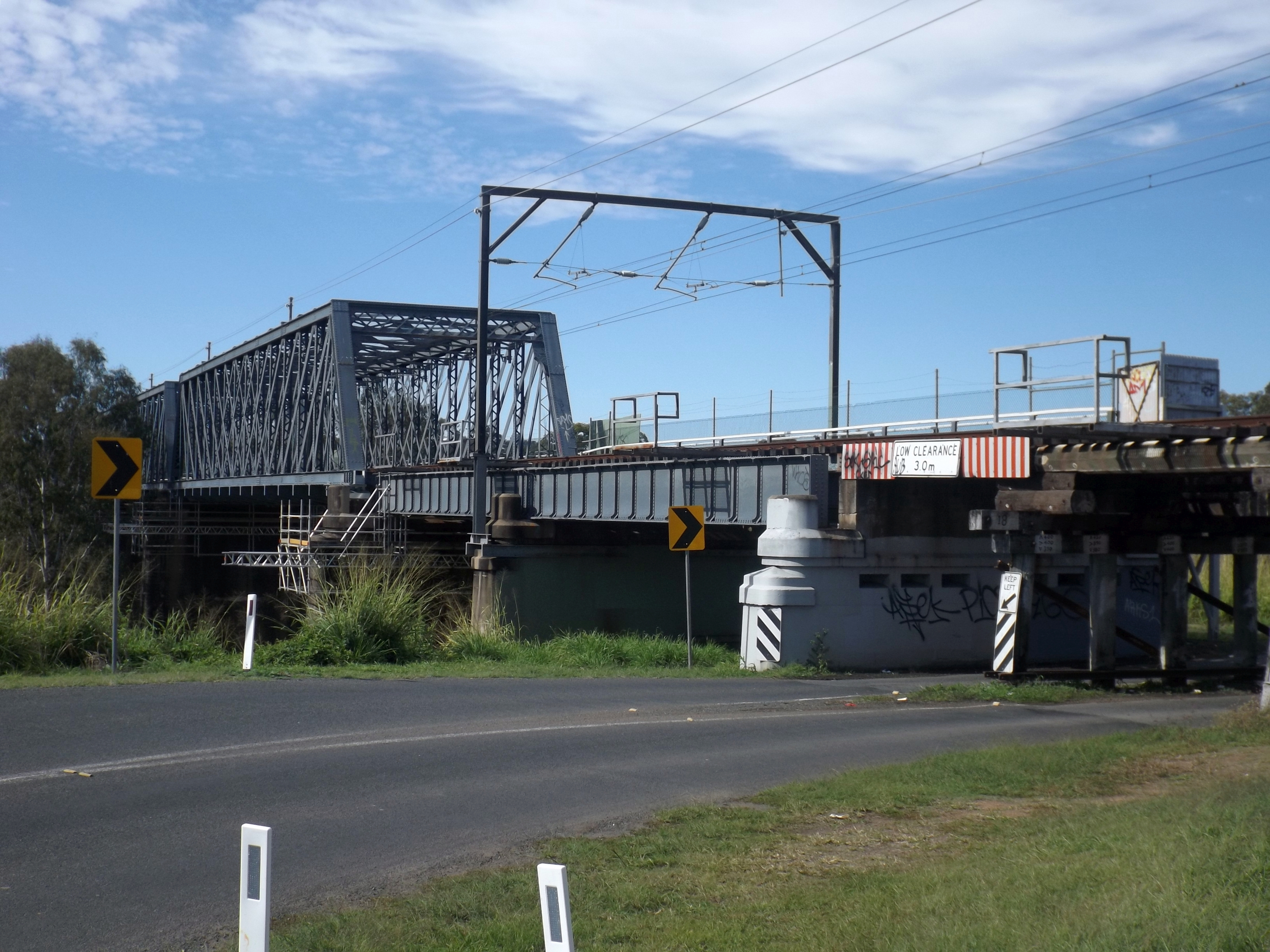
- Bridge in 2015

- Location within Queensland Location within Australia
- 27.6145°S 152.7397°E
- Location: over Bremer River between Tallon Street, Sadliers Crossing and Dixon Street, Wulkuraka, Queensland, Australia

Site notes
- Architect: Henry Charles Stanley

Queensland Heritage Register
- Official name: Sadliers Crossing Railway Bridge
- Type: state heritage (built)
- Designated: 13 November 2008
- Reference no.: 602569
- Significant period: 1902

Sadliers Crossing Railway Bridge is a heritage-listed railway bridge at over Bremer River between Tallon Street, Sadliers Crossing and Dixon Street, Wulkuraka, Queensland, Australia on the Main Line (this section is now the Ipswich and Rosewood railway line. It was added to the Queensland Heritage Register on 13 November 2008.

== History ==
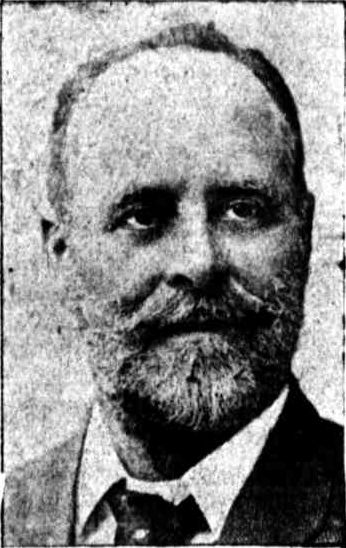
Henry Charles Stanley, 1914

The Sadliers Crossing Railway Bridge, which crosses east–west over the Bremer River between Tallon Street, Sadliers Crossing and Dixon Street, Wulkuraka, is a steel truss, concrete and timber bridge designed by Chief Engineer Henry Charles Stanley. Dating from 1902, it is the second bridge to cross the Bremer River at this site.

In the early 1860s the colonial Queensland Government decided to establish a railway as a means of developing the colony. It was argued that rail would reduce freight costs and save travel time for passengers considering the very poor state of Queensland roads. Priority was initially given to creating a rail link to the coast for the well-established and economically important Darling Downs pastoral region. The river port of Ipswich was chosen as the eastern terminus of the railway. Located at the head of navigation, at the intersection of routes to the Darling Downs and Upper Brisbane Valley, it was the major inland port serving these areas.

The Queensland Government began its railway network when it passed a Railways Act on 3 September 1863. This 1864 Railway Act authorized construction of the section from Ipswich to the Little Liverpool Range. 3 ft 6 in narrow gauge was chosen as Queensland's uniform gauge. On 3 January 1864 tenders closed for the first section of the railway from Ipswich to Bigge's Camp. The contract was subsequently awarded to the well known British railway builders Peto, Brassey and Betts whose price of £86,900 was the lowest of five tenders.

Construction of this 21-mile (34 km) section from Ipswich, via Walloon, to Bigge's Camp (later named Grandchester) at the foot of the Little Liverpool Range commenced in February 1864 and the line was opened in July 1865. This initial route from Ipswich differed from that followed by the present railway. Ipswich station was located immediately north of the present one, and the line proceeded due north, with an immediate crossing of the Bremer River to the area now occupied by the railway workshops. It then turned west around the north bank of the river, with bridges over minor creeks such as Mihi and Ironpot creeks. The Main Line was subsequently extended to Gatton (June 1866) and Toowoomba, via ascent of the Main Range, by May 1867.

The rail link from Ipswich to Grandchester remained a vital part of the Main Line but within the first decade of the operation of the line from Ipswich to Toowoomba it was decided to build a deviation near Ipswich. In 1875, the first 6 kilometres (3.7 mi) were replaced by a new line only half its length that crossed the Bremer River west of Ipswich at Sadlier's Crossing. This deviation was part of the extension of the line from Brisbane to Ipswich that opened in October 1874. The old line was retained as far as North Ipswich to serve the locomotive and carriage sheds and workshops.

Upgrading of the Main Line continued. In 1891–1892 the original 40 pound iron rails were replaced with harder wearing steel rails. Similarly all bridges on the Main Line were upgraded around the turn of the century to carry locomotives over twice the weight of the original ones. In 1899 it was decided to duplicate the rail track between Ipswich and Wulkuraka, to regrade the section between Ipswich and Rosewood and to raise the level of the Sadliers Crossing Rail Bridge so flood waters could not inundate it as happened in 1893. As a result of the disastrous 1893 floods, Whipple trusses, like that used on the Sadliers Crossing Railway Bridge, were preferred for railway bridges until the introduction of through Pratt trusses.

The new bridge was designed while Henry Charles Stanley was Chief Engineer for Railways (1892 to 1901). Stanley was an important early engineer in Queensland. Born and trained in Scotland, he was appointed to Queensland Railways in 1863. After working as chief engineer on several lines, Stanley became responsible for the whole of the colony's railway network in 1892. During the 1890s a number of large metal truss rail bridges were constructed to cross major streams making the connection of important towns and resources possible. In this way they were vital to the operation of the transport system and the development of the state as a whole. Many of these early bridges have since been replaced.

Tenders to construct the bridge were called in January 1900. The contract for the Sadliers Crossing Railway Bridge was awarded to J McCormick and Sons in February 1900. Material and plant for the new bridge were purchased in February 1900. The timber work for the bridge was completed and the 33-and-50-foot (10 and 15 m) steel plate girder spans were in position in 1901. The work was completed in March 1902 and the current bridge over the Bremer River at Sadliers Crossing came into usage. Its double track operated as two single tracks, one towards Rosewood and the other for the Brisbane Valley branch line.

The Sadliers Crossing Railway Bridge is a two span Whipple truss bridge with continuous rolled steel joists. It is the second longest span of its type in Queensland (45.7 metres (150 ft)), the longest being the former Burdekin River Rail Bridge at Macrossan. The Whipple truss was developed by Squire (CE) Whipple as a stronger version of the Pratt truss that was designed by Thomas and Caleb Pratt in 1844. The basic identifying features of the Pratt truss are the diagonal web members which form a V-shape. The centre section commonly has crossing diagonal members. The Pratt truss and its variations are the most common type of all trusses. One of these variations is the Whipple truss, which was patented in 1847, and is also known as the "Double-intersection Pratt" because the diagonal tension members cross two panels, while those on the Pratt cross one. The Whipple truss was popular with the railroads as it was stronger and more rigid than the Pratt.

Duplication and regrading of the track between Ipswich and Grandchester began in July 1914. When completed, the two single lines were converted into double track operation between Ipswich and Wulkuraka.

The bridge has not been substantially changed since its completion in 1902. In 1956 repairs were made to the bracing of No.1 truss. In 1965 plans were prepared for replacing the longitudinals supporting the track with transoms and this work was completed during the following year. In 1977 plans were prepared to replace the corbels on piers 9 and 17, and in 1994 the corner braces were removed to allow for the passage of over-height containers.

The bridge was known earlier as the Red Bridge because of its paintwork and accordingly there is still evidence of red oxide paintwork to steel members of the bridge.

Since the early 1960s there has been little construction of steel bridges by Queensland Rail. Once pre-stressed concrete bridge girders were proved adequate for rail use they became almost universal.

== Description ==
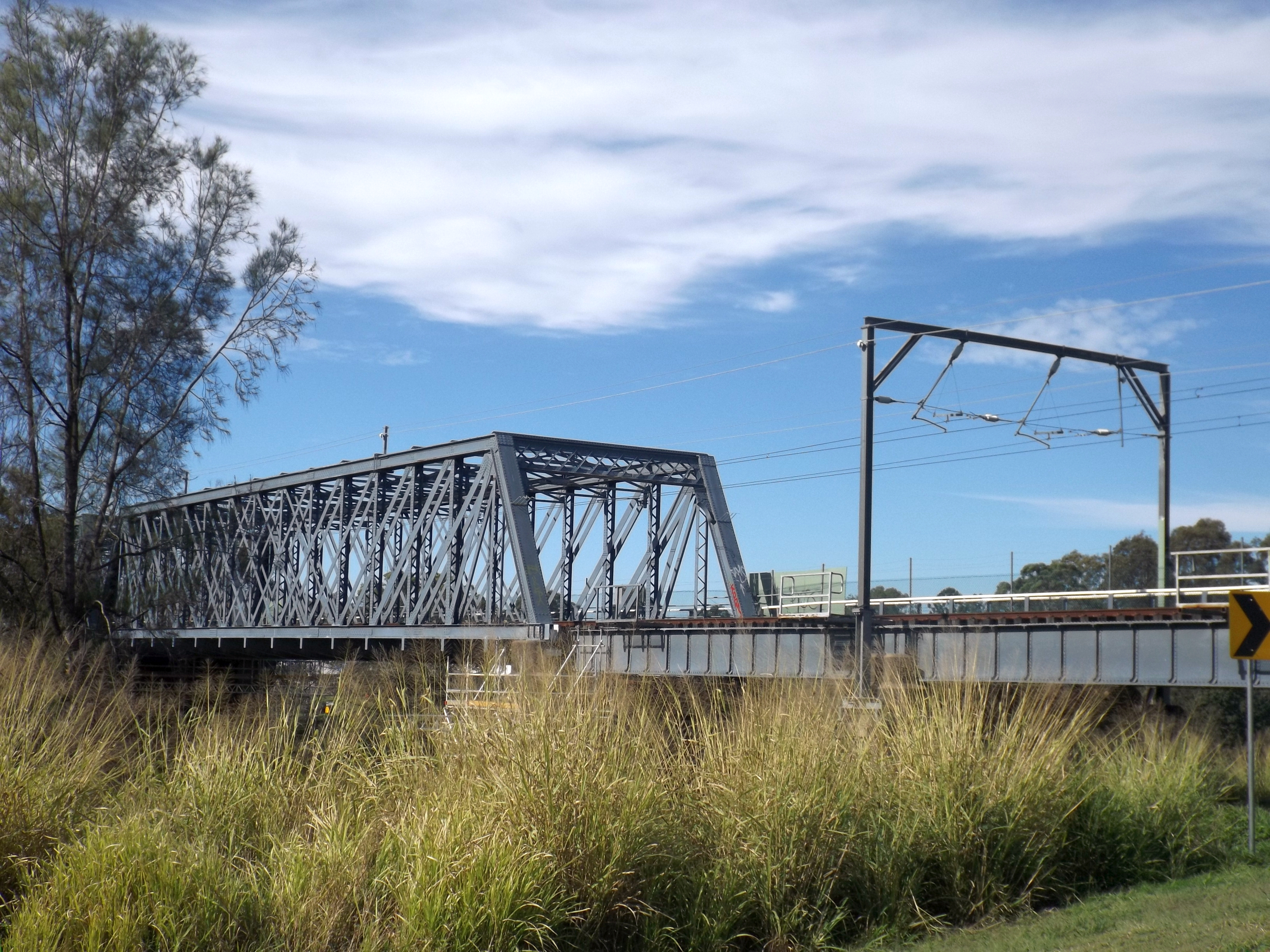
Bridge in 2015

This high-level steel, concrete and timber railway bridge over the Bremer River between Tallon Street, Sadliers Crossing and Dixon Street, Wulkuraka was built between 1900 and 1902. It is located approximately 25 miles 30 chains (40.8 km) from Roma Street railway station. Its total length is 412 feet (126 m) plus the timber trestles. It has long approaches to allow for flood flows on the Bremer River.

The outer approach spans of timber longitudinals are supported by common timber trestles, both braced and unbraced. The inner approach spans are of riveted continuous rolled steel joists and riveted deck-type continuous plate girders and underslung cross girders supported on concrete piers. The two mains spans are each of 150 feet (46 m). They are riveted 13-panel double-intersection through Pratt trusses (Whipple trusses) supported on concrete piers. The stylistic concrete piers are cement rendered. There are dressed stone cutwaters embedded in concrete to the upstream leading edges.

A cantilevered pedestrian footbridge is attached to the upstream side of the bridge. It has wrought iron stanchions, chain wire and timber top-rail balustrades on both sides. Timber access stairs and mid-landings are attached to each end of the bridge.

The rail line consists of straight double tracks.

== Heritage listing ==
Sadliers Crossing Railway Bridge was listed on the Queensland Heritage Register on 13 November 2008 having satisfied the following criteria.

The place is important in demonstrating the evolution or pattern of Queensland's history.

The Sadliers Crossing Railway Bridge, opened in 1902, is important in demonstrating the evolution of the railway network in Queensland. This rail network, established in the 1860s, was vital for the development of the colony through opening land for closer settlement and freighting produce and resources to Queensland's ports. From the 1890s the preferred design of large metal rail bridges to cross major waterways underwent several changes, to withstand flooding and to meet increased load requirements. Early bridges and track on the Main Line from Brisbane to the Darling Downs, which was one of Queensland's most important lines, were upgraded to accommodate heavier, more powerful engines as freight traffic and tonnage increased from the 1890s. Sadliers Crossing Bridge, replacing an 1875 bridge, was built as part of this upgrading.

The place demonstrates rare, uncommon or endangered aspects of Queensland's cultural heritage.

The Sadliers Crossing Railway Bridge is a rare surviving example of the use of riveted double-intersection through Pratt trusses (Whipple trusses), and is the second longest span of this type in Queensland. This bridge and the former Burdekin River Rail Bridge are the only parallel chord examples of the Whipple design extant in Queensland. A variant of the Whipple truss design, using hogback trusses, is used in the Albert Bridge, Indooroopilly and the Alexandra Railway Bridge, Rockhampton.

The cantilevered pedestrian footbridge and access stairs attached to the upstream spans is a rare example of its type and is still in use.

The place is important in demonstrating the principal characteristics of a particular class of cultural places.

The Sadliers Crossing Railway Bridge is a good example of a railway bridge designed by the Department of Railways and Public Works while Henry C Stanley was Chief Engineer of Queensland. The bridge is highly intact and provides important physical evidence of early twentieth century railway bridge design and construction in Queensland. Sadliers Crossing Railway Bridge demonstrates the evolution of the principal characteristics of steel railway bridges around the turn of the twentieth century, especially the change from the Pratt truss to the Whipple truss to the through Pratt truss, which increased the strength of the structure.
