= Sadliers Crossing, Queensland =

Sadliers Crossing Ipswich, Queensland
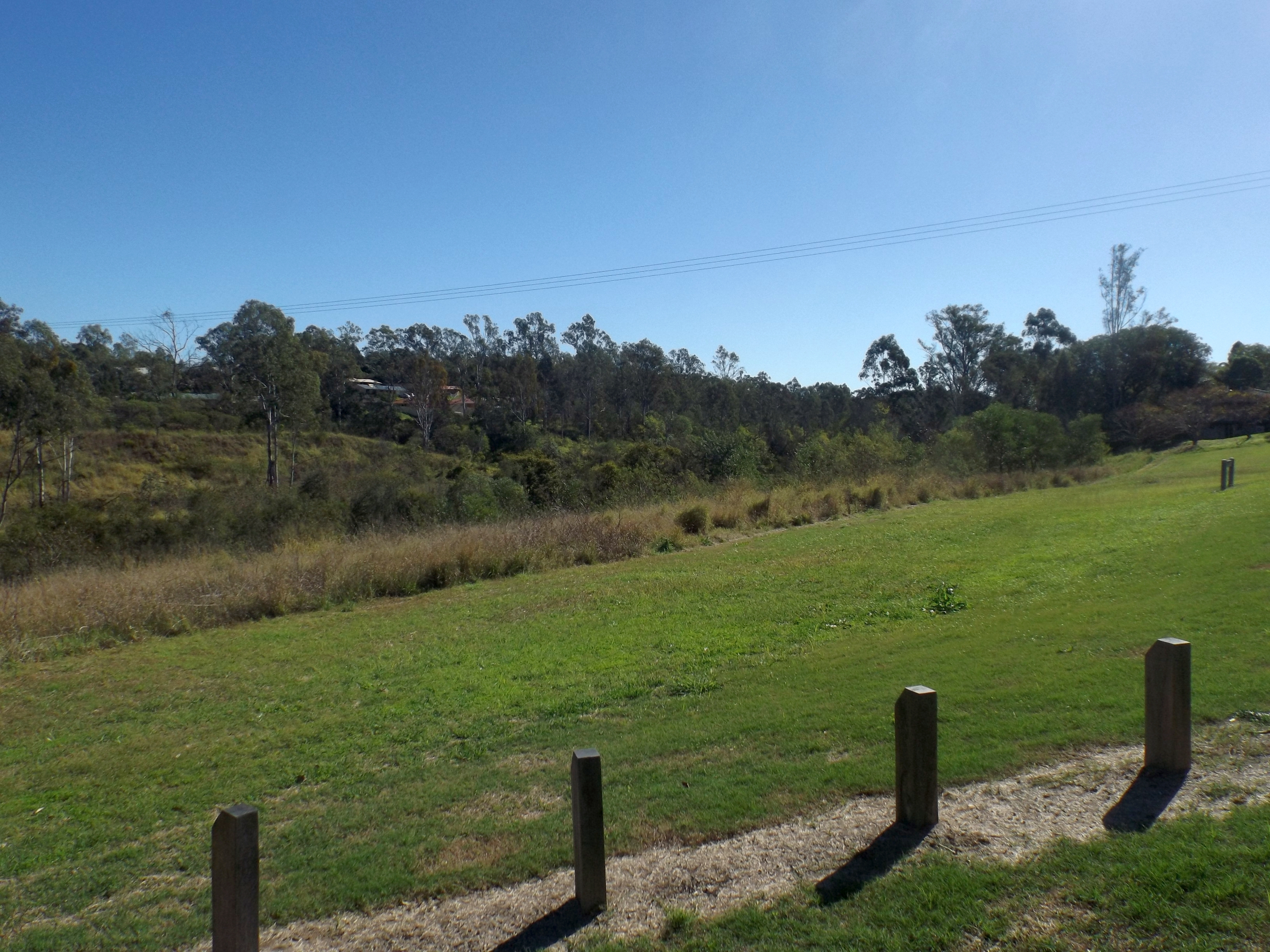
- Bremer River parkland, 2016

- Coordinates: 27.6141°S 152.7455°E
- Population: 1,358 (2021 census)
  - Density: 1,510/km^{2} (3,910/sq mi)
- Postcode(s): 4305
- Area: 0.9 km^{2} (0.3 sq mi)
- Time zone: AEST (UTC+10:00)
- Location: 1.8 km (1 mi) NW of Ipswich CBD; 47.4 km (29 mi) SW of Brisbane CBD
- LGA(s): City of Ipswich
- State electorate(s): Ipswich
- Federal division(s): Blair
Suburbs around Sadliers Crossing:
Wulkuraka	Coalfalls	Woodend
Wulkuraka	Sadliers Crossing	Woodend
Leichhardt	West Ipswich	Ipswich CBD

Sadliers Crossing is a suburb of Ipswich in the City of Ipswich, Queensland, Australia. In the 2021 census, Sadliers Crossing had a population of 1,358 people.

== Geography ==
The suburb is bounded to the west and south-west by the Bremer River.

The Main Line railway enters the suburb from the south-east (Ipswich CBD) and exits to the west (Wulkuraka) with Thomas Street railway station serving the suburb (27.6148°S 152.7455°E).

== History ==
The origin of the suburb name is from an early property owner Thomas Sadlier.

In 1901, Blair Methodist Church opened at 29 Burnett Street (27.6111°S 152.7488°E). Circa 1977 it became Blair Uniting Church. It closed circa 1980. As at February 2022, the church building is still extant but in private ownership.

Blair State School opened on 26 March 1917. Unlike most Queensland state schools which are named for the suburb/locality that they serve, Blair State School was named honour of Sir James Blair who was instrumental in the establishment of the school.

Mater Dei Catholic Church opened in a converted house in 1964.

== Demographics ==
In the 2016 census, Sadliers Crossing had a population of 1,366 people.

In the 2021 census, Sadliers Crossing had a population of 1,358 people.

== Heritage listings ==
Sadliers Crossing has a number of heritage-listed sites, including:

- over Bremer River between Tallon Street, Sadliers Crossing and Dixon Street, Wulkuraka: Sadliers Crossing Railway Bridge

== Education ==
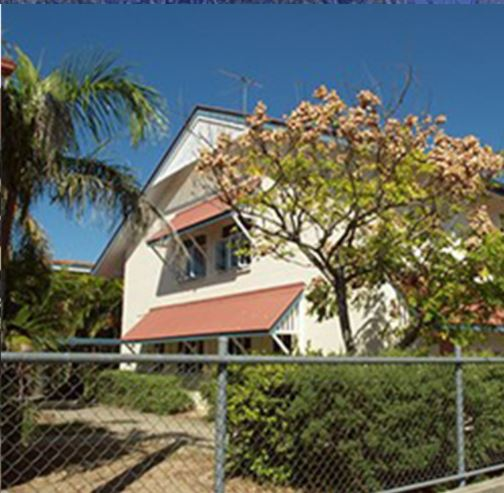
Blair State School, circa 2022

Blair State School is a government primary (Prep–6) school for boys and girls in Cribb Street (27.6120°S 152.7485°E). In 2018, the school had an enrolment of 391 students with 29 teachers (26 full-time equivalent) and 22 non-teaching staff (14 full-time equivalent). It includes a special education program.

There are no secondary schools in Sadliers Crossing. The nearest government secondary schools are Ipswich State High School in Brassall to the north and Bremer State High School in Ipswich CBD to the south-east.

== Amenities ==
Mater Dei Catholic Church is on the northern corner of Rowland Terrace and Ferrett Street in a converted house (27.6111°S 152.7464°E).

Plymouth Brethren Christian Church is at 5 Ferrett Street (27.6109°S 152.7470°E).

There are a number of parks in the area:

- Gladstone Road Reserve (27.6129°S 152.7403°E)
- Noel Bale Park (27.6160°S 152.7466°E)
- Reals Park (27.6121°S 152.7471°E)
- Stephenson Street Park (27.6113°S 152.7418°E)
- Thomas Street Reserve (27.6176°S 152.7449°E)

== Transport ==
Thomas Street Railway Station provides Queensland Rail City network services to Rosewood, Ipswich and Brisbane via Ipswich.
