= Leichhardt, Queensland =

Leichhardt
- Suburb
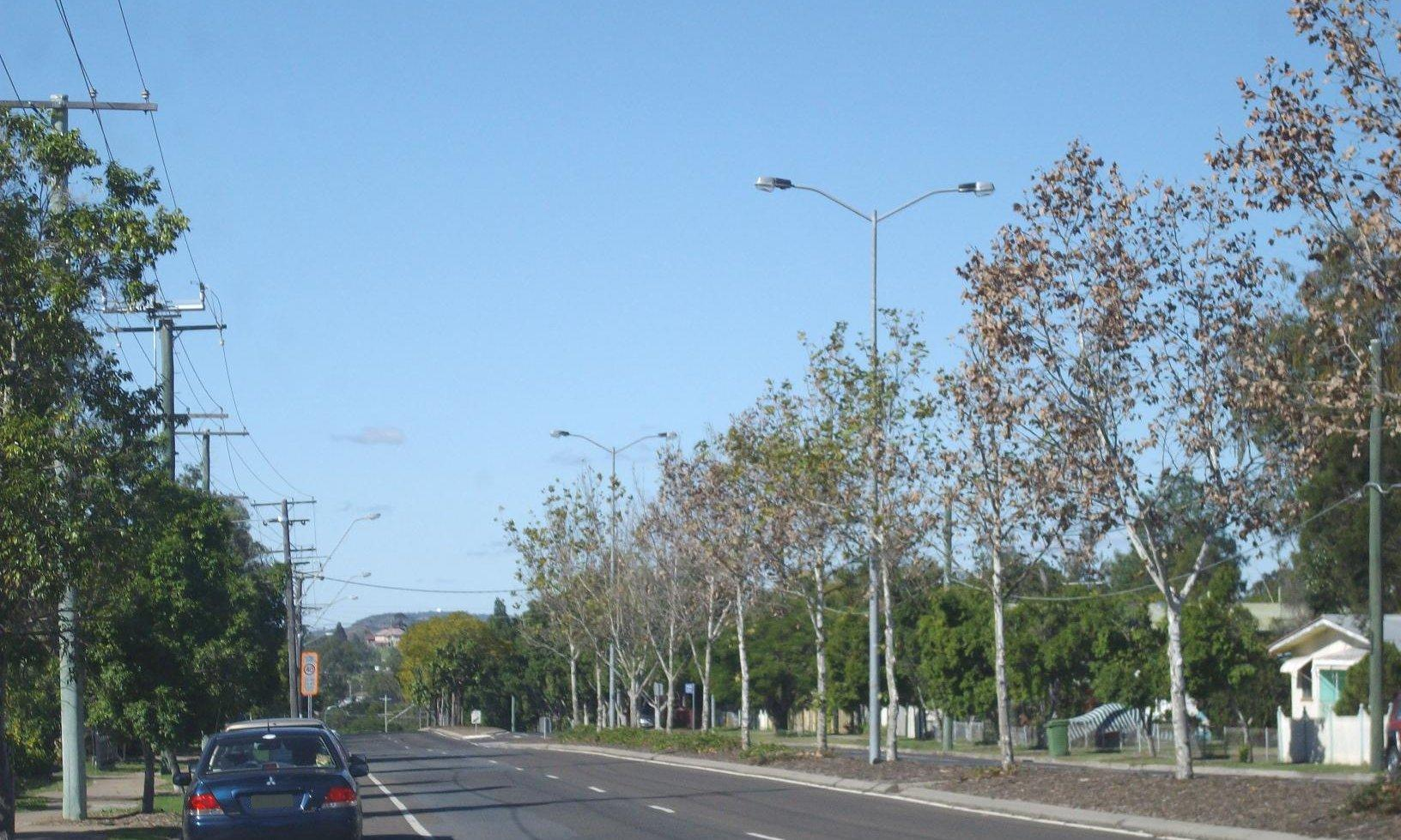

- Coordinates: 27.6230°S 152.7336°E
- Country: Australia
- State: Queensland
- City: Ipswich
- LGA: City of Ipswich
- Location: 3.4 km (2.1 mi) SW of Ipswich CBD; 47.0 km (29.2 mi) SW of Brisbane CBD

Government
  - State electorate: Ipswich West
  - Federal division: Blair

Area
  - Total: 2.9 km^{2} (1.1 sq mi)

Population
  - Total: 4,471 (SAL 2021)
- Time zone: UTC+10:00 (AEST)
- Postcode: 4305
Suburbs around Leichhardt
Wulkuraka	Wulkuraka	Sadliers Crossing
Wulkuraka	Leichhardt	West Ipswich
Amberley	One Mile	Churchill

Leichhardt is a suburb of Ipswich in the City of Ipswich, Queensland, Australia. In the 2021 census, Leichhardt had a population of 4,471 people.

== Geography ==
The suburb is bounded to the south-west by the Bremer River, to the south by the Old Toowoomba Road, and to the north-east by the Bremer River again.

Ipswich Golf Course occupies 54 hectares (130 acres) in the south-west of the suburb adjacent to the river.

== History ==
The Ipswich City Golf Club opened in 1897 as a membership-based organisation. It went into receivership in 2013 and was purchased by Terry Morris (founder of Sirromet Wines) and Dean Merrell.

St Mark's Anglican Church opened circa 1935. Its closure on 15 November 1998 by Assistant Bishop Ray Smith.

The suburb name was assigned following a request by local residents to the City of Ipswich in 1953. It is named after Friedrich Wilhelm Ludwig Leichhardt, an explorer and naturalist from Prussia (now known as Germany). He led major expeditions throughout Australia.

Leichhardt Methodist Church was officially opened on Saturday 5 September 1953 by Reverend John Egerton Jacob. The church building was not new but the relocated Methodist Church from Birkwood (now within Coleyville / Warrill View) which opened 77 years earlier in 1876 but the congregation had subsequently declined. With the amalgamation of the Methodist Church into the Uniting Church in Australia in 1977, it became Leichhardt Uniting Church. It was demolished in 2018. It was at 13 Chubb Street (27.6305°S 152.7384°E), now within the suburb boundaries of One Mile.

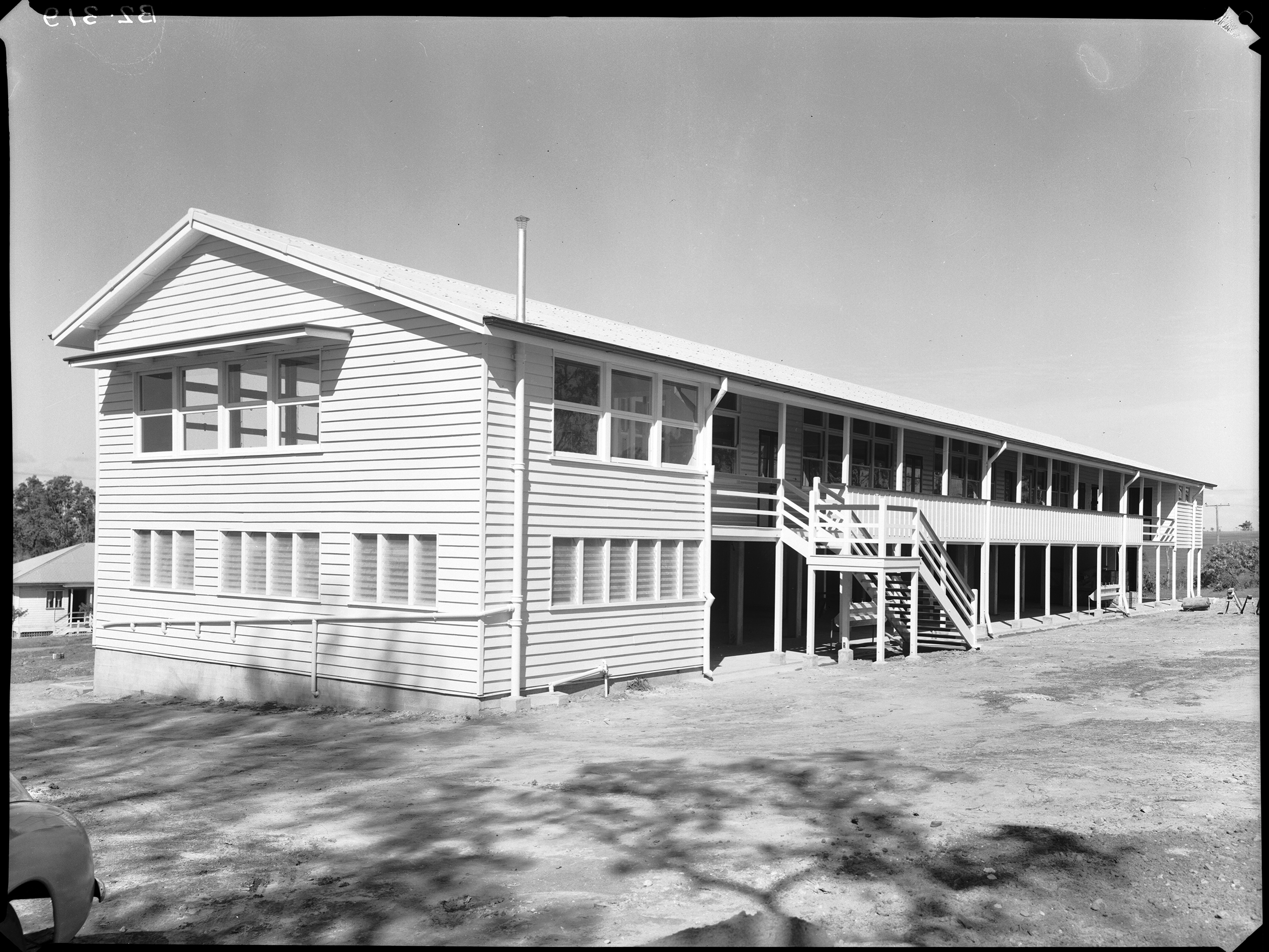
Leichhardt State School, 1956

Leichhardt State School opened on 1 August 1956.

Immaculate Heart of Mary Catholic Church opened in 1958 at 22 Old Toowoomba Road; it is now within the suburb boundaries of neighbouring One Mile.

Immaculate Heart of Mary Catholic Primary School opened on 23 January 1967; it is now within the suburb boundaries of neighbouring One Mile.

== Demographics ==
In the 2016 census, Leichhardt had a population of 3,912 people. The unemployment rate of Leichhardt was 17.1%, in comparison to the Australian unemployment rate of 6.9%.

In the 2021 census, Leichhardt had a population of 4,471 people. The unemployment rate of Leichhardt was 14.3%, in comparison to the Australian unemployment rate of 5.1%.

== Education ==
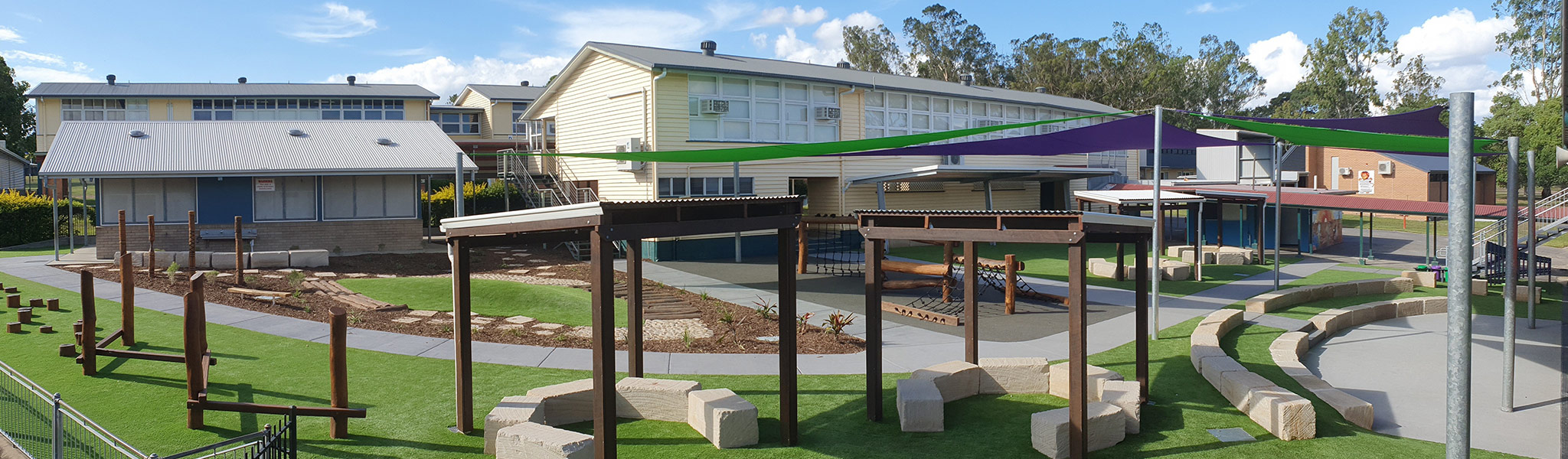
Leichhardt State School, 2023

Leichhardt State School is a government primary (Prep–6) school for boys and girls at 72 Samford Road (27.6249°S 152.7369°E). In 2018, the school had an enrolment of 346 students with 26 teachers (23 full-time equivalent) and 29 non-teaching staff (17 full-time equivalent). It includes a special education program.

There are no secondary schools in Leichhardt. The nearest government secondary schools are Bremer State High School in Ipswich CBD to the south-east and Ipswich State High School in Brassall to the north.

== Amenities ==
The Ipswich Golf Club is an 18-hole golf course. The par-72 championship course was designed by Wayne Grady. The clubhouse has a pro-shop, changing rooms, bistro and bar.
