= Eric Francis (rugby union) =

Australian rugby union player

- Born: Eric Francis; 17 June 1894 Ipswich, Queensland
- Died: 25 August 1983 Spring Hill, Queensland, Australia

Rugby union career
- Position: wing
International career
Years	Team	Apps	(Points)
1914	Wallabies	2	(0)

Eric Francis (17 June 1894 – 25 August 1983) was a rugby union player who represented Australia.

Francis, a wing, was born in Ipswich, Queensland and claimed a total of 2 international rugby caps for Australia.
