= Ipswich Grammar School =

Location
- Darling Street; Ipswich, Queensland, 4305; Australia; 27°36′46″S 152°45′7″E

Information
- Type: Independent, single-sex, day & boarding
- Motto: Latin: Labore et Honore (Hard Work and with Honour)
- Denomination: Non-denominational
- Established: 1863
- Principal: Adam Forsyth (Headmaster)
- Employees: ~130
- Enrolment: ~1,300 (P–12)
- Colours: Red & white (sports); Maroon & white (academic)
- Alumni: IGS Old Boys
- Website: www.ipswichgrammar.com

Ipswich Grammar School is an independent, non-denominational, day and boarding school for boys, located in Ipswich, a local government region of Brisbane on the Bremer River in South East Queensland, Australia. The school is situated on Grammar School Hill, with its Great Hall occupying the crown of the hill. The original Ipswich Grammar School Buildings are listed on the Queensland Heritage Register.

Founded in 1863, Ipswich Grammar was the first secondary school established in Queensland under the Grammar Schools Act 1860, making it Queensland's oldest boys' school and one of Australia's oldest schools. Today the school operates a P to 12 educational model, offering preparatory, primary, and secondary education to over 1,300 students, including approximately 150 boarders from Australia and throughout the world.

Ipswich Grammar School is a founding member of the Great Public Schools Association of Queensland Inc., an association of nine of the state's most prominent schools, formed in 1918. Ipswich Grammar is also a member of the Australian Boarding Schools Association (ABSA), Junior School Heads Association of Australia (JSHAA), Independent Schools Queensland (AISQ), and Association of Heads of Independent Schools of Australia (AHISA).

== History ==
=== Background ===
Ipswich Grammar School was the first of ten grammar schools established under the Grammar Schools Act, passed by Queensland's first parliament in 1860. The Act allowed for the establishment of a grammar school in any town where £1000 could be raised locally. At the time of the Act, there was a push for the new system of education in Queensland to be free of denominationalism. The Grammar Schools Act was passed to reflect this.

Despite these intentions of the legislation, it was the Roman Catholic Bishop Quinn who, by mid-1861, had raised sufficient funds to open Grammar Schools in both Brisbane and Ipswich. Amidst an outcry from the Protestant section of the community, Bishop Quinn was informed by the Executive Council of Queensland that the intention of the legislation was to establish Grammar Schools on strictly non-sectarian principles. This decision may have been influenced by the fact that not a single member of either House of the Legislature in Queensland at the time was a Roman Catholic.

=== Establishment ===
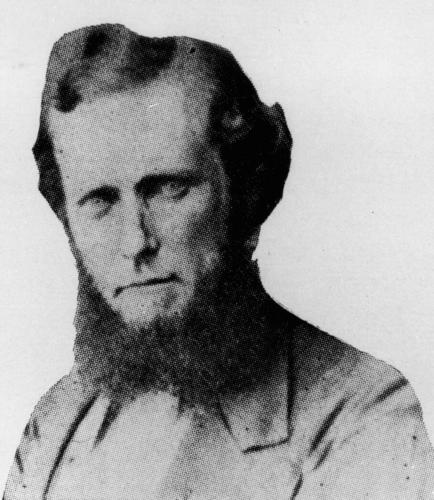
Stuart Hawthorne, the first Headmaster of Ipswich Grammar School, c. 1865

Unperturbed, the Roman Catholic community in Ipswich raised the full amount of £1000. On 20 August 1861, the first meeting concerning the establishment of a Grammar School in Ipswich took place. Around 200 people attended.

It seems that despite the drive of the Roman Catholic's to establish a school under their denomination, the majority of people did not support the establishment of a school where one religion would predominate. Trouble erupted when a resolution was put forward that members of each religious denomination be appointed to a committee to make preparations for the new Grammar School. A member of the Roman Catholic group suggested that they would withdraw their funds if they did not get their own way – and the meeting ended in turmoil, with a brawl taking place. In the week following this first meeting, newspapers reported clashes in the streets of Ipswich between Roman Catholics and the Protestants.

On 27 August 1861, one week after the initial meeting, a second meeting regarding the Grammar School was held at the Ipswich Court House. Around 600 people attended. A local newspaper, The Ipswich Herald and General Advertiser, records it as "the largest and noisiest ever held in Ipswich". At one stage, police were called to settle another brawl that had broken out between the various religious groups.

It was in this turbulent spirit that a resolution for the establishment of IGS was passed, by 281 votes to 199. The Roman Catholic group promptly withdrew their financial support, and it would be March 1862 before the community of Ipswich would raise the £1000 required.

The first Board of Trustees, elected on 25 March 1862, called for plans and specifications to be submitted for the new school building. Architect Benjamin Backhouse made the only submission, and after a small problem with his initial design was overcome (he had forgotten to make provision for toilets), the plan was accepted. The original building (known as the Great Hall) was designed in a revival gothic style, and it was constructed by contractors John Ferguson and David McLaughlin.

=== Early years ===
An artist's impression of Ipswich Grammar School, sitting atop Grammar School Hill, Ipswich, in 1865

IGS was opened on 25 September 1863 by Sir George Ferguson Bowen, Governor of Queensland. The School opened with 16 students, 4 staff and the inaugural Headmaster, Stuart Hawthorne, a graduate of the University of Sydney.

The first curriculum reflected the traditional Grammar School education – it included Latin and Greek classics, mathematics, the various branches of liberal English education and, when circumstances permitted, teaching of the German and French languages. Student numbers fluctuated during the initial years, but settled between 70 and 80 in the 1870s.

By the start of the 20th century, 36 students had graduated from IGS to various universities around Australia. In this time, a number of other Queensland grammar schools had opened, some under the auspices of the Grammar Schools Act – in the immediate region, these included Brisbane Grammar School in 1868, Gregory Terrace in 1875, Toowoomba Grammar School in 1877 and Nudgee College in 1891.

When competition with Brisbane Grammar commenced, Australian rules football was the chosen code. The first competitive match between the two schools was played in 1870 under these rules – the outcome was a draw. These early games were exceptionally long – the match between IGS and Brisbane Grammar in 1876 commenced at 10.30am and ended at 2.30pm, at which time IGS had scored 6 goals to Brisbane Grammar's nil.

Incidentally, rugby union was adopted as the official code in 1887, only to be replaced by rugby league when the Queensland Great Public Schools (GPS) system commenced in 1918. In 1928, the code was again changed to rugby union, where it has since stayed, although due to popular demand, Aussie Rules was reintroduced in 1995 as part of the Independent Schools Australian Rules Football Competition.

Competitions between the Grammar Schools in these years became more frequent. In 1878, the first Inter-Grammar School sports held for Athletics were held, with IGS prevailing over Brisbane Grammar School and Toowoomba Grammar School. IGS won two successive grammar school rowing regattas in 1891 and 1892, but floods in Ipswich destroyed the School's rowing shed and equipment and IGS has not competed in rowing competition since.

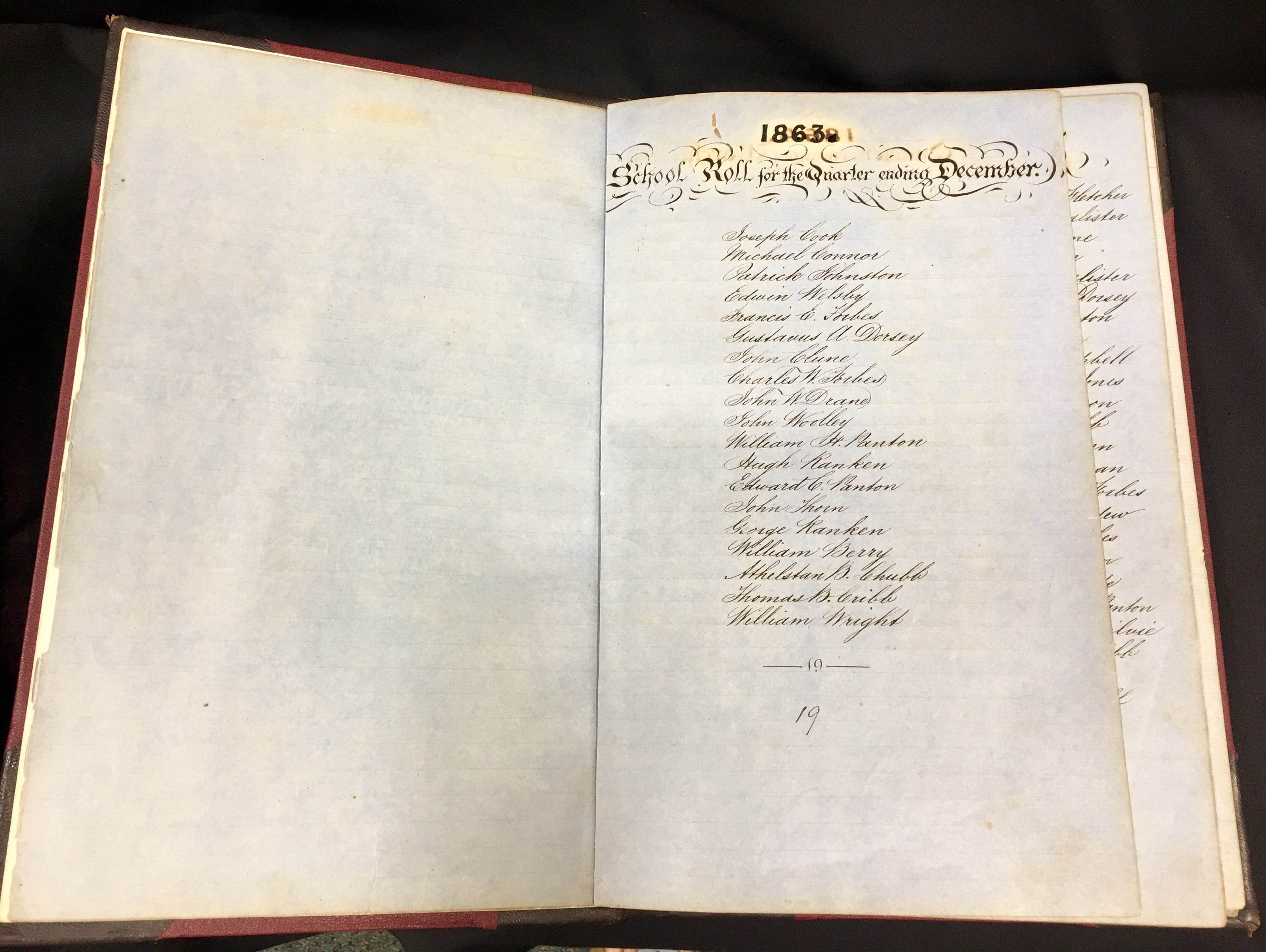
Cover of Ipswich Grammar School Roll Book 1863 - 1907. Held at Ipswich Grammar School, Ipswich, Queensland.

The first tennis match between IGS and Brisbane Grammar was played in 1893, with IGS emerging victorious. IGS also claimed victory in the first cricket match between the two schools – but the actual scores have been lost to time.

=== Middle years ===
Early photograph of the Ipswich Grammar School, including (on the left) the Great Hall

By the time of the golden jubilee of IGS in 1913, attended by Sir William MacGregor, Governor of Queensland, the School had erected an Honour Board, new boarding facilities and a Science Block, leading to the teaching of physics and chemistry in a laboratory. The Chelmsford Cup series (the precursor to the GPS system, named after then Governor of Queensland, The Lord Chelmsford) was established in 1907 for competition between the existing Grammar Schools, and the inauguration of the Old Boys Association followed the next year. The University of Queensland was opened in Brisbane in 1909, improving student attendance.

The Chelmsford Cup series existed alongside the new Great Public Schools, or GPS, system from 1918 to 1938, at which time it was discontinued in favour of GPS. In 1925, the first sports ground at IGS was opened. The first game to be played on this field was a football match between past and present students – the result was a 3-all draw. IGS added swimming and tennis facilities and a second sports ground in the 1930s.

IGS produced three Rhodes scholars between 1922 and 1924, and had produced five prior to World War II. The connection of electricity and addition of four new classroom blocks in the 1920s meant that by 1930, student numbers had risen to around 200.

=== Post-World War II ===
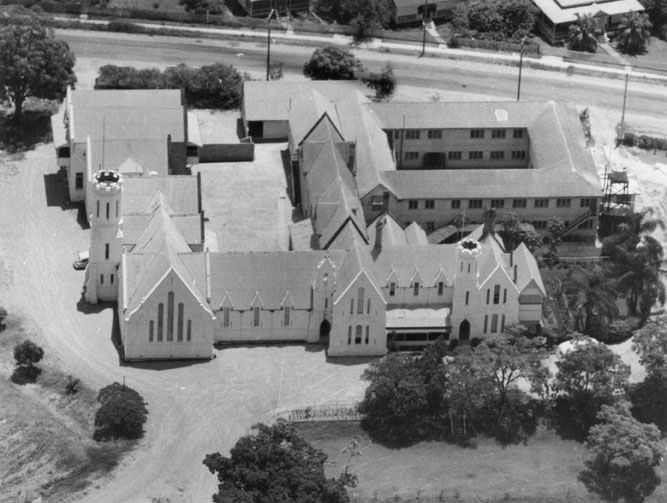
Aerial photograph of Ipswich Grammar School in the 1970s

IGS grew notably following World War II – additional boarding facilities, in the form of the Murray Hancock Memorial Block, were created in 1946; the War Memorial Library was opened in 1947; and Preparatory School buildings were added in 1955. The large central classroom block, which was constructed at a cost of over £100,000, was opened in 1961 – and is still used prominently today.

More growth was to follow, with the Manual Training facilities and an on-campus hospital added in 1967, biology block opened in 1970, the R.G. Edmondson Memorial Open Air Theatre and the Gilmore Wilson Memorial School of Music opened and dedicated in 1977 and the Physical Education and Sports Complex opened in 1980.

During the 1980s, the school constructed manual arts and science facilities, automated its library and other resources, purchased the 250-acre (1.0 km^{2}) historic Woodlands estate in the nearby suburb of Marburg and signed a cooperation agreement with its sister school in Japan, Gifu Daiichi High School. The decade was to end in sadness, however, as Headmaster Alan Ladley died suddenly on the final school day of 1989.

The 1990s saw IGS adopt a number of commercial activities – a common theme through a number of the GPS Schools. The Grammar Park Housing Estate was started in 1991 in a nearby suburb of Ipswich, and later the Grammar Park Sports Fields and a hospitality complex were added. IGS expanded its teaching into year 7 (traditionally a primary school year level in Queensland) in 1994. Years 4 to 6 were added later, and in 2006 the school began operating services for pre-school to year 3.

In 2020, a new STEM building was added to facilitate the schools growing population of students in engineering, biology, physics and more. Costing around $10 million and consisting of three storeys, the building include a lecture theatre, multiple science and engineering laboraties and other learning spaces, designated "study areas", and a balcony providing panoramic views of Ipswich and Western Brisbane. More recently, the school constructed a Precinct of the Arts, developing the structure of the school's former Science Building.

== Headmasters ==
Period	Details
1863–1868	Stuart Hawthorne (School House)
1869–1875	John McCrae
1875–1900	Donald Cameron (School House)
1901–1907	Charles A. Flint
1907–1915	Bertram G. Lawrance (School House)
1915–1945	Richard A. Kerr (School House)
1946–1951	William G. Henderson (School House)
1952–1953	R.J. (Jim) Diamond
1953–1958	Charles E. Olsen
1958	Walter M. Douglas
1959–1968	Basil V. Heath
1969–1989	Alan M. Ladley (School House)
1990–2001	Igor Lapa
2001–2010	Denis Fredericksen
2011–2015	Robert Henderson
2016–2024	Richard Morrison
2024–	Dr Adam Forsyth

== Campus ==
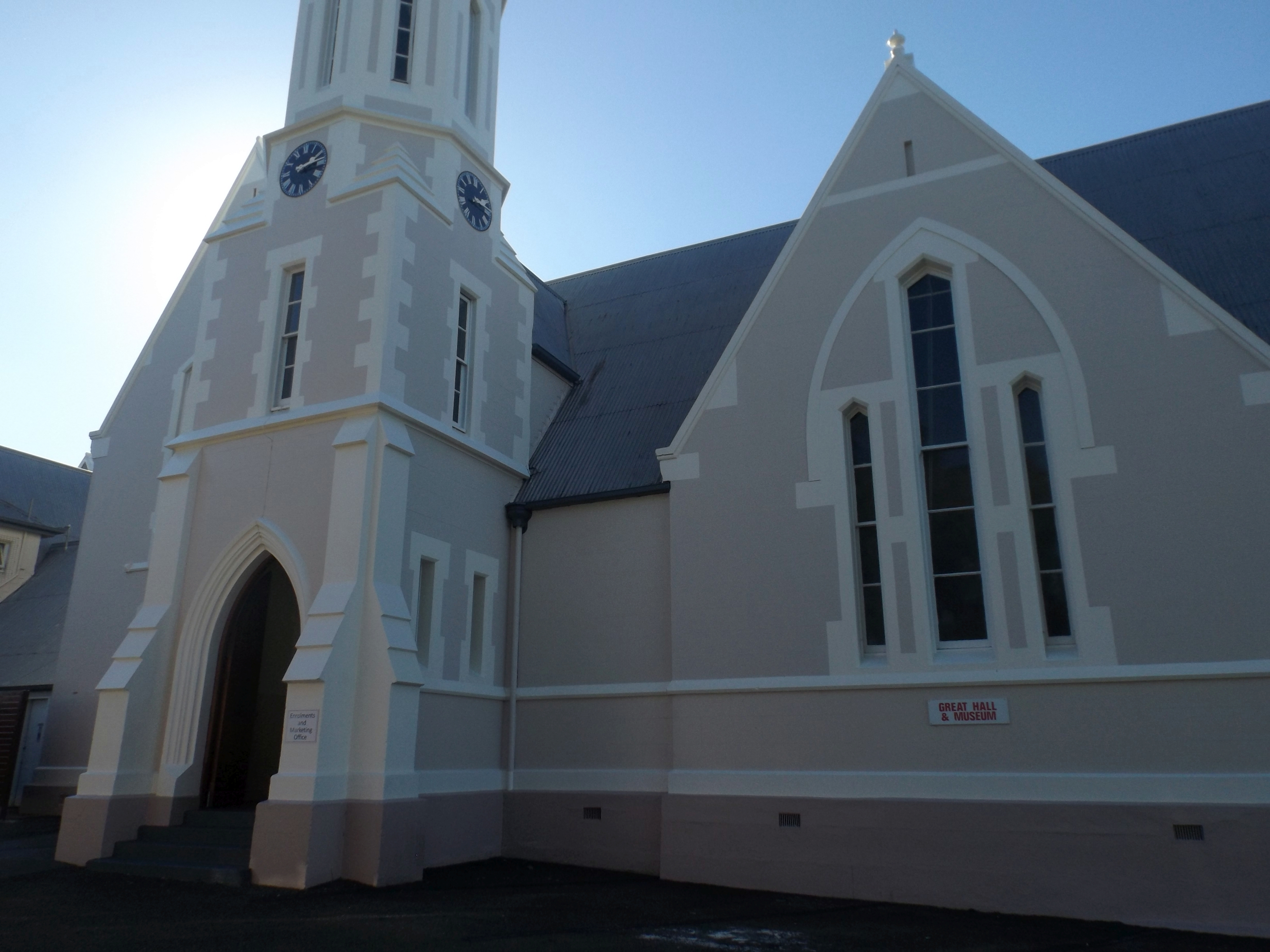
Great Hall, 2016

The original school buildings from the 1860s sit on the crown of Grammar School Hill, with the central structure now known as the 'Great Hall'. These buildings are listed by the National Trust of Australia. The school grounds have undergone significant transformation in recent years, most notably the introduction of the Igor Lapa Junior School. Now included within the Igor Lapa Junior School is a full indoor sand volleyball pit, basketball hoops, and cricket pitches. Further extensions have been made to the junior school due to the new attendance of prep to grade three.

Due to this expansion of the Prep buildings over the Tennis courts, additional Courts were built at the school's Brassall sports complex. This land is usually used for cross country, cricket, rugby, and soccer. Eight new tennis courts were constructed at the Brassall grounds.

== GPS membership ==
IGS is a founding member of the Great Public Schools Association of Queensland, better known as the GPS Association, which was established in 1918. Today, nine schools participate in the GPS Association. These are Ipswich Grammar, Nudgee College, Gregory Terrace, Brisbane Grammar School, Toowoomba Grammar School, Anglican Church Grammar School, Brisbane State High School, The Southport School and Brisbane Boys' College. The schools engage in 13 formal GPS activities, with a premiership awarded annually for each activity.

Ipswich Grammar's GPS sporting success belies its status as among the smallest of the GPS schools. Known for the strength of its athletics program, IGS has claimed more GPS track and field premierships than any other school. IGS regularly ranks among the strongest athletics schools in Australia. In 2024, it ranked first in the "intermediate" age category and third in the "junior" category, among all Australian schools at the Australian All-Schools Athletics Championships. IGS students and alumni have represented Australia in Commonwealth Games and Olympic Games. They have also represented national teams in virtually every sport, most prominently in basketball, cricket, rugby union, rugby league, soccer, swimming, and water polo.

== House system ==
As with many Australian independent schools, Ipswich Grammar School utilises a house system, whereby students are members of one of multiple houses that compete within one another at intra-school sporting events. Ipswich Grammar has six houses named after its longest serving Headmasters. These are Hawthorne (yellow), Cameron (sky blue), Lawrence (red), Kerr (green), Henderson (black), and Ladley (royal blue). Incoming students are allocated to a house and generally remain in that house during their time at the school. Senior year students assist teachers in managing the students during inter-house events.

== Notable alumni ==
Alumni of Ipswich Grammar School are known as 'Old Boys'

== Museum and archive ==
Ipswich Grammar School has a Museum and Archive, established to preserve the history of the school, students and faculty. The Museum operates onsite in The Great Hall and is open to the public during school terms.

== See also ==
- List of schools in Queensland
- List of boarding schools
