= Kathleen M. Butler =

Australian engineer (1891–1972)

Kathleen Butler
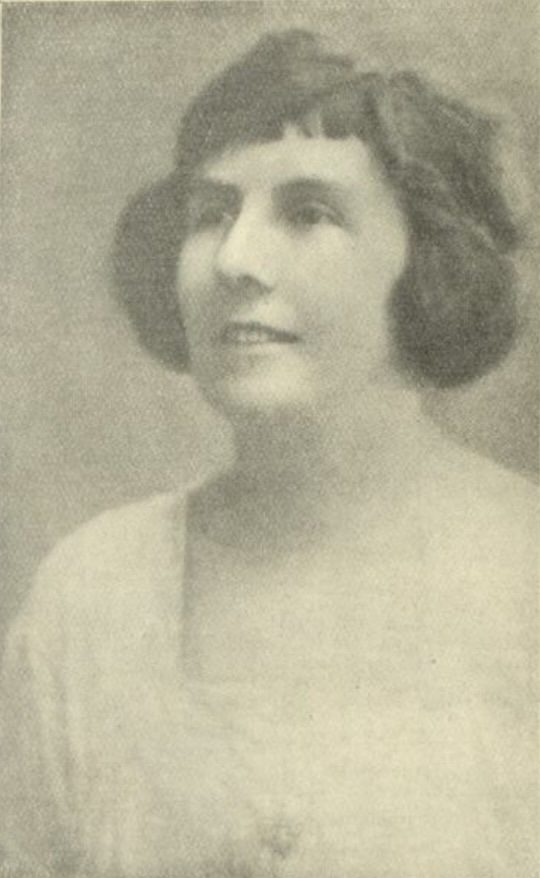
- Butler in 1925
- Born: Kathleen Muriel Butler; 27 February 1891; Lithgow New South Wales
- Died: 19 July 1972 (aged 81)
- Occupation: Engineer
- Known for: Sydney Harbour Bridge
- Spouse: Maurice Hagarty (m. 1927)
- Children: 1

Kathleen M. Butler (27 February 1891 – 19 July 1972) was nicknamed the "Godmother of Sydney Harbour Bridge" and also known as the "Bridge Girl". As the first person appointed to Chief Engineer J. J. C. Bradfield's team, as his Confidential Secretary (a role which today would be called a technical adviser or project planner), she managed the international tendering process and oversaw the development of the technical plans, travelling to London in 1924 to supervise the project in the offices of Dornan's, the company which won the tender. At the time it was built, Sydney Harbour Bridge was the largest arch bridge in the world, with the build expected to take six years to complete. Her unusual role garnered much interest in the press in Australia and Britain.

== Early life ==
Kathleen Muriel Butler was born on 27 February 1891 in Lithgow, New South Wales, one of seven children. She grew up in the Blue Mountains and attended school in Mount Victoria, where her father, William Henry Butler, was stationmaster, and she later studied at Mount St Mary's Convent in Katoomba. Butler later attributed her engineering ability to her mother Annie Butler (née Gaffney) "who was remarkably clever at drawing plans of houses and supervising buildings".

== Career ==
On leaving school, sometime before 1910, Butler was appointed as a clerk and typist to W. F. Burrow, chief officer of the New South Wales (NSW) government testing office in Lithgow, set up to monitor the quality of output from the local ironworks. At this point she had no technical qualifications. On 10 December 1910 (aged 19) she was transferred to the NSW Department of Public Works in Sydney.

She joined the staff of the Chief Engineer of metropolitan railway construction, when the branch was established in 1912 to deal with Sydney's transit problems. This was the beginning of her long professional association with J. J. C. Bradfield, working as his Confidential Secretary. During the following decade she "mastered all sorts of intricate technical matters of engineering" to become a highly skilled technical project manager.

Bradfield initially favoured building a bridge with a cantilever overpass, without piers, between Dawes Point and McMahons Point. In 1916 the Legislative Assembly passed the Bill for the construction of a cantilever bridge, although the Legislative Council rejected the legislation on the grounds that money would be better used for the war effort. Bradfield persevered and with his team developed full specifications and a scheme to finance the construction of a cantilever bridge. After going overseas in 1921 to investigate tenders for the project, Bradfield came to believe that tenders should be called for both cantilever and arch designs. The necessary Act was finally passed in 1922 — the Sydney Harbour Bridge Act No. 28 — for the construction of a high-level cantilever or arch bridge across Sydney Harbour by connecting Dawes Point with Milson's Point. The Act also provided for the construction of the bridge and its approaches and also included the construction of electric railway lines. Butler had prepared the notes submitted with the Sydney Harbour Bridge Act No. 28 when it was introduced in the Assembly in 1921 and "these Notes materially assisting the passage of the Bill through the Assembly and Council" although there was a delay

When the Harbour Bridge Act was passed by the NSW Parliament in 1922, Kathleen Butler was the first member of staff appointed to the team by its leader, Chief Engineer, Dr J. J. C. Bradfield. Her job title was Confidential Secretary to the Chief Engineer, which disguised her significant role on the project. (Today her job title would be technical adviser or senior project manager). She was described in the press as the "God-Mother of the Bridge".

She was "appointed on her merits" and was involved in all aspects of the project planning and acted as the lynchpin for information flow, as she had mastered all sorts of intricate technical matters of engineering. When the scheme for the Sydney Harbour Bridge and the underground railway system was finally agreed on by the New South Wales Parliament, she worked on the preparation of the specifications for engineering the bridge.

Butler wrote numerous articles about the development of Sydney Harbour Bridge between 1922 and 1927, in effect acting as the PR for Bradfield's office. Bound copies of these articles were later deposited in the Mitchell Library in Sydney.

In March 1922, Bradfield left Australia and travelled abroad, undertaking research into possible bridge tender proposals on the instructions of the government. It has been suggested that as the Sydney Harbour Bridge Act No. 28 had been delayed due to a change in political power due to an election, the new government considered cancelling the project and intended to ask Bradfield to stay in New York for consultation and recall. Butler knew Bradfield's itinerary and telegraphed him to warn him that a formal telegram was on its way to him and that he should be elsewhere. The formal telegraph never reached Bradfield as he left for London.

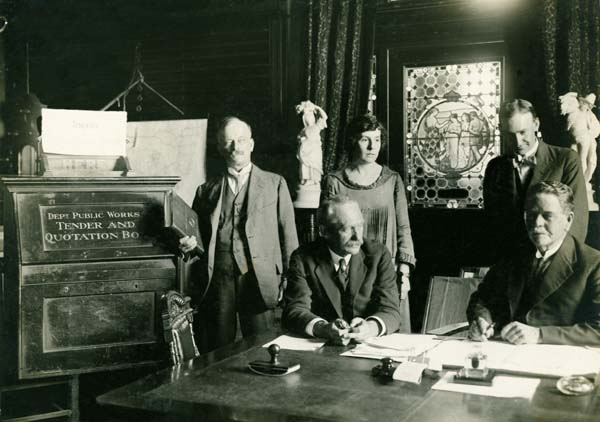
Opening of Tenders for the Sydney Harbour Bridge, 1924

In Bradfield's absence, Butler managed the complex correspondence with the international companies tendering for the project in 1922. She was present at all interviews with the tenderers, and was present at the meeting to open the tenders at noon on 16 January 1924 and when the contract was signed on 24 March. Butler was named in the photograph which appeared widely in the press, alongside T. B. Cooper (Under-Secretary for Works and father of cricketer Bryce Cooper), R. T. Ball (Minister for Works and Railways), Bradfield and a Mr Swift (private secretary to the Minister for Works).

Butler, Bradfield and the project engineer Gordon Stuckey worked on the Sydney Harbour Bridge: report on tenders for seven days a week from 16 January to sign off on 16 February 1924 with Bradfield thanking Butler and Stuckey for having "cheerfully worked incessantly" to complete the work in good time. The report recommended appointing the British firm Messrs. Dorman, Long & Co. Butler later told the Evening Standard that "We were working on the report six weeks, night and day, because the tenderers were all waiting to hear their fate, and we wanted to let them get back to America, England and Canada as soon as possible. I think I know that report and the specification off by heart. Those were exciting days. I was the only woman present in the Minister's room when the tenders were opened. It was a most exciting moment."

Once the British firm Dorman Long were appointed on 26 February 1924, Butler lost no time in publicising the specifics of their plans, writing an indepth newspaper article about "Our Harbour Arch Bridge: The World's Record" in The Sydney Mail on 12 March 1924. By late April, Butler was on board ship, the RMS Ormonde, headed for London with three engineers to set up the offices and run the London end of the project, based in the Dorman Long offices. The Australasian claimed that "Miss Butler is in charge of the visiting party, on £500 a year..." a very significant salary and much increased from her 1916 typist's salary of £110 p.a. when she first joined the NSW Department of Public Works in Sydney. Her tasks included "attending the most difficult and technical questions and technical questions in regard to the contract, and dealing with a mass of correspondence."

Dorothy Donaldson Buchanan, the first woman in Britain to gain qualification as a civil engineer, was working on the bridge project in the same Dorman Long offices at this time.

Once Bradfield joined the team in London they also visited the Dorman workshops in Middlesbrough to inspect the work.

Butler received enthusiastic press attention in London and at home in Australia for her work. Her arrival in London featured in both the suffrage magazine The Vote and in several gossip columns which complemented her expertise and noted her interest in surfing, tennis and dancing. As The Echo put it in 1924, "She is an advocate of hard work leavened with an equal part of healthy recreation". The Woman Engineer journal of the Women's Engineering Society (WES) described Butler as a Pioneer and "the first Australian woman to take a practical interest in Engineering enterprise". She was invited to events by WES and kept in touch with members for several years following her visit.

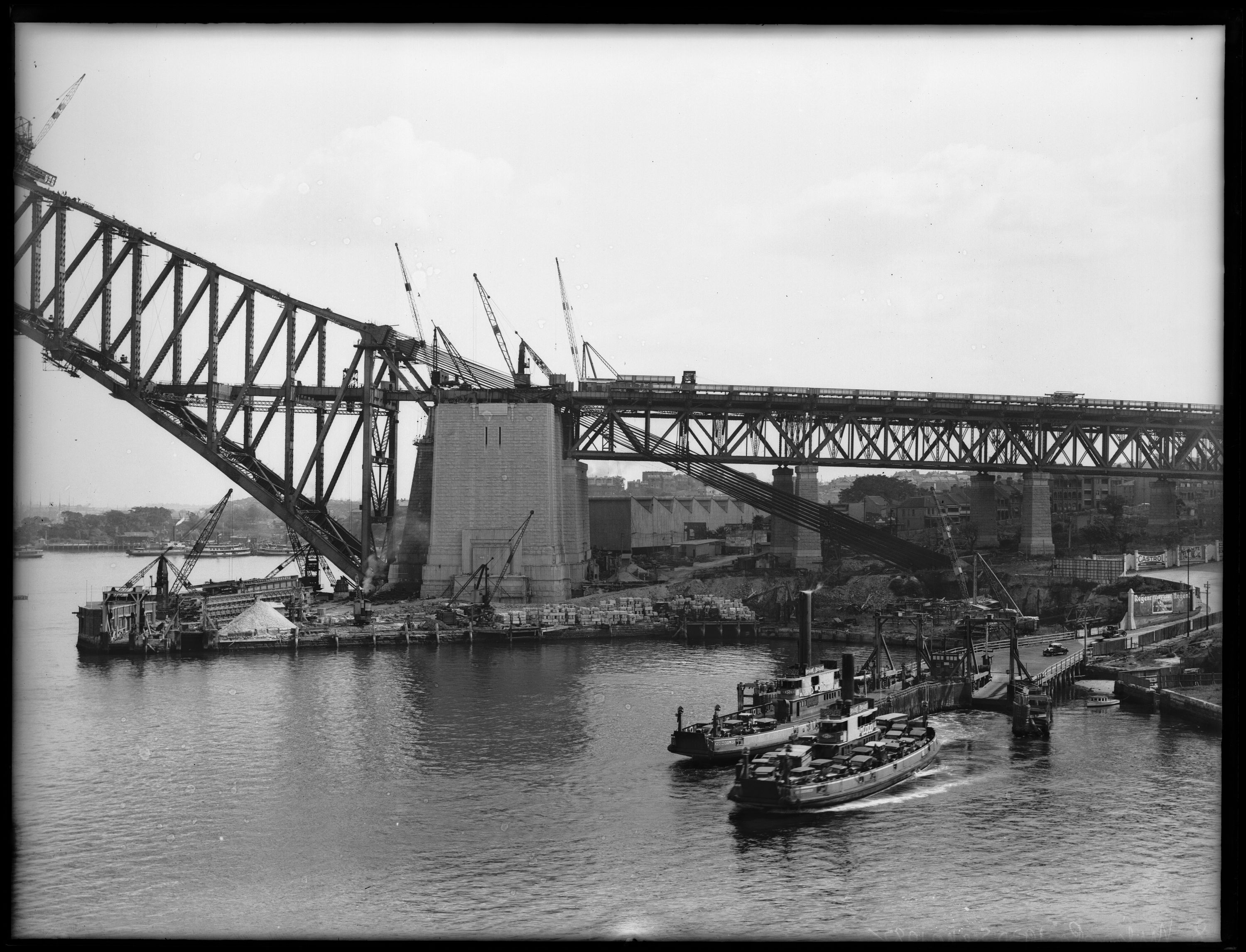
Sydney Harbour Bridge under construction.jpg

Kathleen Butler left Britain on 15 November 1924, sailing from Southampton on the SS Berengaria in the company of Bradfield. In January 1925 her family threw her a party in Lithgow where she announced that she would "return to Sydney on Monday and on Tuesday enter in earnest on the six-years job of constructing the harbour bridge". She was honoured at a lunch of the Professional Women Workers' Association in February 1925, hosted by Grace Scobie, Mary Jamieson Williams and Dr Mary Booth, leading Australian women's rights activists.

She was present at the ceremony of the turning of the first sod for the North Railway Approach to the bridge and she was publicly thanked for her services. Bradfield paid her tribute in a paper which he wrote for his D.Sc. degree at Sydney University. Butler was a member of the Sydney University War Memorial Committee, and involved in the Memorial Carillion. Her role was to represent the views of younger women.

In 1926, Butler contributed two illustrated articles to The Woman Engineer journal, detailing the technical work progress on Sydney Harbour Bridge, including one photograph of Butler herself drilling the first hole into the steel work for the bridge. She undertook site visits with the project engineers, including the inspection of the excavation for the south west skewback.

Butler got married in early 1927, which led to her having to leave her job, as married women were not expected to continue in employment. Her leaving gift was a grandfather's clock, given as a token of "the good will and esteem of the officers of the Sydney Harbour Bridge and Metropolitan Railway Construction Branches and of the Public Works Department" and Bradfield's statement that "Miss Butler's capability led to her attaining the position of trust and responsibility she held in the Department, and that her retirement would be a distinct loss to the Bridge branch".

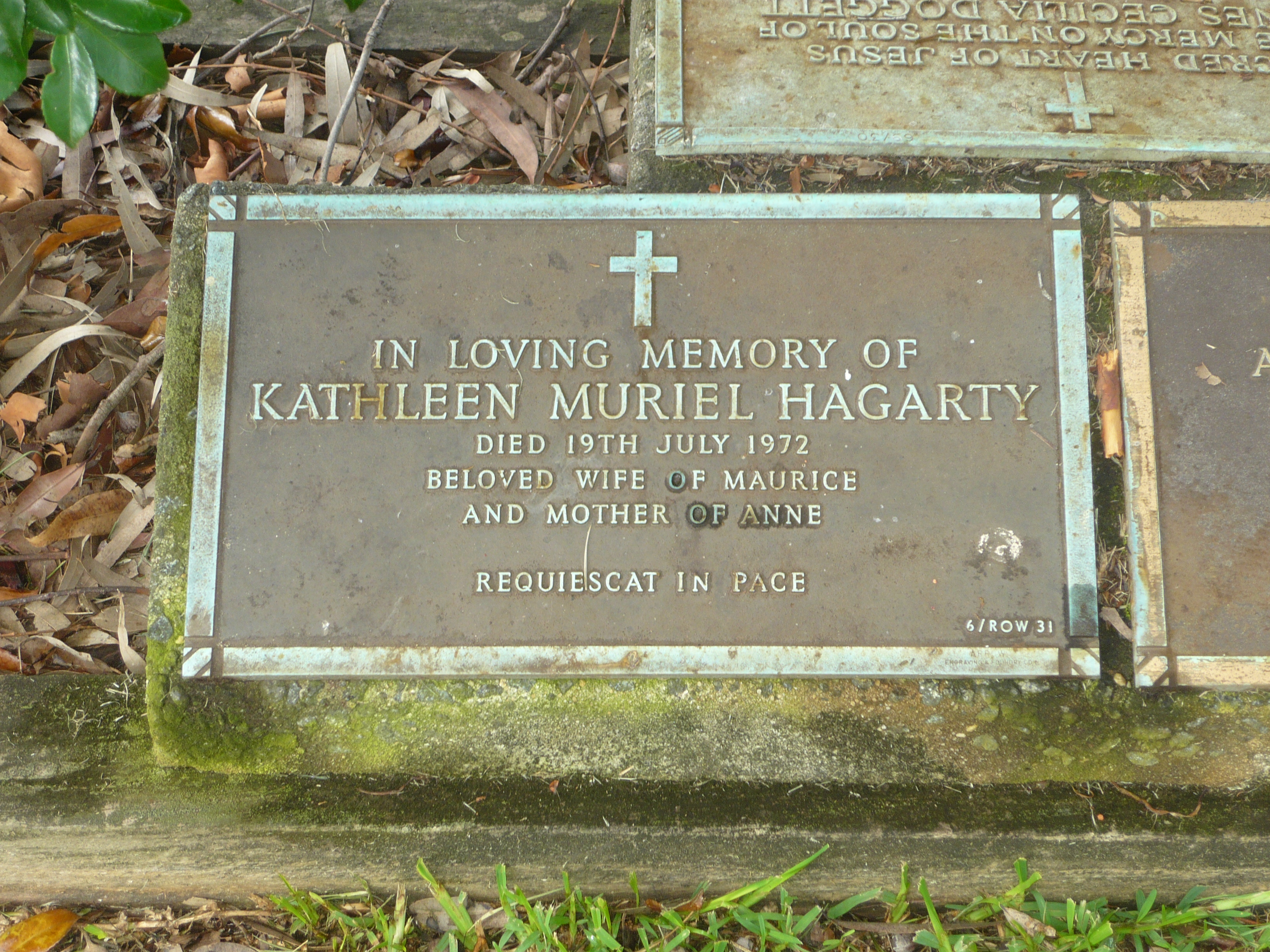
Grave of Kathleen Muriel Butler (Mrs Hagarty) in Macquarie Park Cemetery Sydney Australia

== Personal life ==
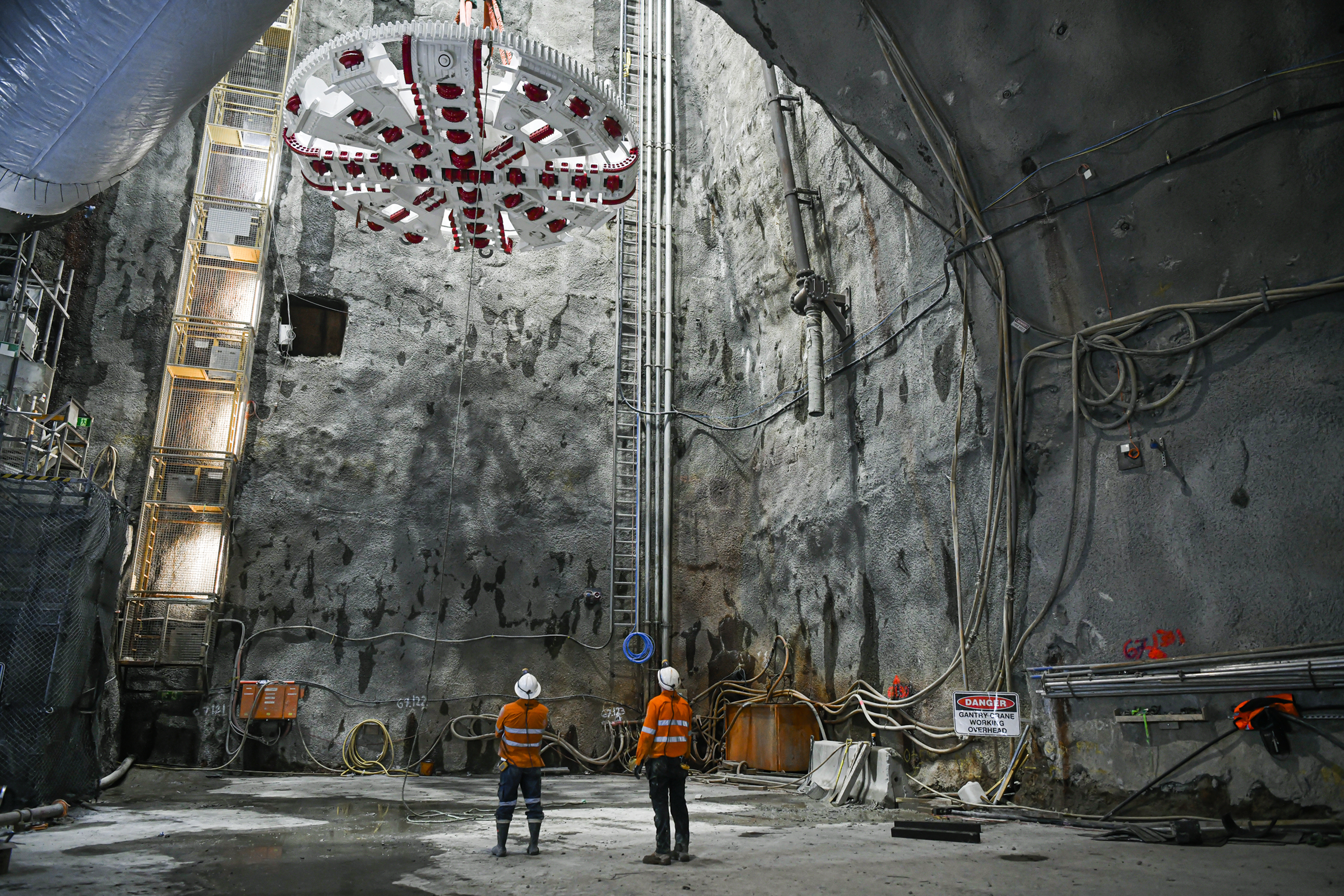
Sydney Metro – Barangaroo – Cutterhead of the Tunnel Boring Machine named Kathleen after Kathleen Butler

On 20 April 1927, Butler married Maurice Hagarty, a grazier from Cunnamulla, Queensland, in St Mary's Cathedral, Sydney. He had proposed by singing opera.

They had a daughter, Anne Josephine, in 1931. She kept in touch with the Bradfield family and visited for the opening of the bridge in 1932. In 1936, Butler took her daughter to visit Bradfield and his wife Edith in Sydney, admitting she "cannot curb her interest in the new Queensland bridge at Kangaroo Point [the Story Bridge in Brisbane, for which Bradfield was the consulting engineer] and feels she 'hates to be out of it all'".

The marriage was not a happy one, and Hagarty was violent towards his wife and child. Kathleen eventually left her husband in the 1950s after her daughter married and left home. She moved back to Sydney in 1958 and lived in a flat below her sister Grace. When her grandchildren came to stay she had the garden piled with sand to replicate what they knew from their home in the outback to make them feel more comfortable.

In 1961, with her sister Gladys, she bought a house at 41 Wycombe Road, Kurraba Point, from where the Bridge can be seen. Butler would walk her visiting grand-children Maurice and Maria to the harbour and regale them with stories about her part in the building of Sydney Harbour Bridge.

Kathleen Butler Hagarty died on 19 July 1972, aged 81. She is buried in Macquarie Park Cemetery, Sydney.

== Legacy ==
In 2019, a 130-metre tunnel boring machine for the Sydney Metro was named Kathleen in her honour.

In 2022, Butler was chosen as one of the notable people buried in Macquarie Park Cemetery whose life stories were told on video as part of the commemoration of the burial ground's centenary.

In November 2023, it was announced that Butler was one of eight women chosen to be commemorated in the second round of blue plaques sponsored by the Government of New South Wales alongside, among others, Emma Jane Callaghan, an Aboriginal midwife and activist; Susan Katherina Schardt; Dorothy Drain, one of Australia's first female war correspondents; writer Charmian Clift; Pearl Mary Gibbs, an Aboriginal rights movement activist; and charity worker Grace Emily Munro. The plaque was unveiled on 6 August 2024 at Butler's former place of work, the Chief Secretary’s Building in Phillip Street, Sydney.
