= Dorothy Donaldson Buchanan =

Scottish civil engineer (1899–1985)

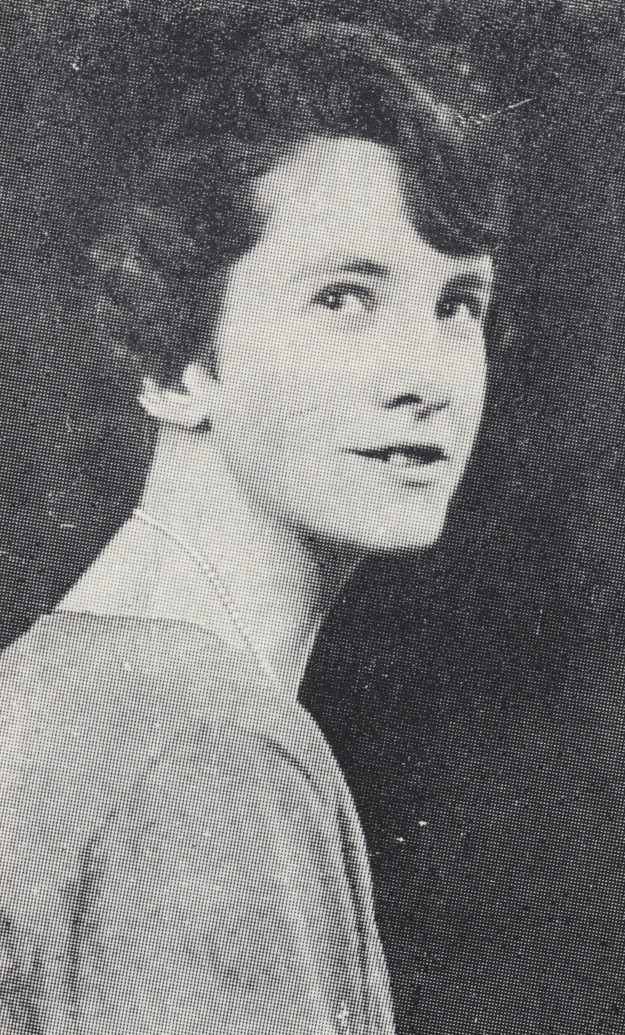
- Portrait of Dorothy Donaldson Buchanan (From her family's archives with their permission)
- Born: Dorothy Donaldson Buchanan; 8 October 1899; Dumfriesshire, Scotland
- Died: 13 June 1985 (aged 85); Somerset, England
- Other name: Dorothy Fleming
- Occupation: Civil Engineer
- Known for: First female member of the Institution of Civil Engineers

Dorothy Donaldson Buchanan, married name Fleming (8 October 1899 in Dumfriesshire – 13 June 1985 in Somerset) was a Scottish civil engineer, and the first female member of the Institution of Civil Engineers, successfully passing the institution's admission examination in 1927.

== Early life and education ==
Buchanan was born at Langholm, the youngest of five children of Reverend James Donaldson Buchanan and Marion Vassie. She was educated at Langholm Academy in Langholm, a town where Thomas Telford had worked as a mason before going on to become an eminent civil engineer; this may have been the inspiration for Buchanan to choose to study for a degree in civil engineering from the University of Edinburgh from 1918. At the university, she studied with Charles Glover Barkla, who had been awarded a Nobel Prize in Physics in 1917 and her time overlapped with the first woman in Scotland to graduate with a degree in engineering, Elizabeth Georgeson. Buchanan was listed on the 1921 census, taken on 19 June, as a part-time engineering student and a visitor at Georgeson's home Upper Sunnyside on Lowther Street in Penrith. She became a member of the Women's Engineering Society during her time at university. Illness (mumps) delayed her completion of her studies, so she graduated in 1923. Further illness (pneumonia) caused her to seek a change of climate by moving south to London after her graduation and in order to continue her professional training as a civil engineer.

== Career ==
Her first success in attracting the attention of an employer was with Sir Ralph Freeman, a senior partner of Douglas, Fox & Partners. Freeman was providing consultancy advice, on steel design, to contractors Dorman Long. Having hired Buchanan, Freeman allowed her to transfer to Dorman Long where she served as part of the design staff for the Sydney Harbour Bridge but she remained under Freeman's supervision for the purposes of her training contract from April 1924. Her salary was £4 per week plus overtime, the same as the “boys.” She arrived at Dorman's London office at the same time that Kathleen M. Butler, the project manager and Confidential Secretary to the Sydney Harbour Bridge Chief Engineer John Bradfield arrived with three engineers to set up the offices for the Australian arm of the operation.

She later worked on overseas bridges (Dessouk and Khartoum). Due to the Institution of Civil Engineers training requirement that design engineers also have site experience, Buchanan left London to go to work on the Belfast water supply scheme at the Silent Valley Reservoir project in Northern Ireland. In Northern Ireland, her training supervision was undertaken by Sir Ernest Moir, a director of S. Pearson and Son (and husband of Margaret, Lady Moir, co-founder of the Women's Engineering Society). Buchanan is reputed to have avoided having to have a chaperone by simply and repeatedly departing for work before the chaperone arrived. After six months with the reservoir project, Buchanan had sufficient experience to fulfil that part of her qualification obligations and was able to return to Dorman Long in London to continue with their bridge design team, working on the George V Bridge (now usually called the Tyne Bridge) in Newcastle and the Lambeth Bridge in London. In 1929, she gave a lecture on the work required for the construction of "Some Modern Bridges".

Buchanan pursued her professional qualification with the Institution of Civil Engineers and had to attend an interview at the ICE headquarters at One Great George Street, London (near Parliament Square) as part of the examination process. In an interview for the New Civil Engineer magazine in 1978, she recounted being surprised to find another woman in the waiting room, because she was aware that she would be the first female engineer to be recognised by the ICE if she were to be successful in the interview. The other woman in the waiting room transpired to be a chaperone brought in for the sake of decency. She was granted membership of the ICE in December 1927, as the only female amongst 9,979 men in the Institution. She later remarked, ‘I felt that I represented all the women in the world. It was my hope that I would be followed by many others’ (New Civil Engineer, 6 July 1978, 15–16).

== Later life ==
Upon marriage in 1930 to William H. Dalrymple Fleming, an electrical engineer, she retired from engineering. As Dorothy Fleming, she pursued interests in rock climbing and painting. She died in 1985, at age 85. In February 2019, to celebrate their first female member of the institution, the ICE named a room after her, at their headquarters (in the same building where she had not been allowed to be interviewed without the presence of a chaperone).
