= Bradfield Scheme =

Proposed Australian water diversion project

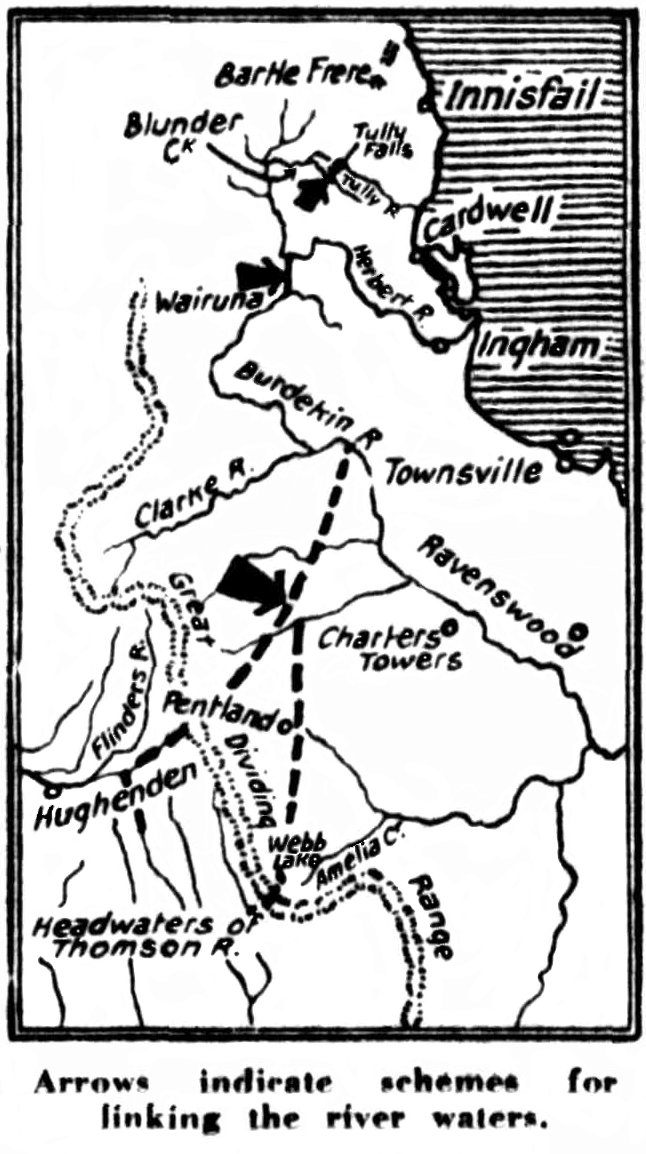
- Map of the water transfers of the scheme, first published 1 October 1938.
- Purpose: Irrigate agricultural land in western Queensland, Australia
- Proposed: 1938
- Abandoned: 1947
- Proponents: John Bradfield; Bob Katter; Peter Beattie
- Opponents: W. H. R. Nimmo

The Bradfield Scheme, a proposed Australian water diversion scheme, is an inland irrigation project that was designed to irrigate and drought-proof much of the western Queensland interior, as well as large areas of South Australia. It was devised by Dr John Bradfield (1867–1943), a Queensland born civil engineer, who also designed the Sydney Harbour Bridge and Brisbane's Story Bridge.

The scheme that Bradfield proposed in 1938 required large pipes, tunnels, pumps and dams. It involved diverting water from the upper reaches of the Tully, Herbert and Burdekin rivers. These Queensland rivers are fed by the monsoon, and flow east to the Coral Sea. It was proposed that the water would enter the Thomson River on the western side of the Great Dividing Range and eventually flow south west to Lake Eyre.

G. W. Leeper of the school of agricultural science at the University of Melbourne considered the plan to be lacking in scientific justification.

In 1981, a Queensland NPA subcommittee proposed a variation of the scheme.

== Proposed benefits ==
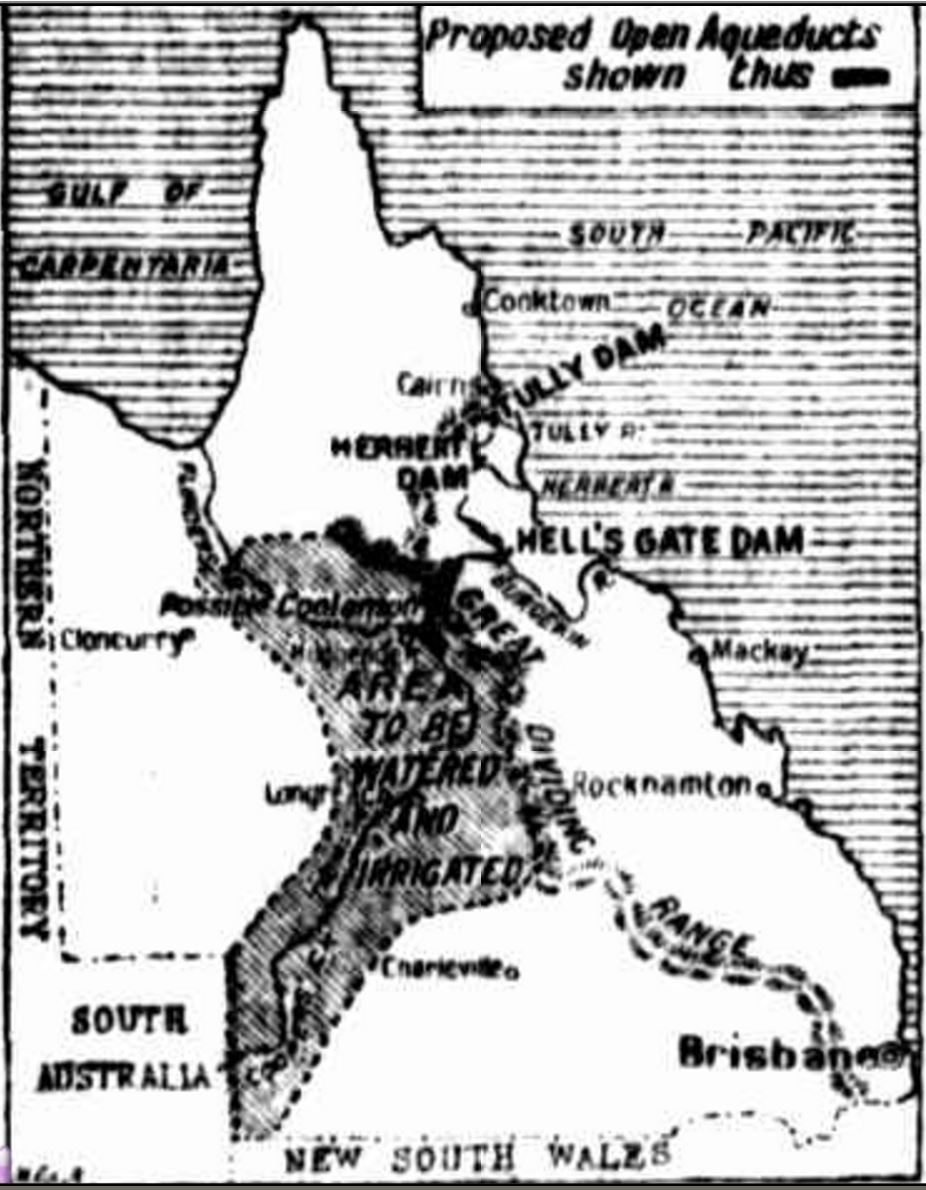
Bradfield Scheme irrigation area

The water was expected to provide irrigation for more than 3,000 square miles (7,800 km^{2}) of agricultural land in Queensland. The scheme had the ability to generate 370 megawatts (500,000 hp) of power and the potential to double that amount.

It is claimed that extra water and vegetation in the interior may then produce changes to the climate of Australia, however various studies have concluded that this is unlikely. This may increase the rainfall in areas of southern Queensland and northern New South Wales. Extra rainfall may drought-proof Eastern Queensland, and thereby improve river inflows to the Murray-Darling River system. It is claimed that a full Lake Eyre would moderate the air temperature in the region by the absorption of sunlight by the water instead of heat radiation from dry land into the air.

== Objections ==
Bradfield's scheme and others have been criticised because of the claim that they are not practical. This scheme has been criticised because of the high capital and ongoing running costs which opponent believe would make the project uneconomical. Former Minister for Agriculture and Drought David Littleproud opposed the scheme saying it was outdated and discredited.

Elevation measurements were taken with a barometer, leading to inaccuracies in land heights and mistakes in the proposal. In most cases no flow record of the rivers were available to Bradfield. He used an empirical formula which assumed 33% of the water flow would be lost to evaporation and seepage. The estimated water available for the scheme was 114 cubic metres per second (4,000 cu ft/s).

In 1947, W.H.R. Nimmo conducted a critical review of the scheme. He proved that Bradfield's estimates of the amount of water available from the easterly flowing rivers were about two and half times greater than it actually was. The error was attributed to the methodology used to calculate flow estimates which was based on German rivers where the average temperature was much less than in northern Australia.

A 2022 CSIRO investigation found the scheme to be unviable due to a lack of reliable water.

== Support ==
The Bradfield Scheme has not received broad political support from any of the major Australian parties in recent times, but it has been pushed by individual politicians such as Bob Katter, who advocated the plan whilst he was a member of the Nationals for the state seat of Flinders during the 1980s, and continues to support it as an independent, representing the federal seat of Kennedy. In February 2007, the then Queensland Premier Peter Beattie urged the Federal Government to look at a modern version, saying it is better to find more water than to cut back on current supplies. However, Beattie preferred desalination.

In May 2019, former Nationals leader Barnaby Joyce and Pauline Hanson's One Nation party expressed support for the scheme.

In November 2019, the Liberal National Party of Queensland, through the opposition leader Deb Frecklington, provided support of the project as a long term investment.

== See also ==
- Goldfields Water Supply Scheme
- Irrigation in Australia
- Ord River Irrigation Scheme
- Great Man-Made River
- Snowy Mountains Scheme
- North American Water and Power Alliance
