= Argyle Street Railway Substation =

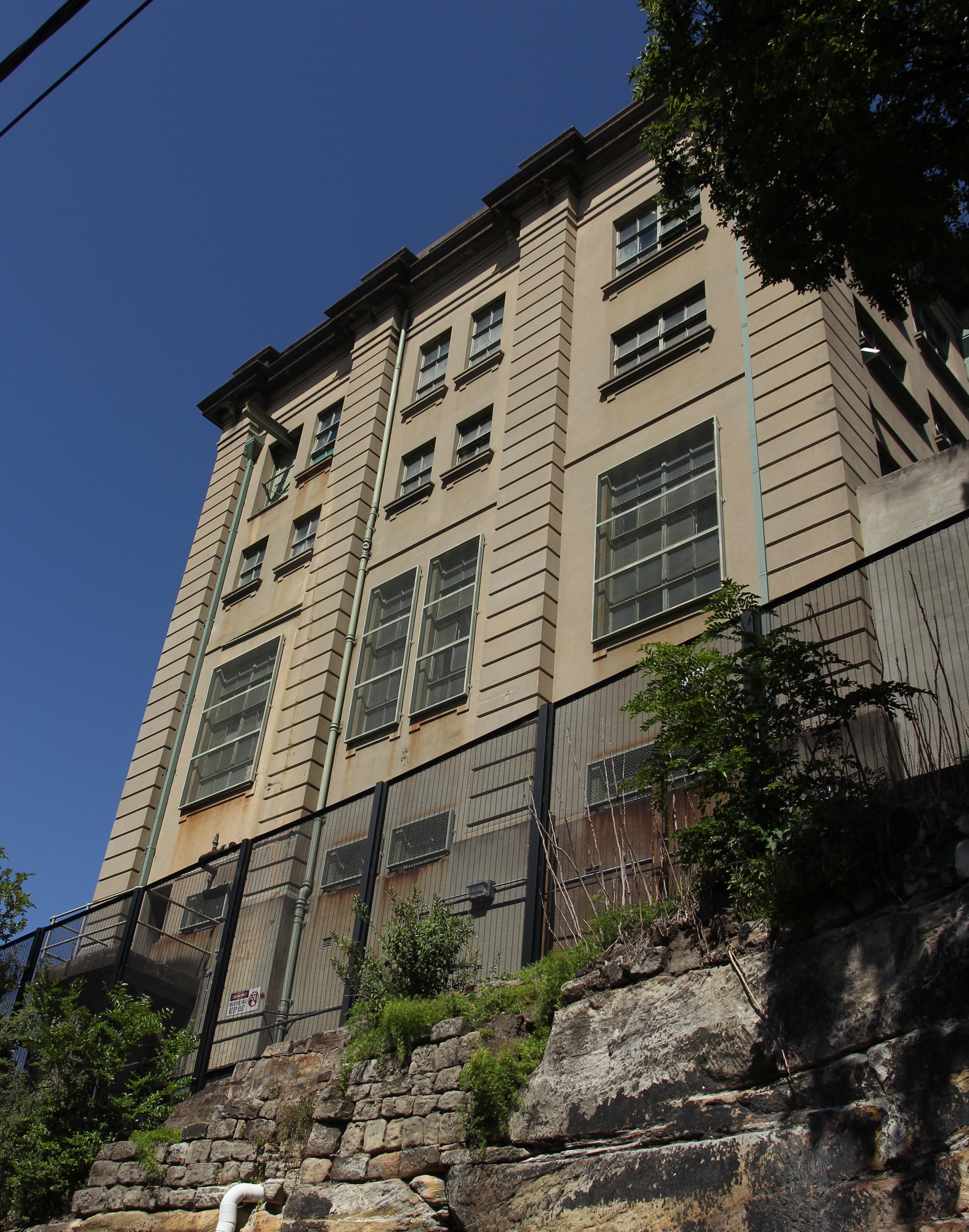
- Argyle Street Railway Substation, pictured from Trinity Avenue, Millers Point, in 2019.

- Location within Sydney Location within Australia
- 33.8580°S 151.2064°E
- Location: Trinity Avenue, Millers Point, City of Sydney, New South Wales, Australia

History
- Built: 1932
- Built for: New South Wales Government Railways

Site notes
- Architectural style: Inter-War Stripped Classical
- Owner: Transport Asset Manager of New South Wales

New South Wales Heritage Register
- Official name: Argyle Street Railway Substation; Sydney Harbour Bridge Substation
- Type: State heritage (built)
- Designated: 2 April 1999
- Reference no.: 1022
- Type: Electricity Transformer/Substation
- Category: Utilities - Electricity
- Builders: Dorman, Long and Co.

The Argyle Street Railway Substation is a heritage-listed railway electric substation located at Trinity Avenue, in the inner city Sydney suburb of Millers Point in the City of Sydney local government area of New South Wales, Australia. It was built in 1932 by Dorman, Long and Co. It is also known as Sydney Harbour Bridge Substation. The property is owned by Transport Asset Manager of New South Wales, an agency of the Government of New South Wales. It was added to the New South Wales State Heritage Register on 2 April 1999.

== History ==
The Argyle substation and switchhouse were built as integral parts of the southern approaches to the Sydney Harbour Bridge and part of the overall provision and workings towards the electrification of the Sydney railway system. The substation is constructed in a Stripped Classical style which relates to the style used on the approaches to the bridge and carries through the unpainted cement render finish. It was completed in 1932. The substation was one of 15 built during the period 1926–1932 as part of the electrification of the suburban network. Each was built to a standard design and layout, although the Argyle Street substation was externally rendered to match the Sydney Harbour Bridge. Of the 15, eight remain in operational use (2009).

As the suburban railway lines were converted from steam to electric traction, substations, located approximately 8 kilometres (5.0 mi) apart were required for efficiency in direct current (DC). A 1500 volt DC system to power the overhead conductors was adopted for the NSW Railways.

The building houses transformers originally used to convert the alternating current supplied from the Ultimo Power Station and White Bay Power Station to a direct current that was used for the train and tram tunnels and lighting the bridge. The original bridge lighting was installed by New South Wales Government Railways and was supplied to designs by the Department of Public Works. The buildings remain relatively intact externally and internally and continue to serve the Harbour Bridge and electric train tunnels.

The original Reyrolle Bath Oil Motorised Switches were replaced prior to World War II. Some time during the 1960s larger transformers from the Prince Alfred substation were transferred to Argyle Street. In 1999–2000, these transformers were in turn replaced with larger transformers to cope with increased loads. A single (non-functioning) example of the Reyrolle Switch is retained in the Argyle Street switchhouse.

The Sydney Harbour Bridge was designed and constructed as the essential link in a transport scheme envisaged by John Job Crew Bradfield and designed to enhance and promote the development of the metropolis, effectively opening up the north shore to the city and making the city more accessible. In 1924 preparations for the construction of the bridge began and as a result Dawes Point and The Rocks area was subject to a continuous stream of building work and whole streets were levelled and altered. The approaches to the Sydney Harbour Bridge were designed and built by the Department of Public Works and the Metropolitan Railway Construction branch of NSW Government Railways between 1924 and 1932.

== Description ==
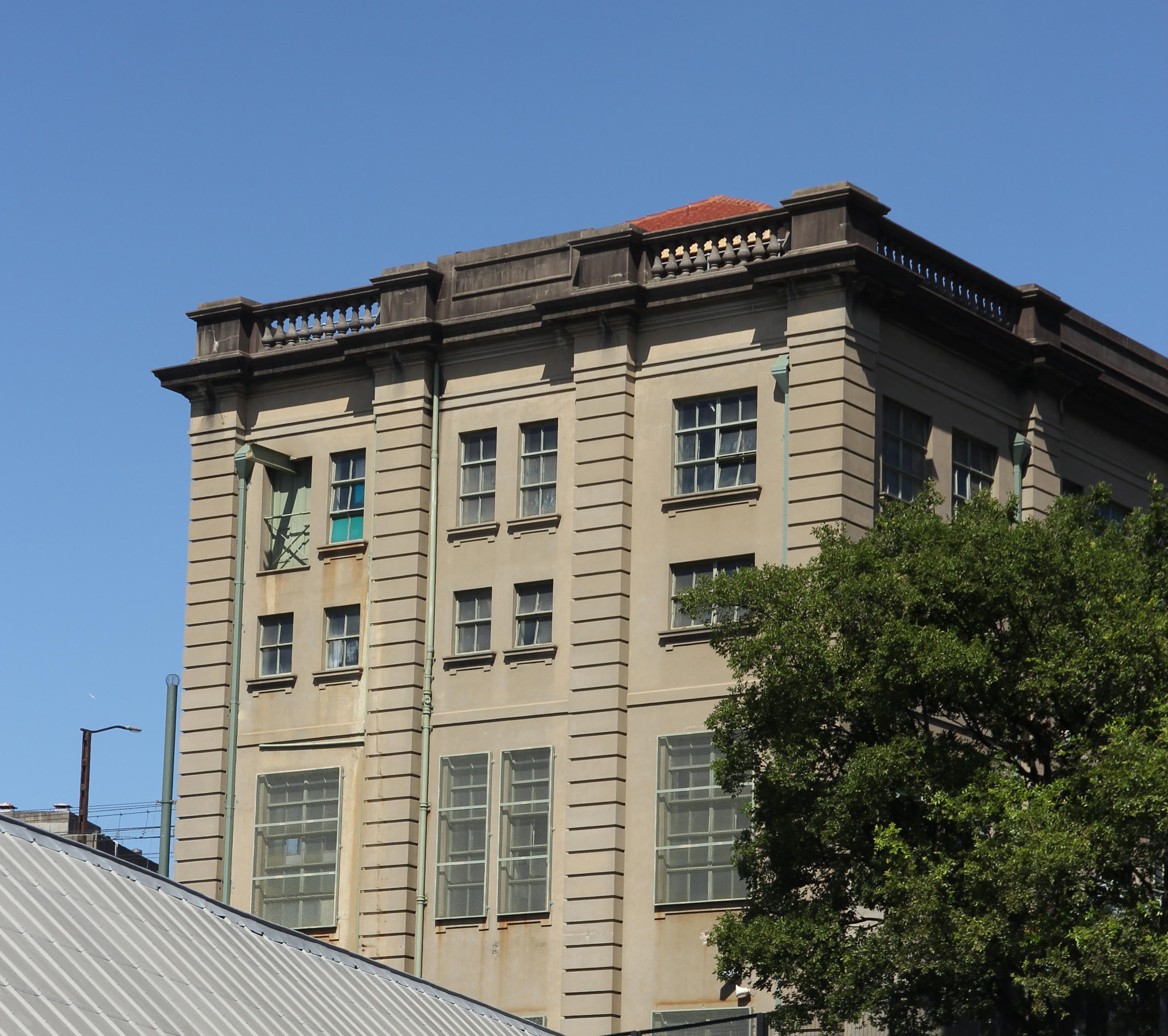
Pictured in 2019 from the junction of Lower Fort and Argyle Streets.

=== Substation (1932) ===
The Argyle Street substation, which includes the substation building, the switchhouse, transformers and surrounding electrical equipment - are all located in an area enclosed by steel mesh fencing on an escarpment above Trinity Avenue. The substation is a rendered brick, four-storey building constructed in the Inter-War Stripped Classical style and featuring steel windows with moulded and rendered sills and banded pilasters extending from ground level to a deep moulded cornice and parapet. It is accessible from the Harbour Bridge cycleway via a pair of timber doors with rendered architrave and pediment. The substation also features a double-tiered hipped roof.

The roof is supported by exposed steel trusses and a gantry supported by a steel frame. The two lower levels contain functioning electrical equipment while the control, office and amenities area is located on the two mezzanines. The ground floor is accessed via steel roller shutter doors on the north and south sides of the building, wide enough to allow equipment to be moved in and out. Internal steel stairs connect the mezzanine and ground floor levels.

=== The Switchhouse (1932) ===
The switchhouse, located south of the substation, is a single-storey rendered structure with steel-framed windows and a gabled hip tiled roof.

The roof is supported by exposed steel trusses. The floor is of painted concrete with painted exposed brick walls. The switchhouse includes a single example of a Reyrolle Oil Bath Motorised Switch (no longer functioning) and a row of modern switchboards.

=== The yard ===
Transformers are located outside between the main substation building and the switchhouse.

=== Moveable heritage ===
Items of moveable heritage include the Reyrolle Motorised Switch in the switchhouse. In the substation a timber phone box, a switchboard, a framed plan of the Sydney Harbour Bridge and a large overhead gantry crane remain.

=== Modifications and dates ===
- Post-1962 (date unknown): upgrade of transformers.
- 1999–2000: upgrade of 1962 transformers.

== Heritage listing ==
The Argyle Street substation is of state significance as a unique and original feature of the Sydney Harbour Bridge construction. It was constructed as part of the electrification of the Sydney suburban railway network, one of 15 built between 1926 and 1932, and it continues to convert electrical power for use on the network. The building is a good example of the Inter-War Stripped Classical style and stands as a landmark industrial building in the Millers Point area. Its unpainted, cement render facade is in keeping with the approach ways of the Sydney Harbour Bridge which it abuts. The substation retains a rare example of original switchgear (non-operational) in the switch house.

The Argyle Street Railway Substation was listed on the New South Wales State Heritage Register on 2 April 1999 having satisfied the following criteria.

The place is important in demonstrating the course, or pattern, of cultural or natural history in New South Wales.

The Argyle Street substation is significant as an integral part of the southern approaches of the Sydney Harbour Bridge and as a vital working component of the electrification of Sydney's suburban train system. It was constructed as part of the wider Sydney Harbour Bridge and suburban electrification project. The building is significant for its part in supplying electricity for the new rail network across the Sydney Harbour Bridge and is therefore associated with the social changes and effects which the bridge had in opening up Sydney's north shore.

The place is important in demonstrating aesthetic characteristics and/or a high degree of creative or technical achievement in New South Wales.

The Substation building has significance as a relatively intact and fine example of an Inter-War Stripped Classical industrial building that forms a prominent feature on the approach to the Sydney Harbour Bridge, Rocks and Millers Point areas. The building is significant for its rendered facades matching the Sydney Harbour Bridge approach ways. The Substation's prominent location emphasises its role in the service of the bridge and the railway, and acts as a landmark in the Millers Point urban landscape.

The place has a strong or special association with a particular community or cultural group in New South Wales for social, cultural or spiritual reasons.

The place has the potential to contribute to the local community's sense of place and can provide a connection to the local community's history.

The place possesses uncommon, rare or endangered aspects of the cultural or natural history of New South Wales.

The Argyle Street substation is a unique feature of the Sydney Harbour Bridge construction and infrastructure. Of the fifteen substations constructed between 1926 and 1932 it is the only one of its type in terms of design style and rendered finish to match the Sydney Harbour Bridge which it was built to service.

The Reyrolle Oil Bath Motorised Switches are a rare surviving example of a once standard switch type.

The place is important in demonstrating the principal characteristics of a class of cultural or natural places/environments in New South Wales.

The Argyle Street substation is representative of the Inter-War Stripped Classical style used in an industrial building and of the standard design layout of the NSW Railways substations built between 1926 and 1932.

== See also ==
- Australian non-residential architectural styles
