= Brisbane Bitter =

Australian beer

- Manufacturer: Carlton & United Breweries
- Introduced: 1970s
- Alcohol by volume: 4.9%
- Style: Bitter
- Website: http://cub.com.au

Brisbane Bitter (also known as Brisbane River) was a heavy beer originating, as the name suggests, in Brisbane, Australia. It was initially introduced by Carlton & United Breweries in the 1970s. The beer was aimed at the youth market. The can had a picture of Story Bridge in Brisbane.

== See also ==
- Australian pub
- Beer in Australia
- List of breweries in Australia
