= John Douglas Story =

Australian public servant (1869–1966)

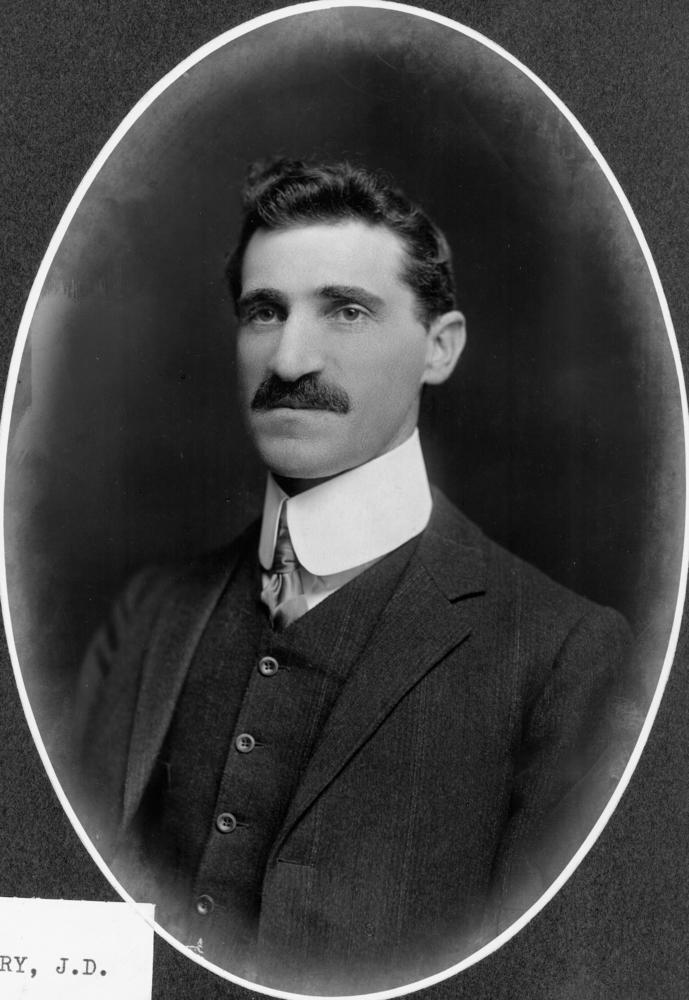
John Douglas Story, ca. 1925

John Douglas Story (7 August 1869 in Edinburgh, Scotland – 2 February 1966 in Brisbane, Australia) was a public servant in Queensland, Australia.

Also known as J. D. Story, he migrated to Brisbane, Queensland, Australia, with his parents, as a child, and attended Brisbane Grammar School and Brisbane Technical College.

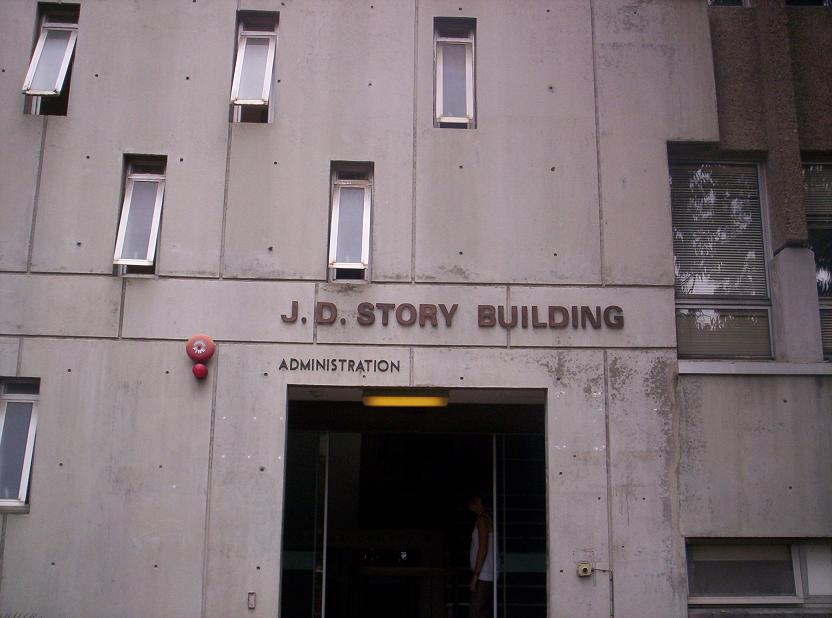
J. D. Story Administration Building at the University of Queensland

Story was a prominent Queensland public servant who entered the Queensland Public Service and was Under-Secretary for the Department of Education between 1906 and 1920. He was the Public Service Commissioner from 1920 to 1939 and served on the Public Service Superannuation Board from 1913 until 1942. He was a long-time member of the Stanley River Works Board which was instrumental in the construction of Somerset Dam.

Story worked for the establishment of the University of Queensland and was a government representative on the University senate. He became UQ's first full-time Vice-Chancellor, serving in an honorary capacity from 1938 to 1959.

The J. D. Story Administration Building at the University of Queensland and Brisbane's Story Bridge were named in his honour. In February 2009 his grandson, John Story, became the 13th Chancellor of the University of Queensland.
