= Elizabeth Georgeson =

Scottish engineer

- Born: Jessie Helen Elizabeth Lilian MacLeod Georgeson; 9 July 1895; Kelvinside, Glasgow
- Died: October 1, 1977 (aged 82)
- Education: University of Edinburgh
- Occupation: engineer

Jessie Helen Elizabeth Lilian MacLeod Georgeson (9 July 1895 – 1 Oct 1977) was a Scottish engineer who was the first woman to graduate in engineering at a Scottish university, the University of Edinburgh.

== Education ==
Georgeson was born in Kelvinside, Glasgow in 1895 to Frederick Hugh Georgeson and Elizabeth Sarah Mackenzie. Her father was a Minister of the United Free Church, so the family later moved to Edinburgh, where she undertook her secondary education at Canaan Park College.

Georgeson was 21 when she began her career at the University of Edinburgh in 1916, over the age of majority and legally an adult, so able to make her own decisions about her education. She may have benefited from the fact that during the First World War, many women were able to take on new roles, and access fields such as engineering.

Georgeson graduated with a BSc in engineering in July 1919. She also achieved a 1st class certificate of merit in mechanical engineering and 2nd class certificates in junior engineering labs and engineering fieldwork.

In September 1920, Georgeson wrote an article on “The Magic of Mathematics” for The Woman Engineer, the journal of the Women's Engineering Society (of which she was a member) in which she was described as “one of the first few women to become an articled pupil to a surveyor, with a view to qualifying as a Civil Engineer”.

She completed the article with a call to enjoy mathematics more: "It is not difficult to see a connection between mathematics and laughter making fun. A brain must be in absolutely tip-top condition to invent really clever nonsense, and the study of mathematics does keep brains truly fit. And the moral of all this, as the Duchess would say, is that we should all work at our maths, it is vitally important to engineers, both directly and indirectly as a brain tonic: and my limited experience of girl engineers leads me to think that we are rather apt to neglect this branch of our craft".

== Career ==
Once Georgeson graduated, she became an articled pupil to a surveyor, hoping to qualifying as a Civil Engineer. She was listed as head of household at Upper Sunnyside on Lowther Street in Penrith in the 1921 census, taken on 19 June, and gave her profession as a civil engineer pupil employed at the Town Hall, Penrith. Her visitor was fellow female engineering student at Edinburgh, Dorothy Buchanan. Georgeson may have been a member of the Edinburgh Mathematical Society.

She later worked in research at the Safety in Mines Research Laboratory in Sheffield and published about her findings. She co-authored 7 papers, her first, in 1925, was on the properties of cement particles, but most of her papers published between 1926-42 were on the properties and behaviour of gases in mines.

In 1942, Georgeson won the only senior scholarship from the Sir James Caird's Travelling Scholarships Trust, giving her £280 (equivalent to £11,000 in 2025) to travel and study. As this was during the Second World War, it is probable that she could only have travelled within Britain.

== Personal life ==
Georgeson wrote poetry and her poem, Flotsam, was published in 1952 in a selection of short poems published as part of the Festival of Britain.
