= John Bradfield (engineer) =

Australian engineer (1867–1943)

John Bradfield CMG
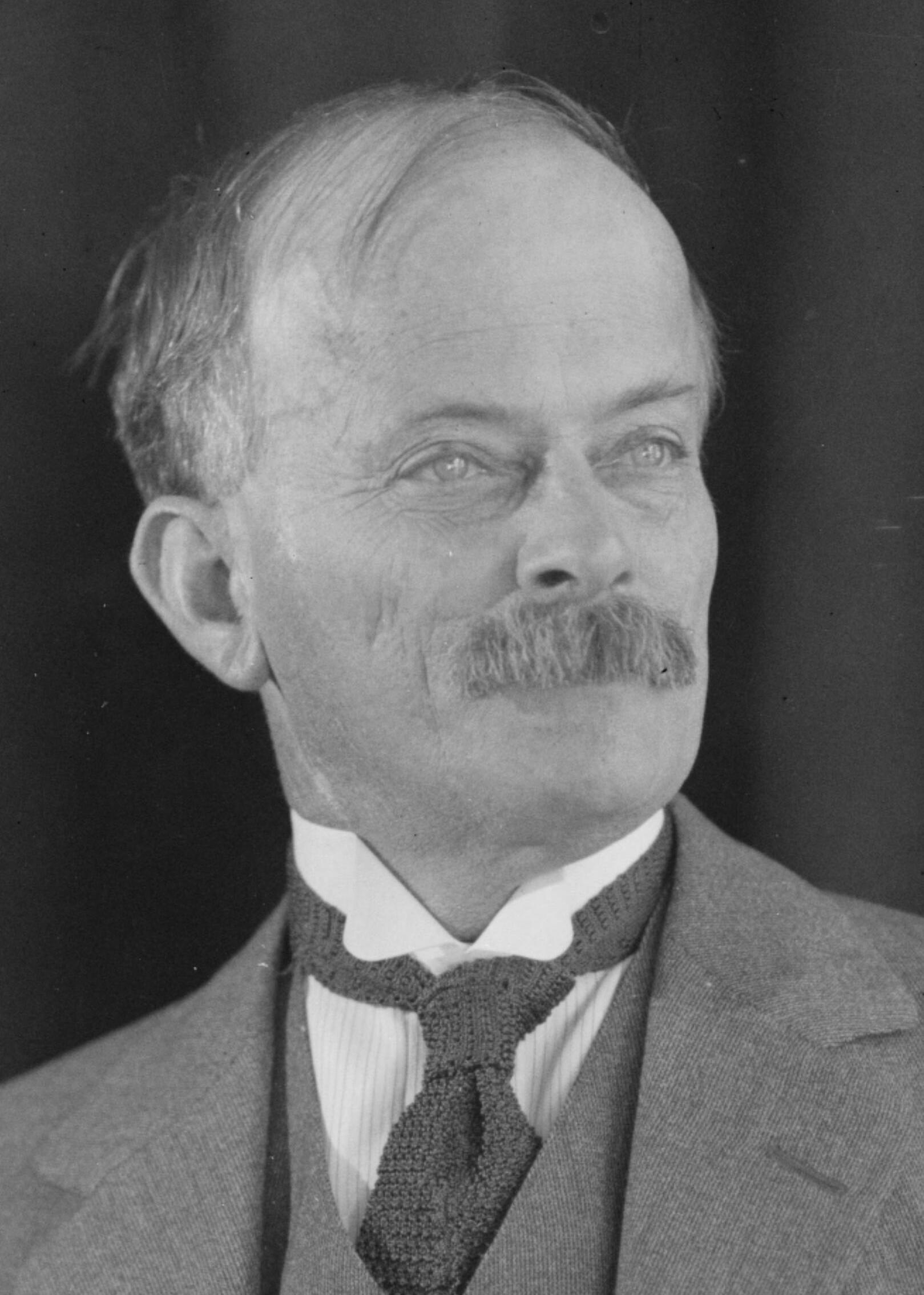
- Born: 26 December 1867; Sandgate, Queensland, Australia
- Died: 23 September 1943 (aged 75); Gordon, New South Wales, Australia
- Resting place: St Johns Anglican Church, Gordon, New South Wales, Australia
- Education: Ipswich Grammar School; University of Sydney
- Spouse: Edith Jenkins (m. 1891)
- Children: 6
- Parent(s): John Edward Bradfield; Maria Bradfield
- Engineering career
- Employers: New South Wales Department of Public Works; Queensland Railways Department
- Projects: Sydney Harbour Bridge
- Significant design: Story Bridge, Circular Quay railway station
- Awards: Peter Nicol Russell Memorial Medal; Telford Medal

Signature
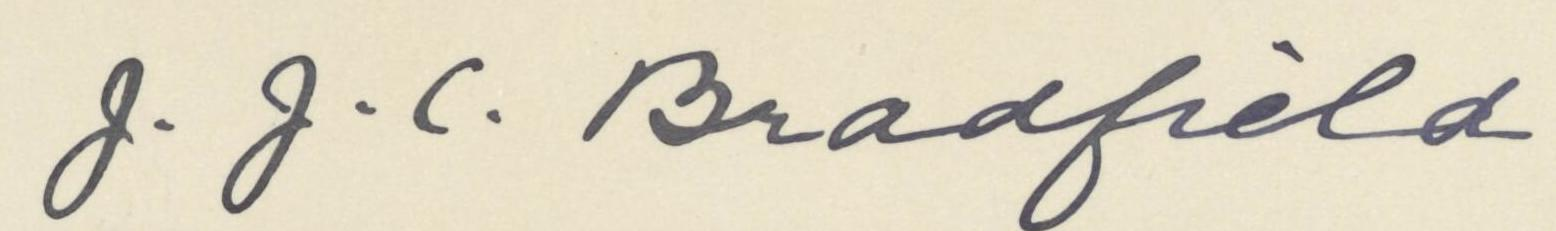

John Job Crew Bradfield CMG (26 December 1867 – 23 September 1943) was an Australian engineer best known as the chief proponent of the Sydney Harbour Bridge, of which he oversaw both the design and construction. He worked for the New South Wales Department of Public Works from 1891 to 1933. He was the first recipient of an engineering doctorate from the University of Sydney, in 1924. Other notable projects with which he was associated include the Cataract Dam (completed 1907), the Burrinjuck Dam (completed 1928), and Brisbane's Story Bridge (completed 1940). The Harbour Bridge formed only one component of the City Circle, Bradfield's grand scheme for the railways of central Sydney, a modified version of which was completed after his death. He was also the designer of an unbuilt irrigation project known as the Bradfield Scheme, which proposed that remote areas of western Queensland and north-eastern South Australia could be made fertile by the diversion of rivers from North Queensland.

== Early life ==
Bradfield was born on 26 December 1867 in Sandgate, Queensland. He was the fourth son of Maria (née Crew) and John Edward Bradfield, and also had four sisters. His father was a Crimean War veteran who had arrived in Brisbane from England in 1857. Bradfield began his education at the North Ipswich State School before winning a scholarship to Ipswich Grammar School. He was the dux of his school and won the chemistry medal at the senior public examination in 1885. The colonial government awarded him an exhibition to attend the University of Sydney, as Queensland did not have a university of its own at the time. He enrolled at St Andrew's College and graduated as a Bachelor of Engineering (BEng) in 1889, winning the University Medal.

After graduating, Bradfield began working for the Queensland Railways Department as a draftsman under the chief engineer. He married Edith Jenkins in 1891, with whom he had five sons and a daughter. In the same year, he was retrenched due to an economic depression, and instead moved to New South Wales where he became a draftsman in the Department of Public Works. Bradfield became an associate of the Institution of Civil Engineers in 1893 and returned to the University of Sydney to complete a Master of Engineering (MEng) degree, where he won first-class honours and was again awarded the University Medal. He was a founder of the Sydney University Engineering Society and later served two terms as its president.

== Professional career ==
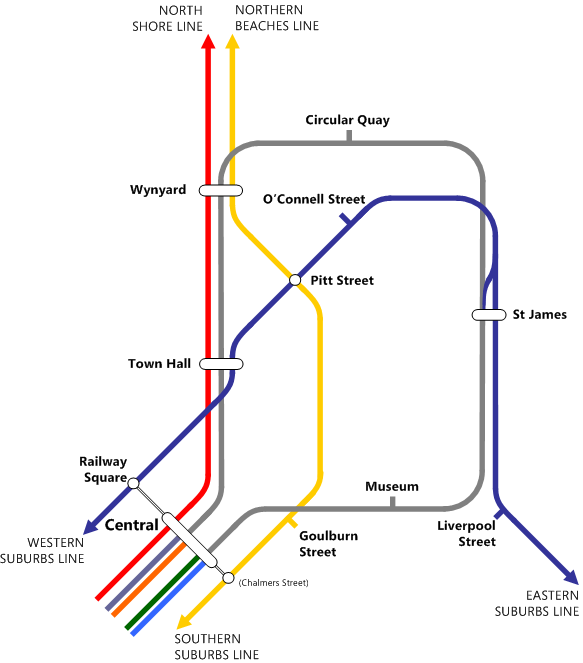
The original railway network for the Sydney CBD planned by John Bradfield

Bradfield worked on a variety of projects during his time at the New South Wales Department of Public Works, including the Cataract Dam near Sydney and the Burrinjuck Dam across the Murrumbidgee River. In January 1909, he was promoted to the rank of assistant engineer with a salary of £400. The following year he applied unsuccessfully for the position of foundation chair of engineering at the University of Queensland. In 1913 he was appointed chief engineer for metropolitan railway construction, when he commenced his long association with Confidential Secretary, Kathleen M. Butler. In 1915 Bradfield submitted a report outlining a grand scheme for Sydney's railways involving the electrification of the suburban railways, a city underground railway and the Sydney Harbour Bridge. World War I led to the collapse of all three proposals.

During World War I, Bradfield worked with Professor Warren and Mr A.E. Cutler to establish the first civil aviation school, where pilots were trained for overseas service.

In 1924, Bradfield was awarded the degree of Doctor of Science (D.Sc.) for a thesis titled "The city and suburban electric railways and the Sydney Harbour Bridge", the first doctorate in engineering awarded by the University of Sydney. In 1935 the University of Queensland awarded him the ad eundem degree of Doctor of Engineering (D.Eng.).

=== Sydney Harbour Bridge and Bradfield railway scheme ===
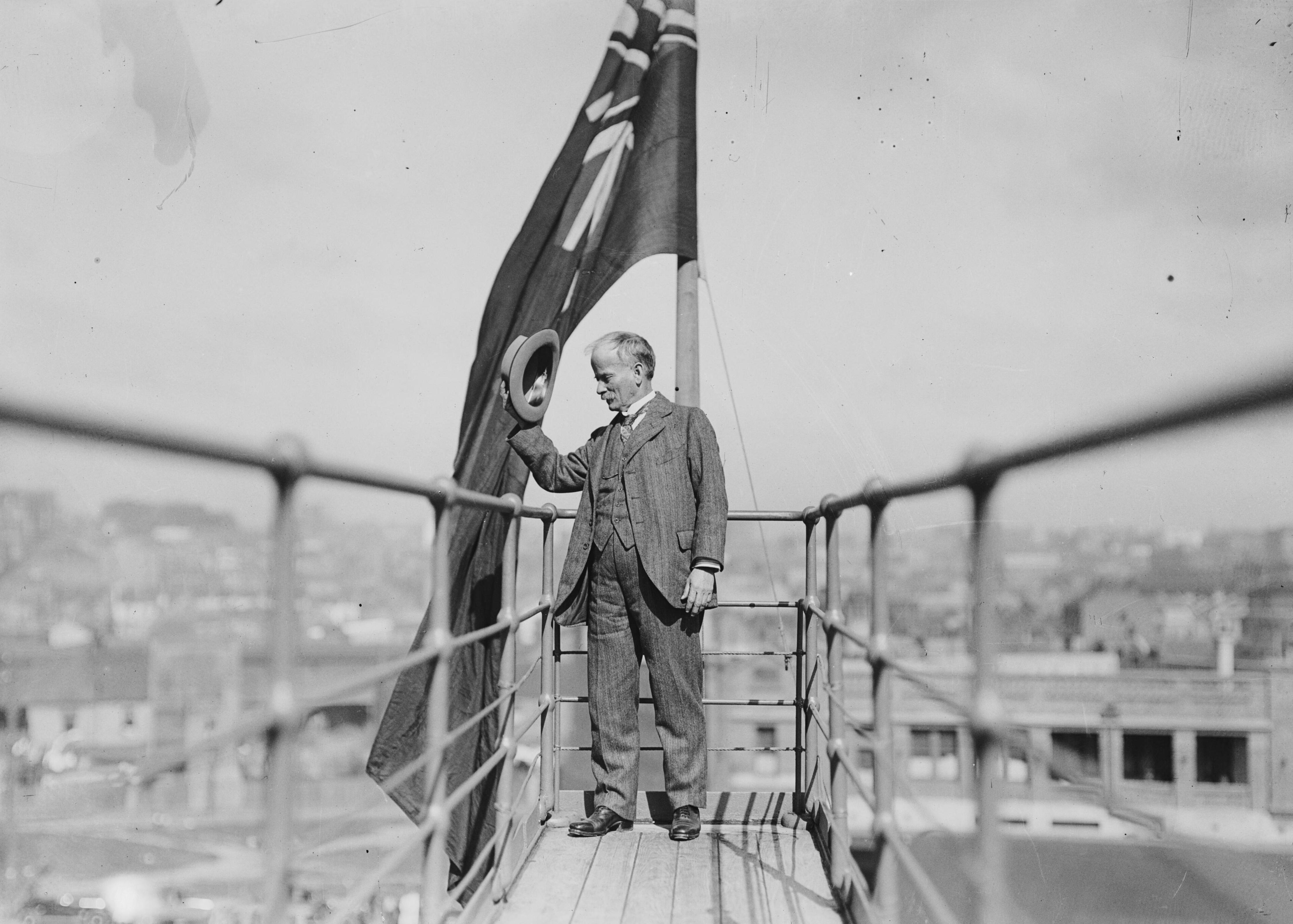
Bradfield doffing his hat to onlookers from the newly constructed Sydney Harbour Bridge

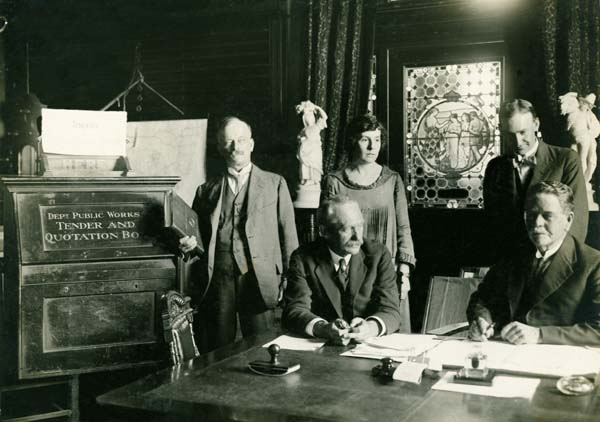
Opening of Tenders January 1924. l-r: Seated T. B. Cooper, R. T. Ball. Standing: J. J. C. Bradfield, Kathleen Butler, Mr. Swift.

It was not until 1922 that the Bridge Bill passed through Parliament. Much of his work on the Sydney Harbour Bridge involved the assistance of his Confidential Secretary Kathleen M. Butler, who undertook work which would now be described as that of a project manager or technical adviser, involved in the checking of specifications and negotiations with tenderers and setting up the project's London office in 1924 at Dorman Long and Co Ltd, the contractors appointed to the bridge project.

Bradfield had a grand vision for Sydney's railway system. Bradfield called for the provision of a network of underground city railway lines beneath Sydney's central business district, the construction of the Sydney Harbour Bridge and a new railway station, Central. While the central idea of an underground loop beneath the city was implemented, and stub tunnels built at designated interchanges for provision of future lines, many of his related ideas remain unimplemented. A larger network of lines was proposed for the western, eastern and southern suburbs, however most of these lines remain conceptual and have never been constructed.

The building of the bridge coincided with the construction of a system of underground railways in Sydney's Central business district, known today as the City Circle, and the bridge was designed with this in mind. The bridge was designed to carry four wide lanes of road traffic, flanked on each side by two railway tracks and a footpath. (These four wide lanes were later converted into six "standard" width lanes.) Both sets of rail tracks were linked into the underground Wynyard railway station on the southern end of the bridge by symmetrical ramps and tunnels.

The eastern-side railway tracks were intended for use by a planned rail link to the Northern Beaches, though they were used for tram services from the North Shore to Wynyard station. The intention was to operate tram services until the implementation of a heavy rail service to the Northern Beaches; however, when tram services were discontinued in 1959, they were converted into extra road traffic lanes, which now serve the Cahill Expressway and a city-bound bus lane.

The Depression, and later World War II, along with the post-War growth of motor vehicle usage led to projected patronage of passenger services in Bradfield's plan being overestimated. Parts of the city underground were constructed and exist as the present-day City Circle. Small sections were also built for additional proposed city lines, such as additional platforms at Wynyard and St James railway stations which have never been used for heavy rail transport.

In 1923, the first sod was turned on the city railway. The City Circle was constructed originally as a stub line to St James, via the Town Hall, Wynyard and towards the Harbour Bridge. It was not until 1955 that the loop was completed by the construction of Circular Quay station. A line to the eastern suburbs was eventually built, but along a different alignment to that envisaged by Bradfield, who proposed a line along Oxford Street.

Bradfield retired from the New South Wales Department of Public Works at the end of July 1933 after 42 years of service with the intention of continuing to work as a consulting engineer.

=== Other works ===
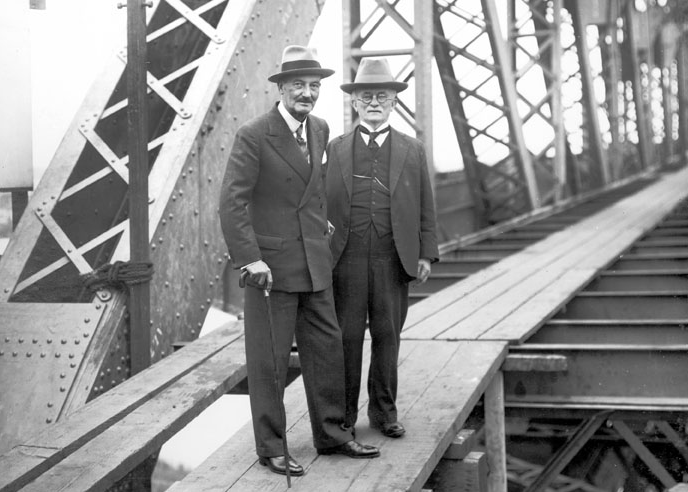
Bradfield and Queensland state governor Leslie Orme Wilson inspecting Brisbane's Story Bridge

Bradfield was the designer and consulting engineer for the Story Bridge, Brisbane. He also designed the Cataract and Burrinjuck Dams.

In October 1938 Bradfield published a proposal (known as the Bradfield Scheme) for diverting some coastal rivers of Queensland onto the western side of the Great Dividing Range. However, it was never implemented. Bradfield designed the Circular Quay railway station. but it was not built until many years after his death.

== List of significant projects ==
A number of Bradfield's works are listed on the Australian, New South Wales, and Queensland heritage registers:

=== Bridges, viaducts and other infrastructure ===
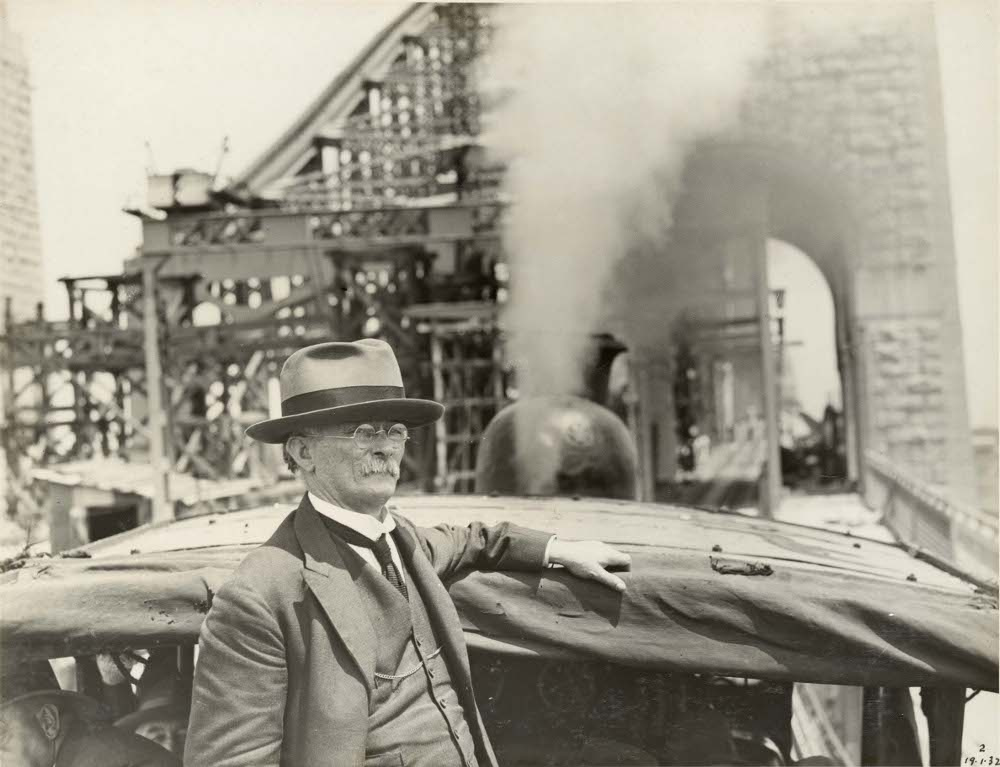
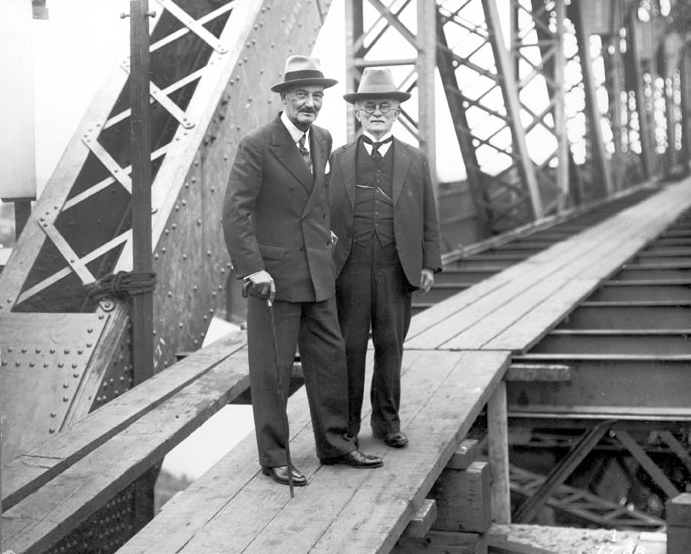
Bridge / viaduct / infrastructure name	Heritage register	Use(s)	Year completed	Image
Sydney Harbour Bridge, approach viaducts, approaches and curtilage, northern pylons; Bradfield Highway, Sydney; and Dawes Point	Australian; NSW	Road, tram (former), rail and pedestrian traffic	1932
Story Bridge, Kangaroo Point	Queensland	Road and pedestrian traffic	1940
Argyle Street railway sub–station	Australian; NSW	Electricity sub–station	1932

=== Railway stations ===
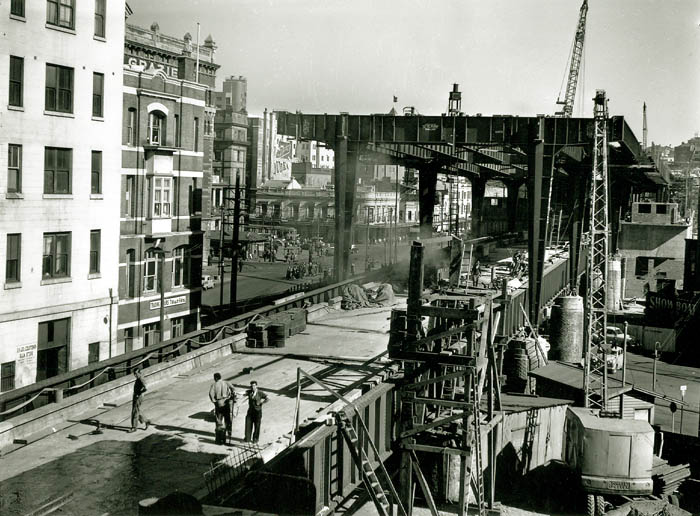
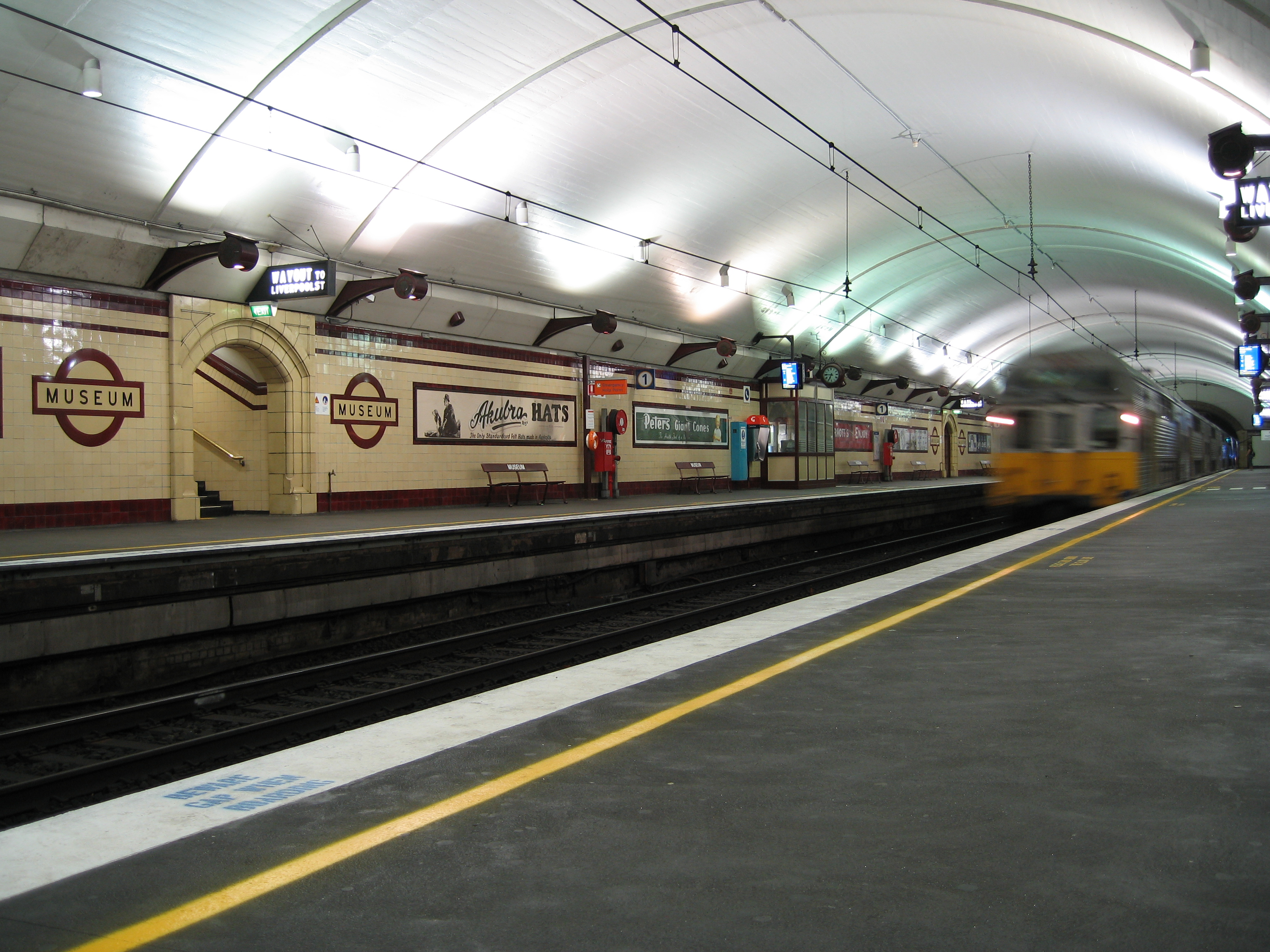
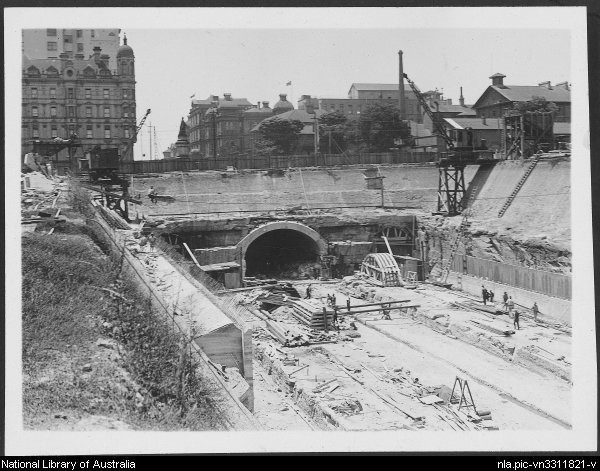
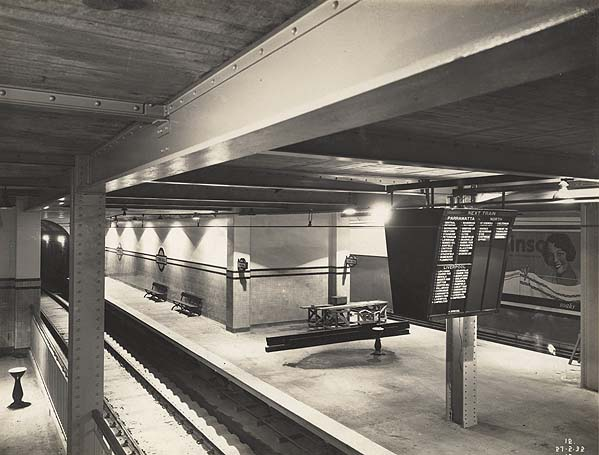
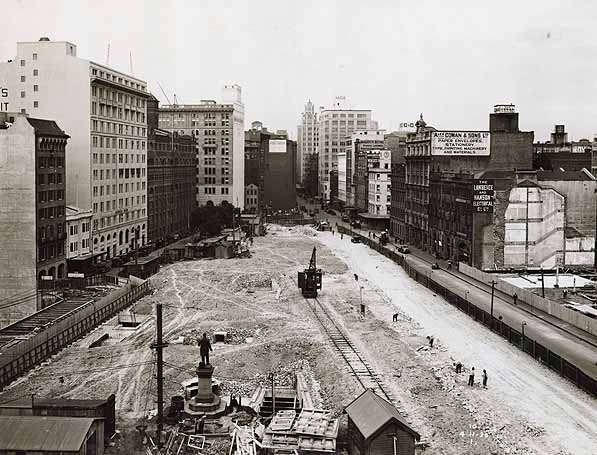
Railway station	Heritage register	Railway line(s)	Year completed	Image
Circular Quay railway station and viaduct	NSW	City Circle	1956
Museum railway station	NSW	City Circle	1926
St James underground railway station	NSW	City Circle	1926
Town Hall underground railway station	NSW	City Circle	1932
Wynyard underground railway station and Wynyard former tram tunnels	NSW	City Circle	1932

== Personal life ==
Bradfield married Edith Jenkins, daughter of John Ventris Jenkins, in Brisbane on 28 May 1891. They had one daughter Mary Margaret (1892–1984) and five sons: Edward (born 1893), Anthony Bailey (1895–1974), Alan (1903), Stanley George (1906–1951), and Keith Noel Everal (1910–2006). Keith (known as Bill) Bradfield, an engineer with the Department of Civil Aviation, was responsible for changes to Alexandra Canal adjacent to Sydney Airport allowing the airport to expand between 1947 and 1970.

Bradfield died at home in the Northern Sydney suburb of Gordon on 23 September 1943. A memorial service was held at St Andrew's Cathedral and he was buried at St John's Anglican Church.

== Honours ==
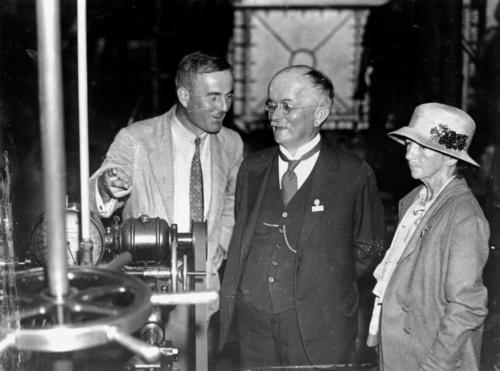
Bradfield in 1933

Named in his honour are Bradfield highways in both Sydney and Brisbane, the Federal electorate of Bradfield, the North Shore Sewerage Bradfield Carrier in West Killara and Bradfield Senior College, a school for the creative industries in St Leonards. A footbridge in his home town of Ipswich, Queensland was named in his honour in 2010.

A Fellow of the Senate of the University of Sydney, Bradfield was awarded the Peter Nicol Russell Memorial Medal by the Institution of Engineers Australia, and appointed a Companion of the Order of St Michael and St George in 1933.

In 1934 he was awarded the Telford Medal by the Publications Committee of the Institution of Civil Engineers of London for his paper The Sydney Harbour Bridge, and its Approaches. In July 1936 the Institution of Civil Engineers in London elected Bradfield as a member of council representing Australia. In August 1940, a plaque was placed on the Story Bridge recognising the contributions of many of those involved, including Bradfield in Brisbane. He was awarded Queensland Institute of Engineers lifetime achievement award in 2007.

The Bradfield Highway in Sydney, which is the main roadway section of the bridge and its approaches, is named in honour of Bradfield's contribution to the bridge.

The locality of West Lindfield, the western part of Lindfield, was originally called Bradfield, between 1924 and 1977, and over that period, was named after John Bradfield. There is still a road there, called Bradfield Road.

In March 2021 it was announced that a new city centre would be named Bradfield by the New South Wales government. The advanced manufacturing and airport city will be built next to Sydney's second airport at Bringelly. The name was selected with community input. A panel made the final decision to honour Bradfield's lasting impact on Sydney, including his major role in the Sydney Harbour Bridge.
