= List of former local government areas of Queensland =

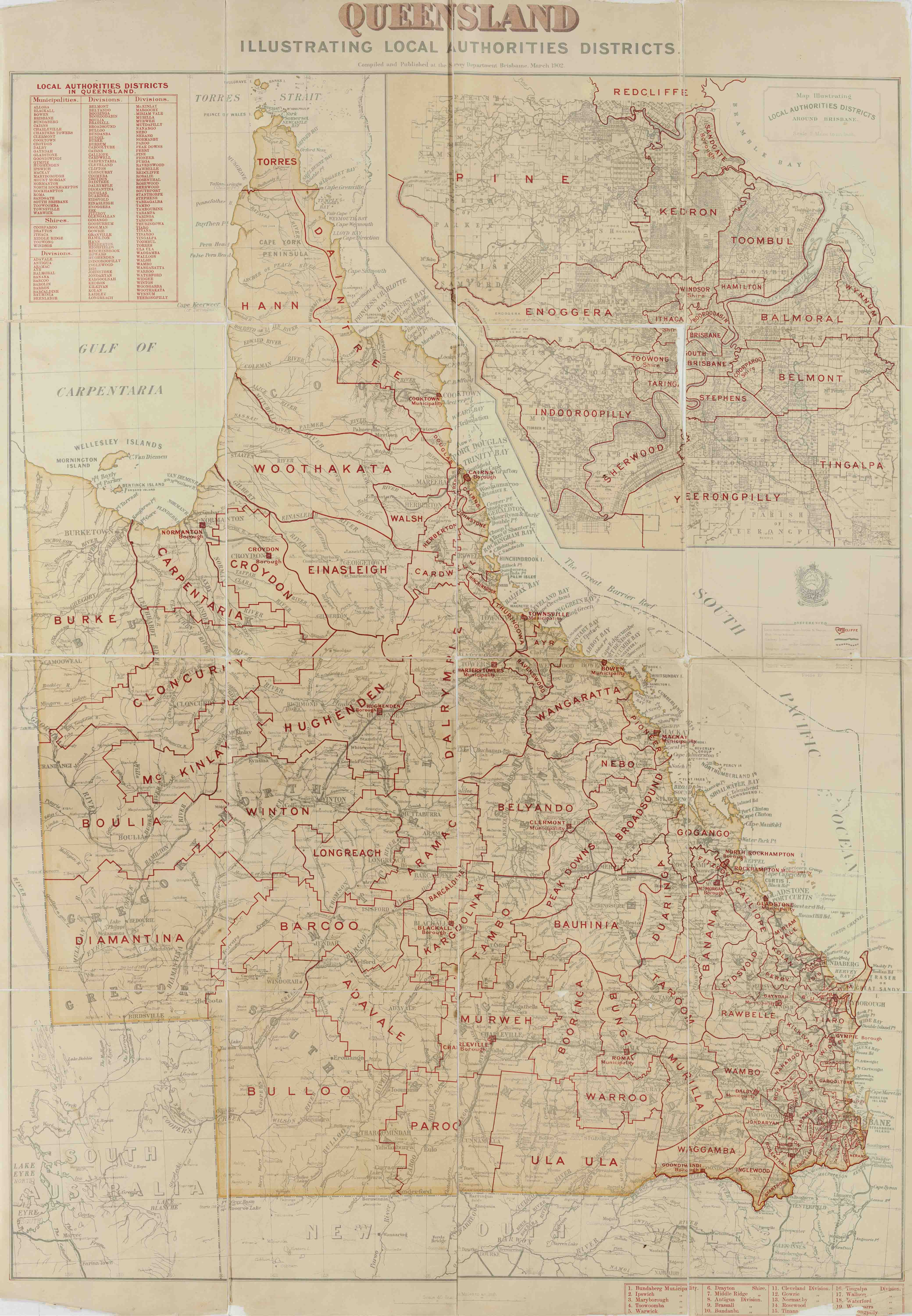
Local government areas (municipalities, shires and divisions) in Queensland, March 1902

The local government areas (LGAs) of Queensland, Australia are the defined areas within which legally constituted local government authorities, known as councils, have responsibilities to provide local services. Determining the size and shape of the local government areas is the sole responsibility of the Queensland Government.

In the past, many local government areas (especially in South East Queensland and the Darling Downs region) have been amalgamated or abolished, either voluntarily or involuntarily. The most significant of these processes took place in March 2008, when 97 local government areas and 20 indigenous councils were amalgamated under a statewide reform process – until this time, the majority of Queensland's local government areas had remained unchanged for decades and some even dated back to the establishment of local government for regional areas in 1879.

== Local government de-amalgamations in 2014 ==
In 2014, after referendums were held, 4 previously amalgamated Shires were de-amalgamated.

- The Shire of Douglas separated from Cairns Region
- The Shire of Mareeba separated from Tablelands Region
- The Shire of Livingstone separated from Rockhampton Region
- The Shire of Noosa separated from Sunshine Coast Region

The Resulting List of councils and their Number Code

Administrative Area	LGA Code
AURUKUN SHIRE	250
BALONNE SHIRE	300
BANANA SHIRE	370
BARCALDINE REGIONAL	410
BARCOO SHIRE	450
BLACKALL TAMBO REGIONAL	760
BOULIA SHIRE	900
BRISBANE CITY	1000
BULLOO SHIRE	1750
BUNDABERG REGIONAL	1820
BURDEKIN SHIRE	1900
BURKE SHIRE	1950
CAIRNS REGIONAL	2080
CARPENTARIA SHIRE	2250
CASSOWARY COAST REGIONAL	2260
CENTRAL HIGHLANDS REGIONAL	2270
CHARTERS TOWERS REGIONAL	2310
CHERBOURG ABORIGINAL SHIRE	2330
CLONCURRY SHIRE	2450
COOK SHIRE	2500
CROYDON SHIRE	2600
DIAMANTINA SHIRE	2750
DOOMADGEE ABORIGINAL SHIRE	2770
DOUGLAS SHIRE	2810
ETHERIDGE SHIRE	3100
FLINDERS SHIRE	3200
FRASER COAST REGIONAL	3220
GLADSTONE REGIONAL	3360
GOLD COAST CITY	3430
GOONDIWINDI REGIONAL	3610
GYMPIE REGIONAL	3620
HINCHINBROOK SHIRE	3800
HOPE VALE ABORIGINAL SHIRE	3830
IPSWICH CITY	3960
ISAAC REGIONAL	3980
KOWANYAMA ABORIGINAL SHIRE	4420
LIVINGSTONE SHIRE	4530
LOCKHART RIVER ABORIGINAL SHIRE	4570
LOCKYER VALLEY REGIONAL	4580
LOGAN CITY	4590
LONGREACH REGIONAL	4710
MACKAY REGIONAL	4770
MAPOON ABORIGINAL SHIRE	4830
MARANOA REGIONAL	4860
MAREEBA SHIRE	4880
MCKINLAY SHIRE	4800
MORETON BAY REGIONAL	5010
MORNINGTON SHIRE	5250
MOUNT ISA CITY	5300
MURWEH SHIRE	5600
NAPRANUM ABORIGINAL SHIRE	5670
NOOSA SHIRE	5740
NORTH BURNETT REGIONAL	5760
NORTHERN PENINSULA AREA REGIONAL	5780
PALM ISLAND ABORIGINAL SHIRE	5790
PAROO SHIRE	5800
PORMPURAAW ABORIGINAL SHIRE	6070
QUILPIE SHIRE	6150
REDLAND CITY	6250
RICHMOND SHIRE	6300
ROCKHAMPTON REGIONAL	6370
SCENIC RIM REGIONAL	6510
SOMERSET REGIONAL	6580
SOUTH BURNETT REGIONAL	6630
SOUTHERN DOWNS REGIONAL	6660
SUNSHINE COAST REGIONAL	6720
TABLELANDS REGIONAL	6820
TOOWOOMBA REGIONAL	6910
TORRES SHIRE	6950
TORRES STRAIT ISLAND REGIONAL	6960
TOWNSVILLE CITY	7010
WEIPA TOWN	7300
WESTERN DOWNS REGIONAL	7310
WHITSUNDAY REGIONAL	7340
WINTON SHIRE	7400
WOORABINDA ABORIGINAL SHIRE	7550
WUJAL WUJAL ABORIGINAL SHIRE	7570
YARRABAH ABORIGINAL SHIRE	7600

== Local government areas amalgamated in 2008 ==
In April 2007, an extensive local government reform process was set up by the Beattie Government, who set up a Local Government Reform Commission to report on the State's local government areas (other than the City of Brisbane). This was in part due to the number of financially weak councils with small populations in rural areas, dating from an earlier time when industry and population had justified their creation. The Commission reported back on 27 July 2007, recommending massive amalgamations all over the State into "regional councils" centred on major towns or centres, based on a range of criteria such as economy of scale, community of interest and financial sustainability. On 10 August 2007, the commission's amalgamation recommendations passed into law as the Local Government (Reform Implementation) Act 2007, with only a few name changes as alterations. "Local Transition Committees" (LTCs) were created for each new area, made up of councillors and staff from the original areas, and on 15 March 2008, the old entities formally ceased to exist and elections were held to fill the new councils.

LGA	Type	Seat	Region	Established	Area (km^{2})	Pop 2006	Notes
Aramac	Shire	Aramac	Central West	1879	23,364.1	754	Amalgamated into Barcaldine
Atherton	Shire	Atherton	Far North	1879	623.1	11,483	Amalgamated into Tablelands
Barcaldine	Shire	Barcaldine	Central West	1892	8,448.4	1,818	Amalgamated into Barcaldine
Bauhinia	Shire	Springsure	Central Queensland	1879	23,649.6	2,742	Amalgamated into Central Highlands
Beaudesert	Shire	Beaudesert	South East	1948	2,854.3	62,902	Split between Scenic Rim and Logan
Belyando	Shire	Clermont	Central Queensland	1865	30,281.3	11,823	Amalgamated into Isaac
Bendemere	Shire	Yuleba	Darling Downs	1911	3,926.8	962	Amalgamated into Maranoa
Biggenden	Shire	Biggenden	Wide Bay–Burnett	1905	1,314.5	1,506	Amalgamated into North Burnett
Blackall	Shire	Blackall	Central West	1879	16,366.8	1,524	Amalgamated into Blackall-Tambo
Boonah	Shire	Boonah	South East	1880	1,921.6	8,770	Amalgamated into Scenic Rim
Booringa	Shire	Mitchell	Darling Downs	1879	27,835.3	1,859	Amalgamated into Maranoa
Bowen	Shire	Bowen	North Queensland	1960	21,184.4	14,625	Amalgamated into Whitsunday
Broadsound	Shire	St Lawrence	Central Queensland	1879	18,546.0	8,021	Amalgamated into Isaac
Bundaberg	City	Bundaberg	Wide Bay–Burnett	1881	95.5	46,573	Amalgamated into Bundaberg
Bungil	Shire	Roma	Darling Downs	1880	13,336.9	2,242	Amalgamated into Maranoa
Burnett	Shire	Bargara	Wide Bay–Burnett	1994	2,000.8	27,232	Amalgamated into Bundaberg
Caboolture	Shire	Caboolture	South East	1879	1,224.4	132,459	Amalgamated into Moreton Bay
Cairns	City	Cairns	Far North	1885	1,691.4	148,261	Amalgamated into Cairns
Calliope	Shire	Calliope	Central Queensland	1879	6,547.2	17,002	Amalgamated into Gladstone
Caloundra	City	Caloundra	South East	1912	1,093.1	90,341	Amalgamated into Sunshine Coast
Cambooya	Shire	Greenmount	Darling Downs	1914	638.5	5,652	Amalgamated into Toowoomba
Cardwell	Shire	Tully	Far North	1884	3,062.2	11,133	Amalgamated into Cassowary Coast
Charters Towers	City	Charters Towers	North Queensland	1877	42.0	8,155	Amalgamated into Charters Towers
Chinchilla	Shire	Chinchilla	Darling Downs	1912	8,700.3	6,574	Amalgamated into Western Downs
Clifton	Shire	Clifton	Darling Downs	1879	867.5	2,549	Amalgamated into Toowoomba
Cooloola	Shire	Gympie	Wide Bay–Burnett	1993	2,968.8	36,956	Amalgamated into Gympie
Crows Nest	Shire	Crows Nest	Darling Downs	1913	1,629.9	12,595	Amalgamated into Toowoomba
Dalby	Town	Dalby	Darling Downs	1863	47.9	9,857	Amalgamated into Western Downs
Dalrymple	Shire	Charters Towers	North Queensland	1879	68324.5	3,782	Amalgamated into Charters Towers
Douglas	Shire	Mossman	Far North	1879	2,436.7	16,754	Amalgamated into Cairns
Duaringa	Shire	Duaringa	Central Queensland	1881	17,751.8	8,102	Amalgamated into Central Highlands
Eacham	Shire	Malanda	Far North	1910	1,126.4	6,589	Amalgamated into Tablelands
Eidsvold	Shire	Eidsvold	Wide Bay–Burnett	1890	4,809.4	876	Amalgamated into North Burnett
Emerald	Shire	Emerald	Central Queensland	1902	10,362.2	16,082	Amalgamated into Central Highlands
Esk	Shire	Esk	Wide Bay–Burnett	1879	3,936.3	15,002	Amalgamated into Somerset
Fitzroy	Shire	Gracemere	Central Queensland	1899	5,898.7	10,310	Amalgamated into Rockhampton
Gatton	Shire	Gatton	South East	1880	1,571.8	15,572	Amalgamated into Lockyer Valley
Gayndah	Shire	Gayndah	Wide Bay–Burnett	1879	2,709.3	2,911	Amalgamated into North Burnett
Gladstone	City	Gladstone	Central Queensland	1863	162.5	29,523	Amalgamated into Gladstone
Goondiwindi	Town	Goondiwindi	Darling Downs	1888	14.6	4,873	Amalgamated into Goondiwindi
Herberton	Shire	Herberton	Far North	1895	9,607.0	5,563	Amalgamated into Tablelands
Hervey Bay	City	Torquay	Wide Bay–Burnett	1975	2,356.3	56,427	Amalgamated into Fraser Coast
Ilfracombe	Shire	Ilfracombe	Central West	1895	6,575.5	279	Amalgamated into Longreach
Inglewood	Shire	Inglewood	Darling Downs	1879	5,876.7	2,575	Amalgamated into Goondiwindi
Isis	Shire	Childers	Wide Bay–Burnett	1886	1,702.2	6,663	Amalgamated into Bundaberg
Isisford	Shire	Isisford	Central West	1904	10,482.6	347	Amalgamated into Longreach
Jericho	Shire	Alpha	Central West	1913	21,864.9	920	Amalgamated into Barcaldine
Johnstone	Shire	Innisfail	Far North	1881	1,639.1	19,154	Amalgamated into Cassowary Coast
Jondaryan	Shire	Oakey	Darling Downs	1890	1,910.0	13,965	Amalgamated into Toowoomba
Kilcoy	Shire	Kilcoy	Wide Bay–Burnett	1912	1,445.2	3,424	Amalgamated into Somerset
Kilkivan	Shire	Kilkivan	Wide Bay–Burnett	1886	3,263.4	3,431	Amalgamated into Gympie
Kingaroy	Shire	Kingaroy	Wide Bay–Burnett	1912	2,420.3	12,285	Amalgamated into South Burnett
Kolan	Shire	Gin Gin	Wide Bay–Burnett	1879	2,650.6	4,638	Amalgamated into Bundaberg
Laidley	Shire	Laidley	South East	1888	700.6	14,311	Amalgamated into Lockyer Valley
Livingstone	Shire	Yeppoon	Central Queensland	1879	11,776.3	29,950	Amalgamated into Rockhampton
Longreach	Shire	Longreach	Central West	1899	23,561.4	4,180	Amalgamated into Longreach
Mackay	City	Mackay	Central Queensland	1869	2,897.5	85,399	Amalgamated into Mackay
Mareeba	Shire	Mareeba	Far North	1919	53,610.8	18,561	Amalgamated into Tablelands
Maroochy	Shire	Nambour	South East	1890	1,162.7	151,599	Amalgamated into Sunshine Coast
Maryborough	City	Maryborough	Wide Bay–Burnett	1861	1,233.9	26,597	Amalgamated into Fraser Coast
Millmerran	Shire	Millmerran	Darling Downs	1913	4,520.8	3,078	Amalgamated into Toowoomba
Mirani	Shire	Mirani	Central Queensland	1916	3,280.2	5,404	Amalgamated into Mackay
Miriam Vale	Shire	Miriam Vale	Central Queensland	1882	3,778.1	5,715	Amalgamated into Gladstone
Monto	Shire	Monto	Wide Bay–Burnett	1932	4,320.8	2,577	Amalgamated into North Burnett
Mount Morgan	Shire	Mount Morgan	Central Queensland	1890	492.0	2,925	Amalgamated into Rockhampton
Mundubbera	Shire	Mundubbera	Wide Bay–Burnett	1915	4,192.8	2,236	Amalgamated into North Burnett
Murgon	Shire	Murgon	Wide Bay–Burnett	1914	664.7	3,454	Amalgamated into South Burnett
Murilla	Shire	Miles	Darling Downs	1879	6,075.8	2,758	Amalgamated into Western Downs
Nanango	Shire	Nanango	Wide Bay–Burnett	1888	1,735.4	9,049	Amalgamated into South Burnett
Nebo	Shire	Nebo	Central Queensland	1883	10,034.6	4,359	Amalgamated into Isaac
Noosa	Shire	Tewantin	South East	1910	868.7	51,962	Amalgamated into Sunshine Coast
Peak Downs	Shire	Capella	Central Queensland	1882	8,125.8	3,759	Amalgamated into Central Highlands
Perry	Shire	Mount Perry	Wide Bay–Burnett	1879	2,357.7	445	Amalgamated into North Burnett
Pine Rivers	Shire	Strathpine	South East	1888	774.5	140,103	Amalgamated into Moreton Bay
Pittsworth	Shire	Pittsworth	Darling Downs	1913	1,089.5	4,688	Amalgamated into Toowoomba
Redcliffe	City	Redcliffe	South East	1888	41.3	51,332	Amalgamated into Moreton Bay
Rockhampton	City	Rockhampton	Central Queensland	1860	188.7	59,943	Amalgamated into Rockhampton
Roma	Town	Roma	Darling Downs	1867	77.9	6,664	Amalgamated into Maranoa
Rosalie	Shire	Goombungee	Darling Downs	1879	2,200.7	8,893	Amalgamated into Toowoomba
Sarina	Shire	Sarina	Central Queensland	1912	1,444.3	10,632	Amalgamated into Mackay
Stanthorpe	Shire	Stanthorpe	Darling Downs	1879	2,697.7	9,968	Amalgamated into Southern Downs
Tambo	Shire	Tambo	Central West	1881	14,083.8	615	Amalgamated into Blackall-Tambo
Tara	Shire	Tara	Darling Downs	1912	11,682.3	3,591	Amalgamated into Western Downs
Taroom	Shire	Taroom	Darling Downs	1879	18,644.5	2,340	Split between Banana (S) and Western Downs
Thuringowa	City	Thuringowa Central	North Queensland	1879	1,866.9	59,164	Amalgamated into Townsville (C)
Tiaro	Shire	Tiaro	Wide Bay–Burnett	1879	2,185.3	5,233	Split between Fraser Coast and Gympie
Toowoomba	City	Toowoomba	Darling Downs	1860	116.5	90,466	Amalgamated into Toowoomba
City of Townsville	City	Townsville	North Queensland	1866	1,868.7	95,464	Amalgamated into Townsville (C)
Waggamba	Shire	Goondiwindi	Darling Downs	1879	13,400.8	2,951	Amalgamated into Goondiwindi
Wambo	Shire	Dalby	Darling Downs	1879	5,709.7	5,178	Amalgamated into Western Downs
Warroo	Shire	Surat	Darling Downs	1881	13,657.4	1,095	Amalgamated into Maranoa
Warwick	Shire	Warwick	Darling Downs	1994	4,422.3	21,417	Amalgamated into Southern Downs
Whitsunday	Shire	Proserpine	North Queensland	1910	2,678.3	23,804	Amalgamated into Whitsunday
Wondai	Shire	Wondai	Wide Bay–Burnett	1910	3,577.6	4,375	Amalgamated into South Burnett
Woocoo	Shire	Oakhurst	Wide Bay–Burnett	1914	2,007.9	3,351	Amalgamated into Fraser Coast

== Local government areas amalgamated in the 1990s ==
LGA	Type	Seat	Region	Established	Area (km^{2})	Pop 1991	Notes
Albert	Shire	Nerang	South East	1949	1,223.8	143,697	Amalgamated into Gold Coast
Allora	Shire	Allora	Darling Downs	1869	702.0	2,132	Amalgamated into Warwick
Glengallan	Shire	Glengallan	Darling Downs	1879	1,699.6	2,132	Amalgamated into Warwick
Gooburrum	Shire	Bundaberg	Wide Bay–Burnett	1886	1,312.6	7,117	Amalgamated into Bundaberg/Burnett
Gympie	City	Gympie	Wide Bay–Burnett	1880	17.8	10,784	Amalgamated into Cooloola
Moreton	Shire	Churchill	South East	1916	1,787.8	46,722	Amalgamated into Ipswich
Mulgrave	Shire	Cairns	Far North	1879	2,820.1	40,614	Shire of Cairns until 1940. Amalgamated into Cairns
Pioneer	Shire	Mackay	Central Queensland	1879	2,820.1	40,614	Amalgamated into Mackay
Rosenthal	Shire	Rosenthal Heights	Darling Downs	1888	1,984.1	2,241	Amalgamated into Warwick
Warwick	City	Warwick	Darling Downs	1861	25.1	10,393	Amalgamated into Warwick
Widgee	Shire	Gympie	Wide Bay–Burnett	1879	2,906.8	17,059	Amalgamated into Cooloola
Woongarra	Shire	Bundaberg	Wide Bay–Burnett	1885	722.4	16,491	Amalgamated into Bundaberg/Burnett

== Amalgamations in 1948-9 ==
In 1948, the Queensland Government proposed three sets of LGA amalgamations: south of Brisbane, around Ipswich and around Toowoomba.

=== South Coast ===
On 9 December 1948, as part of a major reorganisation of local government in South East Queensland, an Order in Council replacing ten former local government areas between the City of Brisbane and the New South Wales border with only four. The Order came into effect on 10 June 1949, when the first elections were held.

LGA	Type	Seat	Region	Established	Area (km^{2})	Pop	Notes
Beenleigh	Shire		South East				Amalgamated into Albert
Cleveland	Shire		South East				Amalgamated into Redland
Coolangatta	Town		South East				Amalgamated into South Coast
Coomera	Town		South East				Amalgamated into Albert
Nerang (Burleigh Heads area)	Shire		South East				Amalgamated into South Coast
Nerang (except Burleigh Heads area)	Shire		South East				Amalgamated into Albert
Southport	Town		South East				Amalgamated into South Coast
Tamborine	Shire		South East				Amalgamated into Beaudesert
Tingalpa (northern part)	Shire		South East				Amalgamated into Redland
Tingalpa (southern part)	Shire		South East				Amalgamated into Albert
Waterford (western part)	Shire		South East				Amalgamated into Beaudesert
Waterford (eastern part)	Shire		South East				Amalgamated into Albert

== Amalgamations into Greater Brisbane in 1925 ==
LGA	Type	Seat	Region	Established	Abolished	Area (km^{2})	Notes
Balmoral	Shire		South East		1925		Amalgamated into City of Brisbane
Belmont	Shire		South East		1925		Amalgamated into City of Brisbane
Brisbane (former)	City	Brisbane CBD	South East	1859	1925		Amalgamated into City of Brisbane
Coorparoo	Shire		South East		1925		Amalgamated into City of Brisbane
Enoggera	Shire		South East		1925		Amalgamated into City of Brisbane
Hamilton	Town	Hamilton	South East	1890	1925		Amalgamated into City of Brisbane
Ithaca	Town	Ithaca	South East	1887	1925		Town in 1903. Amalgamated into City of Brisbane
Kedron	Shire		South East		1925		Amalgamated into City of Brisbane
Moggill	Shire		South East		1925		Amalgamated into City of Brisbane
Sandgate	Town	Sandgate	South East	1880	1925		Amalgamated into City of Brisbane
Sherwood	Shire		South East		1925		Amalgamated into City of Brisbane
South Brisbane	City	South Brisbane	South East	1888	1925		Amalgamated into City of Brisbane
Stephens	Shire		South East		1925		Amalgamated into City of Brisbane
Taringa	Shire		South East		1925		Amalgamated into City of Brisbane
Tingalpa (part of)	Shire		South East		1925		Amalgamated into City of Brisbane
Toombul	Shire		South East		1925		Amalgamated into City of Brisbane
Toowong	Town	Toowong	South East	1880	1925		Amalgamated into City of Brisbane
Windsor	Town	Windsor	South East	1887	1925		Amalgamated into City of Brisbane
Wynnum	Town	Wynnum	South East	1888	1925		Amalgamated into City of Brisbane
Yeerongpilly (part of)	Shire		South East		1925		Amalgamated into City of Brisbane

== Other former local government areas ==
LGA	Type	Seat	Region	Established	Abolished	Area (km^{2})	Notes
Adavale	Shire	Adavale	South West	1889	1930		Amalgamated into Quilpie, Murweh, Isisford and Barcoo
Allora	Town	Allora	Darling Downs	1869	1915		Abolished and recreated as Shire
Barron	Shire	Cairns	Far North	1890	1919		Amalgamated into Cairns and Woothakata
Beenleigh	Shire	Beenleigh	South East	1879	1948	260	Amalgamated into Albert
Bowen	Town	Bowen	North Queensland	1863	1960	12.3	Amalgamated into Shire of Bowen
Brassall	Shire	Brassall	South East	1879	1916		Amalgamated into Ipswich and Moreton
Bundanba	Shire	Bundamba	South East	1879	1916		Amalgamated into Ipswich and Moreton
Chillagoe	Shire	Chillagoe	Far North	1908	1932	4,005	Amalgamated into Woothakata
Cleveland	Shire	Cleveland	South East	1879	1948	73	Amalgamated into Redland
Cooktown	Town	Cooktown	Far North	1876	1932	39	Amalgamated into Cook
Coolangatta	Town	Coolangatta	South East	1914	1948	17	Amalgamated into Gold Coast
Coomera	Shire	Coomera	South East	1879	1948	305	Amalgamated into Albert and Beaudesert
Daintree	Shire	Daintree	Far North	1879	1919		Amalgamated into Cook
Drayton	Shire	Drayton	Darling Downs	1887	1949	140	Amalgamated into Toowoomba and Cambooya
Hann	Shire	Maytown	Far North	1879	1919		Amalgamated into Cook
Highfields	Shire	Highfields	Darling Downs	1879	1949	710	Amalgamated into Toowoomba and Crows Nest
Hughenden	Town	Hughenden	North West	1887	1958	67	Amalgamated into Flinders
Mutdapilly	Shire	Mutdapilly	South East	1879	1905		Amalgamated into Rosewood
Nerang	Shire	Nerang	South East	1879	1948	635	Amalgamated into Albert, Beaudesert and Gold Coast
Normanby	Shire	Normanby	South East	1890	1949	600	Amalgamated into Moreton and Boonah
Purga	Shire	Purga	South East	1879	1916		Amalgamated into Moreton
Rosewood	Shire	Rosewood	South East	1890	1949	635	Amalgamated into Moreton
Southport	Town	Southport	South East	1883	1948	105	Shire until 1918. Amalgamated into Gold Coast
Tamborine	Shire	Tamborine	South East	1890	1948	710	Amalgamated into Beaudesert
Thursday Island	Town	Thursday Island	Far North	1912	1952	3.2	Replaced by administrators
Tingalpa	Shire	Mount Cotton	South East	1879	1948	260	Amalgamated into Redland and Albert
Walsh	Shire	Irvinebank	Far North	1889	1932	8,490	Amalgamated into Woothakata
Walloon	Shire	Walloon	South East	1879	1916		Amalgamated into Rosewood
Wangaratta	Shire	Bowen	North Queensland	1879	1960	23,070	Amalgamated into Bowen
Waterford	Shire	Waterford	South East	1879	1948	350	Amalgamated into Albert and Beaudesert

== See also ==
- Local government areas of Queensland
- List of divisional boards in Queensland
