= List of divisional boards in Queensland =

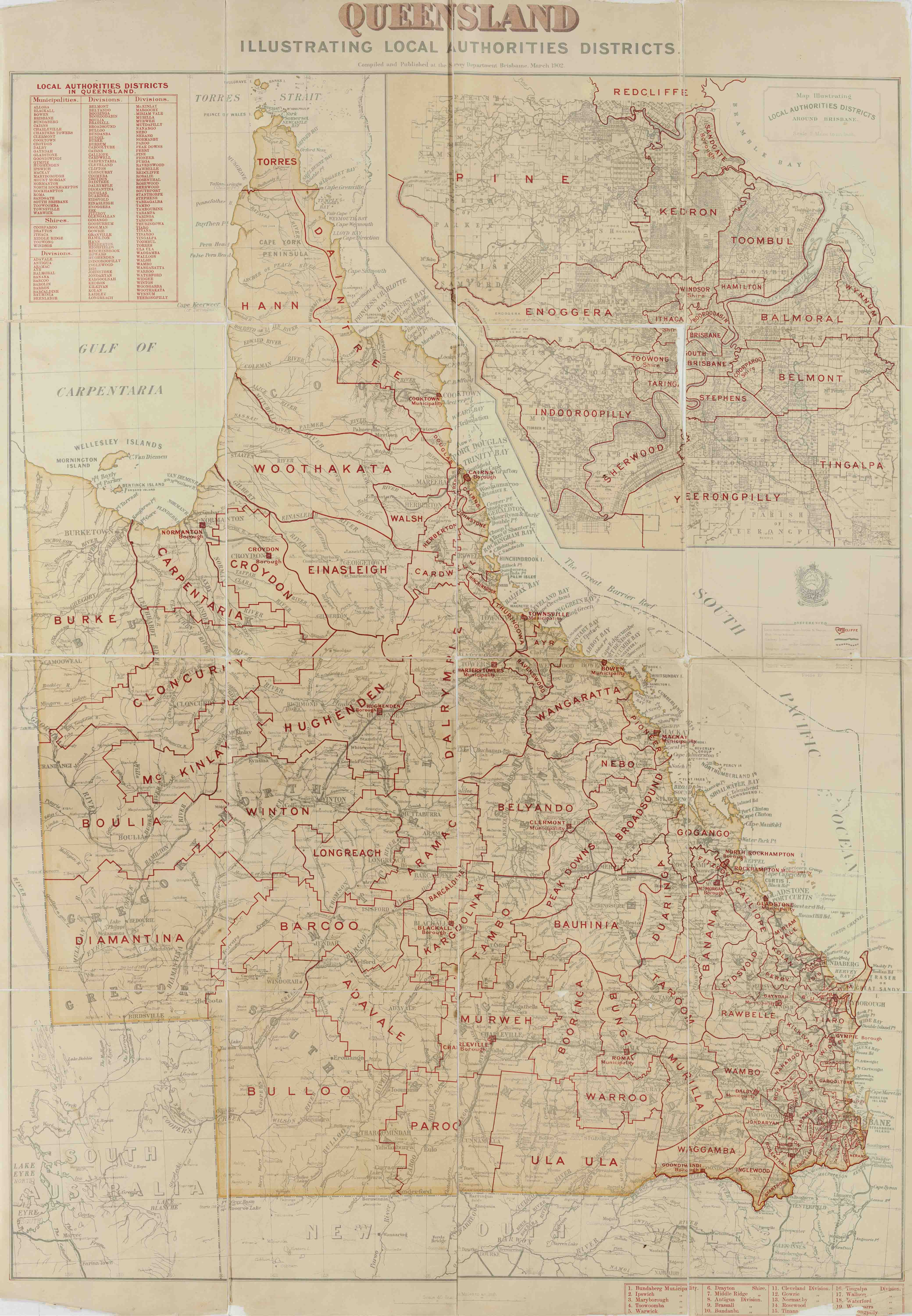
Local government areas (municipalities, shires and divisions) in Queensland, March 1902

This article provides a list of divisional boards in the Australian state of Queensland between 1879 and 1903.

When Queensland separated from New South Wales as a colony in its own right in 1859, it inherited New South Wales's local government legislation, the Municipalities Act 1858, which allowed the creation of a municipality with its own elected council to manage local affairs, upon the petition of householders in the area. However, by 1878 only eighteen towns had incorporated in this way. The Government of Queensland passed the Local Government Act 1878, based on Victorian legislation enacted four years earlier, to allow more diverse forms of local government, but this quickly proved unsuitable to Queensland's requirements given its large, sparsely populated areas.

Its response was to enact the Divisional Boards Act 1879 (43 Vic No. 17), which established a new form of local government by dividing all unincorporated parts of Queensland into 74 divisions, and creating for each an elected divisional board which was responsible for a range of services and amenities within its area. Each board had a number of councillors, and a chairman who was appointed from amongst their number. The legislation was amended several times before being replaced by the Divisional Boards Act 1887 (51 Vic No. 7). By 1901, there were 30 municipalities, 6 shires and 120 divisions in Queensland.

In 1902, the Local Authorities Act (2 Edw. VII, No. 19) replaced all divisions with shires and brought them under the same legislation as that which governed the municipalities. This took effect on 31 March 1903.

== Divisions created by the Act ==
On 11 November 1879, 74 divisions came into existence upon the proclamation of the Act:

Division	Office	Region	Notes
Antigua Division	Yengarie	Wide Bay–Burnett	
Aramac Division	Aramac	Central West Queensland	
Ballandean Division	Ballandean	Darling Downs	Amalgamated into Stanthorpe Division on 25 June 1880.
Banana Division	Banana	Central Queensland	
Barambah Division	Nanango	Wide Bay–Burnett	Renamed Nanango Division in 1888.
Barolin Division	Bundaberg	Wide Bay–Burnett	
Bauhinia Division	Springsure	Central Queensland	
Beenleigh Division	Beenleigh	South East Queensland	
Belyando Division	Clermont	Central Queensland	
Booroodabin Division	Newstead	Brisbane	Absorbed into Municipality of Brisbane on 13 January 1903.
Brassall Division	North Ipswich	South East Queensland	
Broadsound Division	St Lawrence	Central Queensland	
Bulimba Division	Carina	Brisbane	Renamed Belmont Division on 3 November 1894.
Bundaberg Division	Bundaberg	Wide Bay–Burnett	Abolished and recreated as Borough of Bundaberg on 22 April 1881 with same boundaries.
Bundanba Division	Ipswich	South East Queensland	
Burrum Division	Maryborough	Wide Bay–Burnett	
Caboolture Division	Caboolture	South East Queensland	
Cairns Division	Cairns (Esplanade)	Far North Queensland	
Calliope Division	Gladstone	Central Queensland	
Clifton Division	Allora	Darling Downs	
Coomera Division	Upper Coomera	South East Queensland	
Daintree Division	Cooktown	Far North Queensland	
Dalrymple Division	Charters Towers	North Queensland	
Diamantina Division	Birdsville	South West	
Doonmunya Division	Normanton	Gulf Country	Abolished and replaced by Carpentaria Division on 11 January 1883.
Durundur Division	Esk	South East Queensland	Renamed Esk Division on 2 June 1880.
Einasleigh Division	Georgetown	Far North Queensland	
Glastonbury Division	Gympie	Wide Bay–Burnett	Gympie area. Merged into Widgee Division in January 1895.
Glengallan Division	Warwick	Darling Downs	
Gogango Division	North Rockhampton	Central Queensland	
Goolman Division	Boonah	South East Queensland	
Gowrie Division	Drayton	Darling Downs	
Gympie Division	Gympie	Wide Bay–Burnett	Abolished and recreated as Borough of Gympie on 25 June 1880 with same boundaries.
Hann Division	Maytown	Far North Queensland	
Highfields Division	Toowoomba	Darling Downs	
Hinchinbrook Division	Ingham	North Queensland	
Inglewood Division	Inglewood	Darling Downs	
Ithaca Division	Brisbane CBD, then Enoggera	Brisbane	Renamed Enoggera Division on 28 March 1888.
Jondaryan Division	Toowoomba	Darling Downs	
Kargoolnah Division	Blackall	Central West Queensland	
Kolan Division	Gin Gin	Wide Bay–Burnett	
Murilla Division	Miles	Darling Downs	
Murweh Division	Charleville	South West	
Mutdapilly Division	Mount Walker	South East Queensland	
Nerang Division	Mudgeeraba	South East Queensland	
Nogoa Division		Central Queensland	Amalgamated late 1880s into Broadsound Division.
Nundah Division	Chermside	Brisbane	Renamed Kedron Division in 1901.
Paroo Division	Cunnamulla	South West	
Perry Division	Mount Perry	Wide Bay–Burnett	
Pioneer Division	Mackay	North Queensland	
Purga Division	Bundamba	South East Queensland	
Ravenswood Division	Ravenswood	Far North Queensland	
Rawbelle Division	Gayndah	Wide Bay–Burnett	
Rosalie Division		Darling Downs	
Stanthorpe Division	Stanthorpe	Darling Downs	
Tabragalba Division	Beaudesert	South East Queensland	
Tarampa Division	Gatton	South East Queensland	
Taroom Division	Taroom	Central Queensland	
Thuringowa Division	Townsville	North Queensland	
Tiaro Division	Tiaro	Wide Bay–Burnett	
Tinana Division	Tinana	Wide Bay–Burnett	
Tingalpa Division	Mount Cotton	South East Queensland	
Toowong Division	Toowong	Brisbane	Became Shire of Toowong on 20 May 1880.
Ula Ula Division	St George	South West	Renamed Balonne Division on 11 March 1901.
Waggamba Division	Goondiwindi	Darling Downs	
Walloon Division	Marburg	South East Queensland	
Wallumbilla Division	Mitchell	Darling Downs	Renamed Booringa Division on 18 July 1891.
Wambo Division	Dalby	Darling Downs	
Wangaratta Division	Bowen	North Queensland	
Warroo Division	Surat	Darling Downs	
Waterford Division	Waterford	South East Queensland	
Widgee Division	Gympie	Wide Bay–Burnett	
Woothakata Division	Thornborough	Far North Queensland	
Yeerongpilly Division	Rocklea	Brisbane	

== Divisions created subsequent to the Act ==
Name of division	Date created	Notes
Adavale Division	5 February 1889	Separated from Murweh Division
Ayr Division	16 January 1888	Separated from Thuringowa Division
Balmoral Division	19 January 1888	Separated from Bulimba Division
Barcaldine Division	25 August 1892	Separated from Kargoolnah Division
Barcoo Division	24 December 1887	Separated from Diamantina Division
Barron Division	20 December 1890	Separated from Tinaroo Division
Boulia Division	24 September 1887	
Bulloo Division	3 June 1880	Separated from Paroo Division
Bungil Division	21 May 1880	Separated from Wallumbilla Division
Burke Division	30 January 1885	Separated from Carpentaria Division
Cardwell Division	18 January 1884	Separated from Hinchinbrook Division
Carpentaria Division	11 January 1883	Replaced the abolished Doonmunya Division
Cleveland Division	29 May 1885	Separated from Tingalpa Division
Cloncurry Division	7 February 1884	Separated from Carpentaria Division
Croydon Division	31 December 1887	
Douglas Division	3 June 1880	Separated from Cairns Division
Duaringa Division	20 April 1881	Separated from Banana Division
Eidsvold Division	25 January 1890	
Emerald Division	4 June 1902	Separated from Peak Downs Division
Fitzroy Division	6 April 1899	Separated from Gogango Division
Gooburrum Division	28 January 1886	Separated from Kolan Division
Gregory Division	26 August 1880	Separated from Diamantina Division; abolished 22 November 1887.
Granville Division	14 September 1883	Separated from Tinana Division
Hamilton Division	2 October 1890	Separated from Toombul Division
Herberton Division	11 May 1895	Separated from Tinaroo Division; absorbed Borough of Herberton
Howard Division	30 June 1900	Separated from Isis Division
Hughenden Division	20 July 1882	Separated from Doonmunya Division
Ilfracombe Division	27 December 1902	Separated from Aramac Division
Indooroopilly Division	2 June 1880	Renaming of the remnants of former Toowong Division after the Shire of Toowong was split off
Isis Division	1 January 1887	Separated from Burrum Division
Johnstone Division	28 October 1881	Separated from Hinchinbrook Division
Kianawah Division	4 January 1888	Separated from Bulimba Division Renamed Wynnum Division 3 November 1892.
Kilkivan Division	1 July 1886	Separated from Widgee and Barambah Divisions, abolished 30 July 1886, re-constituted 17 November 1887
Laidley Division	25 April 1888	Separated from Tarampa Division
Longreach Division	9 May 1900	Separated from Aramac Division
Mackinlay Division	9 December 1891	Separated from Boulia and Cloncurry divisions
Maroochy Division	5 July 1890	Separated from Caboolture Division
Miriam Vale Division	7 January 1902	Separated from Calliope Division
Nebo Division	7 February 1883	Separated from Broadsound Division
Normanby Division	25 October 1890	Separated from Mutdapilly Division
Peak Downs Division	20 September 1884	Separated from Belyando Division
Pine Division	21 January 1888	Separated from Caboolture Division
Redcliffe Division	7 April 1888	Separated from Caboolture Division
Rosenthal Division	18 April 1889	Separated from Inglewood Division
Rosewood Division	25 October 1890	Separated from Walloon Division
Sherwood Division	24 January 1891	Separated from Yeerongpilly Division
Southport Division	6 July 1883	Separated from Coomera and Nerang Divisions
Stephens Division	16 October 1886	Separated from Yeerongpilly Division
Tambo Division	30 June 1881	Separated from Kargoolnah Division
Tambourine Division	4 October 1890	Separated from Tabragalba Division
Taringa Division	11 October 1890	Separated from Indooroopilly Division
Tinaroo Division	2 September 1881	Formerly parts of Cairns, Hinchinbrook and Woothakata divisions
Toombul Division	1 November 1883	Separated from Nundah Division
Torres Division	30 October 1885	Covered Thursday Island, Separated from Hann Division
Walsh Division	15 May 1889	Separated from Woothakata Division
Shire of Windsor	11 February 1887	Separated from Ithaca Division
Winton Division	23 September 1886	Separated from Aramac Division
Woolloongabba Division	9 January 1880	Abolished 7 January 1888, merged into new Borough of South Brisbane
Woongarra Division	30 October 1885	Separated from Barolin Division

== See also ==
- List of former local government areas of Queensland
