= Shire of Moreton =

Coordinates: 27°38′34″S 152°45′01.5″E

- Local government area
- Country: Australia
- State: Queensland
- Region: South East Queensland
- Established: 1917
- Council seat: Churchill

The Shire of Moreton was a local government area in South East Queensland, Australia, located about 50 kilometres (31 mi) southwest of Queensland's capital, Brisbane. It represented an area surrounding but not including Ipswich, and existed from 1917 until 1995, when it merged into the City of Ipswich, City of Brisbane, and Shire of Esk.

== History ==
In 1879, the Divisional Boards Act was passed, allowing boards to be created to provide amenities and charge rates, but with limited independence. In a proclamation on 11 November 1879, a number of Divisions were proclaimed in the Ipswich area—Brassall, Bundanba, Mutdapilly, Purga and Walloon. On 25 October 1890, Normanby Division and Rosewood Division followed. The Local Authorities Act 1902 abolished the divisional boards, replacing them with shire or town councils with the same powers plus the jurisdiction to create by-laws.

On 31 March 1903, its provisions took effect, replacing the above divisions with the Shires of Brassall, Bundanba, Mutdapilly, Normanby, Purga, Rosewood and Walloon. On 4 July 1905, Shire of Mutdapilly merged into the Shire of Rosewood.

=== The Greater Ipswich Scheme of 1916 ===
On 13 October 1916, a rationalisation of the local government areas in and around Ipswich was implemented. It involved the abolition of five shires:

- Brassall
- Bundanba
- Lowood
- Purga
- Walloon

resulting in:

- a new Shire of Ipswich by amalgamating part of the Shire of Brassall, part of the Shire of Bundanba, part of the Shire of Walloon and all of the Shire of Purga
- an enlarged Shire of Rosewood by including part of the Shire of Walloon
- an enlarged City of Ipswich by including part of the Shire of Brassall and part of the Shire of Bundanba
- an enlarged Shire of Esk by including all of the Shire of Lowood

=== Establishment of the Shire of Moreton ===
The Shire of Ipswich was renamed Shire of Moreton on 28 July 1917.

In 1926, the Shire of Moreton was enlarged to include parts of the City of Ipswich and the Shire of Waterford.

Its boundaries were extended on 16 August 1930 to include part of the Shire of Waterford.

=== Greater Ipswich Scheme of 1949 ===
On 29 January 1949, a new Local Government Act was enacted to further amalgamate local government in the Ipswich area, abolishing the Shires of Normanby and Rosewood. The City of Ipswich was enlarged to include the more urban parts of the Shire of Moreton. The Shire of Moreton was then enlarged by the inclusion of the northern part of the Shire of Normanby and all the Shire of Rosewood. The southern part of the Shire of Normanby was transferred to an enlarged Shire of Boonah.

=== Period of stability ===
Council meetings were held in Ipswich until 4 March 1961, when they moved to Churchill.

In 1988, the shire had a population of about 38,000 people and covered an area of 1813 square kilometres.

=== Abolition ===
On 22 March 1995, the Shire merged into the City of Ipswich, as part of an effort to reform local government and create "super-cities". This occurred at the same time as the Shire of Albert merging into the City of Gold Coast, and the Shire of Mulgrave merging into the City of Cairns. The Shire or Moreton's final chairman, John Nugent, won the mayorship of the combined City of Ipswich and continued to lead for another nine years.

== Wards ==
Initially, the Shire of Moreton had six divisions each with two councillors, and the Shire of Rosewood had four divisions with three representing the first, and two representing each of the others.

After the 1949 amalgamation, Moreton was resubdivided into three divisions with a chairman and 10 council members:

- one being the remnants of Shire of Moreton after the losses to the City of Ipswich (3 council members)
- one being the former Shire of Rosewood (4 council members)
- one being the northern part of the former Shire of Normanby (3 council members)

By 1988, there were 4 divisions:

- No. 1 Division covered the areas north of Ipswich including: Glamorganvale, Mount Crosby, Lake Manchester, Marburg, Pine Mountain, Karalee, Karana Downs and part of Fernvale (the rest of Fernvale was in the Shire of Esk).
- No. 2 Division covered areas west of Ipswich including: Grandchester, Walloon and Rosewood (the largest town in the shire).
- No. 3 Division covered the areas south-west of Ipswich including: Rosevale, Munbilla, Warrill View, Harrisville, Peak Crossing, Yamanto, Loamside, Flinders View, Ripley and Willowbank.
- No. 4 Division covered areas south of Ipswich, including: Redbank Plains, Bellbird Park, Camira and Carole Park.

== Population ==
Year	Population
1954	8,525
1961	8,506
1966	8,406
1971	8,735
1976	14,903
1986	37,266
1991	46,722

== Chairmen ==
The chairmen of the shire were:

Chairman	Term
1988–1995	John Nugent
1979–1988	Neil Russell
1961–1979	Albert George Victor Hall
1958–1961	Henry Hayes
1955–1958	Archibald Wilfred Johnston
1952–1955	Richard Thomas Morgan
1949–1952	Archibald Wilfred Johnston
1930–1948	Richard Thomas Morgan
1921–1930	Henry Lewis Jones
1920–1921	John McGuire
1918–1919	Hugh Hallett
1917	Henry Lewis Jones
