= Mutdapilly State School =

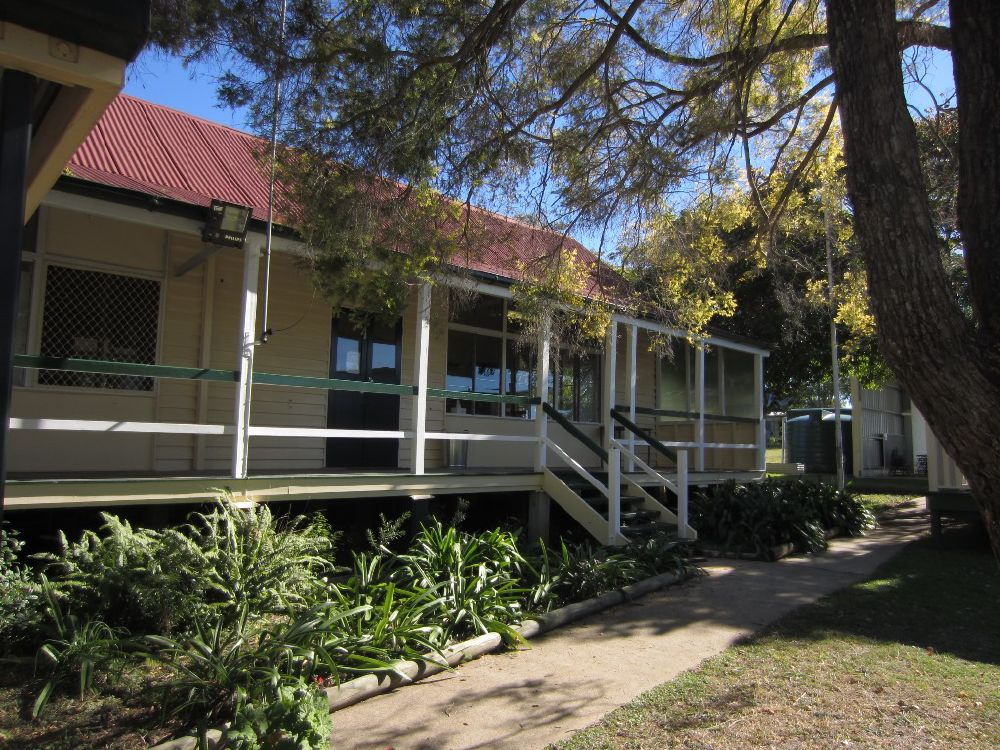
- Mutdapilly State School, 2014

- Location within Queensland
- 27.7705°S 152.6507°E
- Location: 4 Mutdapilly-Churchbank Weir Road, Mutdapilly, Queensland, Australia

History
- Built: 1874–1880, Suter Building; 1925, Tennis Court; 1928, Playshed

Site notes
- Architect: Richard George Suter

Queensland Heritage Register
- Official name: Mutdapilly State School; Normanby National School
- Type: state heritage
- Designated: 10 October 2014
- Reference no.: 602840
- Type: Education, research, scientific facility: School-state
- Theme: Educating Queenslanders: Providing primary schooling
- Builders: William Adams, Ben Denman

Mutdapilly State School is a heritage-listed state school at 4 Mutdapilly-Churchbank Weir Road, Mutdapilly, Scenic Rim Region, Queensland, Australia. It was designed by Richard George Suter and built from 1874 to 1880 by William Adams and Ben Denman. It is also known as Normanby National School. It was added to the Queensland Heritage Register on 10 October 2014.

== History ==
Mutdapilly State School opened in 1874 as Normanby National School (Normanby State School from 1875), in a small timber building designed by architect Richard George Suter. It was built on a 2-acre (0.81 ha) site, at an intersection on the main road through the agricultural settlement of Mutdapilly, to service the sparse but growing rural population. The Suter building was extended in 1880, and the school grounds were also expanded and other structures and landscape elements were added, including a tennis court (1925); a new playshed (c. 1928), and shade trees. The school has been in continuous operation since its establishment and has been a focus for the local community as a place for important social and cultural activities.

Traditionally the land of the Yuggera people, closer European settlement of the Mutdapilly area began in the early 1860s. Mutdapilly State School is located on the former Ipswich Agricultural Reserve, which was formed in 1860 from 11,000 acres (4,500 ha) of land resumed from pastoral runs either side of Warrill Creek. The land west of Warrill Creek was part of George Thorn's pastoral run "Normanby" (formerly "Rosebrook"). The first land sales in the reserve took place in April 1861, and a number of German settlers arrived in the district during the 1860s. Most selectors in the reserve during this decade grew cotton, although this industry faded in the 1870s. Other crops, grazing, and dairying then became the primary industries of the area. The Mutdapilly Divisional Board was established in 1879 and the Normanby Divisional Board (later Normanby Shire Council) was formed, out of part of the Mutdapilly Division, in 1890.

Normanby National School was established at Mutdapilly as one of an expanding network of state-run primary schools. The provision of state-administered education was important to the colonial governments of Australia. In 1848 the New South Wales Government established National Schools. This was continued by the Queensland Government after the colony's separation in 1859. The Education Act 1860 established the Queensland Board of General Education and began to standardise curriculum, teacher training, and facilities. The State Education Act 1875 provided for the further key initiatives of free, compulsory and secular primary education and established the Department of Public Instruction to administer the Act. This move standardised the provision of education and, despite difficulties, colonial educators achieved a remarkable feat in bringing basic literacy to most Queensland children by 1900.

The establishment of schools was considered an essential step in the development of early communities and integral to their success. Locals often donated land and labour for a school's construction and the school community contributed to maintenance and development. Schools became a major community focus for social interaction, a symbol of progress and a source of pride with enduring connections formed with past pupils, parents and teachers. The inclusion of war memorials and halls used for community purposes reinforced these connections together with fetes, markets, public holiday celebrations, school break-up days, fundraisers, polling days, sporting events, reunions, and dances, all held within the schools' buildings and grounds.

From the 1860s until the 1960s, Queensland school buildings were predominantly timber framed, taking advantage of the material's abundance in the state and the high number of builders skilled in its use. This also allowed for easy and economical construction and enabled the government to provide facilities in remote areas. Due to the standardisation of facilities, schools across the state were developed in distinctly similar ways and became complexes of typical components. These components included: the teaching building/s, the school yard, the sports oval, the head teacher's residence, and a variety of landscape elements such as sporting facilities or play equipment, playsheds, gardens and trees.

In 1873, 2 acres (0.81 ha) of Portion 20 (originally 79 acres (32 ha)) was donated by Joseph Denman for a school at Mutdapilly, while the local community raised their share of the cost to construct a teaching building, teacher's residence, playshed and buggy shed. Builder William Adam's tender of £289 was accepted in 1873 and the Normanby National School opened on 27 April 1874. There were 19 students present on the first day; 35 were enrolled by June 1874, and 56 by November 1874. The school grounds acted as a site for the postal service's Receiving Office from 1876, and the school was known as the Normanby State School by 1877.

The Board of General Education preferred that national school buildings were single storey, but had no other architectural stipulations. Consequently, the buildings varied depending on the architect responsible. The teaching building at Normanby National School was designed by Richard Suter (1827–1894), a private architect commissioned from 1865 by the Board of General Education to design school buildings. From 1868, Suter was responsible for most of the Board's buildings. Although Suter's Brisbane school buildings were of brick construction, in rural areas he designed timber-framed school buildings. In his timber school designs, Suter incorporated an "outside studding" construction technique he was developing, whereby a building with timber stud framing was clad only internally, creating a distinctive exterior of exposed framing similar in appearance to half-timbered construction. Suter is credited with being the first to use this technique in Queensland. Outside studding for school architecture was continued by Suter's successors for another 50 years.

As in other Australian colonies, the Queensland Government developed standard plans for its school buildings to help to ensure consistency and economy. Prior to, and during Suter's first years, schools were individually designed but conformed to the space requirements set by the Board. In 1869 a "recommended plan" for provisional schools was created by Suter that was generic and could be used on any site. It was a lowset structure with gable roof, rectangular in plan with a small porch. An "improved plan" developed in 1873 addressed criticisms by Inspectors that the heat inside classrooms was "unbearable". It comprised a single large room with a front and back verandah, providing weather protection and sheltered play and teaching space. It was the beginning of a distinctive design, where the circulation to classrooms was via a verandah, continuing until at least the 1960s.

Although Suter did not intend this plan to be used broadly, the Board of Education, who were faced with an increasing population and limited budget, disseminated it throughout Queensland. As a result, Suter's designs had wide distribution. This had considerable impact on the spread of outside studding as a building technique in Queensland and may have been the main influence in its quick acceptance and use as a vernacular building form throughout the Colony.

The reuse of designs diminished the need to pay Suter additional architectural fees and the relationship between Suter and the government became strained. Suter continued as approved architect until 1875 when he was replaced. Around 65 timber school buildings were constructed to Suter's standard type. Of these, only three (Waterford State School, Morayfield State School, and Mutdapilly State School) are largely intact.

The teaching building at Normanby was typical of Suter's improved plan. It was a lowset timber building and its walls consisted of pine chamfered boards with external hardwood studding. The building faced west, with 7.25-foot (2.21 m) wide verandahs on the east and west sides, and accommodated one large room 30 by 16 feet (9.1 m × 4.9 m). There was a wash basin and hat room on the rear verandah, with a "shelf for dinner". The gable roof was clad with hardwood shingles, the roof framing was exposed internally and the few windows were small.

Enrolments grew quickly at the school, doubling to 70 in five years. Around 1880 the Suter building was extended to the south by 21 feet (6.4 m) forming a separate classroom. The extension was similar in form and detail to the original portion but was not lined internally. Rather, it was clad externally, marking a shift in the preferred construction technique from external to internal stud framing. By 1887 the partition between the classrooms was attacked by termites and may have been removed at this time.

A photograph of the Suter building taken in 1896 shows the exposed stud framing of the eastern (rear) verandah wall had been lined, suggesting that all external walls may have been clad when the 1880 extension was built. This could have resulted from the need for weatherproofing or to arrest deterioration at the cross joints, recognised problems of the outside studding technique. A photograph taken c.1910 shows a similar view with sets of four horizontal pivot windows on each side of the door. Either these did not appear in the 1896 photograph because of the angle of the photograph, or they were installed at a later date. It is possible that the back wall of the Suter building did not have windows, given the seating gallery inside. A photograph of the front (west) of the school c.1915 shows the front verandah wall clad to cover up the originally exposed stud framing and no windows in the north (1874) gable.

Suter's standard designs were continually refined by his successors in response to changing needs and educational philosophy. Suter's designs were not without problems - in particular, they were criticised for lack of ventilation. Later school architects focussed intently on improving climate control, lighting and ventilation and were particularly innovative in their responses.

In 1907, the Suter building at Mutdapilly had its roof shingles replaced with corrugated galvanised iron. A coved ceiling was installed in the classroom following the line of the collar tie of the rafters, leaving the tie at the top of the walls exposed, and a raked ceiling was installed in the verandahs. A drawing of this work shows the building lowset, with a gallery for desks and seating on the eastern side of the room. The front elevation had two doors from the front verandah and three windows with low sills each apparently containing two sashes. The spacing of these windows in the wall suggests that they are the original 1874 windows symmetrically arranged each side of the door and an additional matching set added with the 1880 extension.

Besides changes to the Suter building, there were other changes at the school. In 1914–15 the school purchased 1 acre (0.40 ha) of land to the north from Norman Joseph Denman; and the school committee eventually succeeded in having the new area fenced in 1920. The school's 50th jubilee was celebrated on 28 April 1924 with a banquet and dance held within the Suter building, attended by past pupils and residents; similarly, the school's 60th, 70th, and 80th jubilees were celebrated in 1934, 1944, and 1954.

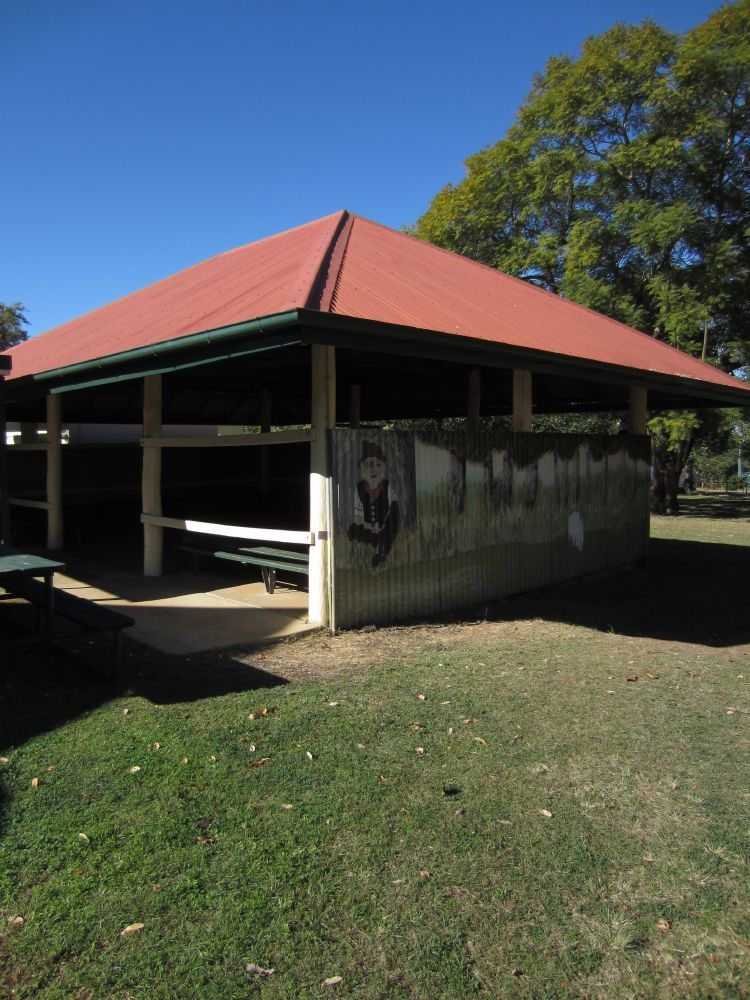
Playshed, 2014

The grounds of Normanby school included outdoor play areas and structures. The Queensland education system recognised the importance of play in the school curriculum and, as well as classrooms, they provided plans for playsheds, free-standing shelters that provided covered play space and were often used for unofficial teaching space when needed. They were timber-framed structures, generally open on all sides although were sometimes partially enclosed with timber boards or corrugated galvanised iron sheets. The hipped (or less frequently, gabled) roofs were clad with timber shingles or corrugated iron and they had an earth or decomposed granite floor. Fixed timber seating ran between the perimeter posts. Playsheds were a typical addition to state schools across Queensland between c. 1880s and the 1950s. They were built to standard designs that ranged in size relative to student numbers. School sites were typically cleared of all vegetation and the provision of all-weather outdoor space was needed.

By the 1920s, Mutdapilly was part of a booming dairy farming region. In 1924 the original 1874 playshed was still in use, but soon after (c.1928), a new playshed was erected. This incorporated some of the roof framing of its predecessor and was built to the south of the Suter building. Pat Collins and Joe [Norman] Denman donated posts for the new shed, which was built by Mr Hall and Ben Denman for $250. The local community raised half the money needed for a 2000-gallon (9092 litre) tank for the shed, with the government providing the other half.

Trees and gardens were also planted as part of beautification of the school. In the 1870s, schools inspector William Boyd was critical of tropical schools and amongst his recommendations was the importance of adding shade trees to playgrounds. Arbor Day celebrations began in Queensland in 1890 and were occurring at Mutdapilly State School at least one year before 1897.

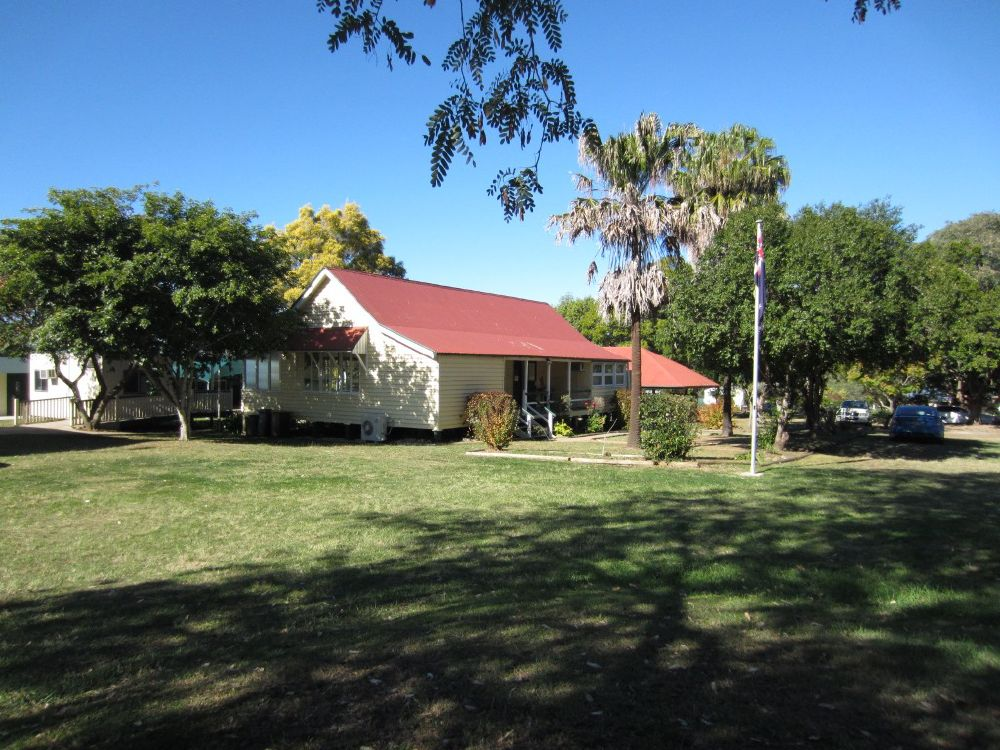
Gardens at Mutdapilly State School, 2014

Educationalists believed gardening and Arbor Days instilled in young minds the value of hard work and activity, improved classroom discipline, developed aesthetic tastes, and inspired people to stay on the land. Aesthetically designed gardens were encouraged by regional inspectors. In 1897, Normanby School was praised by the Inspector for its well-kept grounds and in 1914 it was "in the small list of schools whose grounds strikingly illustrated perseverance and determination in successfully overcoming difficulties". In the Annual Prizes for School Gardens, Normanby received third place in 1916. The school has planted many indigenous and exotic trees as a result of Arbor Day celebrations.

The growth of Mutdapilly remained limited, so only minor increases in student accommodation were needed. By the 1920s the verandahs of the Suter building were ceiled, and the south end of the front (west) verandah was enclosed for a library 10 feet (3.0 m) long. In 1931 the interior of the 1880s portion was re-lined.

A tennis court was built northwest of the Suter building, on the land purchased c.1915, and a working bee in July 1925 saw significant work completed, including carting antbed and the erection of the majority of the posts. The tennis court was formally opened on Arbor Day in August 1925.

During the 1920s and 1930s alterations were made to the vast majority of older school buildings to upgrade their lighting and ventilation. Achieving an ideal or even adequate level of natural light in classrooms, without glare, was of critical importance to educators and became central to the design and layout of all school buildings from 1900. Windows were rearranged and enlarged to provide a greater amount of gentle, southern light into the room. Desks were rearranged so that the light would fall onto students' left sides to avoid throwing shadows onto the pages; this presupposed that all students would be right-handed. The change in philosophy often meant a complete transformation of the fenestration of existing buildings. Interiors became lighter and airier and met with immediate approval from educators. This was a noticeable new direction and the better lit and ventilated form became a characteristic of Queensland schools.

At Normanby State School, the Suter building was altered to improve lighting and ventilation in the 1920s. The two narrow windows in the northern and southern gable walls were replaced with new, larger, casement windows to improve lighting conditions internally. Then in 1931, these were replaced with a substantial area of casement windows with higher sill heights and new sunshades. Further, in 1933 additional casement windows inserted into the eastern verandah wall to increase the lighting and ventilation of the interior.

Although electricity was available in the district from the 1950s, it was not connected to the school until March 1967. In 1954, the Normanby School obtained a radiogram, powered by a 6 volt battery, to be used for the ABC's "radio-film" broadcasts, particularly valuable for geography and nature studies. In that same year, two palm trees were planted west of the school building, and the school celebrated their 80th anniversary with a luncheon and afternoon tea in the playshed, and later a dance in the school.

Between the 1960s and the 1980s Queensland education was reformed. The Education Act 1964 was a turning point and the first major update of Queensland education's governing legislation since 1875. Effectively, a new era of state education evolved requiring new architectural responses. The Department of Education (as it had been renamed in 1957) continued to give the responsibility of building design to the architects of the Department of Public Works. With new educational philosophies, government policies and functional requirements combined with new architectural styles, materials and technologies, the evolution of standard designs became more fragmented. Rather than "improving" on the previous designs, architects began to design with inspiration drawn from new precedents. Fundamentally, timber construction was no longer favoured and buildings were no longer predominantly highset.

On 1 April 1968 the school was renamed Mutdapilly State School. Prior to this, there was a large sign in front of the school reading, "NORMANBY STATE SCHOOL" which created confusion for visitors to the Mutdapilly area. Much of the mail addressed to "Normanby State School" was also often delivered to Red Hill post office in Brisbane, with postal authorities presumably thinking there was a school near the Normanby Hotel there.

During the third term of 1968 the teaching building was restumped with concrete stumps. The one large room was made into two equal size rooms by the provision of large folding doors. The library/storeroom on the front verandah was expanded and had hopper windows installed. In the back verandah wall were inserted new banks of louvres and new doors. The cladding of the hat room on the rear verandah was replaced by Georgian wired glass panels and the back wall of the hat room at the south end of the verandah was removed. The school's old post and rail fence was also replaced by a tubular steel and chain wire fence.

On the school's centenary celebrations on 27 April 1974, a commemorative tree was planted by the oldest pupil. By this time the school had an attendance of 39 pupils - compared to the 35 in 1874. The north end of the front verandah of the school was enclosed in 1977 to accommodate a store room.

In 1990 a new teaching building was constructed to the east of the Suter building, and in 1995 the grounds were extended to the north and east, with the creation of a new allotment of 5.37 hectares (13.3 acres) (which incorporated the one acre c.1915 extension to the school, but not the originally donated 2 acres (0.81 ha), which remains as a separate allotment); allowing room for a school oval. In 1999 a modular building was erected to the south of the 1990 building, and between 2006 and 2009 a Building the Education Revolution hall was constructed north of Suter building. In 2009 the school had 50 pupils.

In 2014, the school retains the Suter building, the c.1928 playshed, the 1925 tennis court and mature Arbor Day plantings. The school is important to the town and district, having operated since 1874 and taught generations of Mutdapilly students. Since establishment it has been a key social focus for the Mutdapilly community, with the grounds and buildings having been the location of many social events over time.

== Description ==
Mutdapilly State School stands on an elevated 6.18-hectare (15.3-acre) site on the Cunningham Highway, Mutdapilly. The school comprises a number of small buildings, a tennis court and established trees, which are located on the 3-acre (1.2 ha) portion of the site that constituted the school until 1995. Mutdapilly State School is a landmark in its rural setting along the highway.

Set well back from and facing the highway is the Suter designed building (1874 with 1880 extension), a one-storey, lowset, timber-framed building clad with weatherboards and sheltered by a gable roof lined with corrugated metal sheets. The verandahs front (west) and back (east) are accessed by one short flight of timber stairs from the front verandah and two from the back verandah. The verandahs have raked ceilings lined with v-jointed timber boards and a timber rail balustrade between stop-chamfered timber posts extends along the front and back perimeters.

The front verandah has enclosed sections at both ends: the northern enclosure is an early store room accessed from the verandah; and the southern enclosure is a 1960s library with timber-framed awning windows and is accessed from the interior. The rear verandah retains the original hat room enclosure at the southern end and a 1960s wired glass enclosure at the northern end. The front verandah retains two sets of original timber-framed casement windows (one is boarded over inside the northern store room).

The northern and southern gable ends have tall, timber-framed casement windows sheltered by a timber-framed hood with battened cheeks. Most windows have internal timber architraves and retain early hardware. Elements that are not of cultural heritage significance include the verandah doors, the large banks of glass louvre windows and security screens attached to windows in the rear verandah wall.

In 2014 it is used as an administration building. The interior layout comprises two rooms, separated by timber partitions and a small, central room. The part-height timber partition of the southern room is not of cultural heritage significance. The walls of the northern 1874 classroom are lined with wide horizontal timber boards. Vertical-jointed timber boards clad the walls of the southern 1880 extension, as well as the coved ceiling of all three rooms. Timber tie beams are exposed within the spaces.

The playshed stands south of the Suter designed building. The timber-framed shelter has a concrete floor and a hipped roof clad with corrugated metal sheets. Ten timber posts support the roof and are roughly-finished timber logs. The northern side of the shelter is open and the other three sides are enclosed with corrugated metal sheets.

The school grounds are well established and include many mature trees. Two fan palms (Livistona australis) featured on the school logo stand either side of the front entrance of the Suter building. Other established trees line the boundaries of the site. The tennis court (1925) is located northwest of the Suter building. It has a modern surface and is surrounded by a high chain wire fence.

The other buildings and structures within the cultural heritage boundary are not of cultural heritage significance.

== Heritage listing ==
Mutdapilly State School was listed on the Queensland Heritage Register on 10 October 2014 having satisfied the following criteria.

The place is important in demonstrating the evolution or pattern of Queensland's history.

Mutdapilly State School (established in 1874 as Normanby National School) is important in demonstrating the evolution of state education, and its associated architecture, in Queensland. The place retains excellent, representative examples of standard government designs that were architectural responses to prevailing government educational philosophies. The teaching building (1874), designed by architect Richard Suter, is an early standardised design; and the playshed (c.1928), demonstrates the education system's recognition of the importance of play in the curriculum.

The mature trees around the school are a result of the policies of promoting school beatification, providing shade trees, and encouraging students' work ethic through Arbor Day plantings.

The place demonstrates rare, uncommon or endangered aspects of Queensland's cultural heritage.

The Suter building at Mutdapilly State School is rare as one of three known surviving intact examples of the approximately 65 buildings of this type constructed.

The place is important in demonstrating the principal characteristics of a particular class of cultural places.

Mutdapilly State School is important in demonstrating the principal characteristics of early Queensland state schools, including standard building designs by the Queensland Government.

The Suter building retains the characteristics of its original design. It is single-skin timber-framed and lowset, with front and rear verandahs and a single classroom that is well ventilated and day-lit. Changing philosophies in state primary education are evident in the modifications made to this building, including enlarged windows, and the change in cladding at the time of the 1880 extension reflected the move away from external stud framing.

The playshed has a hipped timber-framed roof form supported on timber posts.

The place has a strong or special association with a particular community or cultural group for social, cultural or spiritual reasons.

Queensland schools have always played an important part in Queensland communities. They typically retain a significant and enduring connection with former pupils, their parents, and teachers; provide a venue for social interaction and volunteer work; and are a source of pride, symbolising local progress and aspirations. Mutdapilly State School has a strong and ongoing association with the Mutdapilly community. It was established in 1874 through the fund-raising efforts of the local community and has educated generations of Mutdapilly children. The place is important for its contribution to the educational development of Mutdapilly and is a prominent community focal point and gathering place for social events with widespread community support.

== See also ==
- List of schools in West Moreton
- History of state education in Queensland
