= Normanby =

Normanby could be:

== Places ==
=== Australia ===
- Normanby, Queensland
- Normanby Division, a local government area in Queensland
- Shire of Normanby, a local government area in Queensland
- Normanby Island (Queensland)
- Electoral district of Normanby (disambiguation), Queensland
- Normanby River, third largest river in Australia and largest Australian river to the Pacific
- County of Normanby, Victoria

=== Canada ===
- Normanby Township, Ontario, a disbanded township in Grey County, Ontario

=== New Zealand ===
- Normanby, Otago, a suburb of Dunedin
- Normanby, Taranaki, a small town in Taranaki

=== Papua New Guinea ===
- Normanby Island, Papua New Guinea

=== United Kingdom ===
- Normanby, Redcar and Cleveland, North Yorkshire, home of Normanby Hall
- Normanby, Whitby, North Yorkshire
- Normanby, Ryedale, North Yorkshire
- Normanby, North Lincolnshire, home of Normanby Hall
- Normanby by Spital
- Normanby by Stow
- Normanby le Wold

== Other ==
- Marquess of Normanby
