= Shire of Lowood =

Local government area of Queensland, Australia

Coordinates: 27.467°S 152.57°E

The Shire of Lowood is a former local government area in the south-east of Queensland, Australia. It existed between 1912 and 1916.

== History ==
From around 1890, increasing settlement in and around the town of Lowood resulted in ongoing agitation to establish a new shire.

An alternative proposal was to relocate the office of the Shire of Walloon away from Marburg and into Lowood on the grounds that the majority of the population of the Shire of Walloon used Lowood as their market town and that Lowood had the advantage of being on the railway line (which Marburg was not). In November 1907, the decision was made to relocate the office to Lowood, which was rescinded in the following month. The issue continued to be argued for some time, with petitions and counter-petitions. However, once it became clear the office would not be relocated to Lowood, the Lowood area residents resumed their push for the establishment of a separate shire. Eventually, on 19 January 1912, under the Local Authorities Act 1902, part of the Shire of Walloon was excised to create the Shire of Lowood.

=== The Greater Ipswich Scheme ===
On 13 October 1916, a rationalisation of the local government areas in and around Ipswich was implemented. It involved the abolition of five shires:

- Brassall
- Bundanba
- Lowood
- Purga
- Walloon

resulting in:

- an enlarged Shire of Esk by including all of the Shire of Lowood
- an enlarged Shire of Rosewood by including part of the Shire of Walloon
- a new Shire of Ipswich by amalgamating part of the Shire of Brassall, part of the Shire of Bundanba, part of the Shire of Walloon and all of the Shire of Purga
- an enlarged City of Ipswich by including part of the Shire of Brassall and part of the Shire of Bundanba
