= Shire of Boonah =

- Local government area
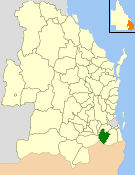
- Location within Queensland

- Country: Australia
- State: Queensland
- Region: South East Queensland
- Established: 1880
- Council seat: Boonah

Area
  - Total: 1,921.6 km^{2} (741.9 sq mi)

Population
  - Total: 8,770 (2006 census)
  - Density: 4.5639/km^{2} (11.820/sq mi)
- Website: Shire of Boonah
LGAs around Shire of Boonah
Laidley	Ipswich	Ipswich
Warwick	Shire of Boonah	Beaudesert
Tenterfield (NSW)	Tenterfield (NSW)	Kyogle (NSW)

The Shire of Boonah was a local government area in South East Queensland, Australia, about 80 kilometres (50 mi) southwest of Brisbane. The shire covered an area of 1,921.6 square kilometres (741.9 sq mi), and existed from 1880 until its merger with parts of the Shire of Beaudesert and City of Ipswich to form the Scenic Rim Region on 15 March 2008.

The shire was part of the "Scenic Rim", a group of mountain ranges forming part of the Great Dividing Range, and contained four national parks—Main Range, Mount French, Moogerah Peaks and Mount Greville National Park which is now part of Moogerah Peaks National Park.

== History ==
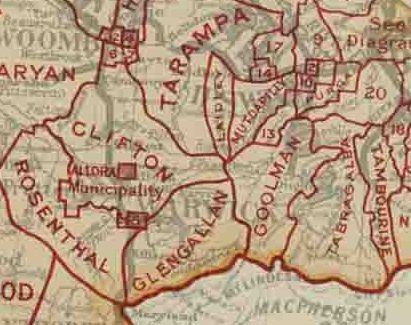
Map of Goolman Division and adjacent local government areas, March 1902. Legend: Normanby Division (13), Yeerongpilly Division (20)

The Goolman Division was incorporated on 11 November 1879 under the Divisional Boards Act 1879 with a population of 1,542. It was centred on Boonah and its board consisting of six councillors. On 4 January 1884, there was an adjustment of boundaries between No. 2 subdivision of Mutdapilly Division and subdivision No. 2 of the Goolman Division. Initially, the Goolman Division had its office in Flinders (27°46′59″S 152°42′59″E). However, in 1887, the railway line from Ipswich was extended to Boonah, and the Goolman Division office moved to Boonah.

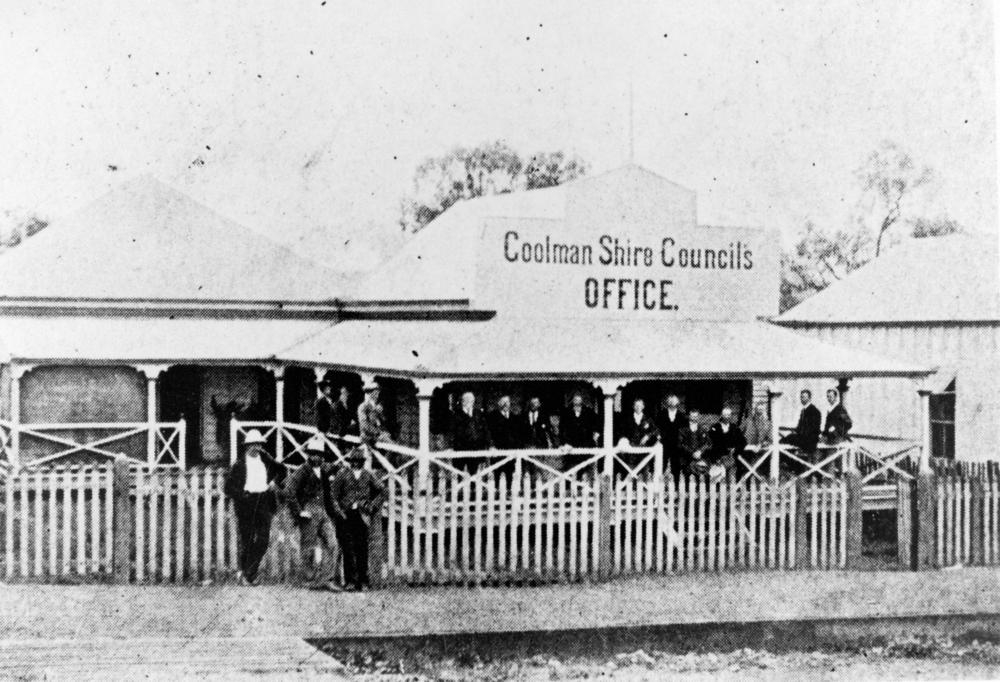
Goolman Shire Council's Office and Shire Clerk's residence, 1903

On 25 October 1890, part of the northern section of Goolman Division became part of the new Normanby Division. With the passage of the Local Authorities Act 1902, Goolman Division became the Shire of Goolman on 31 March 1903. The Shire offices were in High Street, Boonah. The Goolman Shire War Memorial was unveiled in Boonah (then part of the Goolman Shire) on 19 May 1920 by General Birdwood and Councillor Alexander John Tait McKay. It is generally known as the Boonah War Memorial. On 14 October 1937 was renamed Shire of Boonah, which apparently means "bloodwood tree" in the local Aboriginal language.

=== Greater Ipswich Scheme of 1949 ===
On 29 January 1949, a new Local Government Act was enacted to further amalgamate local government in the Ipswich area, abolishing the Shires of Normanby and Rosewood. The City of Ipswich was enlarged (from 12¼ square miles to 30 square miles) to include the more urban parts of the Shire of Moreton (formerly known as the Shire of Ipswich). The Shire of Moreton was then enlarged by the inclusion of the northern part of the Shire of Normanby and all the Shire of Rosewood. The southern part of the Shire of Normanby was transferred to an enlarged Shire of Boonah (a gain of 384 people and 109 km^{2} (42 sq mi)).

The council for the enlarged Shire of Boonah was subdivided into three divisions, each electing three councillors.

=== Amalgamations in 2000 ===
In March 2000, Boonah added to its area part of the City of Ipswich, including Mount Walker, Warrill View and Rosevale, and the divisions were abolished, with a seven-member council representing the entire district.

=== Amalgamations of 2008 ===
On 15 March 2008, under the Local Government (Reform Implementation) Act 2007 passed by the Parliament of Queensland on 10 August 2007, Boonah merged with the southern rural section of the Shire of Beaudesert and the Harrisville–Peak Crossing section of the City of Ipswich to form the Scenic Rim Region.

== Towns and localities ==
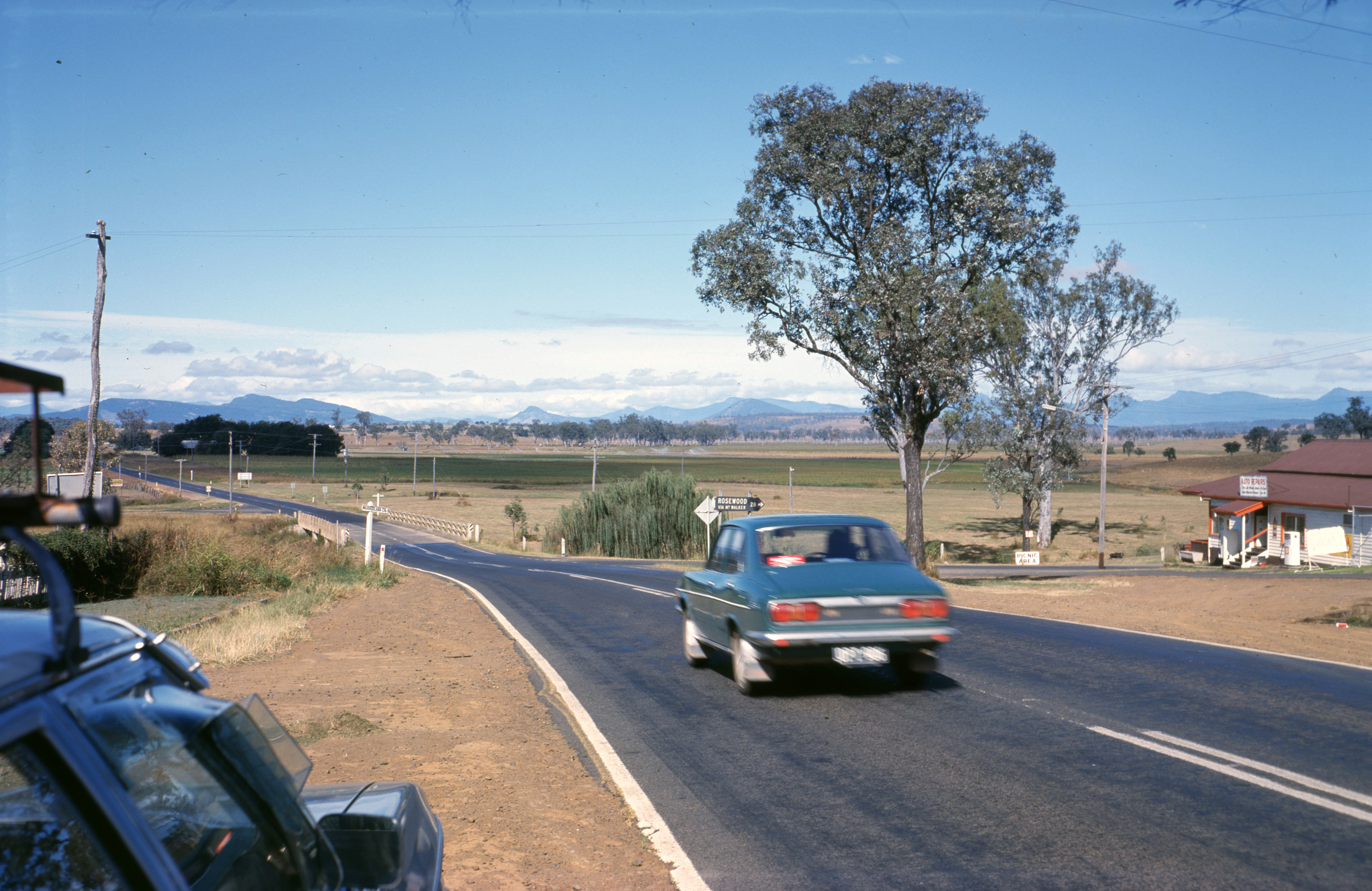
Cunningham Highway, Shire of Boonah, 1976

The Shire of Boonah included the following settlements:

- Boonah
- Aratula
- Charlwood
- Coulson
- Fassifern
- Harrisville^{1}
- Kalbar
- Maroon
- Moogerah
- Mount Alford
- Mount Walker
- Roadvale
- Rosevale
- Silverdale
- Tarome
- Templin
- Warrill View

^{1} - split with the City of Ipswich

== Population ==
Year	Population
1879	1,542
1933	6,430
1947	5,855 #
1954	5,929
1961	5,852
1966	5,471
1971	5,466
1976	5,378
1986	5,991
1991	6,541
1996	6,879
2001	8,207
2006	8,770

# The estimated 1947 population of the post-1949 area was 6,239.

== Chairmen and mayors ==
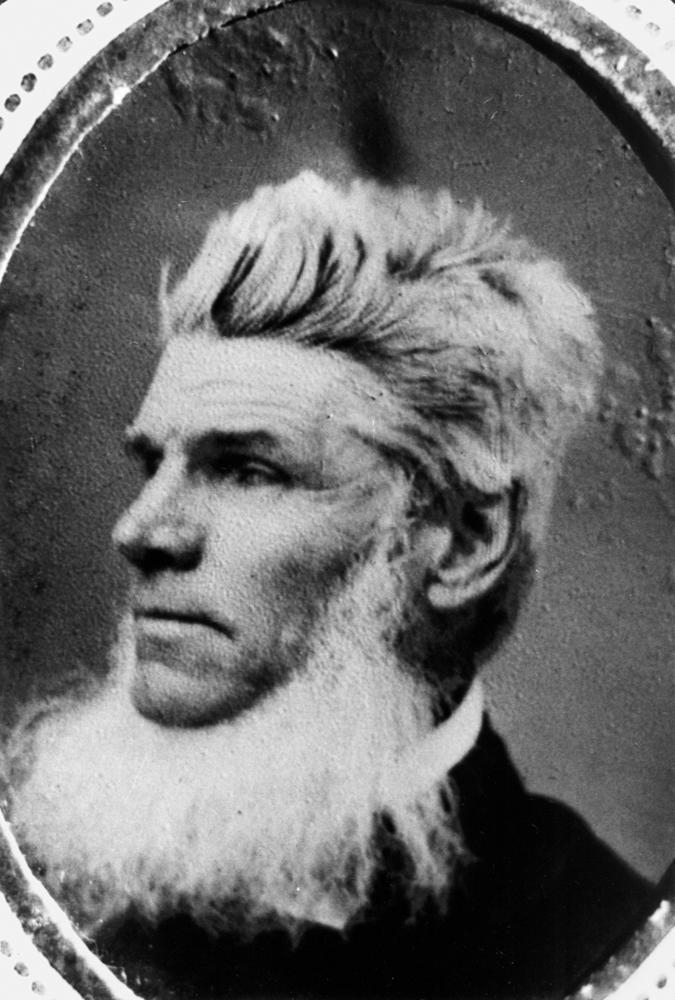
Charles William Hunt, 1880, first chairman of the Goolman divisional board

- 1880: Charles William Hunt
- 1915: William Ramsden Bowman (the great-grandson of John Macarthur)
- 1927: W. Farley
- 1943–1947 Harold Richter
- 1959–1961: Oliver Walter Hooper. He was the grandson of one of the original landowners of the area that became the town of Boonah. Many of the streets of Boonah are named after his aunts & uncles. Oliver was a member of the Boonah Shire Council for 15 years, becoming chairman (mayor) and dying during his second term.
- 1994–2008: John Brent. he is one of the longest continuing serving elected members in Australia with almost 40 years of service and over twenty as mayor. He was first elected as a councillor in the Shire of Boonah in 1976 and was chairman of the Shire of Boonah since 12 April 1994, becoming mayor of the Scenic Rim Region in 2008 following the amalgamation.

== See also ==
- List of divisional boards in Queensland
