= Town of Thursday Island =

Local government area of Queensland, Australia

Coordinates: 10.5838°S 142.2195°E

The Town of Thursday Island was a local government area in Queensland, Australia, based on Thursday Island.

== History ==
The town was proclaimed in October 1885.

== Mayors ==
- 1927: J. Ferguson
