= Electoral district of Normanby =

There are two former electoral districts called Normanby:

- Electoral district of Normanby (Queensland)
- Electoral district of Normanby (Victoria)
