= Shire of Laidley =

Coordinates: 27.6353°S 152.3901°E

- Local government area
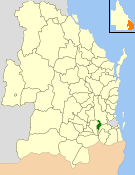
- Location within Queensland

- Country: Australia
- State: Queensland
- Region: Lockyer Valley
- Established: 1888
- Council seat: Laidley

Area
  - Total: 700.6 km^{2} (270.5 sq mi)

Population
  - Total: 14,311 (2006 census)
  - Density: 20.4268/km^{2} (52.905/sq mi)
- Website: Shire of Laidley
LGAs around Shire of Laidley
Esk	Esk	Esk
Gatton	Shire of Laidley	Ipswich
Warwick	Boonah	Boonah

The Shire of Laidley was a local government area located in the Lockyer Valley region between the cities of Toowoomba and Ipswich, and about 70 kilometres (43 mi) west of Brisbane, the state capital of Queensland, Australia. The shire covered an area of 700.6 square kilometres (270.5 sq mi), and existed from 1888 until its merger with the Shire of Gatton to form the Lockyer Valley Region on 15 March 2008.

== History ==
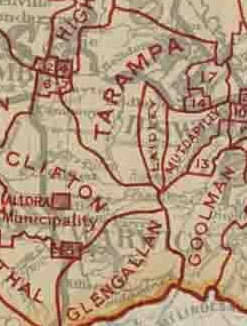
Map of Laidley Division and adjacent local government areas, March 1902

Prior to European settlement, the area around Laidley was home to the Kitabul Aboriginal people. Today, the Ugarapul People are considered the traditional owners of the Lockyer Valley region.

The district initially became part of the Tarampa Divisional Board, which was created on 15 January 1880 under the Divisional Boards Act 1879 in the colony of Queensland. On 25 April 1888, the Laidley district broke away and separately incorporated as the Laidley Division, and on 25 January 1890, the Forest Hill area moved from Tarampa to Laidley. On 1 July 1902, the town of Laidley was created as a separate municipality with its own Borough Council. With the passage of the Local Authorities Act 1902, the borough became a Town and the division a Shire on 31 March 1903. In 1917, Laidley Shire Council II was created with the amalgamation of Laidley Town Council, Laidley Shire Council I, and part of the Shire of Rosewood. On 15 March 2008, under the Local Government (Reform Implementation) Act 2007 passed by the Parliament of Queensland on 10 August 2007, Laidley merged with the Shire of Gatton to form the Lockyer Valley Region.

== Structure ==
The Shire of Laidley initially had three divisions each electing three councillors, but from 1917 onwards had five divisions each electing two councillors. The chairman and clerk were chosen from amongst the councillors.

== Towns and localities ==
The Shire of Laidley included the following settlements:

- Laidley
- Blenheim
- Forest Hill
- Glenore Grove
- Regency Downs
- Hatton Vale
- Kentville
- Laidley Heights
- Lockrose
- Mulgowie
- Plainland

== Population ==
Year	Population
1933	5,100
1947	4,755
1954	4,617
1961	4,793
1966	4,847
1971	4,493
1976	4,635
1981	5,380
1986	6,812
1991	8,463
1996	12,116
2001	12,636
2006	14,311

== Chairmen and mayors ==
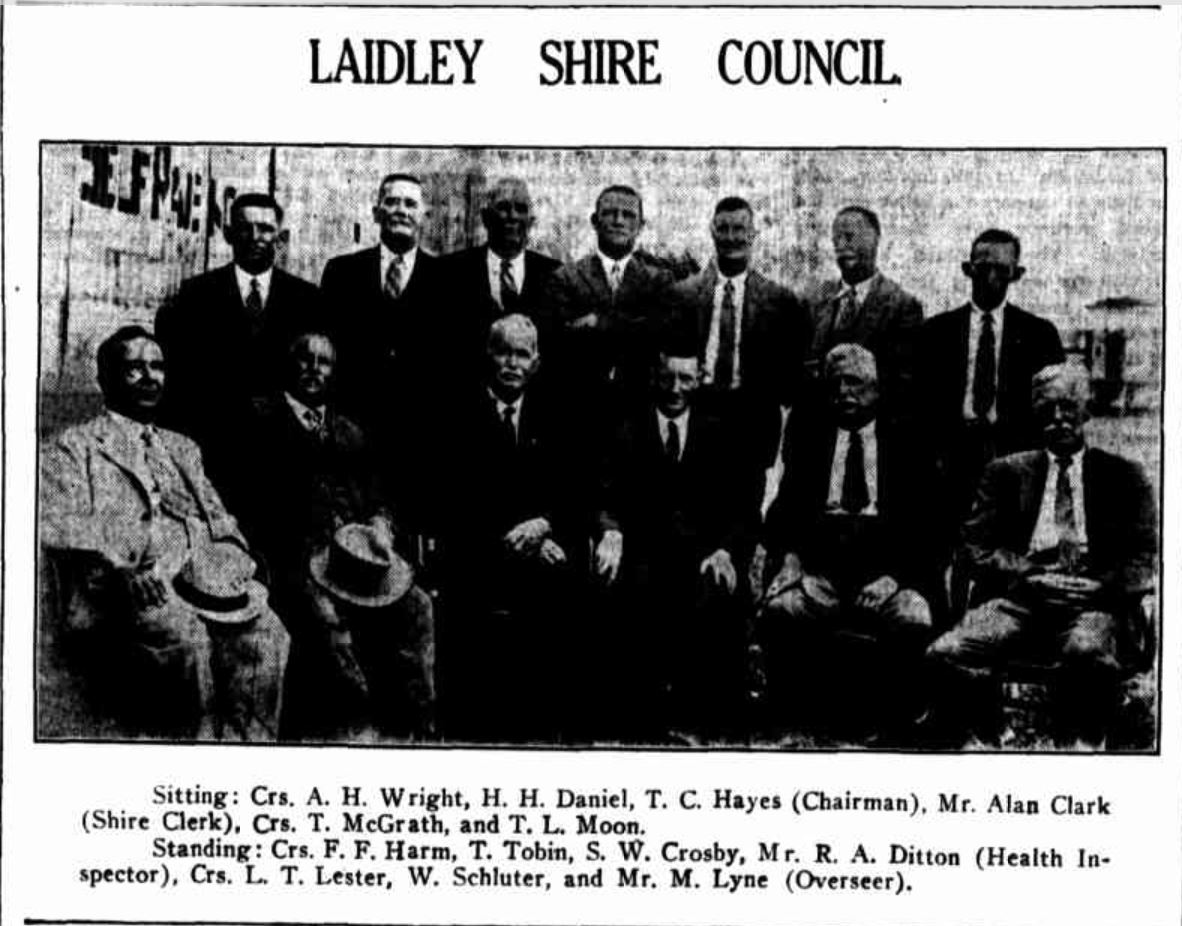
Laidley Shire Council, 1935

- 1905: Philip McGrath
- 1927: Andreas Schlecht
- 1930: Thomas Cornelius Hayes
- 1935: Thomas Cornelius Hayes
- 1970–1973: William Angus (Bill) Gunn
- 1997–2008: Shirley Pitt
