= Nogoa Division =

Local government area of Queensland, Australia

Coordinates: 23.624°S 148.764°E

The Nogoa Division was a local government area located in the Capricornia region of Central Queensland, Australia.

== History ==
On 11 November 1879, the Nogoa Division was established as one of 74 divisions around Queensland under the Divisional Boards Act 1879 with a population of 1251. However, the residents failed to elect a board and those appointed to the board by the Queensland Government failed to take any action. The division was described in 1881 as "inoperative" and the Queensland Government attempted to persuade neighbouring divisions to take over the management of Nogoa Division but without success.

About 10 years of inaction followed, before it was decided to abolish Nogoa and split the area across a number of neighbouring divisions. Gogango Division acquired approximately 1000 square miles of very sparsely populated land.
