= Shire of Kedron =

Local government area of Queensland, Australia

Coordinates: 27.3851°S 153.0290°E

The Shire of Kedron is a former local government area of Queensland, Australia, located in northern Brisbane. It existed between 1879 and 1925.

== History ==
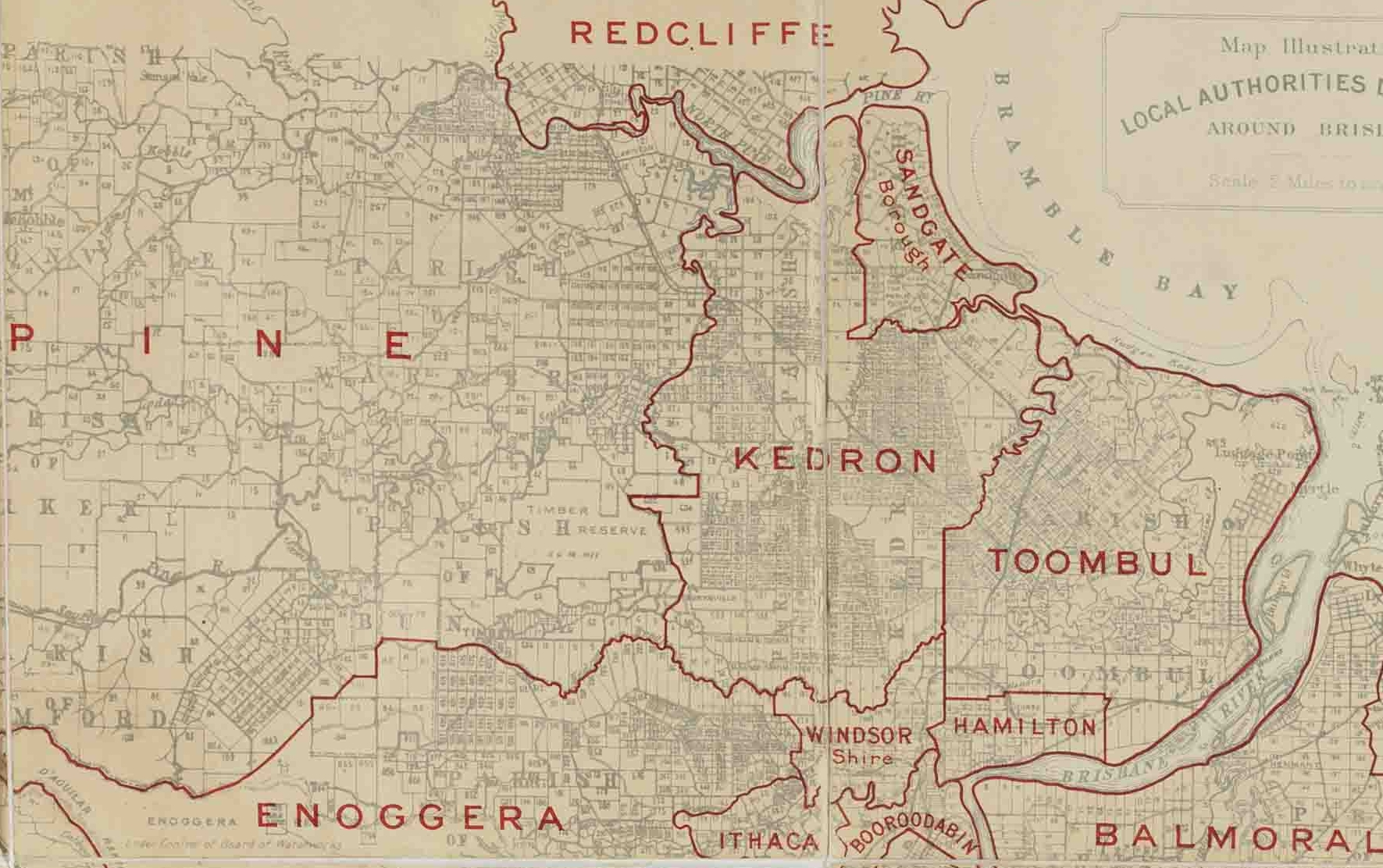
Map of Kedron Division and adjacent local government areas, March 1902

Nundah Division was one of the original divisions created on 11 November 1879 under the Divisional Boards Act of 1879. In November 1883, the Toombul Division was excised from the Nundah Division. In January 1901, Nundah Division was renamed Kedron Division.

On 31 March 1903, the Local Authorities Act 1902 replaced Divisions with Shires and Towns, replacing Kedron Division with Shire of Kedron.

On 1 October 1925, the shire was amalgamated into the City of Brisbane.

== Chairmen ==
- 1915: J. Gibson
- 1925: D.S.J. Darker
