= Shire of Walloon =

Local government area of Queensland, Australia

Coordinates: 27.561°S 152.589°E

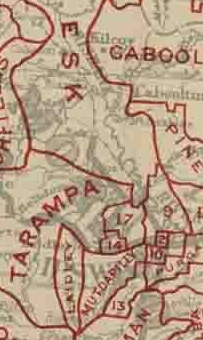
Map of Walloon Division and adjacent local government areas, March 1902. Legend: Ipswich Municipality (2), Brassall Division (9), Bundanba Division (10), Rosewood Division (14), Walloon Division (17)

The Shire of Walloon is a former local government area in the south-east of Queensland, Australia. Its administrative centre was in the town of Marburg.

== History ==
On 11 November 1879, the Walloon Division was created as one of 74 divisions within Queensland under the Divisional Boards Act 1879 with a population of 3749.

With the passage of the Local Authorities Act 1902, the Walloon Division became the Shire of Walloon on 31 March 1903.

On 19 January 1912, under the Local Authorities Act 1902, that part of the Shire of Walloon was excised to create the Shire of Lowood, centred on the town of Lowood.

=== The Greater Ipswich Scheme ===
On 13 October 1916, a rationalisation of the local government areas in and around Ipswich was implemented. It involved the abolition of five shires:

- Brassall
- Bundanba
- Lowood
- Purga
- Walloon

resulting in:

- a new Shire of Ipswich by amalgamating part of the Shire of Brassall, part of the Shire of Bundanba, part of the Shire of Walloon and all of the Shire of Purga
- an enlarged Shire of Rosewood by including part of the Shire of Walloon
- an enlarged City of Ipswich by including part of the Shire of Brassall and part of the Shire of Bundanba
- an enlarged Shire of Esk by including all of the Shire of Lowood

== Chairmen ==
- 1880: Peter Thomson
- 1914: J.F. Rea
