= Shire of Rosewood =

Local government area of Queensland, Australia

Coordinates: 27.648°S 152.596°E

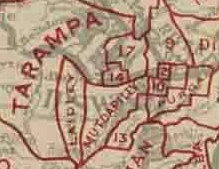
Map of Rosewood Division and adjacent local government areas, March 1902. Legend: Ipswich Municipality (2), Brassall Division (9), Bundanba Division (10), Normanby Division (13), Rosewood Division (14), Walloon Division (17)

The Shire of Rosewood is a former local government area in the south-east of Queensland, Australia.

== History ==
On 11 November 1879, the Walloon Division was created as one of 74 divisions within Queensland under the Divisional Boards Act 1879. On 11 October 1890, part of the Walloon Division was separated to create the Rosewood Division.

The first elections in Rosewood Division were held on 31 January 1891 and the first meeting was held on 11 February 1892.

On 31 March 1903, with the passage of the Local Authorities Act 1902, the Rosewood Division became the Shire of Rosewood, while the Walloon Division became the Shire of Walloon.

Following some years of protracted discussion and considerable argument, on 4 July 1905, the Shire of Mutdapilly was abolished and absorbed into an enlarged Shire of Rosewood. The rationale for this amalgamation was that the two shires were too small to be economical, with 30% of income going to office expenses; a combined shire was expected to have more funds for roads. The normal shire council elections that would normally have been held at the start of 1905 were delayed pending the finalisation of the amalgamation. The former Mutdapilly Shire would constitute 2 divisions within the new shire, each returning 2 members, while the former Rosewood would constitute 1 division within the new shire, returning 3 members.

=== The Greater Ipswich Scheme of 1916 ===
On 13 October 1916, a rationalisation of the local government areas in and around Ipswich was implemented. It involved the abolition of five shires:

- Brassall
- Bundanba
- Lowood
- Purga
- Walloon

resulting in:

- an enlarged Shire of Rosewood by including part of the Shire of Walloon
- a new Shire of Ipswich by amalgamating part of the Shire of Brassall, part of the Shire of Bundanba, part of the Shire of Walloon and all of the Shire of Purga
- an enlarged City of Ipswich by including part of the Shire of Brassall and part of the Shire of Bundanba
- an enlarged Shire of Esk by including all of the Shire of Lowood

=== 1937 dissolution of council ===
In October 1937, six councillors resigned in protest, claiming the shire chairman Christy Littman had authorised the shire clerk to work overtime, despite a previous resolution that the approval of the council was required. A vote of no confidence in the chairman was carried. However, as the chairman role was elected by the voters and not by the council, it had no effect. Local residents then petitioned the Queensland Government to dissolve the council. In November 1937, the government dissolved the council and ordered an election for a new council, which took place on 11 December 1937. All members of the dissolved council stood for re-election; in addition, there were other candidates. The election results were mixed. While a new chairman Loveday was elected in preference to former chairman Littman, a number of former council members who had resigned in protest at Littman's actions were not re-elected.

=== Greater Ipswich Scheme of 1949 ===
On 29 January 1949, a new Local Government Act was enacted to further amalgamate local government in the Ipswich area, abolishing the Shires of Normanby and Rosewood. The City of Ipswich was enlarged (from 12¼ square miles to 30 square miles) to include the more urban parts of the Shire of Moreton (formerly known as the Shire of Ipswich). The Shire of Moreton was then enlarged by the inclusion of the northern part of the Shire of Normanby and all the Shire of Rosewood. The southern part of the Shire of Normanby was transferred to an enlarged Shire of Boonah.

== Chairmen ==
- February 1891 – February 1892: Stephen Hardgrave
- February 1892 – March 1892: William Arndt (resigned)
- March 1892 – May 1892: Mark Bensley (resigned)
- May 1892 – February 1897: Stephen Hardgrave
- February 1897 – February 1898: John Lane
- February 1898 – January 1899: Stephen Hardgrave
- January 1899 – February 1900: Thomas Edward Coulson
- February 1900 – February 1901: Robert Samuel Hodge
- February 1901 – February 1902: Richard Robert Rudolf Kamp
- February 1902 – February 1903: Thomas Edward Coulson
- February 1903 – February 1904: Xavier Oberle
- February 1904 – : Thomas Edward Coulson
- 1905: Thomas Edward Coulson
- September 1905 – : E. Collins
- 1910: John Yates
- 1911–1912: Mr Creedy
- January 1912 – January 1913: John Kurt Just
- February 1913 – February 1914: Francis Arthur Kingston
- February 1914 – : Mr Ahearn
- February 1919 – February 1920: Herbert Dutney
- February 1920 – July 1921 : James Arthur Wells
- July 1921 – August 1923: William Ruhno
- Aug 1923 – April 1927: Herbert Dutney
- April 1927 – May 1930: Frank Julius William Etchstadt
- May 1930 – September 1930: Harry Heiner (died in office on 22 September 1930)
- November 1930 – April 1936: Frank Gunthorpe
- April 1936 – December 1937: Christy Littman (council dissolved)
- December 1937 – June 1945 (resigned): Arthur James Loveday
- June 1945 – 1949: Cornelius Joseph Murphy
