= Kedron Division =

Local government area of Queensland, Australia

Coordinates: 27.3851°S 153.0290°E

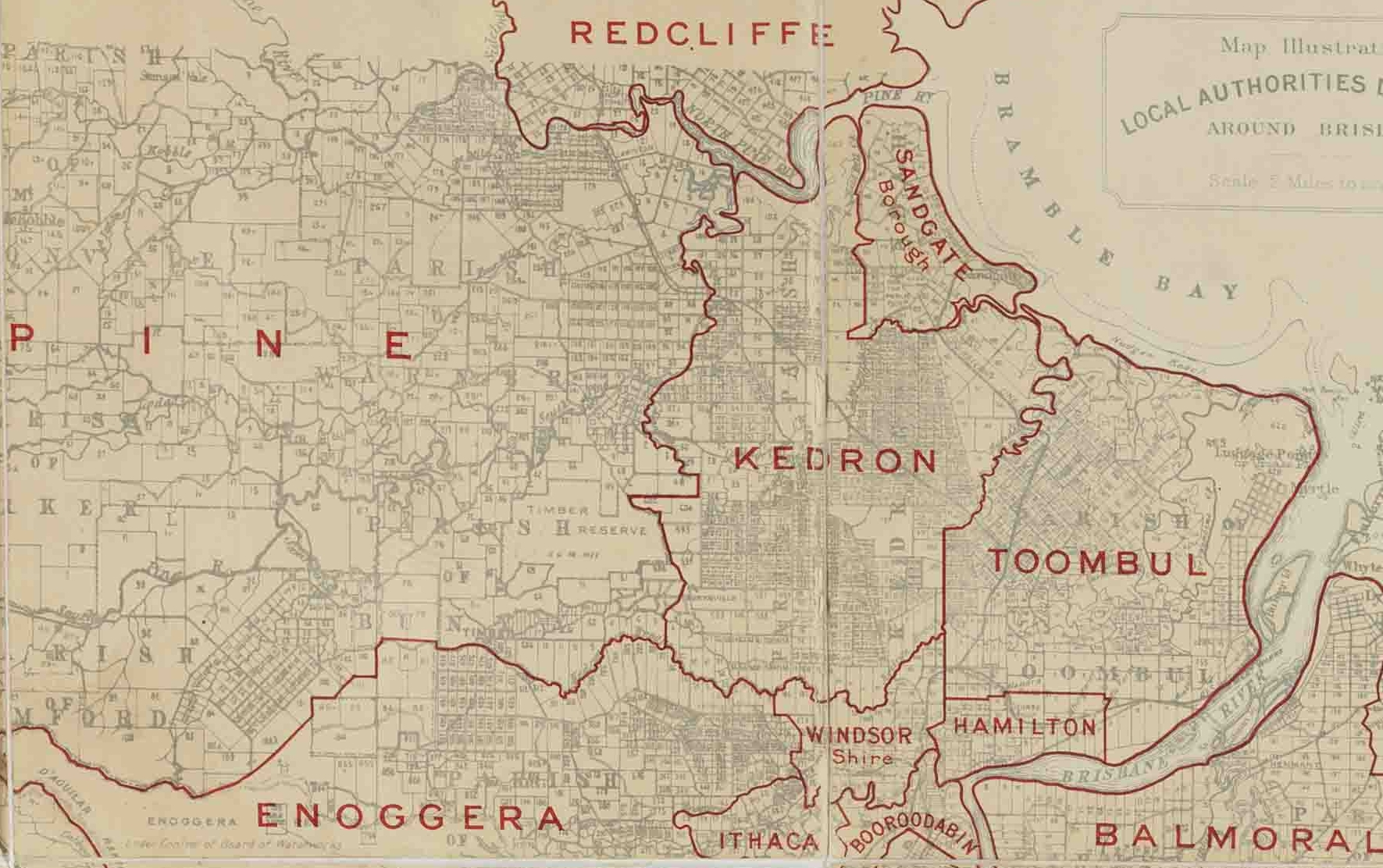
Map of Kedron Division and adjacent local government areas, March 1902

The Kedron Division is a former local government area of Queensland, Australia, located in northern Brisbane.

== History ==
Nundah Division was one of the original divisions created on 11 November 1879 under the Divisional Boards Act of 1879 with a population of 4270.

The division was a large one, ranging from the Pine River in the north to the Brisbane River in the south and from Moreton Bay in the east to Chinaman's Creek (now South Pine River) in the west. The residents in the southern part of the division (the Toombul area) felt their needs were quite distinct from those further north and immediately began to agitate for the division to be split. On 1 November 1883, the Toombul Division was separated from the Nundah Division.

In January 1901, Nundah Division was renamed Kedron Division.

On 31 March 1903, the Local Authorities Act 1902 replaced Divisions with Shires and Towns, replacing Kedron Division with Shire of Kedron.
