= Shire of Bundanba =

Local government area of Queensland, Australia

Coordinates: 27.6084°S 152.8107°E

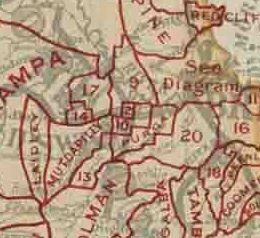
Map of Bundanba Division and adjacent local government areas, March 1902. Legend: Ipswich Municipality (2), Brassall Division (9), Bundanba Division (10), Normanby Division (13), Rosewood Division (14), Walloon (17)

The Shire of Bundanba is a former local government area in the south-east of Queensland, Australia. It existed from 1879 to 1916.

The spelling of Bundanba was officially changed to Bundamba in 1932, but the Bundamba spelling was in common use long prior to that.

== History ==
On 11 November 1879, the Bundanba Division was created as one of 74 divisions within Queensland under the Divisional Boards Act 1879 with a population of 1828.

With the passage of the Local Authorities Act 1902, the Bundanba Division became the Shire of Bundanba on 31 March 1903.

=== The Greater Ipswich Scheme ===
On 13 October 1916, a rationalisation of the local government areas in and around Ipswich was implemented. It involved the abolition of five shires:

- Brassall
- Bundanba
- Lowood
- Purga
- Walloon

resulting in:

- an enlarged City of Ipswich by including part of the Shire of Brassall and part of the Shire of Bundanba
- a new Shire of Ipswich by amalgamating part of the Shire of Brassall, part of the Shire of Bundanba, part of the Shire of Walloon and all of the Shire of Purga
- an enlarged Shire of Esk by including all of the Shire of Lowood
- an enlarged Shire of Rosewood by including part of the Shire of Walloon

== Chairmen ==
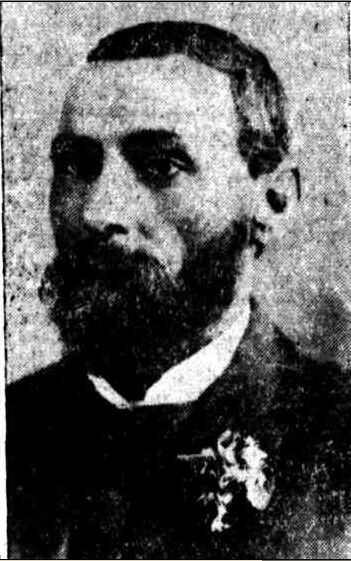
Harry Ferrett, chairman of Bundanba Shire Council, 1912

The following served as chairmen:

- 1894: William Jones
- 1896–97: William Staff
- 1899: Harry Ferrett
- 1900: Harry Ferrett
- 1903–06: Harry Ferrett
- 1912: Harry Ferrett
- 1916: Edward John L. Easton

=== Other notable councillors ===
- John Ferrett, Member of the Queensland Legislative Assembly
