= Shire of Brassall =

Local government area of Queensland, Australia

Coordinates: 27.5975°S 152.7458°E

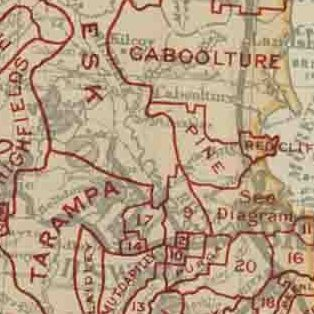
Map of Brassall Division and adjacent local government areas, March 1902. Legend: Ipswich Municipality (2), Brassall Division (9), Bundanba Division (10), Walloon Division (17), Enoggera & Indooroopilly Divisions ("See Diagram")

The Shire of Brassall is a former local government area in the south-east of Queensland, Australia. It existed from 1879 to 1917.

== History ==
On 11 November 1879, the Brassall Division was created as one of 74 divisions within Queensland under the Divisional Boards Act 1879 with a population of 2475.

With the passage of the Local Authorities Act 1902, the Brassall Division became the Shire of Brassall on 31 March 1903.

=== The Greater Ipswich Scheme ===
On 13 October 1916, a rationalisation of the local government areas in and around Ipswich was implemented. It involved the abolition of five shires:

- Brassall
- Bundanba
- Lowood
- Purga
- Walloon

resulting in:

- an enlarged Shire of Esk by including all of the Shire of Lowood
- an enlarged City of Ipswich by including part of the Shire of Brassall and part of the Shire of Bundanba
- an enlarged Shire of Rosewood by including part of the Shire of Walloon
- a new Shire of Ipswich by amalgamating part of the Shire of Brassall, part of the Shire of Bundanba, part of the Shire of Walloon and all of the Shire of Purga

Although abolished, the Brassall Shire Council continued to operate until the completion of their term with the final council meeting being held on 3 March 1917.

== Chairmen ==
- 1911: William Hastie
