= Shire of Highfields =

Local government area of Queensland, Australia

Coordinates: 27.429°S 151.968°E

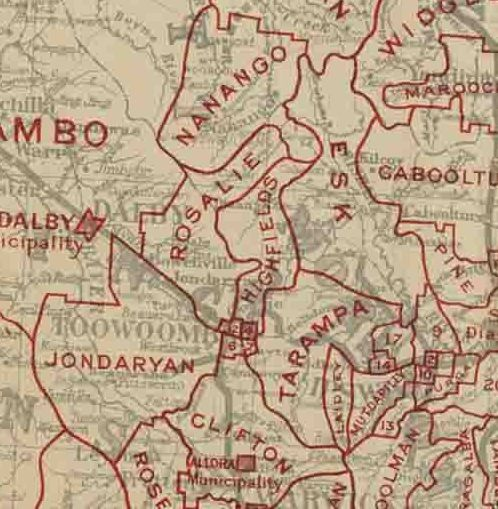
Map of Highfields Division and adjacent local government areas, March 1902. Legend: Toowoomba Municipality (4), Drayton Shire (6), Middle Ridge Division (7), Gowrie Division (12)

The Shire of Highfields is a former local government area on the Darling Downs in Queensland, Australia. It existed between 1879 and 1949.

== History ==
On 11 November 1879, the Highfields Division was created as one of 74 divisions within Queensland under the Divisional Boards Act 1879 with a population of 1998. It was divided into three sub-divisions with estimated populations of 480, 891 and 627 for Sub-divisions 1, 2 and 3 respectively, a total of 1989.

On 18 January 1884, there was an adjustment of boundaries between Highfields Division's subdivisions Nos. 1 and 2 and Esk Division.

In 1886, the Highfields Division was extended to incorporate the areas of Perseverance, Ravensbourne, Crows Nest, Djuan, Emu Creek, and Cooyar.

With the passage of the Local Authorities Act 1902, the Highfields Division became the Shire of Highfields on 31 March 1903.

In 1910–11, there was considerable pressure to persuade the shire council to relocate their office from Cabarlah to Crows Nest., but the shire council did not wish to put the issue to a referendum. This led to further agitation to create a new shire with Crows Nest at its centre.

On 25 January 1913, part of the Shire of Highfields was excised to create the Shire of Crows Nest.

On 19 March 1949, the Shire of Highfields was abolished and split between the Shire of Crows Nest and the Shire of Gatton.

== Chairman ==
The following men were the chairmen of the Highfields Divisional Board and the Highfields Shire Council.

- 1880–1888: F. T. Gregory
- 1888–1913: D. Munro
- 1914: J. Leane
- 1915–1917: D. Munro (again)
- 1917–1919: John Kynoch
- 1920–1921: B. J. Yaldwin
- 1921–1939: John Kynoch (again), died in office
- 1939–1947: H. Franke
- 1947–1948: W. F. Quinn
- 1948–1949: S. Purtill
