= Shire of Purga =

Local government area in the south-east of Queensland, Australia

Coordinates: 27.7018°S 152.715°E

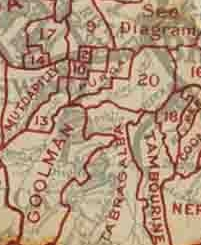
Map of Purga Division and adjacent local government areas, March 1902. Legend: Ipswich Municipality (2), Brassall Division (9), Bundamba Division (10), Normanby Division (13), Yeerongpilly Division (20), Indooroopilly Division & Sherwood Division (See Diagram)

The Shire of Purga is a former local government area in the south-east of Queensland, Australia.

== History ==
On 11 November 1879, the Purga Division was created as one of 74 divisions within Queensland under the Divisional Boards Act 1879 with a population of 2089.

With the passage of the Local Authorities Act 1902, the Purga Division became the Shire of Purga on 31 March 1903.

=== The Greater Ipswich Scheme ===
On 13 October 1916, a rationalisation of the local government areas in and around Ipswich was implemented. It involved the abolition of five shires:

- Brassall
- Bundamba
- Lowood
- Purga
- Walloon

resulting in:

- a new Shire of Ipswich by amalgamating part of the Shire of Brassall, part of the Shire of Bundanba, part of the Shire of Walloon and all of the Shire of Purga
- an enlarged Shire of Rosewood by including part of the Shire of Walloon
- an enlarged City of Ipswich by including part of the Shire of Brassall and part of the Shire of Bundamba
- an enlarged Shire of Esk by including all of the Shire of Lowood

== Chairmen ==
- 1891: William Howarth Ackerley
