= Shire of Balmoral =

Local government area of Queensland, Australia

Coordinates: 27.458°S 153.131°E

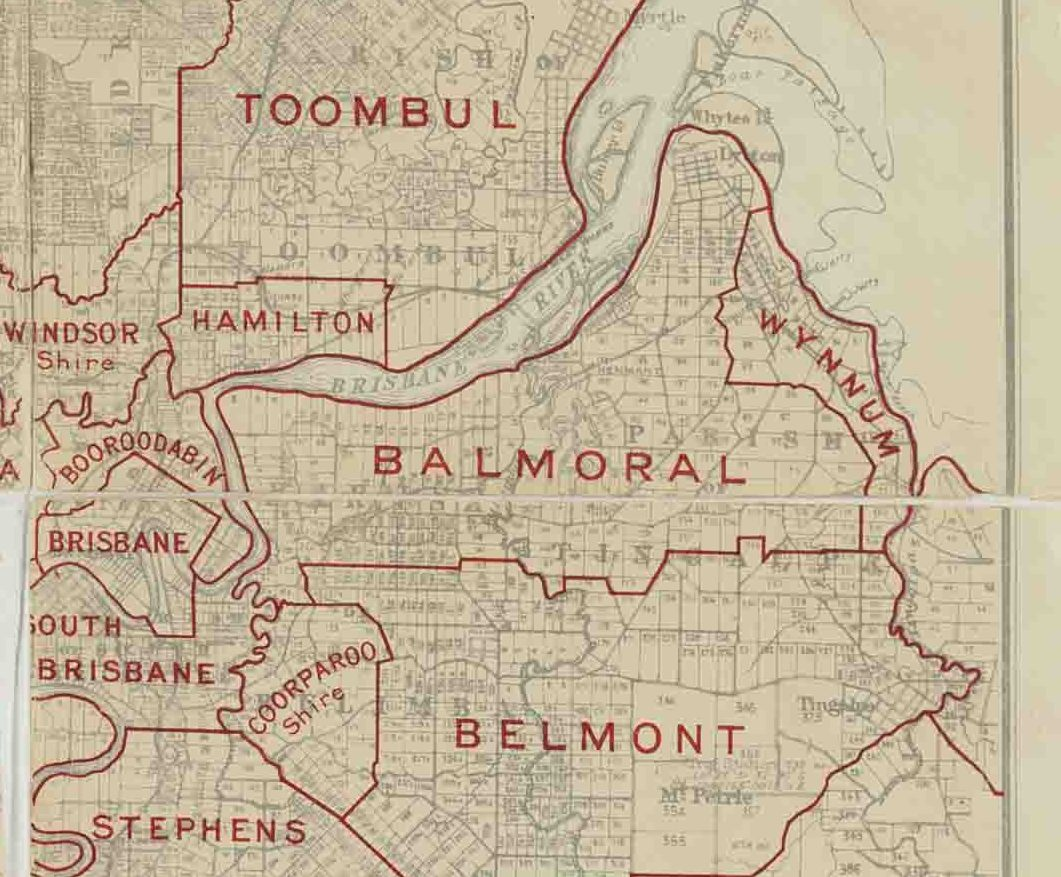
Map of Balmoral Division and adjacent local government areas, March 1902

The Shire of Balmoral is a former local government area of Queensland, Australia, located in eastern Brisbane.

== History ==
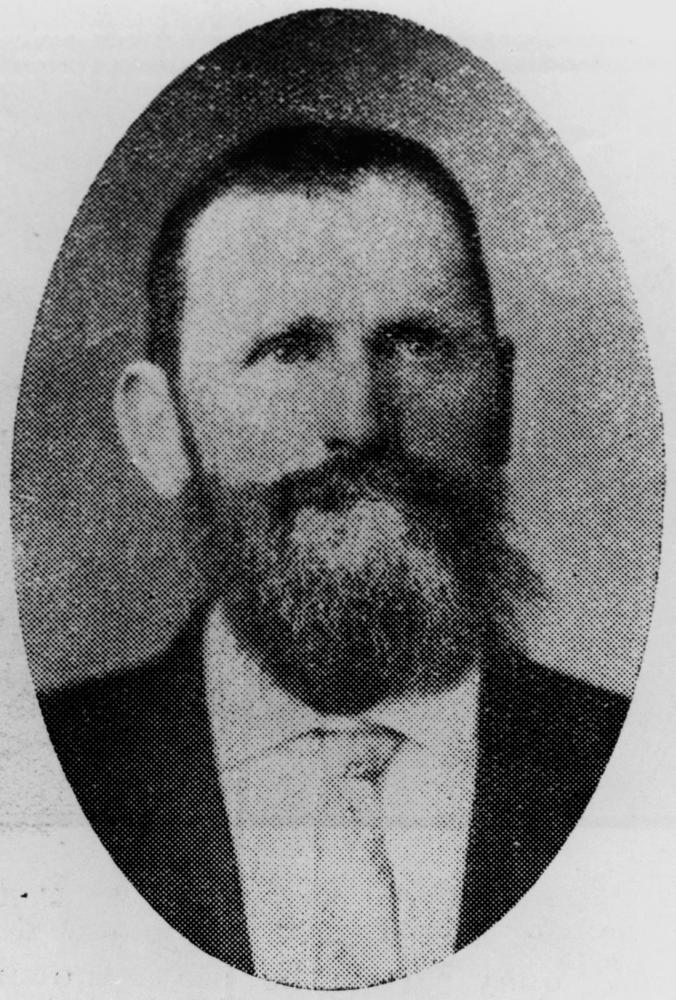
Councillor E. Stanton, chairman of the Balmoral Shire Council, 1909

The Bulimba Division was one of the original divisions created on 11 November 1879 under the Divisional Boards Act 1879. On 19 January 1888, the No. 1 subdivision of Bulimba Division was separated to create Balmoral Division.

On 17 March 1892, there was an alteration of boundaries. The Pritchard's Road land and gravel reserve (100 acres) were transferred from Kianawah Division (later renamed Wynnum Division) to Balmoral Division, while the Grassdale Estate land was transferred from Kianawah Division to Bulimba Division.

The Local Authorities Act 1902 replaced all Divisions with Towns and Shires, so the Balmoral Division became the Shire of Balmoral on 31 March 1903.

On 1 October 1925, the shire was amalgamated into the City of Brisbane.

== Chairmen ==
The chairmen of the Balmoral Shire Council were:

- 1888–1890: Edward Griffith (brother of Samuel Griffith)
- 1891: James Nuttall
- 1892: Alexander Kelly
- 1893: C. F. Uhlmann
- 1894: T. Penlington
- 1895: E. Stanton
- 1896–1897: R. Jamieson
- 1898–1899: A. C. H. Rossiter
- 1900: E. Stanton
- 1901–1902: E. K. Russell
- 1903–1904: W. Icke
- 1905: A. Stirling
- 1906: R. J. Mulvey
- 1907: J. Congreve
- 1908: P. G. Donovan
- 1909: E. Stanton
- 1911: John Watson
- 1912–1913: E. Stanton
- 1914:
- 1915:
- 1916–1917: A. Harrison
- 1918:
- 1919:
- 1920–1925: A. Harrison
