= Town of Wynnum =

Local government area of Queensland, Australia

Coordinates: 27.4445°S 153.1614°E

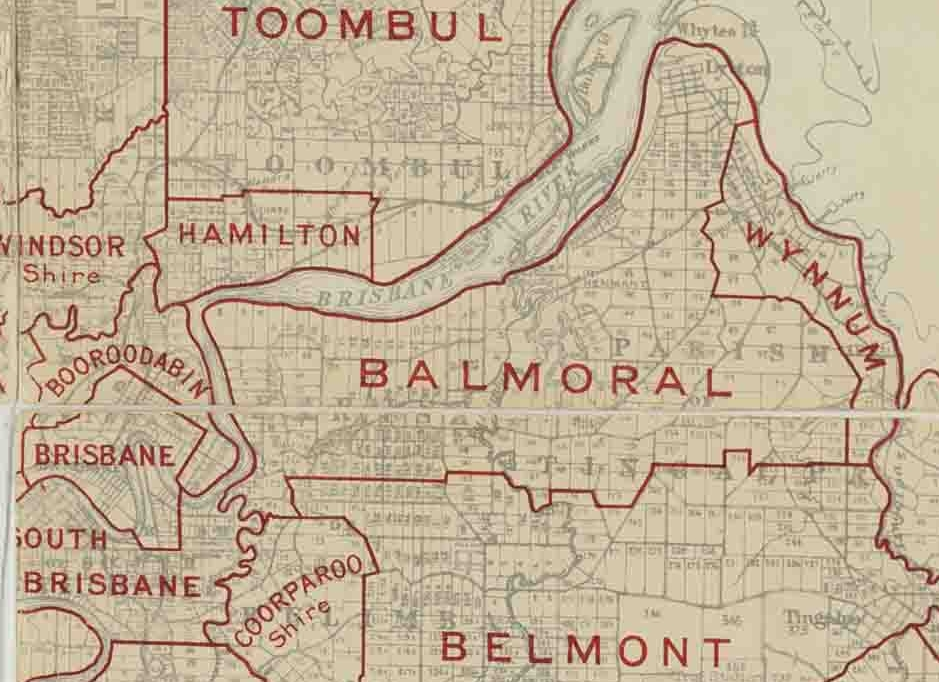
Map of Wynnum Division and most adjacent local government areas, March 1902. Although not shown, Cleveland Division is to the south-east of Wynnum Division

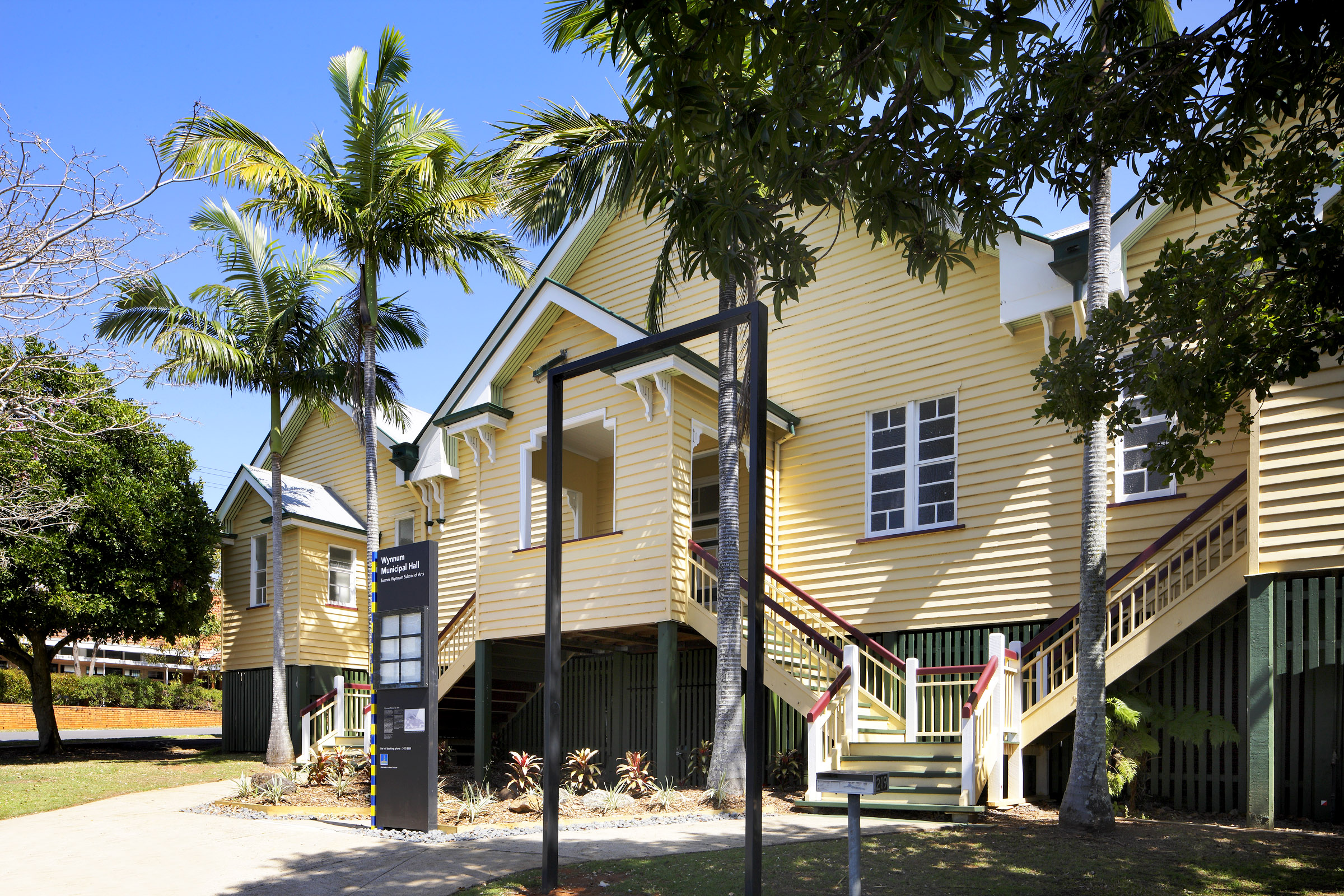
Wynnum Hall viewed from Bay Terrace, Wynnum, 2011

The Town of Wynnum is a former local government area of Queensland, Australia, located in eastern Brisbane adjacent to Moreton Bay around the present day suburb of Wynnum.

== History of Wynnum ==
The Bulimba Division was one of the original divisions created on 11 November 1879 under the Divisional Boards Act 1879. On 4 January 1888, the No. 2 subdivision of the Bulimba Division was separated to create the new Kianawah Division.

On 17 March 1892, there was an alteration of boundaries. The Pritchard's Road land and gravel reserve (100 acres) were transferred from Kianawah Division to Balmoral Division. The Grassdale Estate land was transferred from Kianawah Division to Bulimba Division.

Kianawah Division was renamed Wynnum Division on 3 November 1892.

In 1902, the Local Authorities Act 1902 replaced all Divisions with Towns and Shires, creating the Shire of Wynnum on 31 March 1903.

On 31 November 1912, the Shire of Wynnum was proclaimed the Town of Wynnum.

In 1925, the Town of Wynnum was amalgamated into the City of Brisbane.

== Mayors ==
The last Mayor of the Town of Wynnum was John William Greene. Greene won the election for Mayor for 1921, held on Saturday 23 July 1921, for a three-year term. He then successfully nominated for Mayor for 5 April 1924 elections, being elected Mayor with 1334 votes over his nearest rival's 1118 votes, with a third candidate getting 668 votes, for a term that would last less than a year before Wynnum was amalgamated into Brisbane. Green would later be elected Mayor of the greater Brisbane by a majority of Alderman for 1931 to 1934.
