= Shire of Ipswich =

Local government area of Queensland, Australia

The Shire of Ipswich is a former local government area in the south-east of Queensland, Australia.

== History ==
=== The Greater Ipswich Scheme ===
On 13 October 1916, a rationalisation of the local government areas in and around Ipswich was implemented. It involved the abolition of five shires:

- Brassall
- Bundanba
- Lowood
- Purga
- Walloon

resulting in:

- a new Shire of Ipswich by amalgamating part of the Shire of Brassall, part of the Shire of Bundanba, part of the Shire of Walloon and all of the Shire of Purga
- an enlarged Shire of Rosewood by including part of the Shire of Walloon
- an enlarged City of Ipswich by including part of the Shire of Brassall and part of the Shire of Bundanba
- an enlarged Shire of Esk by including all of the Shire of Lowood

=== Renamed ===
One 28 July 1917, the Shire of Ipswich was renamed the Shire of Moreton.
