= Shire of Normanby =

Local government area of Queensland, Australia

Coordinates: 27.810°S 152.666°E

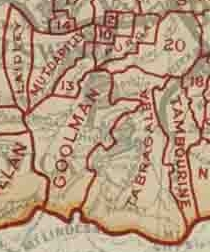
Map of Normanby Division and adjacent local government areas, March 1902. Legend: Ipswich Municipality (2), Bundanba Division (10), Normanby Division (13), Yeerongpilly Division (20)

The Shire of Normanby is a former local government area in the south-east of Queensland, Australia. Its administrative centre was in Harrisville.

== History ==
On 11 November 1879, the Mutdapilly Division was created as one of 74 divisions within Queensland under the Divisional Boards Act 1879. On 25 October 1890, part of the Mutdapilly Division was excised to create the Normanby Division.

With the passage of the Local Authorities Act 1902, the Normanby Division became the Shire of Normanby on 31 March 1903.

=== Greater Ipswich Scheme of 1949 ===
On 29 January 1949, a new Local Government Act was enacted to further amalgamate local government in the Ipswich area, abolishing the Shires of Normanby and Rosewood. The City of Ipswich was enlarged (from 12¼ square miles to 30 square miles) to include the more urban parts of the Shire of Moreton (formerly known as the Shire of Ipswich). The Shire of Moreton was then enlarged by the inclusion of the northern part of the Shire of Normanby and all the Shire of Rosewood. The southern part of the Shire of Normanby was transferred to an enlarged Shire of Boonah.

== Chairmen ==
- 1891: Thomas Robertson
- 1909: R.C. Marcuis Fischer
- 1919: R.C. Marcuis Fischer
- 1920: H. Perrett
- 1915: Edward Joseph Hayes*
- 1927: Walter Harsant
- George Brown served for 9 years as chairman
