= Shire of Mutdapilly =

Local government area of Queensland, Australia

Coordinates: 27.772°S 152.611°E

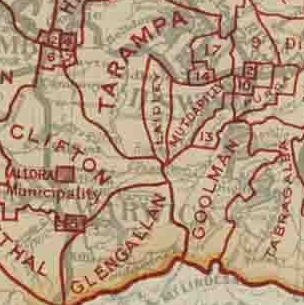
Map of Mutdapilly Division and adjacent local government areas, March 1902. Legend: Ipswich Municipality (2), Brassall Division (9), Bundanba Division (10), Normanby Division (13), Rosewood Division (14), Walloon Division (17)

The Shire of Mutdapilly is a former local government area in the south-east of Queensland, Australia. The name comes from the Mutdapilly locality, but the locality was never the administrative centre of the shire.

== History ==
On 11 November 1879, the Mutdapilly Division was created as one of 74 divisions within Queensland under the Divisional Boards Act 1879 with a population of 1809. Initially the divisional office was in the Ipswich Railway Station (outside of the division itself).

On 4 January 1884, there was an adjustment of boundaries between No. 2 subdivision of Mutdapilly Division and subdivision No. 2 of the Goolman Division.

Having an office in Ipswich (outside of the division) was not very convenient for many council members, ratepayers, and contractors, particularly those living in the southern parts of the division, such as Rosevale. The possibility of relocating the divisional offices to somewhere more central within the division was frequently raised. In March 1890, it was decided to relocate the office to Mount Walker. This would put everyone within 9 miles of the office, instead of some people having to travel up to 29 miles to Ipswich. However, the decision was controversial with many ratepayers arguing that they had to travel to Ipswich to transact other business, but not to Mount Walker, so Ipswich was actually more convenient for them. It was also argued that the difficulties of those in the Rosevale area were over-stated as there were a disproportionate number of members of the divisional board living in that area. In June 1890, the divisional board voted to rescind the decision to relocate their office to Mount Walker.

On 25 October 1890, part of the Mutdapilly Division was excised to create the Normanby Division.

The separation of the Normanby Division and the resultant change to the composition of the Mutdapilly Division Board lead to the decision in February 1891 to proceed with the Mount Walker office. Divisional board meetings were immediately relocated to Mount Walker albeit in temporary premises, and in April 1891 a piece of land was purchased in Mount Walker and tenders called for the construction of the office. The office was finished and in use by July 1891.

With the passage of the Local Authorities Act 1902, the Mutdapilly Division became the Shire of Mutdapilly on 31 March 1903.

In September 1904, the shire council voted to relocate their office from Mount Walker to Rosewood (not within the shire). The disadvantages of Mount Walker included lack of railway facilities, lack of banking facilities and poor postal facilities, all of which were available in Rosewood. Again, this was controversial, especially as discussions were underway to amalgamate Mutdapilly and Rosewood Shires. However, by February 1905, the office had been physically relocated to Rosewood (that is, the building itself was moved).

Following some years of protracted discussion and considerable argument, on 4 July 1905, the Shire of Mutdapilly was abolished and absorbed into an enlarged Shire of Rosewood. The rationale for this amalgamation was that the two shires were too small to be economical, with 30% of income going to office expenses; a combined shire was expected to have more funds for roads. The normal shire council elections that would normally have been held at the start of 1905 were delayed pending the finalisation of the amalgamation. The former Mutdapilly Shire would constitute 2 divisions within the new shire, each returning 2 members, while the former Rosewood would constitute 1 division within the new shire, returning 3 members. Following those elections, the first meeting of the newly enlarged Rosewood Shire Council decided to relocate into the former Mutdapilly Shire's offices, with a plan to turn the old Roseville Shire offices into a School of Arts.

== Chairmen ==
- April 1891 – : Charles Franklyn Mort

John Yates was the chairman of the Mutdapilly Divisional Board on several occasions.
