= Shire of Esk =

- Local government area
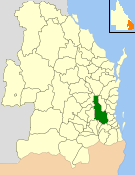
- Location within Queensland

- Country: Australia
- State: Queensland
- Region: South East Queensland
- Established: 1879
- Abolished: 2007
- Council seat: Esk

Area
  - Total: 3,936.3 km^{2} (1,519.8 sq mi)

Population
  - Total: 15,002 (2006 census)
  - Density: 3.81119/km^{2} (9.8709/sq mi)
- Website: Shire of Esk
LGAs around Shire of Esk
Nanango	Kilkivan	Kilcoy
Crows Nest	Shire of Esk	Caboolture
Gatton, Laidley	Ipswich	Pine Rivers, Brisbane

The Shire of Esk was a local government area in South East Queensland, Australia, located about 90 kilometres (56 mi) west – northwest of Brisbane. It stretched from the Lockyer Valley north and west to the Great Dividing Range and up the valley of the Brisbane River. Esk covered an area of 3,936.2 square kilometres (1,519.8 sq mi), and existed from 1879 until its merger with the Shire of Kilcoy to form the Somerset Region on 15 March 2008.

== History ==
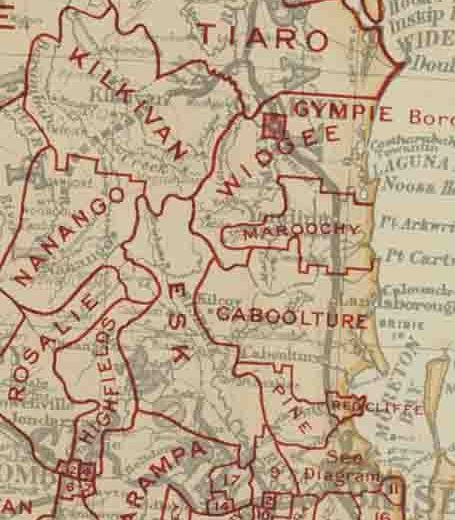
Map of Esk Division and adjacent local government areas, March 1902. Legend: Brassall Division (9), Walloon Division (17)

The Durundur Division was incorporated on 11 November 1879 under the Divisional Boards Act 1879 with a population of 1428. Its name was changed to Esk Division on 2 June 1880 by proclamation.

On 18 January 1884, there was an adjustment of boundaries between Highfields Division's subdivisions Nos. 1 and 2 and Esk Division.

With the passage of the Local Authorities Act 1902, Esk became a Shire on 31 March 1903. The council consisted of an elected mayor and ten councillors, and was not subdivided.

In 1980, the Council of the Shire of Esk adopted the head of the red deer as its logo, honouring a gift from Queen Victoria in September 1873 to the district. In 1984 the official logo was adopted. The Weeping Bottlebrush was adopted as the shire's floral emblem on 10 August 1994.

On 15 March 2008, under the Local Government (Reform Implementation) Act 2007 passed by the Parliament of Queensland on 10 August 2007, the Shire of Esk merged with the Shire of Kilcoy to form the Somerset Region.

== Towns and localities ==
The Shire of Esk included the following settlements:

- Esk
- Borallon
- Caboonbah
- Clarendon
- Colinton
- Coolana
- Coominya
- Dundas
- Fairney View
- Fernvale
- Glamorgan Vale
- Harlin
- Lake Somerset
- Lake Wivenhoe
- Lark Hill
- Linville
- Lowood
- Minden
- Moore
- Mount Hallen
- Mount Tarampa
- Prenzlau
- Rifle Range
- Tarampa
- Toogoolawah
- Vernor
- Wanora

== Population ==
Year	Population
1921	7,925
1933	7,654
1947	7,137
1954	6,985
1961	6,430
1966	6,120
1971	5,579
1976	5,970
1981	8,090
1986	9,109
1991	10,977
1996	13,391
2001	14,029
2006	15,002

== Chairmen and Mayors ==
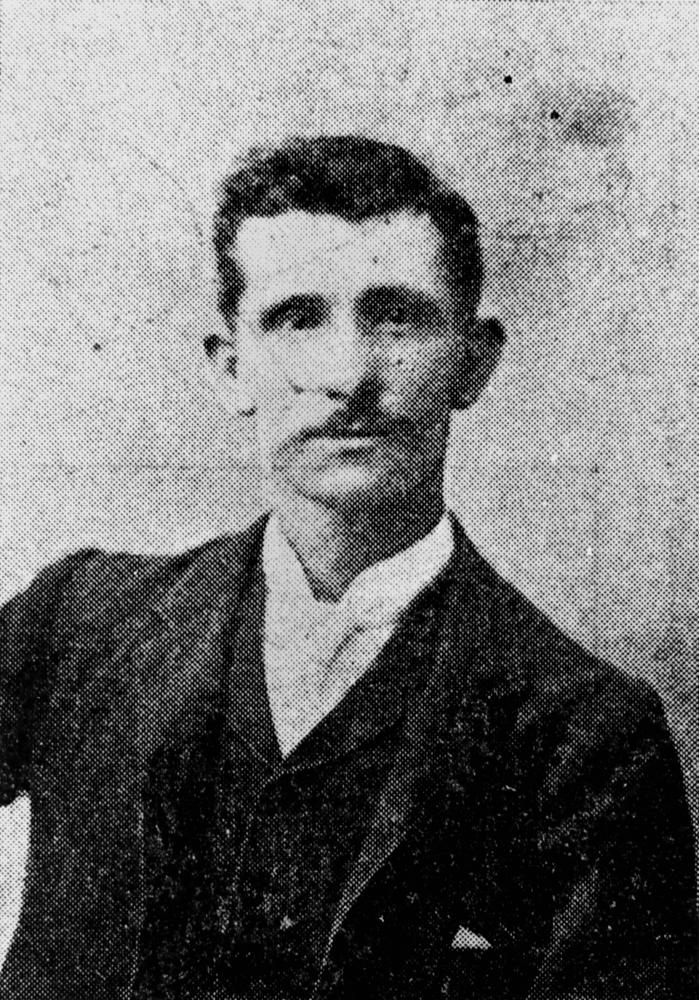
- Alexander Smith, chairman of Esk Shire for many years
  March 1880 - December 1885: Frederick Lord
- January 1886 - March 1888: James Henry McConnel
- March 1888 - February 1889: Frederick Lord
- February 1889 - February 1891: Thomas Pryde
- February 1891 - February 1893: Frederick Lord
- February 1893 - February 1894: George Charles Taylor
- February 1894 - February 1896: Patrick Clifford
- February 1896 - February 1899: James Henry McConnel
- March 1899 - February 1901: Walter Francis
- March 1901 - January 1902: Henry Plantagenet Somerset
- February 1902 - February 1905: Walter Francis
- March 1905 - February 1906: Alexander Smith
- February 1906 - February 1907: Charles Stuart Lord (son of Frederick Lord)
- February 1907 - February 1908: Frederick Seib
- February 1908 - February 1909: John MacDonald
- February 1909 - February 1910: Alexander Smith
- February 1910 - February 1911: Charles George Handley
- February 1911 - February 1912: Alexander Smith
- March 1913 - May 1914: James Henry McConnel
- May 1914 - July 1914: Alexander Smith
- July 1914 - March 1915: Herbert Prescott Gardner
- March 1915 - March 1916: Eric Walter McConnel
- March 1916 - February 1917: Alexander Smith
- February 1917 - January 1919: George Bishop
- January 1919 - February 1920: William Roy Butler
- February 1920 - August 1921: Michael Frederick Thompson
- August 1921 - April 1930: Alexander Smith
- April 1930 - August 1940: William Lewis
- 1940 - July 1952: James Barbour, junior
- September 1952 – 1961: William Wells
- 1961–1967: Norman Joseph McInnes
- 1967 – September 1983: Kenneth Edgar Haslindgden
- October 1983 – c. 1987: Lester Joseph Williams
- 1991–2004: Jean Bray
- 2004–2007: Graeme Lehmann; after amalgamation continued as Mayor of Somerset Region
