= Local government areas of Queensland =

Areas in the Australian state

Map of LGAs as of 2014

This is a list of local government areas (LGAs) in Queensland, Australia, sorted by region. For the history and responsibilities of local government in that state, see Local government in Queensland. For former local government areas in Queensland, see List of former local government areas of Queensland.

== LGAs sorted by region ==
Name	Council seat	Region	Year estab.	Area (km^{2})	Population		Notes	Map
Name	Council seat	Region	Year estab.	Area (km^{2})	(2021)	(2022)	Notes	Map
City of Brisbane	Brisbane	South East Queensland	1924	1,343	1,264,024	1,284,698	Capital city of Queensland Administers the central portion of the South East Queensland agglomeration The City of Brisbane was created from the 30 October 1924 amalgamation of: the cities of Brisbane and South Brisbane; the towns of Hamilton, Ithaca, Sandgate, Toowong, Windsor and Wynnum; and the shires of Balmoral, Belmont, Coorparoo, Enoggera, Kedron, Moggill, Sherwood, Stephens, Taringa, Tingalpa (part of), Toombul and Yeerongpilly (part of).	
City of Gold Coast	Surfers Paradise	South East Queensland	1948	1,334	633,764	647,824	The Local Government (Albert, Beaudesert and Gold Coast) Regulation 1994 was gazetted on 16 December 1994, resulting in the amalgamation of the Shire of Albert into City of Gold Coast at the 1995 local government elections.	
City of Ipswich	Ipswich	South East Queensland	1860	1,094	233,302	242,884		
Lockyer Valley Region	Gatton	South East Queensland	2008	2,269	41,762	42,663	The Lockyer Valley Region was created from the 15 March 2008 amalgamation of: the Shire of Gatton; the Shire of Laidley	
Logan City	Logan Central	South East Queensland	1978	958	350,740	363,301	On 15 March 2008, Logan City expanded the northern part of the Shire of Beaudesert into its territory	
City of Moreton Bay	Caboolture	South East Queensland	2008	2,042	484,428	497,154	The Moreton Bay Regional Council was created from the amalgamation on 15 March 2008 of Councils for: City of Redcliffe; Shire of Pine Rivers; Shire of Caboolture; On 21 July 2023 the Council officially changed its name to City of Moreton Bay.	
Shire of Noosa	Tewantin	South East Queensland	2014	870	56,873	57,397	Re-established in 2014 after being de-amalgamated from Sunshine Coast Region	
Redland City	Cleveland	South East Queensland	1949	537	161,730	163,866		
Scenic Rim Region	Beaudesert	South East Queensland	2008	4,243	43,595	44,374	The Scenic Rim Region was created from the 15 March 2008 amalgamation of: the Shire of Boonah; the southern part of the Shire of Beaudesert; the Harrisville and Peak Crossing areas from the City of Ipswich	
Somerset Region	Esk	South East Queensland	2008	5,373	25,391	25,733	The Somerset Region was created from the 15 March 2008 amalgamation of: the Shire of Esk; the Shire of Kilcoy	
Sunshine Coast Region	Maroochydore	South East Queensland	2008	2,254	346,648	356,059	The Sunshine Coast Region was created from the 15 March 2008 amalgamation of: the City of Caloundra; the Shire of Maroochy; the Shire of Noosa; Later, the Shire of Noosa was de-amalgamated from Sunshine Coast Region on 1 January 2014.	
Shire of Banana	Biloela	Wide Bay-Burnett	1879	28,550	14,663	14,794	On 15 March 2008, the Shire of Banana expanded Division 1 of the Shire of Taroom into its territory	
Bundaberg Region	Bundaberg	Wide Bay-Burnett	2008	6,431	100,118	102,189	The Bundaberg Region was created from the 15 March 2008 amalgamation of: the City of Bundaberg; the Shire of Burnett; the Shire of Isis; the Shire of Kolan	
Aboriginal Shire of Cherbourg	Cherbourg	Wide Bay-Burnett	1986	32	1,212	1,227		
Fraser Coast Region	Hervey Bay	Wide Bay-Burnett	2008	7,105	112,078	115,173	The Fraser Coast Region was created from the 15 March 2008 amalgamation of: the City of Hervey Bay; the City of Maryborough; the Shire of Woocoo; Divisions 1 & 2 of the Shire of Tiaro	
Gympie Region	Gympie	Wide Bay-Burnett	2008	6,884	53,851	55,170	The Gympie Region was created from the 15 March 2008 amalgamation of: the Shire of Cooloola; the Shire of Kilkivan; Division 3 (Theebine/Gunalda areas) of the Shire of Tiaro	
North Burnett Region	Gayndah	Wide Bay-Burnett	2008	19,670	10,144	10,220	The North Burnett Region was created from the 15 March 2008 amalgamation of: the Shire of Biggenden; the Shire of Eidsvold; the Shire of Gayndah; the Shire of Monto; the Shire of Mundubbera; the Shire of Perry	
South Burnett Region	Kingaroy	Wide Bay-Burnett	2008	8,382	33,325	33,831	The South Burnett Region was created from the 15 March 2008 amalgamation of: the Shire of Kingaroy; the Shire of Nanango; the Shire of Murgon; the Shire of Wondai	
Goondiwindi Region	Goondiwindi	Darling Downs	2008	19,258	10,404	10,449	The Goondiwindi Region was created from the 15 March 2008 amalgamation of: the Town of Goondiwindi; the Shire of Waggamba; the Shire of Inglewood	
Southern Downs Region	Warwick	Darling Downs	2008	7,108	36,641	37,040	The Southern Downs Region was created from the 15 March 2008 amalgamation of: the Shire of Warwick; the Shire of Stanthorpe	
Toowoomba Region	Toowoomba	Darling Downs	2008	12,957	175,316	178,590	The Toowoomba Region was created from the 15 March 2008 amalgamation of: the City of Toowoomba; the Shire of Cambooya; the Shire of Clifton; the Shire of Crows Nest; the Shire of Jondaryan; the Shire of Millmerran; the Shire of Pittsworth; the Shire of Rosalie	
Western Downs Region	Dalby	Darling Downs	2008	37,937	34,360	34,584	The Dalby Region was created from the 15 March 2008 amalgamation of: the Town of Dalby; the Shire of Chinchilla; the Shire of Murilla; the Shire of Tara; the Shire of Wambo; Division 2 of the Shire of Taroom; Later it was renamed Western Downs Region in August 2009.	
Central Highlands Region	Emerald	Central Queensland	2008	59,835	28,311	28,583	The Central Highlands Region was created from the 15 March 2008 amalgamation of: the Shire of Bauhinia; the Shire of Duaringa; the Shire of Emerald; the Shire of Peak Downs	
Gladstone Region	Gladstone	Central Queensland	2008	10,484	64,304	65,431	The Gladstone Region was created from the 15 March 2008 amalgamation of: the City of Gladstone; the Shire of Calliope; the Shire of Miriam Vale	
Isaac Region	Moranbah	Central Queensland	2008	58,708	22,426	22,770	The Isaac Region was created from the 15 March 2008 amalgamation of: the Shire of Belyando; the Shire of Broadsound; the Shire of Nebo	
Shire of Livingstone	Yeppoon	Central Queensland	2014	11,758	39,881	40,952	Re-established in 2014 after being de-amalgamated from Rockhampton Region	
Rockhampton Region	Rockhampton	Central Queensland	2008	6,570	82,904	83,723	The Rockhampton Region was created from the 15 March 2008 amalgamation of: the City of Rockhampton; the Shire of Fitzroy; the Shire of Livingstone; the Shire of Mount Morgan; Later, the Shire of Livingstone was being de-amalgamated from Rockhampton Region on 1 January 2014.	
Aboriginal Shire of Woorabinda	Woorabinda	Central Queensland	1986	391	1,041	1,060		
Shire of Burdekin	Ayr	North Queensland	1888	5,044	16,842	16,890		
Charters Towers Region	Charters Towers	North Queensland	2008	68,382	11,923	12,004	The Charters Towers Region was created from the 15 March 2008 amalgamation of: the City of Charters Towers; the Shire of Dalrymple	
Shire of Hinchinbrook	Ingham	North Queensland	1879	2,807	10,992	11,090		
Mackay Region	Mackay	North Queensland	2008	7,613	123,183	125,162	The Mackay Region was created from the 15 March 2008 amalgamation of: the City of Mackay; the Shire of Mirani; the Shire of Sarina	
Aboriginal Shire of Palm Island	Palm Island	North Queensland	1986	72	2,180	2,197		
City of Townsville	Townsville	North Queensland	2008	3,731	195,515	198,577	The new City of Townsville was created from the 15 March 2008 amalgamation of: the former City of Townsville; the City of Thuringowa	
Whitsunday Region	Bowen	North Queensland	2008	23,819	37,660	38,580	The Whitsunday Region was created from the 15 March 2008 amalgamation of: the Shire of Whitsunday; the Shire of Bowen	
Shire of Aurukun	Aurukun	Far North Queensland	1978	7,424	1,131	1,131		
Cairns Region	Cairns	Far North Queensland	2008	1,689	169,312	172,272	The Cairns Region was created from the 15 March 2008 amalgamation of: the City of Cairns; the Shire of Douglas; Later, the Shire of Douglas was being de-amalgamated from Cairns Region on 1 January 2014.	
Cassowary Coast Region	Innisfail	Far North Queensland	2008	4,688	29,525	29,651	The Cassowary Coast Region was created from the 15 March 2008 amalgamation of: the Shire of Cardwell; the Shire of Johnstone	
Shire of Cook	Cooktown	Far North Queensland	1919	105,719	4,631	4,679		
Shire of Douglas	Mossman	Far North Queensland	2014	2,428	12,445	12,693	Re-established in 2014 after being de-amalgamated from Cairns Region	
Aboriginal Shire of Hope Vale	Hope Vale	Far North Queensland	1986	1,112	999	1,006		
Aboriginal Shire of Kowanyama	Kowanyama	Far North Queensland	1987	2,555	1,108	1,143		
Aboriginal Shire of Lockhart River	Lockhart River	Far North Queensland	1987	3,576	653	659		
Aboriginal Shire of Mapoon	Mapoon	Far North Queensland	2002	537	442	452		
Shire of Mareeba	Mareeba	Far North Queensland	2014	53,491	23,174	23,372	Re-established in 2014 after being de-amalgamated from Tablelands Region	
Aboriginal Shire of Napranum	Napranum	Far North Queensland	1989	2,004	907	910		
Northern Peninsula Area Region	Bamaga	Far North Queensland	2008	1,052	2,886	2,896		
Aboriginal Shire of Pormpuraaw	Pormpuraaw	Far North Queensland	1987	4,395	632	633		
Tablelands Region	Atherton	Far North Queensland	2008	11,293	26,488	26,844	The Tablelands Region was created from the 15 March 2008 amalgamation of: the Shire of Atherton; the Shire of Eacham; the Shire of Herberton; and the Shire of Mareeba; Later, the Shire of Mareeba was being de-amalgamated from Tablelands Region on 1 January 2014.	
Shire of Torres	Thursday Island	Far North Queensland	1974	884	3,533	3,527		
Torres Strait Island Region	Thursday Island	Far North Queensland	2008	490	4,300	4,295		
Weipa Town	Weipa	Far North Queensland	1963	10.8	4,176	4,216	Administered under own Act by Rio Tinto Group	
Aboriginal Shire of Wujal Wujal	Wujal Wujal	Far North Queensland	1987	12	284	286		
Aboriginal Shire of Yarrabah	Yarrabah	Far North Queensland	1986	159	2,598	2,624		
Shire of Burke	Burketown	North West Queensland	1885	39,684	430	432		
Shire of Carpentaria	Normanton	North West Queensland	1883	64,121	2,159	2,177		
Shire of Cloncurry	Cloncurry	North West Queensland	1884	47,971	3,705	3,793		
Shire of Croydon	Croydon	North West Queensland	1887	29,498	269	269		
Aboriginal Shire of Doomadgee	Doomadgee	North West Queensland	1987	1,828	1,435	1,445		
Shire of Etheridge	Georgetown	North West Queensland	1882	39,199	724	724		
Shire of Flinders	Hughenden	North West Queensland	1882	41,200	1,521	1,540		
Shire of McKinlay	Julia Creek	North West Queensland	1891	40,737	838	848		
Shire of Mornington	Gununa	North West Queensland	1978	1,248	1,061	1,067		
City of Mount Isa	Mount Isa	North West Queensland	1914	43,713	19,226	19,092		
Shire of Richmond	Richmond	North West Queensland	1910	26,581	769	778		
Barcaldine Region	Barcaldine	Central West Queensland	2008	53,383	2,863	2,864	The Barcaldine Region was created from the 15 March 2008 amalgamation of: the Shire of Barcaldine; the Shire of Aramac; the Shire of Jericho	
Shire of Barcoo	Jundah	Central West Queensland	1885	61,830	312	318		
Blackall-Tambo Region	Blackall	Central West Queensland	2008	30,537	1,920	1,935	The Blackall-Tambo Region was created from the 15 March 2008 amalgamation of: the Shire of Blackall; the Shire of Tambo	
Shire of Boulia	Boulia	Central West Queensland	1887	60,906	470	477		
Shire of Diamantina	Bedourie	Central West Queensland	1879	94,731	270	268		
Longreach Region	Longreach	Central West Queensland	2008	40,572	3,693	3,726	The Longreach Region was created from the 15 March 2008 amalgamation of: the Shire of Longreach; the Shire of Ilfracombe; the Shire of Isisford	
Shire of Winton	Winton	Central West Queensland	1886	53,814	1,132	1,133		
Shire of Balonne	St George	South West Queensland	1883	31,104	4,379	4,362		
Shire of Bulloo	Thargomindah	South West Queensland	1880	73,724	342	343		
Maranoa Region	Roma	South West Queensland	2008	58,705	12,960	13,106	The Roma Region was created from the 15 March 2008 amalgamation of: the Town of Roma; the Shire of Bendemere; the Shire of Booringa; the Shire of Bungil; the Shire of Warroo; Later it was renamed Maranoa Region in June 2009.	
Shire of Murweh	Charleville	South West Queensland	1879	40,700	4,010	3,970		
Shire of Paroo	Cunnamulla	South West Queensland	1879	47,613	1,708	1,722		
Shire of Quilpie	Quilpie	South West Queensland	1930	67,415	702	705		

== See also ==
- List of former local government areas of Queensland
- List of places in Queensland by population
