= Acacia lithgowiae =

Scientific classification
- Kingdom: Plantae
- Clade: Embryophytes
- Clade: Tracheophytes
- Clade: Spermatophytes
- Clade: Angiosperms
- Clade: Eudicots
- Clade: Rosids
- Order: Fabales
- Family: Fabaceae
- Subfamily: Caesalpinioideae
- Clade: Mimosoid clade
- Genus: Acacia
- Species: A. lithgowiae

Binomial name
- Acacia lithgowiae Pedley

Species of legume

Acacia lithgowiae, commonly known as Lithgow's wattle, is a species of flowering plant in the family Fabaceae and is endemic to a small area of Queensland, Australia. It is a shrub with ascending to erect, mostly narrowly oblong phyllodes, spherical heads of golden yellow flowers, and linear to narrowly oblong, firmly papery to thinly leathery pods.

== Description ==
Acacia lithgowiae is a shrub that typically grows to a height of up to 2.5 m (8 ft 2 in) and has terete, finely ribbed branchlets covered with short hairs. Its phyllodes are ascending to erect, mostly narrowly oblong but narrowed towards the base, shallowly curved or straight and flat, mostly 20–40 mm (0.79–1.57 in) long, 2.5–5 mm (0.098–0.197 in) wide. The phyllodes are green and glabrous with a fairly distinct mid-vein and sometimes a gland 1–2.5 mm (0.039–0.098 in) above the pulvinus. The flowers are arranged in a spherical head in upper axils on a peduncle 3–6 mm (0.12–0.24 in) long, each head with 32 to 40 golden yellow flowers. Flowering has been recorded in August, and the pods are linear to narrowly oblong, 10–55 mm (0.39–2.17 in) long and 3–3.5 mm (0.12–0.14 in) wide, firmly papery to thinly leathery, red-brown to dark brown and low-domed over the seeds. The seeds are oblong, 3–4 mm (0.12–0.16 in) long with an oblique, cream-coloured aril.

== Taxonomy ==
Acacia lithgowiae was first formally described in 2019 by Leslie Pedley in the journal Austrobaileya from specimens collected in the Stretchworth State Forest about 40 km (25 mi) south-west of Dalby. The specific epithet (lithgowiae) honours "Ms Grace Lithgow", a keen naturalist. The type locality is a little south of the shires covered by her booklet on the wattles of the Murilla and Chinchilla shires.

== Distribution and habitat ==
This species of wattle is only known from the type locality in southern Queensland, where it grows in sandy soil overlying clay, often with Allocasuarina luehmannii and Acacia muelleriana.

== Conservation status ==
Acacia lithgowiae is listed as 'least concern' under the Queensland Nature Conservation Act 1992.

== See also ==
- List of Acacia species
