= Charles Campbell (Queensland politician) =

Member of the Queensland Legislative Council (1843–1919)

The Hon Charles Campbell
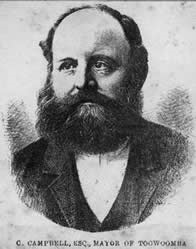

Member of the Queensland Legislative Council
- In office 3 July 1914 – 18 March 1919

Personal details
- Born: Charles Campbell; 6 August 1843 Newtown, Sydney, Australia
- Died: 18 March 1919 (aged 75) Toowoomba, Queensland, Australia
- Resting place: Drayton and Toowoomba Cemetery
- Spouse: Margaret Corr (m.1873 d.1914)
- Occupation: Shire chairman

Charles Campbell (1843–1919) was a Queensland politician and a Member of the Queensland Legislative Council. He was regarded as the "father of local government in Queensland".

== Early life ==
Charles Campbell was born about 1843 at Cook's River near Petersham, Sydney, the son of Hugh Campbell and his wife Helen White (née Fraser). He arrived on the Darling Downs, Queensland with his brother in 1864 and pursued pastoral pursuits. He married Margaret Corr on 4 November 1873 in Queensland.

== Political life ==
Charles Campbell was a member of the Jondaryan Divisional Board since its inception in 1879 and was its chairman for 25 years, which was regarded as one of the best managed in the state.

He was also a member of the Toowoomba City Council and was at one time its mayor.

On 3 July 1914 Charles Campbell was appointed to the Queensland Legislative Council for life, terminating with his death on 18 March 1919.

== Later life ==
Charles Campbell died on 18 March 1919 at his residence in Campbell Street, Toowoomba. He was buried in the Presbyterian section of Drayton and Toowoomba Cemetery on 19 March 1919.
