= Joh for Canberra =

Unsuccessful Australian political campaign

A "Joh for PM" bumper sticker. They were a common sight in Queensland during Bjelke-Petersen's campaign.

The Joh for Canberra campaign, initially known as the Joh for PM campaign, was an attempt by Queensland National Party premier Sir Joh Bjelke-Petersen to become Prime Minister of Australia. The campaign was announced in January 1987 and drew substantial support from Queensland businessmen and some conservative politicians. The campaign caused a split in the federal Coalition. It did not attract widespread support and collapsed in June 1987. The Australian Labor Party, led by Bob Hawke, went on to win the 1987 federal election with an increased majority, gaining its highest-ever number of seats until 2025. Bjelke-Petersen came under increasing scrutiny as the Fitzgerald Inquiry gained traction, and was forced out of politics altogether in December 1987.

As of 2025 this was most recent election where the National and Liberal party would not run with each other in the coalition, and the last time the National party received over 10% of the vote for the House of Representatives.

== The lead-up to the campaign ==
Bjelke-Petersen became Premier of Queensland in 1968. Although he came close to being ousted from office in 1970, he went on to become the longest-serving premier in Queensland history, and was returned to office convincingly in several elections up to the early 1980s. In 1983 and 1984, he had communicated his interest in challenging what he saw as a dangerous push towards socialism within the Hawke Labor government.

Labor won power at the federal level under Bob Hawke at the 1983 election. Bjelke-Petersen and Queensland National Party president Sir Robert Sparkes spearheaded a conservative backlash against Hawke, based in Queensland. The aim of movement was to "dismantle Labor's 'socialist' legislation, including Medicare, to support Queensland-style free enterprise and to introduce a flat-tax system". After the state Liberal Party ended the Coalition in Queensland a few months before the 1983 Queensland state election (the National Party was traditionally the senior partner in the non-Labor Coalition in Queensland), Bjelke-Petersen played up fears of a Labor-Liberal coalition and led the Nationals to victory, claiming 41 seats in the 82-seat Legislative Assembly of Queensland—one short of a majority. He then persuaded two Liberals to cross the floor and join the Nationals, allowing them to govern in their own right for the first time. At the following election, in 1986, the Nationals won an outright majority for the only time, winning a record 55% of the seats in Queensland parliament.

The idea of Bjelke-Petersen becoming prime minister was first explicitly discussed with him by Gold Coast businessmen Brian Ray and Mike Gore, in autumn 1986, not long after his comprehensive state election victory. Gore later claimed that Bjelke-Petersen was reluctant to pursue a position in federal politics. However, according to Ray, Bjelke-Petersen expressed enthusiasm for the idea and had to convince Ray and Gore of its merit. The base of the "Joh for Canberra" campaign was a group of Queensland businessmen, nicknamed the "white shoe brigade", who had enjoyed substantial patronage from the Bjelke-Petersen government. Despite Bjelke-Petersen's insistence that his campaign was driven by popular enthusiasm, the base of support for the "Joh for Canberra" campaign was always quite narrow. In the 1984 federal election, the National Party had polled only 10.63% of the vote and won 21 seats, compared to 45 for the Liberal Party and 82 for Labor.

In 1987, John Howard and Ian Sinclair were poised to lead the Liberal and National parties respectively into the 1987 election against Bob Hawke. Bjelke-Petersen believed that Howard and Sinclair had drifted too far from their conservative principles and stood no chance of defeating the Labor government in the election. After his decisive victory in the 1986 state election, Bjelke-Petersen became the "superstar of non-Labor politics in Australia", though his support was concentrated in rural areas and on the far right of the political spectrum. That apparent momentum gave Bjelke-Petersen a feeling of invulnerability, and the mistaken belief that the dynamics of Queensland politics could be replicated at a federal level.

== The campaign platform ==
Bjelke-Petersen's candidacy rested on his promotion of a 25% flat tax rate for all Australians, irrespective of income, a proposal that drew the support of Queensland businessmen and those on the right of politics. At one point, members of the "white shoe brigade" reportedly pledged millions of dollars to help the campaign, although the money never materialised.

Despite the 25% flat tax rate being the basis of Bjelke-Petersen's campaign for prime minister, it was subsequently argued that he had "no idea of how such a tax would operate [and] still less of what was needed for responsible introduction".

Other goals of his campaign, identified by Bjelke-Petersen, were restricting the power of unions, reversing Aboriginal land rights decisions and promoting states' rights.

The Nationals had a limited base of support and were unlikely to become Australia's major non-Labor party. The belief that Bjelke-Petersen could have defeated Bob Hawke in the 1987 election has been called "one of the greatest delusions ever entertained in Australian politics". Ironically, before Bjelke-Petersen began his ill-fated run for the office of prime minister, Bob Hawke and Labor stood a very serious chance of losing government, deflated by the ill-fated attempt to introduce the unpopular Australia Card, the failed "tax summit", designed to gain support for federal treasurer Paul Keating's proposed consumption tax, and the declining terms of trade.

== Joh for PM ==
Bjelke-Petersen made his intention to run for prime minister explicit on 1 January 1987, generating a flurry of media activity. It was speculated that Bjelke-Petersen would run for a federal seat in Queensland, with Wide Bay and Fairfax being singled out as possibilities. The campaign identified thirteen marginal Labor seats and eight marginal Liberal seats that it believed were viable targets for Bjelke-Petersen and The Nationals.

Despite the extensive media coverage, the campaign drew criticism from the outset. The leader of the federal Liberal Party, John Howard, said that Bjelke-Petersen was "strong on incentive but short on reality". Melbourne's Arena magazine described Bjelke-Petersen as a "populist leader... without institutional backing", who would inevitably be defeated by the established federal parties of Labor, the Nationals and the Liberals. Prime Minister Hawke could barely contain his "delight" at the conservative infighting and welcomed a potential challenge by Bjelke-Petersen.

A peculiar irony of Bjelke-Petersen's run for federal office was that his appeal had always rested on his claim to represent Queensland's interests in the face of a hostile federal political system. His pro-Queensland and anti-Commonwealth "Canberra bashing" was the most consistent aspect of his tenure as Queensland premier. Despite the challenges he faced, Bjelke-Petersen remained outspoken about his chances of becoming prime minister, declaring that nobody else in Australian politics possessed "my experience in politics, my policies for Australia, and my determination to make them work".

Although he was outwardly confident, Bjelke-Petersen had few political allies in his campaign, even on the conservative side of politics. The most significant political figure to openly back Bjelke-Petersen's campaign was Tasmanian premier Robin Gray, who enjoyed a strong personal rapport with Bjelke-Petersen. Key Liberal Party figures, such as Andrew Peacock, also sympathised with Bjelke-Petersen's run for office, but failed to sever their ties with the federal Coalition. Joseph Siracusa, who served as Bjelke-Petersen's national security advisor in the campaign, later claimed that Peacock and fellow Liberal powerbroker Ian McLachlan played "important behind the scenes roles in the affair". Siracusa recalled a conversation with prominent Queensland National Party minister Russ Hinze, in which Hinze claimed that Andrew Peacock had secretly backed the "Joh for PM" campaign to destabilise John Howard's leadership of the Liberal Party. According to Siracusa, Bjelke-Petersen had intended on a partnership whereby Bjelke-Petersen would become prime minister with Peacock as his deputy, though the fine details and practical considerations of that plan were never considered. Brisbane's Courier Mail newspaper threw its support behind the campaign and insisted that a Bjelke-Petersen victory was possible, while acknowledging that any such victory would depend on the ability of Bjelke-Petersen to carry at least twenty of Queensland's twenty-four seats in the House of Representatives.

Bjelke-Petersen held a rally in Wagga Wagga, New South Wales, on 31 January 1987, warning that the Coalition could not win government in the upcoming election, and establishing himself as the "folksy alternative" to John Howard and the Liberal Party. A Newspoll recorded from 6–8 February 1987 found that 60% of voters believed a Bjelke-Petersen–Peacock ticket would be best placed to win the upcoming federal election, against only 22% in favour of Howard and Sinclair.

== Split from Coalition ==
At the end of February 1987, the Queensland National Party decided to withdraw its twelve federal members of parliament from the Coalition, and demanded that federal National Party leader Ian Sinclair also withdraw because of "basic differences in taxation and other philosophies and policies" between the Liberal and National parties. Within the Queensland National Party, the party president, Sir Robert Sparkes, enforced support for Bjelke-Petersen, making practical opposition within the Queensland ranks unlikely. However, tensions persisted, even amongst Bjelke-Petersen's closest followers.

Although Sparkes had agreed to run the campaign, by then known as "Joh for PM", he took the post only reluctantly and had tried to dissuade Bjelke-Petersen from running for federal office. Privately, Bjelke-Petersen and Sparkes had come to detest one another, with "their hatred for each other overwhelming the courtly setting and polite manners". Bjelke-Petersen later claimed that Sparkes was responsible for the subsequent failure of the "Joh for PM" campaign. The formal notice approving Bjelke-Petersen's run for the prime ministership was passed by a Queensland National Party Central Council in February 1987. It read:

That the National Party of Australia (Qld) fully supports the move by Sir Joh Bjelke-Petersen to attain the Prime Ministership so that he can put in place an anti-socialist federal government equipped with appropriate policies and the will to implement those policies....

Despite their success in the Queensland branch, Bjelke-Petersen and his newly independent Nationals faction received a humiliating setback in the Northern Territory election on 7 March, with the National Party failing to achieve much success, despite Bjelke-Petersen's patronage and the Country Liberals continuing to dominate the territory. On 10 April, Queensland National MPs withdrew from the Coalition, leaving them in "the ridiculous position of being half in and half out of the federal National Party".

The perceived obstinacy of the Queensland National Party drew the ire of many senior Coalition members. Ian Sinclair refused to join Bjelke-Petersen's campaign and attempted to preserve the federal Coalition. On 29 April, as Hawke continued to capitalise on the Coalition's disunity, John Howard slammed the "real wreckers... Bjelke-Petersen and Sparkes, and the unilateral action of the Queensland branch [of the National Party] which set itself on a course of destruction with the Coalition". Although Howard was publicly critical of the "Joh for PM" campaign, it has been alleged that he was actually desperate to appease Bjelke-Petersen, at one point flying to Queensland to seek a compromise agreement.

The Coalition split in early May, with Sinclair looking increasingly impotent, unable to ensure the loyalty of all National Party members. At that point, Bob Sparkes reneged on his loyalty to Bjelke-Petersen and withdrew from the campaign. With his pool of supporters steadily decreasing, an effective challenge to the federal Coalition from Bjelke-Petersen began to look more and more unlikely.

== Media ==
Newspapers owned by Rupert Murdoch, particularly The Australian, offered enthusiastic early support for the "Joh for Canberra" and "Joh for PM" campaigns. The Australian was edited by a pro Bjelke-Petersen editor, Lee Hollings, and vigorously advocated for Bjelke-Petersen's campaign, providing it with "much-needed momentum" in early January 1987. The stance taken by Murdoch, combined with sympathetic coverage in the Brisbane Courier Mail, meant that the campaign received a great deal of positive media coverage. Some commentators have argued that The Australian did much to contribute to the defeat of the conservatives in the 1987 federal election. Liberal politician, Ian Macphee, has argued that the promotion of the "Joh for Canberra" and "Joh for PM" campaigns in The Australian was a case of the paper going "out of its way to fan the flames of disunity", contributing to the Hawke government's eventual victory.

Local dissent against the Bjelke-Petersen media narrative came from smaller publications. The University of Queensland's Semper Floreat, and the independent magazine The Cane Toad Times, provided authentic voices of Queensland opposition to Joh Bjelke-Petersen's campaign. The Cane Toad Times only dealt with the campaign in reference to the Fitzgerald Inquiry that ousted Bjelke-Petersen in late 1987, stating that issues like the "Joh for Canberra" campaign, as with the Bjelke-Petersen government's aggressive support of the Springboks rugby tour of 1971, as well as the industrial disputes of 1984, had served to "keep the spotlight off the only real problem the National Party government had in Queensland [which was] corruption".

Semper Floreat was a persistent critic of the "Joh for Canberra" campaign. In its regular column, "Letters from Kingaroy", the publication repeatedly mocked Bjelke-Petersen and his attempt to be elected to federal office. What both Semper Floreat and The Cane Toad Times shared was a view of Bjelke-Petersen as a repressive and autocratic figure, trying to replicate a tradition of misgovernment on the federal stage. The Cane Toad Times satirically referred to Queensland as a "new Reich", while Semper claimed that "a lot of Queensland journalists have a sense of futility because of the immense control Joh Bjelke-Petersen holds in this state".

In Brisbane, the media had a degree of diversity that was largely absent from the rest of the state. Brisbane was also the area of Queensland where Bjelke-Petersen enjoyed the least amount of support. Outside the cosmopolitan south-east of Queensland, he and the Nationals "benefited from a less diverse and competitive mass media", which helped to ensure their continuing electoral success.

== End of campaign ==
A political cartoon compares Bjelke-Petersen to Napoleon on his retreat from Moscow.

For all its fanfare, the "Joh for Canberra" campaign ended with a whimper rather than a bang. In May 1987, the expectations of Bjelke-Petersen's campaign were revised downwards to promoting Senate candidates such as John Stone, who ran under the New Nationals banner, and the slogan "Joh for PM" was scrapped in favour of "Joh for Canberra", When prime minister, Bob Hawke, called a double dissolution election on 27 May 1987, Bjelke-Petersen was in the United States, visiting Disneyland, and had not even nominated for a federal seat. His supporters at home rushed to find candidates for a pro-Bjelke-Petersen party, but were largely unsuccessful.

Despite the media furore created by the campaign, Bjelke-Petersen's bid for federal government lacked a "solid organisational basis and significant nationwide support". The bid collapsed and Bjelke-Petersen withdrew from his attempt to win a seat in federal parliament. Nonetheless, the effects of Bjelke-Petersen's grab for power were felt nationwide. With the National Party fractured, different campaigns all ran simultaneously, including "the Joh campaign, the Sinclair campaign [and] independent Joh campaigns", leading to confusion among voters.

In the federal election, Labor performed exceptionally well in Queensland, gaining four seats to bring their Queensland tally to 13 of 24 seats. Although Bjelke-Petersen had withdrawn from the nationwide contest, the National Party still ran against the Liberals in many seats, and ran independent Senate tickets in every state except New South Wales. The federal National Party suffered a net loss of two seats, failing to expand upon its traditional rural base and hampered by disunity within its ranks.

In addition to a large number of three-cornered contests, many of the practices that had worked so well for Bjelke-Petersen over the previous 19 years backfired on him. Many swinging voters outside of Queensland, alarmed at the prospect of Bjelke-Petersen holding the balance of power, opted to vote Labor in order to ensure that the Coalition would be defeated. Queensland ALP secretary Peter Beattie remarked that "we couldn't have done it without Joh".

However, Bjelke-Petersen remained unrepentant. In an interview recorded in the aftermath of the election loss, Bjelke-Petersen insisted that he did not bear any of the blame for the result, and that the only thing he had to apologise for was withdrawing from the contest. He later tried to shift the blame to Robert Sparkes' attitude to the campaign, saying that "if Sparkes hadn't gummed it up, then it would've worked". Nonetheless, Sparkes' profile continued to grow in Queensland, and he was comfortably re-elected as head of the Queensland National Party in late 1987. Bjelke-Petersen went on to state that his internal polling suggested that, had he remained in the race, he would have been very competitive.

Bjelke-Petersen was always unapologetic about his bid for federal leadership, repeatedly characterising it in his memoir as the "Joh Crusade", and insisting that he "did not want to be prime minister.... I only wanted to go to Canberra to clean up a mess and put government there back on the right path".

== Bjelke-Petersen's downfall ==
As it turned out, the "Joh for Canberra" campaign was the last hurrah for Bjelke-Petersen and the Queensland Nationals. The campaign unnerved many, even some within the Queensland National Party, with Bjelke-Petersen's actions "perceived by many senior people without his party [as those] of a person who was convinced he was greater than his party".

The Fitzgerald Inquiry into corruption in Queensland began on 26 May 1987 and quickly implicated several high-ranking members of the National Party. The charges moved steadily up the ranks of the National Party and soon came to implicate Bjelke-Petersen, who was accused of systemic corruption and, later, narrowly avoided a conviction for perjury. Bjelke-Petersen's attempts to maintain his stranglehold on the National Party came to nothing, with senior ministers soon manoeuvring to remove him from office.

On 27 November 1987, the culmination of the revolt saw Bjelke-Petersen deposed as National Party leader in favour of Mike Ahern. Bjelke-Petersen tried to stay on as premier for four more days before announcing his resignation on 1 December. A Morgan Gallup poll released three days later put Bjelke-Petersen's approval rating at a record low of 22%. In less than a year, he had gone from the apex of his political success to ruin—a surprisingly rapid decline given his long dominance of Queensland politics.

The Queensland Nationals never recovered from the revelations of rampant corruption in the Bjelke-Petersen government, and were resoundingly defeated by the ALP in the 1989 state election, suffering the worst defeat of a sitting government in Queensland history up to that time and in 2008 they merged with the Liberals to become the Liberal National Party.

== The appeal of Sir Joh ==
Sir Joh Bjelke-Petersen successfully cultivated an image as a hard-working, Queensland 'everyman'.

Many commentators have written about Bjelke-Petersen and the "Joh for Canberra" campaign in scathing terms. Historian Raymond Evans has claimed that it was waged "somewhat like Napoleon's ill-fated march on Moscow" while Rae Wear has likened Bjelke-Petersen to Mao Zedong. Much has been made of the sense of grandeur and self-delusion that seemed to pervade Bjelke-Petersen's attempt to run for federal office, and the role that Bjelke-Petersen's personality played in shaping the campaign. Wear has cited the "Joh for Canberra" campaign as an example of "the old-age immortality project, whereby narcissistic and self-made politicians defy death by erecting lasting monuments to themselves". At the time of the campaign, Bjelke-Petersen was 75 and was eager to make a permanent mark on Australian politics before his retirement from public life.

Journalist Paul Kelly concurs, noting that hubris was an important factor in Bjelke-Petersen's campaign. He quotes Bjelke-Petersen as saying "even if [the Nationals] don't win more seats than the Liberals I'll be prime minister", a statement that appears to confirm Bjelke-Petersen's self-delusion and ignorance of political realities. The widespread popularity that Bjelke-Petersen enjoyed in Queensland could not be transposed to the political atmosphere of federal politics.

While many historians have been damning about Bjelke-Petersen and his legacy, they have also acknowledged the appeal he held in his home state. His popularity essentially rested on a belief in Queensland exceptionalism. As premier, he cultivated his identification with the "ordinary, decent Queenslander and traded on small business and rural fears of rapid social change". Queensland premiers have often gained support by emphasising "rural agrarianism and mobilisation of the 'common people' against a vilifed elite," a tactic that Bjelke-Petersen mastered in his nineteen years as premier. In Queensland, Bjelke-Petersen had successfully built a coalition of religious conservatives, rural voters and business interests that could be relied upon for support. However, during the "Joh for Canberra" push, he found that his appeal did not extend nationwide and that the dynamics of Queensland politics did not apply to the nation as a whole.

== See also ==
- Vierte Partei, an attempt of the Christian Social Union in Bavaria to become a federal party in the mid-1970s.
- Strategie 18, Guido Westerwelle's campaign as first and only chancellor candidate of the Free Democratic Party 2001–2002.
