= Town of Newtown =

Local government area of Queensland, Australia

Coordinates: 27.5611°S 151.9339°E

The Town of Newtown was a local government area in the Darling Downs region of Queensland, Australia, loosely based on the current Newtown, a suburb of Toowoomba. It existed between 1913 and 1917.

== History ==
On 25 January 1913, the Shire of Gowrie was abolished and was split between the new Town of Newtown and the Shire of Jondaryan.

On 23 Feb 1917, the Town of Newtown was abolished, being split between the City of Toowoomba and the Shire of Jondaryan.

== Mayors ==
- Joseph Troy
