= Shire of Middle Ridge =

Local government area of Queensland, Australia

Coordinates: 27.604°S 151.953°E

The Shire of Middle Ridge was a local government area in the Darling Downs region of Queensland, Australia, south of Toowoomba, Queensland, centred on Middle Ridge (now a suburb of Toowoomba). It existed from 1880 to 1917.

== History ==
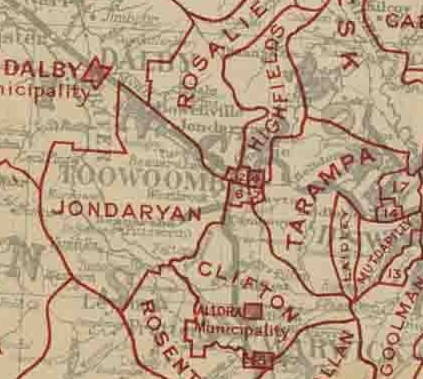
Map of Middle Ridge Shire and adjacent local government areas, March 1902. Legend: Toowoomba Municipality (4), Drayton Shire (6), Middle Ridge Division (7), Gowrie Division (12)

The Shire of Middle Ridge was established as a municipal shire on 22 May 1880. Its centre was at the intersection of Stenner and Hume Streets, where there was the shire hall, the school, and a church.

On 23 February 1917, the Shire of Middle Ridge was abolished, split between the City of Toowoomba and the Shire of Drayton. In 2008 during a major local government amalgamation, both parts of the former Shire of Middle Ridge became part of Toowoomba Region.

== Presidents ==
- 1883: Mr Stenner
- 1886–1888: John Truss
