= Shire of Gowrie =

Local government area in Queensland, Australia

Coordinates: 27.4883°S 151.8918°E

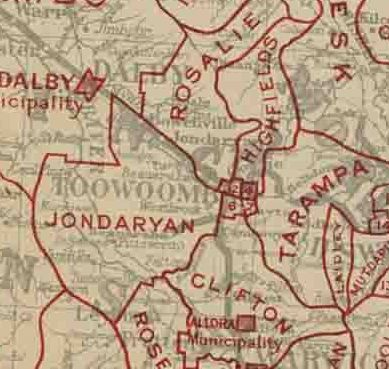
Map of Gowrie Division and adjacent local government areas, March 1902. Legend: Toowoomba Municipality (4), Drayton Shire (6), Middle Ridge Division (7), Gowrie Division (12)

The Shire of Gowrie was a local government area in the Darling Downs region of Queensland, Australia.

== History ==
The Divisional Boards Act 1879 created local government areas across Queensland; one of these was the Gowrie Division which came into existence on 11 November 1879 with a population of 2898.

On 20 August 1887, a part of the Gowrie Division was separated to form the Shire of Drayton.

The Local Authorities Act 1902 replaced divisions with towns and shires, resulting in Gowrie Division becoming the Shire of Gowrie on 31 Mar 1903.

On 25 January 1913, the Shire of Gowrie was abolished and was split between the Town of Newtown and the Shire of Jondaryan, which were eventually amalgamated into the present-day Toowoomba Region.

== Presidents ==
- 1883: James Taylor
