= Shire of Crows Nest =

Coordinates: 27°15′43.52″S 152°03′19.52″E

- Local government area
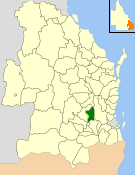
- Location within Queensland

- Country: Australia
- State: Queensland
- Region: Darling Downs
- Established: 1913
- Abolished: 2008
- Council seat: Crows Nest

Area
  - Total: 1,629.9 km^{2} (629.3 sq mi)

Population
  - Total: 12,595 (2006 census)
  - Density: 7.7275/km^{2} (20.0141/sq mi)
- Website: Shire of Crows Nest
LGAs around Shire of Crows Nest
Rosalie	Nanango	Esk
Rosalie	Shire of Crows Nest	Esk
Toowoomba	Gatton	Gatton

The Shire of Crows Nest was a local government area in the Darling Downs region of Queensland, Australia, immediately northeast of the regional city of Toowoomba. The shire, administered from the town of Crows Nest, covered an area of 1,629.9 square kilometres (629.3 sq mi), and existed as a local government entity from 1913 until 2008, when it amalgamated with several other councils in the Toowoomba area to form the Toowoomba Region. Its growth in later years has been fuelled by the expansion of Toowoomba, particularly the suburbs of Highfields and Blue Mountain Heights which, with a combined population of 7,333 in 2006, were home to over half the shire's population.

== History ==
Crows Nest was named after an Aboriginal man called Jimmy Crow, who lived in a hollow tree near the present council swimming pool. Timber hauling bullock teams would stop in this area overnight and Jimmy Crow used to give them directions. There is a 6 feet (1.8 m) statue of Jimmy Crow in Centenary Park, Crows Nest to honour this legend.

The first local government in the area was the Highfields Division, which was incorporated on 11 November 1879 under the Divisional Boards Act 1879. With the passage of the Local Authorities Act 1902, Highfields Division became the Shire of Highfields on 31 March 1903.

On 25 January 1913, the Shire of Crows Nest was excised from the Shire of Highfields, initially over a somewhat smaller area. When the Shires of Highfields and Drayton were abolished on 19 March 1949, part of each was included within the Shire of Crows Nest. The council had two divisions each of which returned four councillors, and a separately elected chairman (mayor from 1993).

On 15 March 2008, under the Local Government (Reform Implementation) Act 2007 passed by the Parliament of Queensland on 10 August 2007, the Shire of Crows Nest merged with the City of Toowoomba and the Shires of Cambooya, Clifton, Jondaryan, Millmerran, Pittsworth and Rosalie to form the Toowoomba Region.

== Towns and localities ==
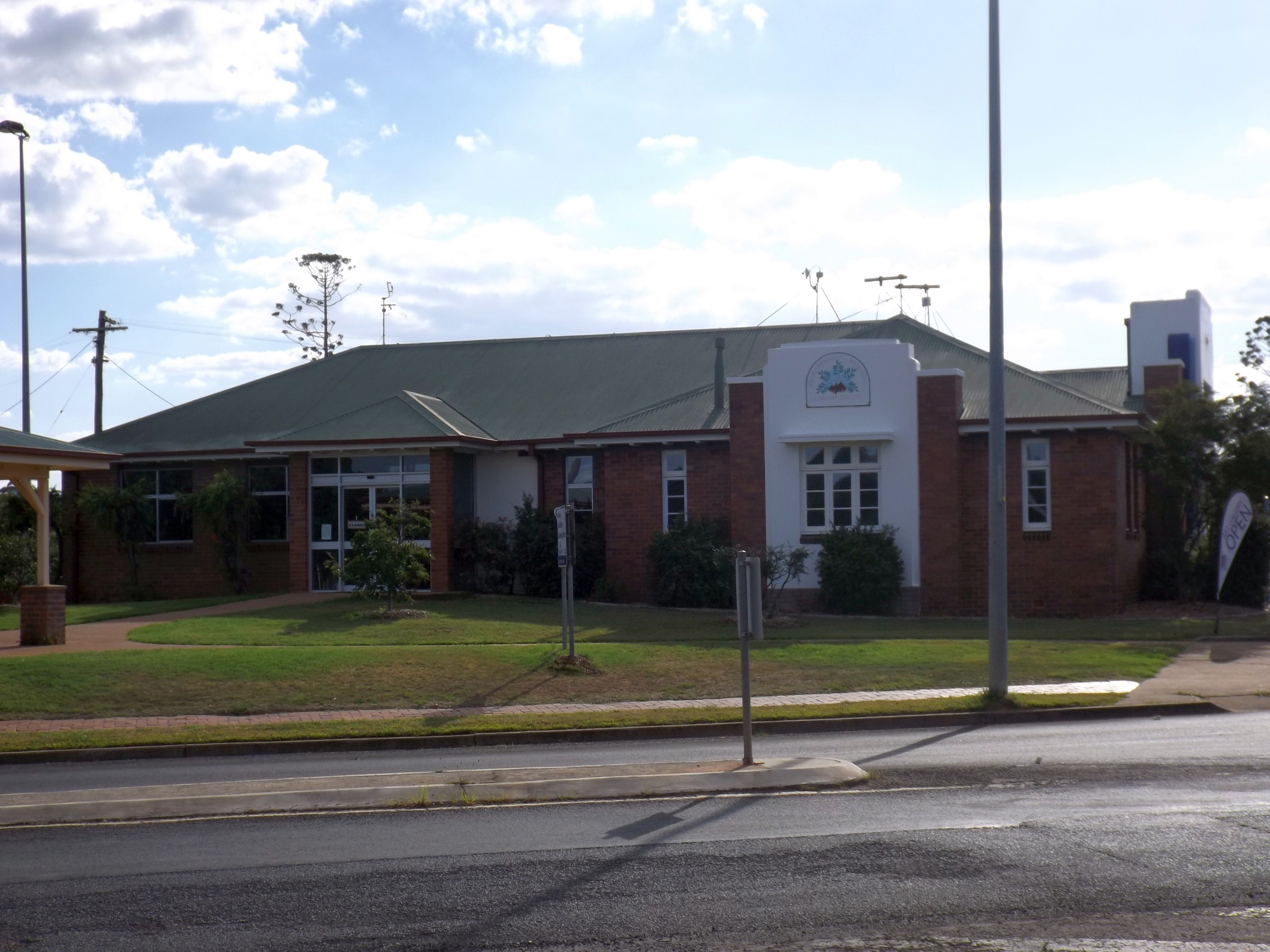
Former Crows Nest Shire offices, 2014

The Shire of Crows Nest includes the following settlements:

- Crows Nest
- Birnam^{1}
- Blue Mountain Heights^{1}
- Cabarlah
- Cawdor
- Djuan
- Geham
- Haden
- Hampton
- Highfields^{1}
- Kleinton
- Meringandan
- Pechey
- Ravensbourne
- Spring Bluff^{1}

^{1} – split with the former City of Toowoomba

== Chairmen ==
The following were the chairmen of the Crows Nest Shire Council. The use of the title mayor was only introduced in 1993.

#	chairman	Term
1	James Nolan	1913
2	John Alexander McRae	1914
3	Lewis Dascombe	1915
4	Alfred Trevethen Littleton	1916
5	Alfred King	1917
6	Maurice Collins	1918
7	Alfred Trevethen Littleton	1919—1930
8	John Breydon	1930—1933
9	Alfred Trevethen Littleton	1933—1946
10	Johann Christian Vandersee	1946—1967
11	Ernest Matthies Schefe	1967—1970
12	Colin Alan Littleton	1970—1988
13	Ivan Albert Vonhoff	1988—1993
14	Geoffrey Robert Patch	1993—2008 (mayor)

== Population ==
Year	Population
1933	2,850
1947	2,361 #
1954	3,733
1961	3,474
1966	3,244
1971	3,111
1976	3,445
1981	4,125
1986	5,308
1991	6,644
1996	8,644
2001	10,005
2006	12,595

# The estimated 1947 population of the post-1949 area was 4,036.

== Notable residents ==
- John French VC (1914–1942)
- Ben Walker Rugby League Player
- Chris Walker Rugby League Player
- Shane Walker Rugby League Player
