= Shire of Gatton =

Coordinates: 27°33′31.55″S 152°16′32.62″E

- Local government area
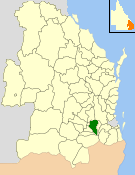
- Location within Queensland

- Country: Australia
- State: Queensland
- Established: 1880
- Council seat: Gatton

Area
  - Total: 1,571.8 km^{2} (606.9 sq mi)

Population
  - Total: 15,572 (2006 census)
  - Density: 9.9071/km^{2} (25.6593/sq mi)
- Website: Shire of Gatton
LGAs around Shire of Gatton
Toowoomba	Crows Nest	Esk
Cambooya	Shire of Gatton	Laidley
Clifton	Warwick	Boonah

The Shire of Gatton was a local government area located in the Lockyer Valley region between the cities of Toowoomba and Ipswich, and about 90 kilometres (56 mi) west of Brisbane, the state capital of Queensland, Australia. The shire covered an area of 1,571.8 square kilometres (606.9 sq mi), and existed from 1880 until its merger with the Shire of Laidley to form the Lockyer Valley Region on 15 March 2008.

== History ==
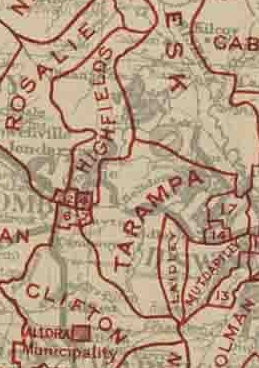
Map of Tarampa Division and adjacent local government areas, March 1902. Legend: Toowoomba Municipality (4), Middle Ridge Shire (7), Rosewood Division (14), Walloon Division (17)

Tarampa Division was created on 15 January 1880 under the Divisional Boards Act 1879, and its board held its first meeting on 20 February 1880. On 25 April 1888, the Laidley Division area broke away and separately incorporated, and on 25 January 1890, the Forest Hill area moved from Tarampa Division to Laidley Division.

With the passage of the Local Authorities Act 1902, Tarampa Division became the Shire of Tarampa on 31 March 1903.

On 3 September 1938, the Shire of Tarampa was renamed the Shire of Gatton. On 19 March 1949 it grew to incorporate part of the former Shires of Drayton and Highfields, while losing some of its original area to the City of Toowoomba and Shire of Crows Nest.

On 15 March 2008, under the Local Government (Reform Implementation) Act 2007 passed by the Parliament of Queensland on 10 August 2007, the Shire of Gatton merged with the Shire of Laidley to form the Lockyer Valley Region.

== Structure ==
The Shire of Gatton was divided into three divisions electing a total of eight councillors, plus a popularly elected mayor.

- Division One (4 councillors)—eastern area, including Gatton.
- Division Two (2 councillors)—central area, including Grantham and Helidon.
- Division Three (2 councillors)—western area, including Withcott.

== Towns and localities ==
The Shire of Gatton included the following settlements:

- Gatton
- Adare
- Blanchview
- Caffey
- Carpendale
- College View
- Flagstone Creek
- Fordsdale
- Grantham
- Helidon
- Ingoldsby
- Iredale
- Junction View
- Lake Clarendon
- Lawes
- Lower Tenthill
- Ma Ma Creek
- Mount Sylvia
- Mount Whitestone
- Murphys Creek
- Postmans Ridge
- Placid Hills
- Ropeley
- Thornton
- Upper Tenthill
- Veradilla
- Winwill
- Withcott
- Woodlands

== Population ==
Year	Population
1933	6,053
1947	6,403
1954	7,137
1961	7,594
1966	7,814
1971	8,099
1976	8,689
1981	9,675
1986	11,734
1991	13,810
1996	14,730
2001	14,925
2006	15,572

== Mayors ==
- Bernie Sutton (1993–2000)
- Ray Ferdinand (2000–2001)
- Jim McDonald (2002–2004)
- Steve Jones (2004–2008)
