= Shire of Tara =

Coordinates: 27°16′34″S 150°27′24.2″E

- Local government area
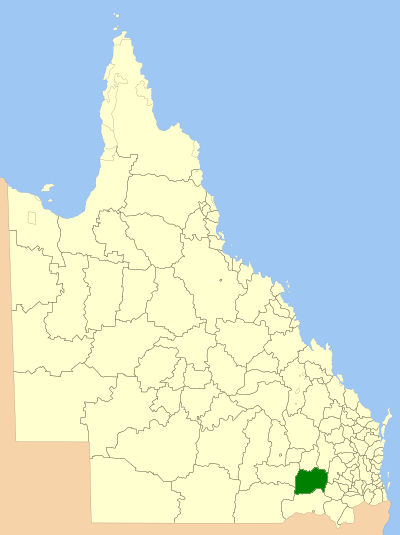
- Location within Queensland

- Country: Australia
- State: Queensland
- Region: Darling Downs
- Established: 1912
- Abolished: 2008
- Council seat: Tara

Area
  - Total: 11,682.3 km^{2} (4,510.6 sq mi)

Population
  - Total: 3,676 (2006 census)
  - Density: 0.31466/km^{2} (0.81498/sq mi)
- Website: Shire of Tara
LGAs around Shire of Tara
Warroo	Murilla	Chinchilla
Warroo	Shire of Tara	Wambo
Balonne	Waggamba	Millmerran

The Shire of Tara was a local government area in the Darling Downs region of Queensland, Australia. The shire, administered from the town of Tara, covered an area of 11,682.3 square kilometres (4,510.6 sq mi), and existed as a local government entity from 1912 until 2008, when it amalgamated with the Town of Dalby and the Shires of Chinchilla, Murilla and Wambo and the southern part of Taroom to form the Western Downs Region.

Important industries in the area include wheat, beef and wool. In recent years there have been large scale rural subdivisions developed in the area. Prickly pear infestation in the early 1900s had a devastating effect on the area that was only alleviated by the introduction of the cactoblastis moth.

Attractions in Tara include Southwood National Park, a remnant area of the southern brigalow belt.

== History ==
The Shire of Tara was established on 12 January 1912 by severance from the Shire of Wambo.

On 15 March 2008, under the Local Government (Reform Implementation) Act 2007 passed by the Parliament of Queensland on 10 August 2007, the Shire of Tara merged with the Town of Dalby and the Shires of Chinchilla, Murilla and Wambo and the southern part of Taroom to form the Western Downs Region.

== Towns and localities ==
The Shire of Tara included the following settlements:

Towns:

- Tara
- Glenmorgan
- Moonie
- The Gums

Localities:

- Flinton
- Goranba
- Meandarra
- Weranga
- Westmar

== Chairmen ==
- 1927: Andrew Watt Adams

== Population ==
Year	Population
1921	1,313
1933	1,785
1947	2,278
1954	3,149
1961	3,558
1966	3,525
1971	3,337
1976	3,098
1981	3,116
1986	3,656
1991	3,624
1996	3,501
2001	3,806
2006	3,584
