= Shire of Rosalie =

Coordinates: 27.307°S 151.843°E

- Local government area
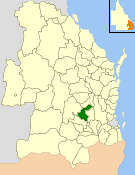
- Location within Queensland

- Country: Australia
- State: Queensland
- Region: Darling Downs
- Established: 1879
- Council seat: Goombungee

Area
  - Total: 2,200.7 km^{2} (849.7 sq mi)

Population
  - Total: 8,893 (2006 census)
  - Density: 4.0410/km^{2} (10.4661/sq mi)
LGAs around Shire of Rosalie
Wambo	Nanango	Nanango
Wambo	Shire of Rosalie	Crows Nest
Jondaryan	Jondaryan	Toowoomba

The Shire of Rosalie was a local government area in the Darling Downs region of Queensland, Australia, immediately northwest of the regional city of Toowoomba. The shire, administered from the town of Goombungee, covered an area of 2,200.7 square kilometres (849.7 sq mi), and existed as a local government entity from 1879 until 2008. In 2008, it amalgamated with several other councils in the Toowoomba area to form the Toowoomba Region.

== Geography ==
The Shire of Rosalie was centred approximately 40 kilometres (25 mi) north-northwest of the city of Toowoomba, 170 kilometres (106 mi) west of Brisbane and 240 kilometres (149 mi) northwest of the Gold Coast. The shire offices were located in Goombungee, with the shire boundary stretching in a triangular pattern north to Yarraman, southwest to Bowenville and southeast to Gowrie Junction.

== Commerce and industry ==
Industry in Rosalie Shire centred on the towns of Yarraman and Goombungee. Goombungee contains M & S Steel Buildings, and Leicht's Country Industries Australia. Other enterprises within the Shire included cluster industries, a private dairy factory, orchards, boutique cheese-makers, vineyards and wineries, accommodation operators, tour operators, aged care facility provision, an immigration hostel, a correctional facility and host-farming (farm-stay holidays).

Goombungee was in many ways the centre of Rosalie Shire. A town with approximately 750 persons, the shire's head office was in Goombungee, along with the main branch of the library. Recently moving to new premises nearby, the library made way for a dedicated art gallery within the Shire Office's building. Also located in Goombungee are the Goombungee State School, swimming pool, general store, Australia Post office, police station, hardware store, Pioneer Arms Hotel, historical society, two garages, road depot, large sporting oval including lighted tennis courts, hairdresser, doctor's offices and just 2 kilometres (1.2 mi) south, a nine-hole golf course.

== History ==
Rosalie Shire was one of the earliest areas settled in the Darling Downs region of South East Queensland. The first settlers in the area were Henry Hughes and Henry Isaac, who squatted on land surrounding Gowrie Creek and took up a 32-kilometre (20 mi) frontage along the creek. They were soon followed by others who took up sheep runs in the Darling Downs portion of the Shire. Soon the whole area was occupied by only three vast stations: Gowrie-Goombungee, Westbrook and Rosalie Plains. In the 1860s, railways — particularly the main Western line near the Shire's southern boundary — became a lifeline and permitted agricultural development and expansion to occur.

== Governance ==
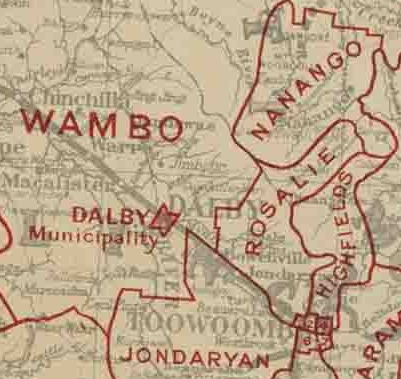
Map of Rosalie Division and adjacent local government areas, March 1902

The first local government was the Rosalie Division incorporated on 11 November 1879 under the Divisional Boards Act 1879 with a population of 1409.

With the passage of the Local Authorities Act 1902, Rosalie Division became Shire of Rosalie on 31 March 1903. Initially, the boundaries of the Shire were far from clear, with many adjustments being made with adjoining Shires up until 1914.

Declining terms of trade for dairy farmers in the post-World War II period, along with mechanisation in agriculture, led to a decline in the Shire's population, reaching its lowest level since early settlement in the mid-1970s. However, wine-making, tourism and the growth of Toowoomba as an urban centre into the Shire's southern areas provided something of a revival.

The council consisted of an elected mayor and eight councillors, and was not subdivided into wards.

On 15 March 2008, under the Local Government (Reform Implementation) Act 2007 passed by the Parliament of Queensland on 10 August 2007, the Shire of Rosalie merged with the City of Toowoomba and the Shires of Cambooya, Clifton, Crows Nest, Jondaryan, Millmerran and Pittsworth to form the Toowoomba Region.

== Towns and localities ==
The Shire of Rosalie includes the following settlements:

- Goombungee
- Acland
- Bowenville^{1}
- Evergreen
- Glencoe
- Gowrie Junction^{1, 2}
- Kingsthorpe^{1}
- Meringandan West
- Cooyar
- Upper Yarraman
- Yarraman

^{1} - split with the former Shire of Jondaryan
^{2} - split with the former City of Toowoomba

== Population ==
Year	Population
1933	7,095
1947	6,716
1954	6,538
1961	6,190
1966	5,571
1971	4,790
1976	4,728
1981	5,216
1986	6,615
1991	7,295
1996	8,035
2001	8,335
2006	8,993

== Chairmen and mayors ==
- 1880–1894: John Frederick McDougall, Member of the Queensland Legislative Council 1860—1895
- 1894–1895: R. Sharpe
- 1895–1896: Henry Venn King
- 1896–1897: Daniel McMahon
- 1897–1898: John Mathieson
- 1898–1899: H.P. Dunn
- 1899–1900: F. Wockner
- 1900–1901: R. Sharpe
- 1901–1902: Henry Venn King
- 1902–1903: Daniel McMahon
- 1903–1904: Henry Venn King
- 1904–1905: John Bews
- 1905–1906: J.S. Lee
- 1906–1907: John Bews
- 1907–1910: Alfred James Luke, Member of the Queensland Legislative Assembly for the electoral district of Aubigny 1912–1915
- 1910–1911: Henry Venn King
- 1911–1929: Arthur Edward Moore, Member of the Queensland Legislative Assembly for the electoral district of Aubigny 1912–1941 and Premier of Queensland 1929–1932
- 1929–1936: Morris Harland
- 1936–1939: Henry John Winten
- 1939–1946: J.J. Gleeson
- 1946–1962: S.A. Plant
- 1962–1973: W.F. Kajewski
- 1973–1997: Alick Williams
- 1997–2008: Noel Strohfeld
