= Shire of Clifton =

Coordinates: 27°55′53.6″S 151°54′30.7″E

- Local government area
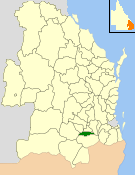
- Location within Queensland

- Country: Australia
- State: Queensland
- Region: Darling Downs
- Established: 1879
- Council seat: Clifton

Area
  - Total: 867.5 km^{2} (334.9 sq mi)

Population
  - Total: 2,549 (2006 census)
  - Density: 2.9383/km^{2} (7.6102/sq mi)
- Website: Shire of Clifton
LGAs around Shire of Clifton
Pittsworth	Cambooya	Cambooya
Millmerran	Shire of Clifton	Gatton
Warwick	Warwick	Warwick

The Shire of Clifton was a local government area in the Darling Downs region of Queensland, Australia, southwest of the regional city of Toowoomba. The shire, administered from the town of Clifton, covered an area of 867.5 square kilometres (334.9 sq mi), and existed as a local government entity from 1879 until 2008, when it amalgamated with several other councils in the Toowoomba area to form the Toowoomba Region.

== History ==
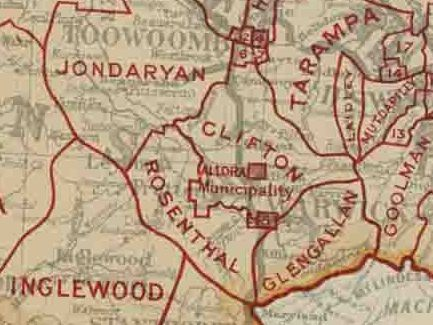
Map of Clifton Division and adjacent local government areas, March 1902. Legend: Toowoomba Municipality (4), Warwick Municipality (5), Drayton Shire (6), Middle Ridge Division (7), Gowrie Division (12), Normanby Division (13), Rosewood Division (14), Walloon Division (17)

The Clifton Division was incorporated on 11 November 1879 under the Divisional Boards Act 1879 with a population of 1382.

With the passage of the Local Authorities Act 1902, the Clifton Division became the Shire of Clifton on 31 March 1903.

On 23 January 1915, part of the Shire of Clifton was amalgamated with the Town of Allora to create the new Shire of Allora. The Shire of Clifton continued with smaller boundaries.

On 15 March 2008, under the Local Government (Reform Implementation) Act 2007 passed by the Parliament of Queensland on 10 August 2007, the Shire of Clifton merged with the City of Toowoomba and the Shires of Cambooya, Crows Nest, Jondaryan, Millmerran, Pittsworth and Shire of Rosalie to form the Toowoomba Region.

== Towns and localities ==
The Shire of Clifton includes the following settlements:

- Clifton
- Kings Creek
- Nobby^{1}
- Pilton

^{1} - split with the former Shire of Cambooya

== Population ==
Year	Population
1933	3,105
1947	2,760
1954	2,542
1961	2,572
1966	2,549
1971	2,378
1976	2,260
1981	2,188
1986	2,354
1991	2,301
1996	2,308
2001	2,327
2006	2,549

== Chairmen and mayors ==
The leaders of the Clifton Division and Clifton Shire were:

=== Clifton Divisional Board ===
- Charles Clarke (1880—1881)
- James Hanly (1881—1882)
- Thomas Grimes (1882—1883)
- William Deacon (1883—1885)
- George Clarke (1886—1888)
- William Deacon (1889—1890)
- James Hanly (1890—1891)
- John Logan (1891—1892)
- John Keleher (1892—1893)
- Andrew Gordon (1893—1894)
- James Hanly (1894—1895)
- Edward Harvey (1895—1896)
- John Logan (1896—1897)
- Edward Harvey (1897—1898)
- Maas Henry Hinz (1899—1900)
- James Bourke (1900—1901)
- Jeremiah Collins (1901—1902)
- John Keleher (1902—1903)

=== Clifton Shire Council ===
- Charles Young Gillam (1903—1904)
- Bernard McGovern (1904—1905)
- John Logan (1905—1906)
- Charles Young Gillam (1906—1907)
- John O'Sullivan (1907—1908)
- Edward Cooper (1908—1909)
- Phillip Henry Imhoff (1909—1910)
- John Logan (1910—1911)
- James Purcell (1911—1913)
- Henry Allen Smith (1913—1914)
- James Bourke (1914—1915)
- John Logan (1915—1916)
- John Gallagher (1916—1917)
- James Meara (1917—1921)
- Walter Robert Ross (1922—1923)
- James Meara (1924—1947)
- Heinrich Heinrichsen (1947—1949)
- Herbert Warfield (1949—1955)
- William Bourke (1955—1967)
- William Finlay (1967—1976)
- Virgil O'Leary (1976—1979)
- William Bishop (1979—1982)
- Emmett Lyons (1982—1991)
- Ian Jones (1991—1994)
- Reg Murphy (1994—1997)
- Patricia Collins (1997—2004)
- Ian Jones (2004—2008)
