= Shire of Taroom =

Coordinates: 25°38′27″S 149°47′50.5″E

- Local government area
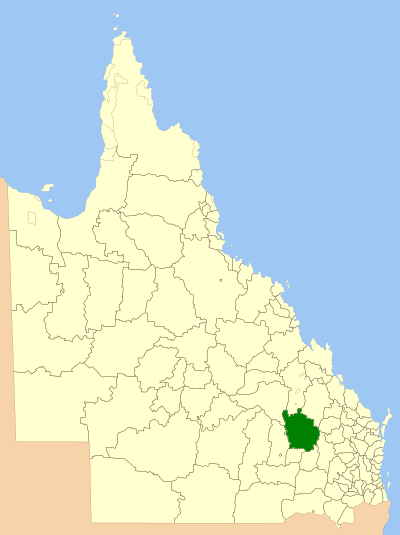
- Location within Queensland

- Country: Australia
- State: Queensland
- Region: Darling Downs
- Established: 1879
- Council seat: Taroom

Area
  - Total: 18,644.5 km^{2} (7,198.7 sq mi)

Population
  - Total: 2,389 (2006 census)
  - Density: 0.128134/km^{2} (0.33187/sq mi)
- Website: Shire of Taroom
LGAs around Shire of Taroom
Bauhinia	Duaringa	Banana
Bungil	Shire of Taroom	Eidsvold
Bendemere	Murilla	Chinchilla

The Shire of Taroom was a local government area in the Darling Downs region of Queensland, Australia, along the Leichhardt Highway to the north of Miles. The shire covered an area of 18,644.5 square kilometres (7,198.7 sq mi), and existed as a local government area from 1879 until 2008, when it was dissolved and split between the new Western Downs Region and the Shire of Banana.

The shire contained several national parks with eroded sandstone areas, as well as Isla Gorge.

== History ==
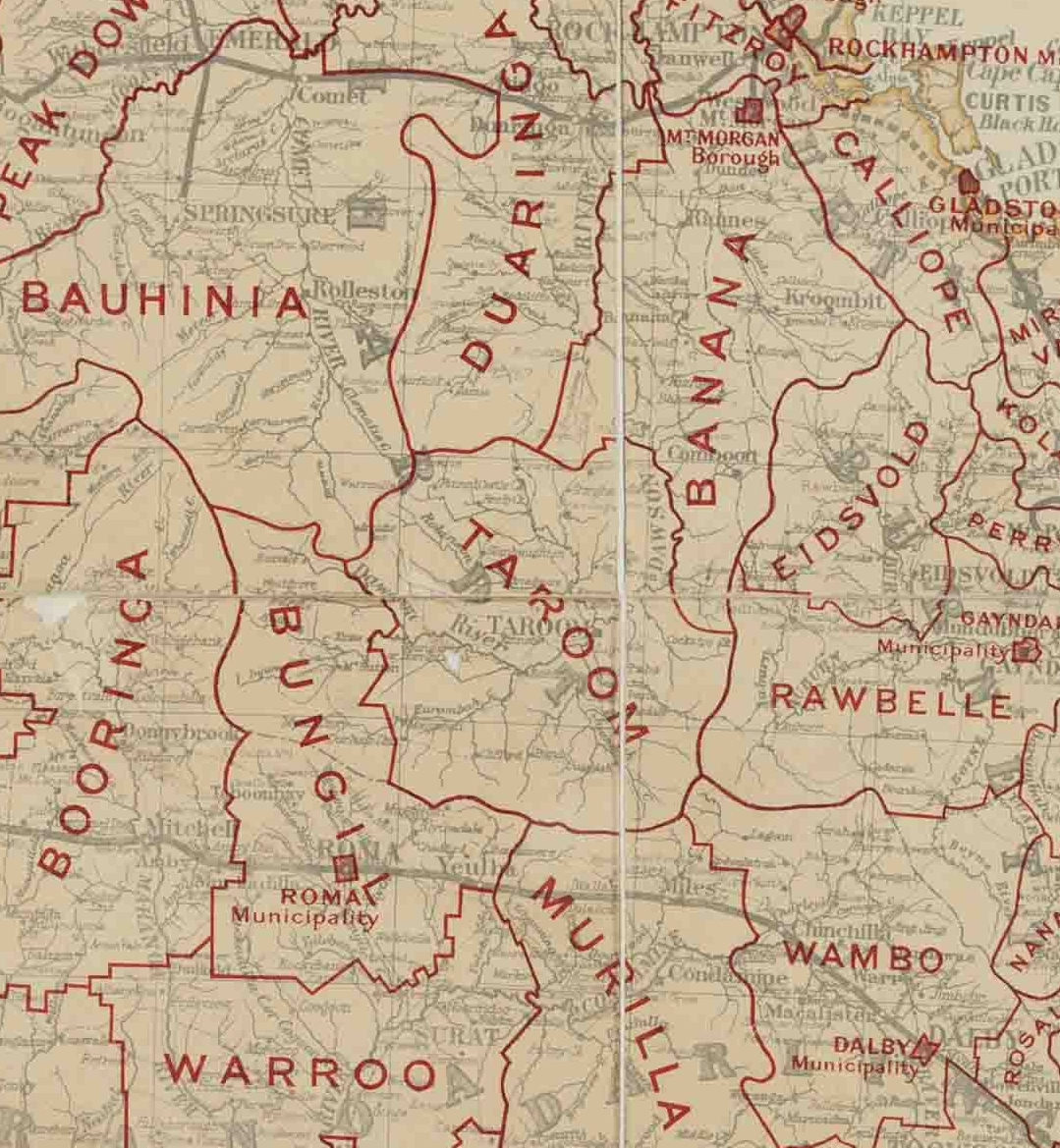
Map of Taroom Division and adjacent local government areas, March 1902

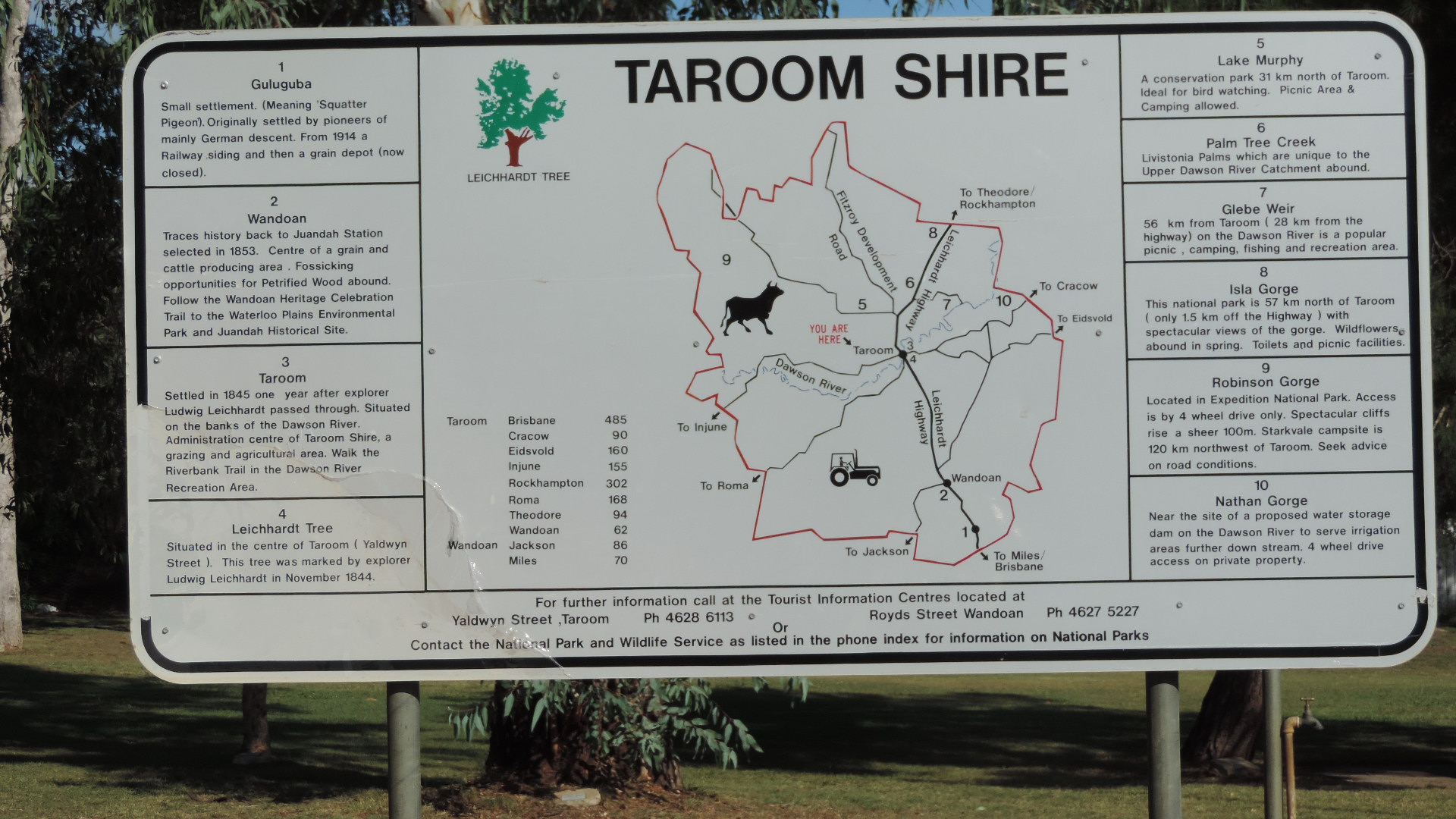
Tourist information for the (former) Shire of Taroom, 2014

Taroom Division was created on 11 November 1879 as one of 74 divisions around Queensland under the Divisional Boards Act 1879 with a population of 1015.

With the passage of the Local Authorities Act 1902, Taroom Division became the Shire of Taroom on 31 March 1903.

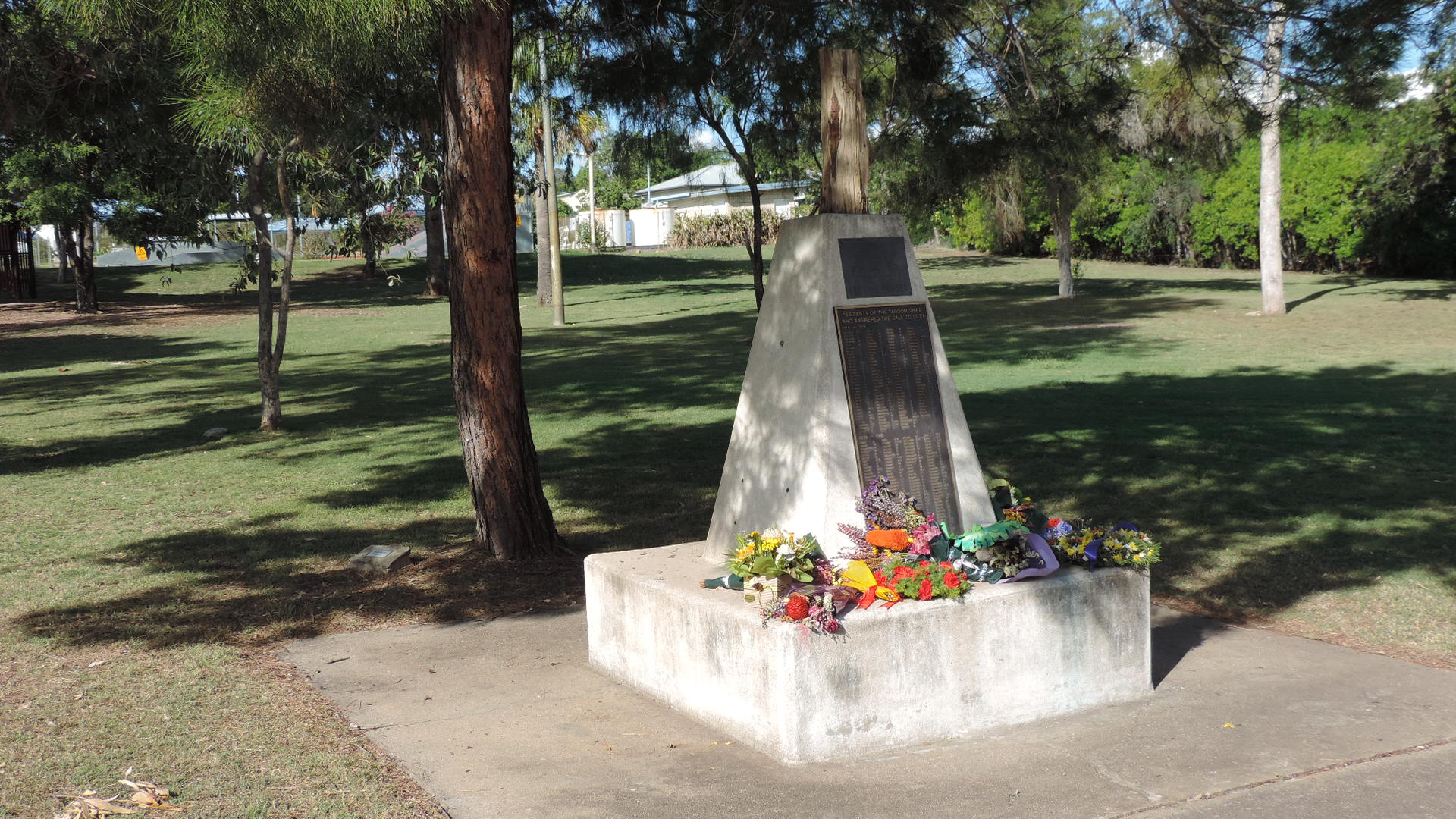
War memorial, Taroom, 2014

The Taroom War Memorial commemorates residents of Taroom Shire who served in World War I, World War II and the Vietnam War. It is located at the Ludwig Leichhardt Park in Yaldwyn Street and was dedicated in about 1973.

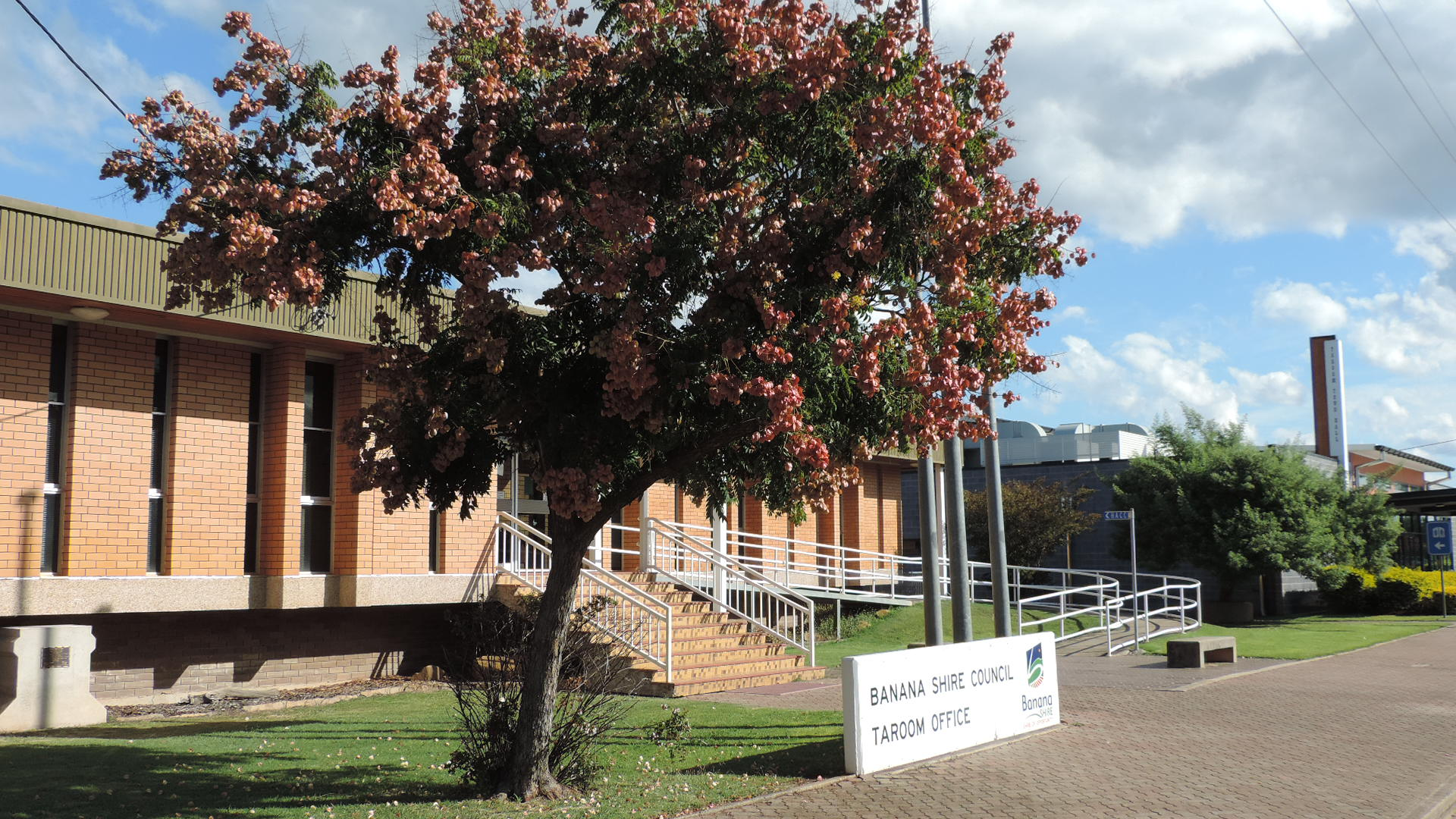
The former Taroom Shire Council Chambers, Taroom, 2014

The Taroom Shire Council Chambers were located at 18 Yaldwyn Street, now used as the Taroom administration office of the Banana Shire Council.

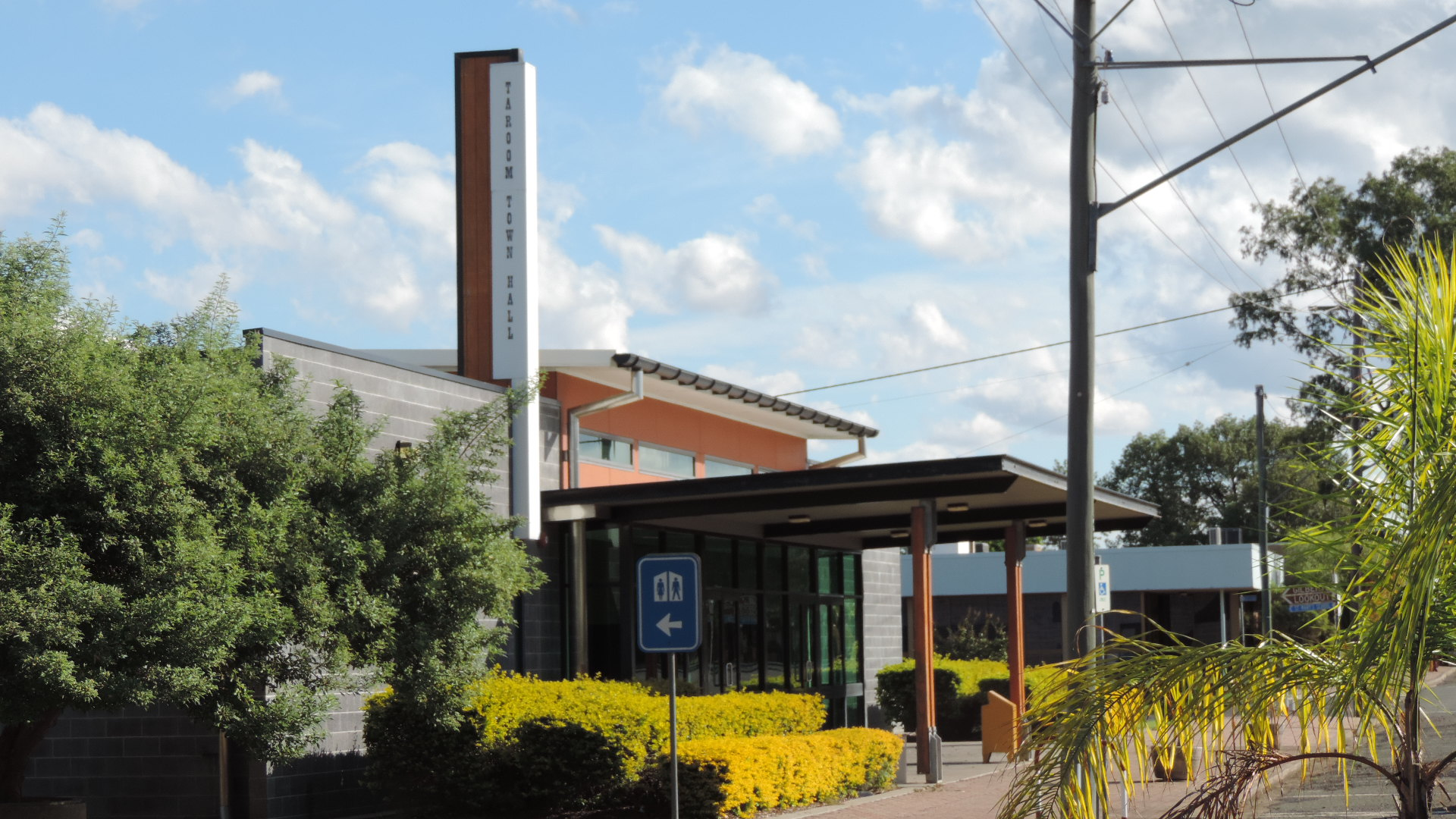
Taroom town hall, 2014

The Taroom Town Hall was built in 2004, immediately next door to the shire council chambers. It was intended to serve as a civic and recreational centre for the town and has a main auditorium that seats 300 people, a commercial kitchen, and a bar. The hall was awarded a regional commendation by the Royal Australian Institute of Architects in 2004.

On 15 March 2008, under the Local Government (Reform Implementation) Act 2007 passed by the Parliament of Queensland on 10 August 2007, the Shire of Taroom was dissolved. Division 1 of the shire, centred on the town of Taroom, was merged into the Shire of Banana. The remainder of the Shire of Taroom, centred on the town of Wandoan was merged with the Town of Dalby and the shires of Chinchilla, Murilla, Tara and Wambo to create the new Dalby Region, renamed Western Downs Region on 29 June 2009. In doing so, Taroom became one of the only three former shires in Queensland not to stay intact, alongside the shires of Tiaro and Beaudesert.

On 29 September 2018, Taroom & District Historical Society Inc and Taroom RSL Sub Branch worked together to preserve the 1973 War Memorial by moving it from Ludwig Leichhardt Park to the Taroom Museum at 17 Kelman Street, Taroom (on the original site of the Taroom State School 1871–1956). A new war memorial was erected in the park on 18 August 2019 (Vietnam Veterans Remembrance Day).

== Towns and localities ==
The Shire of Taroom included the following settlements:

Division 1 (now part of the Shire of Banana):

- Taroom
- Ghinghinda
- Glenhaughton
- Gwambegwine

Division 2 (now part of the Western Downs Region):

- Grosmont
- Guluguba
- Wandoan

== Population ==
Year	Population
1921	1,675
1933	1,534
1947	1,921
1954	2,381
1961	3,250
1966	3,367
1971	3,494
1976	3,103
1981	3,237
1986	3,297
1991	3,066
1996	2,733
2001	2,664
2006	2,389

== Chairmen and mayors ==
This is a list of chairmen and mayors of Taroom Shire Council:

- 1880–????: Charles James Royds
- 1898–1902 George Cartwright Langhorne
- 1902–1914: Alfred Ernest Devine
- 1914–1918: William John Ashton
- 1918–1943 John Mundell
- 1943–1944 Barney Carr Clark
- 1944–1945 Alfred William Henry Villiers (administrator)
- 1945–1946: Barney Carr Clark
- 1946–1954: Richard (Dick) Rigby
- 1954–1955: J.R. Knack
- 1955–1957: Henry G. Weldon
- 1957–1964: Donald Stuart Scott
- 1964–1979: Gustav Arthur Stiller
- 1979–1994: William Harold Copeland
- 1994–1997: Colin Jame Kehl
- 1997–2008: Donald Frank (Don) Stiller
