= Shire of Jondaryan =

Coordinates: 27°26′02.3″S 151°43′14″E

- Local government area
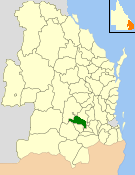
- Location within Queensland

- Country: Australia
- State: Queensland
- Region: Darling Downs
- Established: 1890
- Council seat: Oakey

Area
  - Total: 1,910.0 km^{2} (737.5 sq mi)

Population
  - Total: 13,965 (2006 census)
  - Density: 7.3115/km^{2} (18.9367/sq mi)
LGAs around Shire of Jondaryan
Wambo	Wambo	Rosalie
Wambo	Shire of Jondaryan	Toowoomba
Millmerran	Pittsworth	Cambooya

The Shire of Jondaryan was a local government area located in the Darling Downs region of Queensland, Australia, immediately west of the regional city of Toowoomba. The shire, administered from the town of Oakey, covered an area of 1,910.0 square kilometres (737.5 sq mi), and existed as a local government entity from 1890 until 2008, when it amalgamated with several other councils in the Toowoomba area to form the Toowoomba Region. Its growth in later years has been fuelled by the expansion of Toowoomba and suburbs such as Glenvale and Westbrook.

== History ==
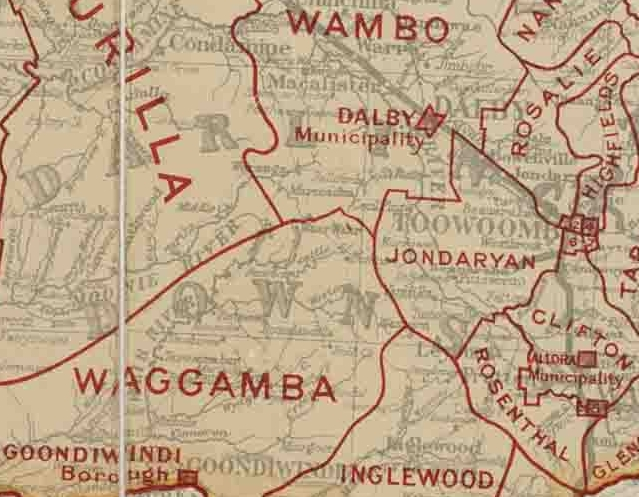
Map of Jondaryan Division and adjacent local government areas, March 1902

Jondaryan Division was created on 11 November 1879 as one of 74 divisions around Queensland under the Divisional Boards Act 1879 with a population of 1738. The divisional offices were located in Toowoomba, Queensland, outside of the division.

With the passage of the Local Authorities Act 1902, Jondaryan Division became Shire of Jondaryan on 31 March 1903. Until 1960, the Shire's offices were located at Snell and Russell Streets, Toowoomba. Many of the council's original staff and councillors were associated with the Jondaryan Estates pastoral empire.

On 25 January 1913, the Shire of Gowrie was abolished and was split between the new Town of Newtown and the Shire of Jondaryan.

On 24 April 1913 the Millmerran and Pittsworth areas to its southwest seceded from the Shire of Jondaryan and separately incorporated as shires.

On 23 Feb 1917, the Town of Newtown was abolished, being split between the City of Toowoomba and the Shire of Jondaryan.

On 19 March 1949, Jondaryan received part of the former Shire of Drayton when it was abolished.

In 1960, the Shire's headquarters moved from Toowoomba (outside the shire) to the town of Oakey (within the shire).

On 15 March 2008, under the Local Government (Reform Implementation) Act 2007 passed by the Parliament of Queensland on 10 August 2007, the Shire of Jondaryan merged with the City of Toowoomba and the Shires of Cambooya, Clifton, Crows Nest, Millmerran, Pittsworth and Shire of Rosalie to form the Toowoomba Region.

== Towns and localities ==
The Shire of Jondaryan includes the following settlements:

- Oakey
- Athol
- Aubigny
- Bowenville^{1}
- Charlton^{1}
- Cotswold Hills^{1}
- Evanslea
- Glenvale^{2}
- Gowrie Junction^{1, 2}
- Gowrie Mountain
- Grassdale
- Jondaryan
- Kingsthorpe^{1}
- Torrington^{2}
- Wyreema^{3}

^{1} - split with the former Shire of Rosalie
^{2} - split with the former City of Toowoomba
^{3} - split with the former Shire of Cambooya

== Population ==
Year	Population
1933	5,231
1947	5,346
1954	5,416
1961	5,785
1966	5,752
1971	5,704
1976	6,576
1981	7,832
1986	9,457
1991	10,308
1996	11,056
2001	12,323
2006	13,965

== Chairmen and mayors ==
The Jondaryan Division and Shire had the following leaders:

=== Chairmen of Jondaryan Division ===
- 1880–1892: James Taylor
- 1892–1894: Francis Gore
- 1894–1896: Gilbert Cory
- 1896–1919: Charles Campbell

=== Chairmen of Jondaryan Shire ===
- 1896–1919: Charles Campbell
- 1919–1945: William Kent
- 1945–1955: Alan Paull
- 1955–1959: Ernest Janetzki
- 1959–1972: John Corfe
- 1972–1973: Thomas Meehan
- 1973–1985: Ian McIntyre
- 1985–2008: Peter Taylor (mayor from 1993)

Peter Taylor was Jondaryan's final mayor, serving from 1985 until 2008. At the time of his first election he was the youngest Shire Chairman in Queensland. On 15 March 2008 he became the first mayor of the new Toowoomba Regional Council with 71.19% of the vote. Taylor was an executive member (Director) of the Local Government Association of Queensland (LGAQ) representing the Darling Downs, and was also director of the Board of LG Super, a statewide superannuation fund for all local government employees.
