= Shire of Drayton =

Local government area of Queensland, Australia

Coordinates: 27.597°S 151.894°E

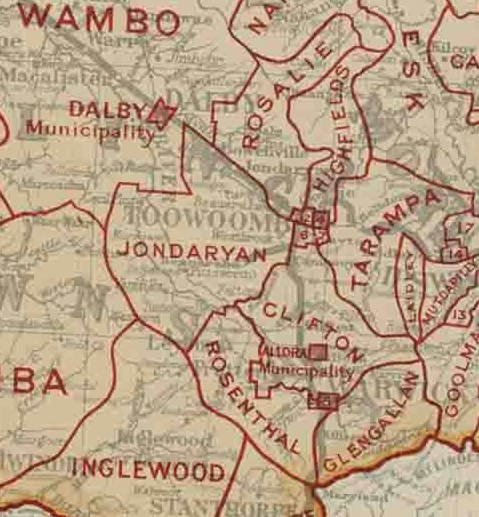
Map of Drayton Shire and adjacent local government areas, March 1902. Legend: Toowoomba Municipality (4), Drayton Shire (6), Middle Ridge Division (7), Gowrie Division (12)

The Shire of Drayton was a local government area in the Darling Downs region of Queensland, Australia, west of Toowoomba. It existed between 1887 and 1949.

== History ==
The Divisional Boards Act 1879 created local government areas across Queensland; one of these was the Gowrie Division which came into existence on 11 November 1879 with a population of 2898. On 20 August 1887, a part of the Gowrie Division was separated to form the Shire of Drayton.

On 23 February 1917, the Shire of Middle Ridge was abolished, split between the Shire of Drayton and the City of Toowoomba.

On 19 March 1949, the Shire of Drayton was abolished on 19 March 1949, split between City of Toowoomba and the Shires of Cambooya, Gatton and Jondaryan.

== Chairmen ==
- 1927: J. Platz
