= Robert Sparkes =

Australian politician

Sir Robert Lyndley Sparkes (31 May 1929 – 6 August 2006) was President of the Queensland National Party from 1970 to 1990 and the mayor of the Shire of Wambo for over 30 years.

Sparkes was born in Dalby, Queensland, the son of Sir Jim Sparkes.

Most of his term was served during the period of the Bjelke-Petersen-led National Party state government. Mid-term he survived the opposition of the premier, who was famous for getting his own way, and who said of him: "We have got to get rid of him. He is a dictator".

He was knighted in the 1979 New Year's Honours for services to local government.
