= Town of Dalby =

Coordinates: 27°10′54″S 151°15′36″E

- Local government area
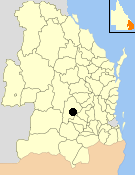
- Location within Queensland

- Country: Australia
- State: Queensland
- Region: Darling Downs
- Established: 1863
- Council seat: Dalby

Area
  - Total: 14.6 km^{2} (5.6 sq mi)

Population
  - Total: 9,778 (2006 census)
  - Density: 669.7/km^{2} (1,735/sq mi)
- Website: Town of Dalby

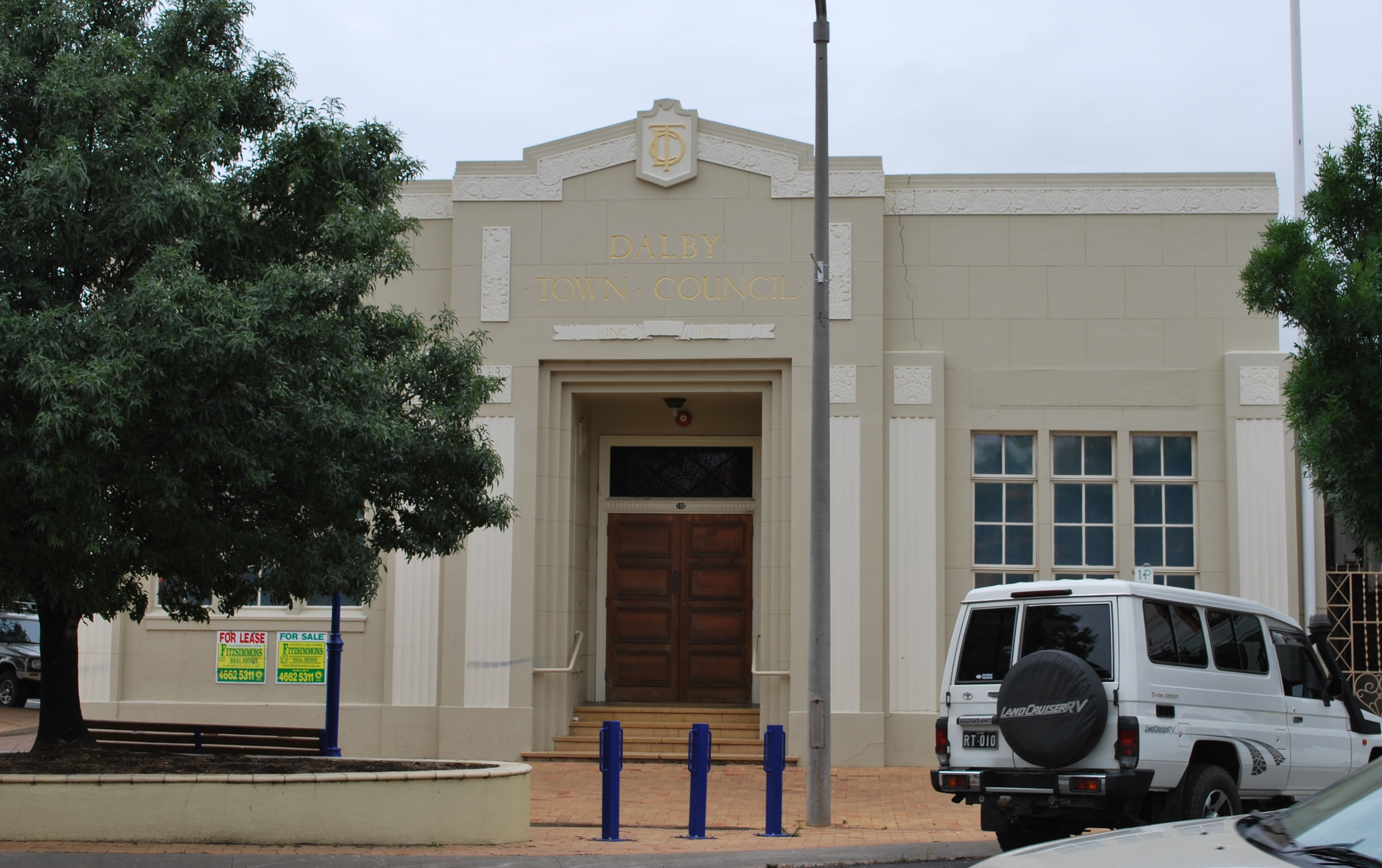
Dalby Town Hall, 2008

The Town of Dalby was a local government area of Queensland, Australia which managed the affairs of Dalby. It was located 85 kilometres (53 mi) north-west of Toowoomba. It was amalgamated into the Western Downs Region in 2008.

== History ==
Following a petition of residents, the Borough of Dalby was proclaimed a Municipality on 21 August 1863. The first elections for the Dalby Municipal Council held October 1863.

On 31 March, the Borough of Dalby became the Town of Dalby under the Local Authorities Act 1902.

The Shire of Wambo, also headquartered in Dalby and managing areas which surrounded the town, provided many functions in partnership with the Town, including libraries and area promotion.

On 15 March 2008, under the Local Government (Reform Implementation) Act 2007 passed by the Parliament of Queensland on 10 August 2007, the Town of Dalby merged with the Shires of Chinchilla, Murilla, Tara and Wambo and the southern part of Taroom to form the Western Downs Region.

== Population ==
Year	Population
1933	2,967
1947	4,385
1954	6,182
1961	7,600
1966	8,860
1971	8,879
1976	8,997
1981	8,784
1986	9,316
1991	9,385
1996	9,481
2001	9,693
2006	9,778

== Mayors ==
Mayor	Term	Notes
Frederick Roche	1863	
John Healy	1864	
Richard Sexton	1865	
Joseph Milstead	1866	
Patrick Hallinan	1866	
W. R. Twine	1867	
Frederick Roche	1868	
Richard Sexton	1869	
G. B. Molle	1870–1873	
J. S. Jessop	1873	
Patrick Landy	1874	
E. Campbell	1875	
Patrick Landy	1876–1879	
James Skelton	1880–1883	
William Wood	1883–1884	
William Wood	1887–1888	
John McQueen	1897	
Edward Ryan	1898	
William Fishbourne	1899	
H. McPherson	1906	
Victor Radcliffe Edward Drury	1910	
Peter Garrow	1926	
Victor Radcliffe Edward Drury	1927	
W. J. Vowels	3 times	
Thomas Jack	1930–1952	
Charles Drew	1962–1965	
H. S. Williams	1971	
Richard William Aland	1974–1982	
Margaret Wuth	1982–1988	
Warwick Geisel	1988–2008	

== Election results ==
=== 1933 ===
1933 Queensland local elections: Dalby
Party	Candidate	Votes	%	±%
Independent	John Joheph Walsh (elected)	1,156		
Independent	William John Vowles (elected)	1,077		
Independent	Daniel Wilke (elected)	978		
Independent	Peter Garrow (elected)	964		
Independent	Henry Edwin Coles (elected)	917		
Independent	Edwin Stuart Cootes (elected)	850		
Independent	Ernest James Starling (elected)	825		
Independent	Edward Henry Geisel (elected)	743		
Independent	James Johnston	710		
Independent	Richard Charles Drew	676		
Independent	Adolphus Allan Baker	605		
Independent	William Evans Ewing	594		
