= Shire of Cambooya =

Coordinates: 27°47′17″S 151°54′16″E

- Local government area
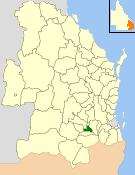
- Location within Queensland

- Country: Australia
- State: Queensland
- Region: Darling Downs
- Established: 1914
- Council seat: Greenmount

Area
  - Total: 638.5 km^{2} (246.5 sq mi)

Population
  - Total: 5,652 (2006 census)
  - Density: 8.8520/km^{2} (22.927/sq mi)
- Website: Shire of Cambooya
LGAs around Shire of Cambooya
Jondaryan	Toowoomba	Gatton
Pittsworth	Shire of Cambooya	Gatton
Clifton	Clifton	Gatton

The Shire of Cambooya was a local government area in the Darling Downs region of Queensland, Australia, immediately south of the regional city of Toowoomba. The shire, administered from the town of Greenmount, covered an area of 638.5 square kilometres (246.5 sq mi), and existed as a local government entity from 1914 until 2008, when it amalgamated with several other councils in the Toowoomba area to form the Toowoomba Region.

Its main pursuits included dairying and beef cattle, pig production, horse spelling and breeding, grain growing and vegetable production. The northern section, containing rural-residential suburbs such as Vale View and Hodgson Vale, are commuter districts within 12 kilometres (7 mi) of Toowoomba's urban core.

== History ==
The Shire of Cambooya was created by severance from the Shire of Clifton. It absorbed part of the Tarampa Shire in 1915, and part of Drayton in 1949.

Cambooya had four divisions electing two councillors each, with a separately elected mayor.

On 15 March 2008, under the Local Government (Reform Implementation) Act 2007 passed by the Parliament of Queensland on 10 August 2007, the Shire of Cambooya merged with the City of Toowoomba and the Shires of Clifton, Crows Nest, Jondaryan, Millmerran, Pittsworth and Shire of Rosalie to form the Toowoomba Region.

== Towns and localities ==
The Shire of Cambooya includes the following settlements:

- Cambooya
- East Greenmount
- Finnie^{1}
- Greenmount
- Hodgson Vale^{1}
- Mount Rascal^{1}
- Nobby^{2}
- Top Camp^{1}
- Vale View^{1}
- Westbrook
- Wyreema^{3}

^{1} - split with the former City of Toowoomba
^{2} - split with the former Shire of Clifton
^{3} - split with the former Shire of Jondaryan

== Population ==
Year	Population
1933	2,047
1947	1,780 #
1954	1,848
1961	1,732
1966	1,617
1971	1,558
1976	1,676
1981	1,894
1986	2,477
1991	2,860
1996	4,079
2001	4,856
2006	5,652

# The estimated 1947 population of the post-1949 area was 1,959.

== Chairmen and mayors ==
The leaders of the Cambooya Shire Council were:

=== Chairmen ===
- 1914—1916: Arthur Hoey Davis, better known as the author Steele Rudd
- 1916: James Purcell
- 1916—1918: Edward Fitzgerald
- 1918—1919: Timothy O'Rourke
- 1919—1920: William Purcell
- 1920—1921: Malcolm Brodie
- 1921—1923: James Lemon
- 1924—1939: Edward Fitzgerald
- 1939—1943: Samuel John Gilmour
- 1943—1949: William Henry Lipp
- 1949—1966: Leslie Ashby Free
- 1966—1973: George Gordon Savage
- 1973—1976: George Hannaford
- 1976—1982: George Gordon Savage
- 1982—1985: William Archibald Woods
- 1985—1993: Thomas Stratford Newman

=== Mayors ===
- 1993–2000: Robert Leslie Free
- 2000–2004: John Gordon Savage
- 2004–2008: Carol Estelle Taylor
