= Shire of Wambo =

Coordinates: 27°11′00″S 151°15′43″E

- Local government area
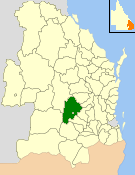
- Location within Queensland

- Country: Australia
- State: Queensland
- Region: Darling Downs
- Established: 1879
- Council seat: Dalby

Area
  - Total: 5,709.7 km^{2} (2,204.5 sq mi)

Population
  - Total: 5,229 (2006 census)
  - Density: 0.91581/km^{2} (2.37194/sq mi)
- Website: Shire of Wambo
LGAs around Shire of Wambo
Chinchilla	Chinchilla	Kingaroy
Chinchilla	Shire of Wambo	Nanango, Rosalie
Tara	Millmerran	Jondaryan

The Shire of Wambo was a local government area in the Darling Downs region of Queensland, Australia. The shire surrounded but did not include the town of Dalby – which had its own municipal government. It covered an area of 5,709.7 square kilometres (2,204.5 sq mi), and existed as a local government entity from 1879 until 2008, when it amalgamated with the Town of Dalby and the Shires of Chinchilla, Murilla and Tara and the southern part of Taroom to form the Western Downs Region.

== History ==
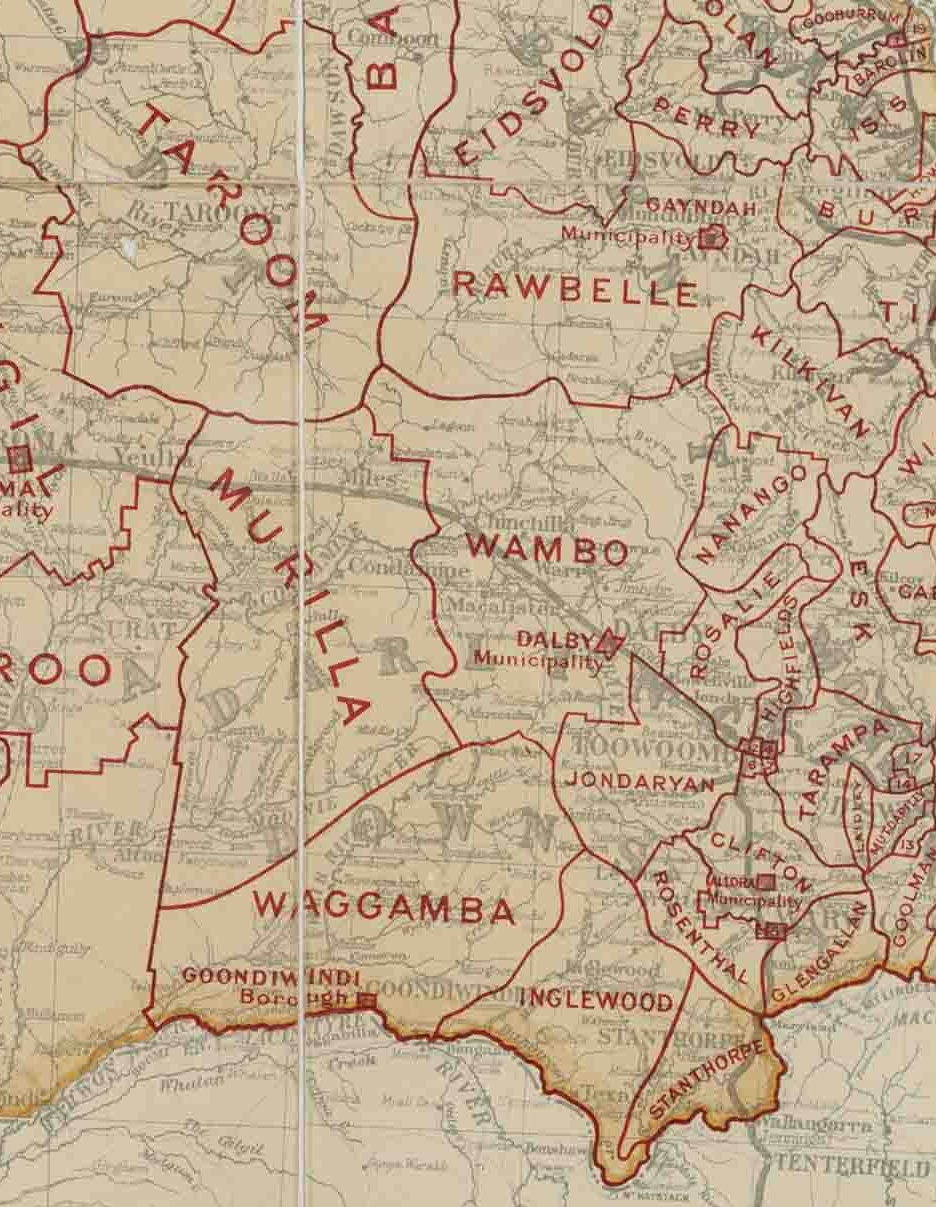
Map of Wambo Division and adjacent local government areas, March 1902

Wambo Division was created on 11 November 1879 as one of 74 divisions around Queensland under the Divisional Boards Act 1879 with a population of 1018.

On 23 February 1882, there was a realignment of boundaries between Wambo Division and Barambah Division, involving subdivision 3 of Wambo Division and subdivisions 1 and 2 of Barambah Division.

With the passage of the Local Authorities Act 1902, Wambo Division became the Shire of Wambo on 31 March 1903.

On 15 March 2008, under the Local Government (Reform Implementation) Act 2007 passed by the Parliament of Queensland on 10 August 2007, the Shire of Wambo merged with the Town of Dalby and the Shires of Chinchilla, Murilla and Tara and Division 2 of the Shire of Taroom (the Wandoan area) to form the Western Downs Region.

== Towns and localities ==
The Shire of Wambo included the following settlements:

Towns:

- Bell
- Jandowae
- Jimbour
- Kaimkillenbun
- Warra

Localities:

- Cooranga
- Ducklo
- Irvingdale
- Jinghi
- Kogan
- Kumbarilla
- Macalister
- Moola
- Mowbullan
- Nandi
- Pirrinuan
- Rangemore
- Ranges Bridge
- St. Ruth
- Tuckerang

== Chairmen ==
- 1927: Richard Henry Francis Best Jr
- Robert Sparkes

== Population ==
Year	Population
1921	4,908
1933	5,208
1947	6,046
1954	6,976
1961	6,893
1966	6,452
1971	5,659
1976	5,423
1981	5,511
1986	5,497
1991	5,184
1996	5,205
2001	5,102
2006	5,229
