= Shire of Millmerran =

Coordinates: 27°52′35″S 151°15′40″E

- Local government area
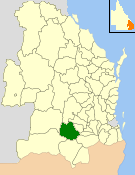
- Location within Queensland

- Country: Australia
- State: Queensland
- Region: Darling Downs
- Established: 1913
- Council seat: Millmerran

Area
  - Total: 4,520.8 km^{2} (1,745.5 sq mi)

Population
  - Total: 3,078 (2006 census)
  - Density: 0.68085/km^{2} (1.76340/sq mi)
- Website: Shire of Millmerran
LGAs around Shire of Millmerran
Tara	Wambo	Jondaryan
Tara	Shire of Millmerran	Clifton
Waggamba	Inglewood	Warwick

The Shire of Millmerran was a local government area in the Darling Downs region of Queensland, Australia, about 80 kilometres (50 mi) southwest of the regional city of Toowoomba. The shire covered an area of 4,520.8 square kilometres (1,745.5 sq mi), and existed as a local government entity from 1913 until 2008, when it amalgamated with several other councils in the Toowoomba area to become the Toowoomba Region.

The shire was located in the catchment of the Condamine and Macintyre Rivers and as well as traditional sheep and cattle grazing, industry in the shire included cotton, timber, piggeries and coal mining. The main crops grown are barley, wheat, sorghum and small grains.

== History ==
The Shire of Millmerran came into existence on 24 April 1913 after its residents and those of the Pittsworth area to the northeast voted to split away from the Shire of Jondaryan.

On 15 March 2008, under the Local Government (Reform Implementation) Act 2007 passed by the Parliament of Queensland on 10 August 2007, the Shire of Millmerran merged with the City of Toowoomba and the Shires of Cambooya, Clifton, Crows Nest, Jondaryan, Pittsworth and Shire of Rosalie to form the Toowoomba Region.

== Towns and localities ==
The Shire of Millmerran includes the following settlements:

- Millmerran
- Bringalily
- Cecil Plains
- Domville
- Lavelle
- Lemontree
- Pampas
- Tummaville
- Turallin
- Yandilla

== Population ==
Year	Population
1933	2,335
1947	3,012
1954	3,473
1961	3,423
1966	3,512
1971	3,435
1976	3,309
1981	3,047
1986	3,115
1991	3,014
1996	2,830
2001	3,935
2006	3,078

== Chairmen and mayors ==
- 1925: J. McKenzie
- 1927: J. McKenzie
- 2004—2008: Paul Antonio
