= Shire of Pittsworth =

Coordinates: 27°43′03.7″S 151°37′59.8″E

- Local government area
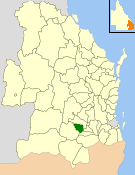
- Location within Queensland

- Country: Australia
- State: Queensland
- Region: Darling Downs
- Established: 1913
- Council seat: Pittsworth

Area
  - Total: 1,089.5 km^{2} (420.7 sq mi)

Population
  - Total: 4,688 (2006 census)
  - Density: 4.3029/km^{2} (11.1444/sq mi)
- Website: Shire of Pittsworth
LGAs around Shire of Pittsworth
Jondaryan	Jondaryan	Jondaryan
Millmerran	Shire of Pittsworth	Jondaryan
Millmerran	Clifton	Cambooya

The Shire of Pittsworth was a local government area in the Darling Downs region of Queensland, Australia, about 40 kilometres (25 mi) southwest of the regional city of Toowoomba. The shire covered an area of 1,089.5 square kilometres (420.7 sq mi), and existed as a local government entity from 1913 until 2008, when it amalgamated with several other councils in the Toowoomba area to form the Toowoomba Region.

== History ==
The Shire of Pittsworth came into existence on 24 April 1913 after its residents voted to split away from the Shire of Jondaryan. It held its first meeting on 9 July 1913 at which W.P. Copp was elected chairman by 5 votes to 4. A new hall and council office was built for £766 in 1914, but in 1956 the council relocated to the new Civic Centre in Yandilla Street, Pittsworth, consisting of a Town Hall and Shire Chambers. Pittsworth was an undivided council and elected a mayor and six councillors.

On 15 March 2008, under the Local Government (Reform Implementation) Act 2007 passed by the Parliament of Queensland on 10 August 2007, the Shire of Pittsworth merged with the City of Toowoomba and the Shires of Cambooya, Clifton, Crows Nest, Jondaryan, Millmerran and Shire of Rosalie to form the Toowoomba Region.

== Towns and localities ==
The Shire of Pittsworth includes the following settlements:

- Pittsworth
- Biddeston
- Bongeen
- Branchview
- Brookstead
- Broxburn
- Felton
- Irongate
- Kincora
- Linthorpe
- Mount Tyson
- Nangwee
- North Branch
- Norwin
- Rossvale
- Scrubby Mountain
- Southbrook
- Springside
- St Helens
- Stoneleigh
- Yarranlea

== Population ==
Year	Population
1933	3,544
1947	3,599
1954	3,731
1961	3,821
1966	3,713
1971	3,795
1976	3,714
1981	3,605
1986	3,880
1991	4,035
1996	4,264
2001	4,445
2006	4,688

== Chairmen and Mayors ==
The leaders of the shire are listed below.

=== Chairmen ===
- 1913–15: William Perham Copp
- 1915–17: Jacob Bickerton
- 1917–18: William Sullivan
- 1918–21: Arthur Carl Krieg
- 1921–23: Jacob Bickerton
- 1923: Jonas Holmes
- 1923–36: Arthur Carl Krieg
- 1936–39: William Lee-Archer
- 1939–46: Arthur Carl Krieg
- 1946–49: William Lee-Archer
- 1949–57: Sir Alan Roy Fletcher
- 1957–67: Leslie Joppich
- 1967–85: Ross Thomas Stirling
- 1985–94: Lawrence Dudley Stallman

=== Mayors ===
- 1994–98: W J Drummond
- 1998–2008: Ros S Scotney
