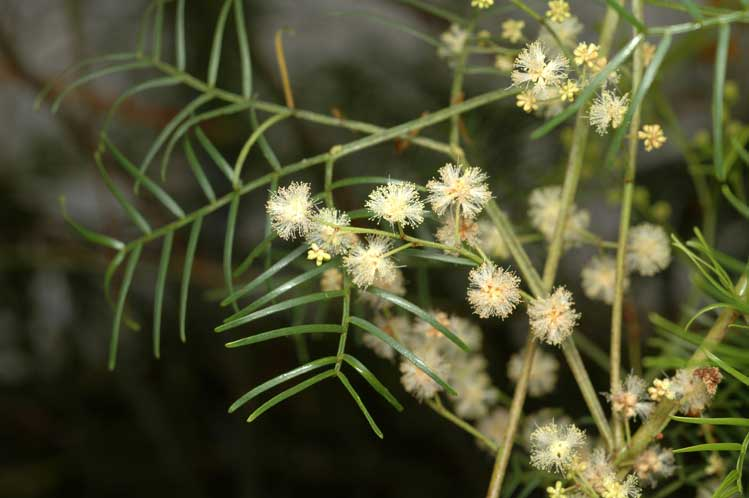
- In the Australian National Botanic Gardens

Scientific classification
- Kingdom: Plantae
- Clade: Tracheophytes
- Clade: Angiosperms
- Clade: Eudicots
- Clade: Rosids
- Order: Fabales
- Family: Fabaceae
- Subfamily: Caesalpinioideae
- Clade: Mimosoid clade
- Genus: Acacia
- Species: A. muelleriana

Binomial name
- Acacia muelleriana Maiden & R.T.Baker
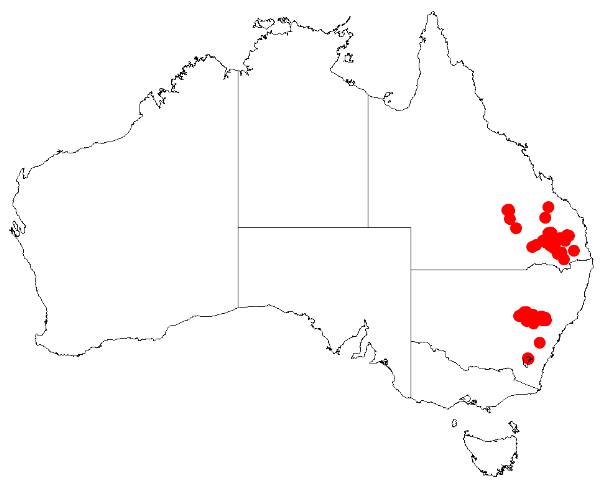
- Occurrence data from Australasian Virtual Herbarium

Synonyms
- Racosperma muellerianum Pedley

= Acacia muelleriana =

Species of legume

Acacia muelleriana , commonly known as Mueller's wattle, is a species of flowering plant in the family Fabaceae, and is endemic to eastern Australia. It is a bushy, many-stemmed shrub or tree with smooth bark, terete branchlets angled towards the outer end, dark green bipinnate leaves, spherical heads of cream-coloured flowers arranged in panicles, and straight to curved and more or less flat pods constricted between the seeds.

== Description ==
Acacia muelleriana is a bushy, many-stemmed shrub or tree that typically grows to a height of 1.5–8 m (4 ft 11 in – 26 ft 3 in) and has smooth grey, reddish or yellowish brown bark and terete, ridged, glabrous branchlets. Its leaves are bipinnate, more or less leathery, dark green and glabrous, with usually one or two pairs of pinnae 20–60 mm (0.79–2.36 in) long on a petiole mostly 10–30 mm (0.39–1.18 in) long. Each pair of pinnae has four to ten pairs of widely-spaced, narrowly oblong to linear pinnules 8–30 mm (0.31–1.18 in) long, 0.5–1.5 mm (0.020–0.059 in) wide and slightly narrowed at the base, with a more or less central vein. The flowers are arranged in spherical heads in panicles at the end of branchlets on peduncles 1–8 mm (0.039–0.315 in) long, each head 3–5 mm (0.12–0.20 in) in diameter with 5 to 14 cream-coloured flowers. Flowering mostly occurs from August to December, and the pods are straight to curved, more or less flat, 25–130 mm (0.98–5.12 in) long, 5.5–7 mm (0.22–0.28 in) wide, thinly leathery, glabrous and slightly to deeply constricted between the seeds.

== Taxonomy ==
Acacia muelleriana was first formally described in 1893 by Joseph Maiden and Richard Baker in the Proceedings of the Linnean Society of New South Wales from a specimen found at the "foot of ranges forming the southern watershed of the western branches of the Hunter River, New South Wales". The specific epithet (muelleriana) honours Ferdinand von Mueller.

== Distribution and habitat ==
Mueller's wattle occurs in eastern Queensland from north of Carnarvon and south to the Bunya Mountains, Kingaroy and the Darling Downs, as well as on the western slope of New South Wales as far west as Dubbo, east to the Goulburn River and south to Rylstone. It grows in shallow, rocky soild in open woodland or scrub on sandstone, conglomerate or basalt.

== See also ==
- List of Acacia species
