= Shire of Chinchilla =

Coordinates: 26°44′33.5″S 150°37′24″E

- Local government area
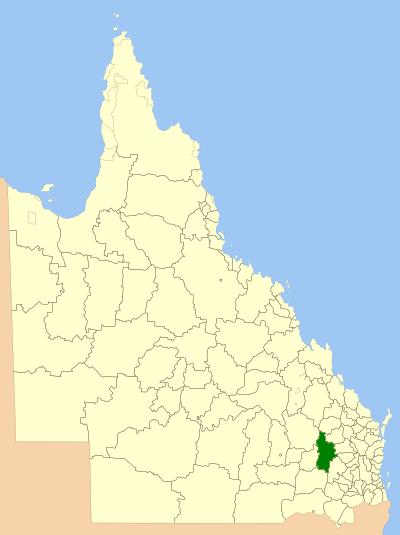
- Location within Queensland

- Country: Australia
- State: Queensland
- Region: Darling Downs
- Established: 1912
- Abolished: 2008
- Council seat: Chinchilla

Area
  - Total: 8,700.3 km^{2} (3,359.2 sq mi)

Population
  - Total: 5,942 (2006 census)
  - Density: 0.68296/km^{2} (1.76887/sq mi)
- Postcode: 4413
- Website: Shire of Chinchilla
LGAs around Shire of Chinchilla
Taroom	Eidsvold	Mundubbera
Murilla	Shire of Chinchilla	Wondai, Kingaroy
Tara	Tara	Wambo

The Shire of Chinchilla was a local government area in the Darling Downs region of Queensland, Australia. The shire, administered from the town of Chinchilla, covered an area of 8,700.3 square kilometres (3,359.2 sq mi), and existed as a local government entity from 1912 until 2008, when it amalgamated with the Town of Dalby and the Shires of Murilla, Tara and Wambo and the southern part of Taroom to form the Western Downs Region.

The economy of the area is largely reliant on primary production. Agriculture is the mainstay of the community, with beef and pork production, wool growing, and horticulture traditionally underwriting the local economy.

== History ==
The Shire of Chinchilla was established on 12 January 1912 by severance from the Shire of Wambo.

On 15 March 2008, under the Local Government (Reform Implementation) Act 2007 passed by the Parliament of Queensland on 10 August 2007, the Shire of Chinchilla merged with the Town of Dalby and the Shires of Murilla, Tara and Wambo and the southern part of Taroom to form the Western Downs Region.

== Towns and localities ==
The Shire of Chinchilla included the following settlements:

Towns:

- Chinchilla
- Brigalow
- Kogan

Localities:

- Barakula
- Boonarga
- Brigalow
- Burncluith
- Burra Burri
- Canaga
- Goombi
- Hopeland
- Pelican
- Rywung
- Wychie

== Chairmen and Mayors ==
Office Holder	Date From	Date To	Title	Notes
Leonard Louis Atkins	13 March 1912	23 January 1913	Chairman	
William C. Fraser	6 March 1913	3 March 1914	Chairman	
Thomas Evans	3 March 1914	25 February 1916	Chairman	
John Alexander Wilkinson	1916	1917	Chairman	
George Wilbert Wood	1917	1919	Chairman	
Frederick Joseph Glasson	1919	1933	Chairman	
James Edward Mackie	1933	1939	Chairman	Elected with 568 votes, over FJ Glasson with 444
Thomas William Reid	1939	1948	Chairman	Resigned in 1948
George L Castle	1948	1949	Chairman	
John Dorney	1949	1968	Chairman	Died while in office on 17 September 1968
Harvey Fuller	1968	April 1981	Chairman	Resigned from office.
Eric Stewart	1981	1985	Chairman	Did not seek reelection
Ivan Middleton	1985	2000	Chairman later Mayor	
Bill McCutcheon	2000	2008	Mayor	

== Population ==
Year	Population
1921	3,103
1933	3,936
1947	5,203
1954	6,021
1961	6,063
1966	6,093
1971	5,524
1976	5,319
1981	5,387
1986	5,534
1991	5,406
1996	5,590
2001	5,609
2006	5,942
