= City of Toowoomba =

- Local government area
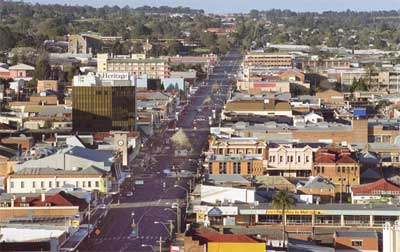
- City CBD Looking South

- Country: Australia
- State: Queensland
- Region: Darling Downs, South East Queensland
- Established: 1860
- Council seat: Toowoomba

Area
  - Total: 116.5 km^{2} (45.0 sq mi)

Population
  - Total: 119,714
  - Density: 1,027.6/km^{2} (2,661.4/sq mi)
- Website: City of Toowoomba
LGAs around City of Toowoomba
Rosalie	Crows Nest	Gatton
Jondaryan	City of Toowoomba	Gatton
Jondaryan	Cambooya	Gatton

The City of Toowoomba was a local government area on the border of Darling Downs and South East Queensland regions of Queensland, Australia, encompassing the centre and inner suburbs of the regional city of Toowoomba. The City covered an area of 116.5 square kilometres (45.0 sq mi), and existed as a local government entity in various forms from 1860 until 2008, when it amalgamated with several other councils in the surrounding area to form the Toowoomba Region.

== History ==
The Borough of Toowoomba was proclaimed on 19 November 1860 under the Municipalities Act 1858, a piece of New South Wales legislation inherited by Queensland when it became a separate colony in 1859. William Henry Groom, sometimes described as the "father of Toowoomba", was elected its first mayor. It achieved a measure of autonomy in 1878 with the enactment of the Local Government Act. With the passage of the Local Authorities Act 1902, Toowoomba Municipality became the Town of Toowoomba on 31 March 1903. On 29 October 1904, Toowoomba was proclaimed the City of Toowoomba.

Toowoomba absorbed parts of the Shire of Middle Ridge and Town of Newtown on 23 February 1917.

On 19 March 1949, following a major reorganisation of local government in South East Queensland, Toowoomba grew its area to include parts of the Shires of Highfields and Drayton.

In 2006 the Mayor Dianne Thorley proposed a controversial plan to recycle sewage into Cooby Dam which is used for drinking water. The federal government agreed to provide partial funding subject to a number of conditions including a requirement to hold a referendum on the issue. On 29 July 2006, Toowoomba voted against the recycled sewage project with the 'No' vote winning by 62% to 38%.

On 15 March 2008, under the Local Government (Reform Implementation) Act 2007 passed by the Parliament of Queensland on 10 August 2007, the City of Toowoomba merged with the Shires of Cambooya, Clifton, Crows Nest, Jondaryan, Millmerran, Pittsworth and Shire of Rosalie to form the Toowoomba Region. The former mayor of the Shire of Jondaryan won the mayoralty of the new council.

== Suburbs ==
The City of Toowoomba included the following settlements:

- Blue Mountain Heights^{1}
- Centenary Heights
- Cotswold Hills^{2}
- Cranley
- Darling Heights
- Drayton
- East Toowoomba
- Glenvale^{2}
- Harlaxton
- Harristown
- Highfields^{1}
- Kearneys Spring
- Middle Ridge
- Mount Kynoch
- Mount Lofty
- Newtown
- North Toowoomba
- Prince Henry Heights
- Rangeville
- Redwood
- Rockville
- South Toowoomba
- Toowoomba City
- Torrington^{2}
- Wilsonton
- Wilsonton Heights

^{1} - split with the former Shire of Crows Nest
^{2} - split with the former Shire of Jondaryan

== Population ==
Year	Population
1954	43,149
1961	50,134
1966	55,799
1971	59,524
1976	66,436
1981	66,698
1986	73,390
1991	81,043
1996	83,633
2001	86,642
2006	90,466
2011	108,933
2016	134,037

== Mayors ==
- List of mayors of Toowoomba

== Election results ==
=== 1933 ===
1933 Queensland local elections: Toowoomba
Party	Candidate	Votes	%	±%
Independent	John Robinson	6,538		
Independent	Joseph Flatz	6,430		
Independent	Job Eagles Stone	5,748		
Independent	Con. Bowdler	5,371		
Independent	Frank B. Colnmon	5,197		
Independent	Richard C. Cavanough	5,106		
Independent	Atherton A. Griffiths	5,021		
Independent	Henry G. Webb	4,819		
Independent	Charles G. Blair	4,654		
Labor	Reginald Turnbull	4,625		
Independent	August T. Parrot	4,468		
Independent	Edward W. Cleary	4,152		
Independent	Patrick J. Hickey	3,663		
Labor	William James Cronin	3,566		
Labor	James J. Strohfeld	3,280		
Labor	John T. Buchanan	2,809		
Labor	David J. Mohr	2,668		
Labor	Henry J. Goldsworthy	2,554		
Labor	Victor T. Cleary	1,965		
Independent	Joseph Thomson	1,797		
Independent	Albert T. Sussmilch	1,612		
Labor	Jessie Schmidt	1,569		
Communist	William A. Franklin	1,250	1.41	
Total formal votes		88,862	99.09	
Informal votes		820	0.91	
Party total votes
Independent		64,576	72.67	
Labor		23,036	25.92	
Communist		1,250	1.41	
