= Shire of Murilla =

Coordinates: 26°39′27.25″S 150°11′03.54″E

- Local government area
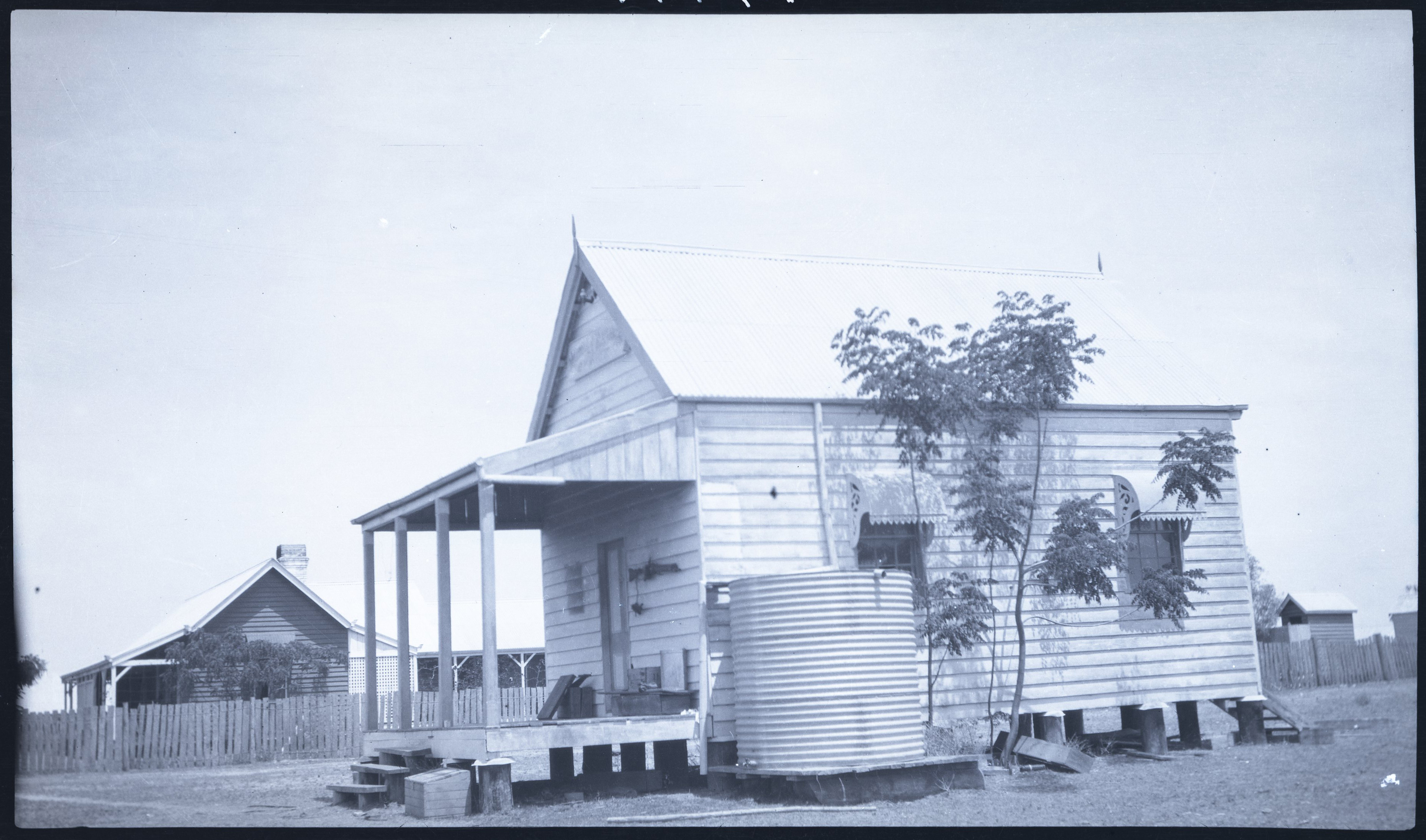
- Murilla Shire Hall, circa 1930

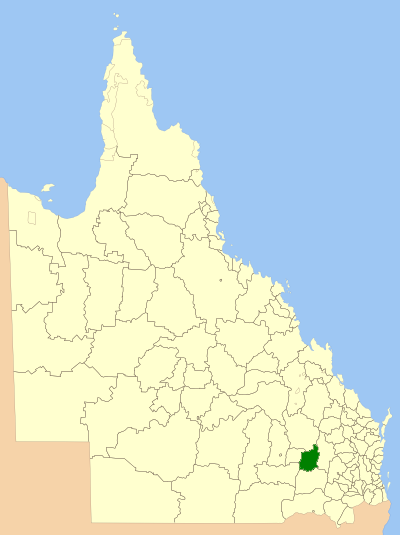
- Location within Queensland
- Country: Australia
- State: Queensland
- Region: Darling Downs
- Established: 1879
- Council seat: Miles

Area
  - Total: 6,075.8 km^{2} (2,345.9 sq mi)

Population
  - Total: 2,687 (2006 census)
  - Density: 0.44225/km^{2} (1.14541/sq mi)
- Website: Shire of Murilla
LGAs around Shire of Murilla
Bendemere	Taroom	Chinchilla
Bendemere	Shire of Murilla	Chinchilla
Warroo	Tara	Tara

The Shire of Murilla was a local government area located in the Darling Downs region of Queensland, Australia. The shire, administered from the town of Miles, covered an area of 6,075.8 square kilometres (2,345.9 sq mi), and existed as a local government entity from 1879 until 2008, when it amalgamated with the Town of Dalby and the Shires of Chinchilla, Tara and Wambo and the southern part of Taroom to form the Western Downs Region.

== History ==
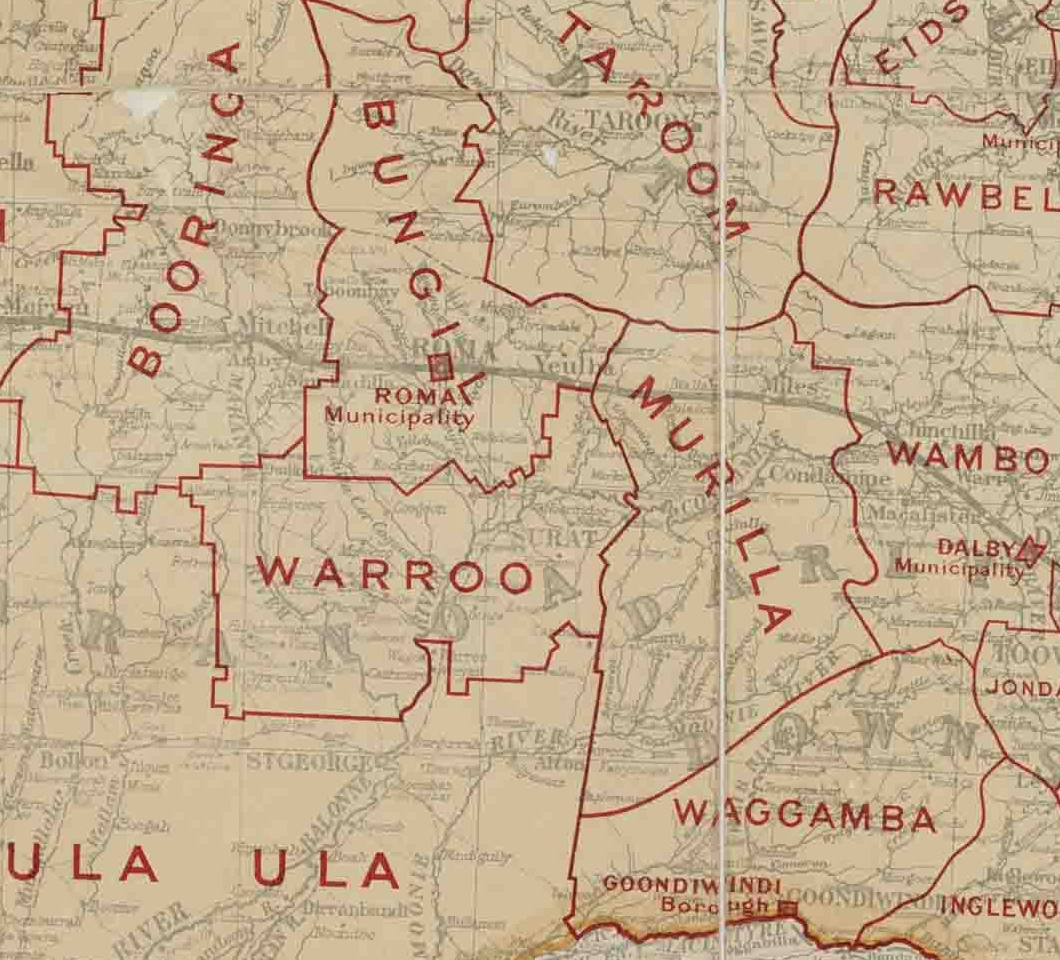
Map of Murilla Division and adjacent local government areas, March 1902

Murilla Division was created on 11 November 1879 as one of 74 divisions around Queensland under the Divisional Boards Act 1879 with a population of 761.

With the passage of the Local Authorities Act 1902, Murilla Division became the Shire of Murilla on 31 March 1903.

On 15 March 2008, under the Local Government (Reform Implementation) Act 2007 passed by the Parliament of Queensland on 10 August 2007, the Shire of Murilla merged with the Town of Dalby and the Shires of Chinchilla, Tara and Wambo and Division 2 of Shire of Taroom (the Wandoan area) to form the Western Downs Region.

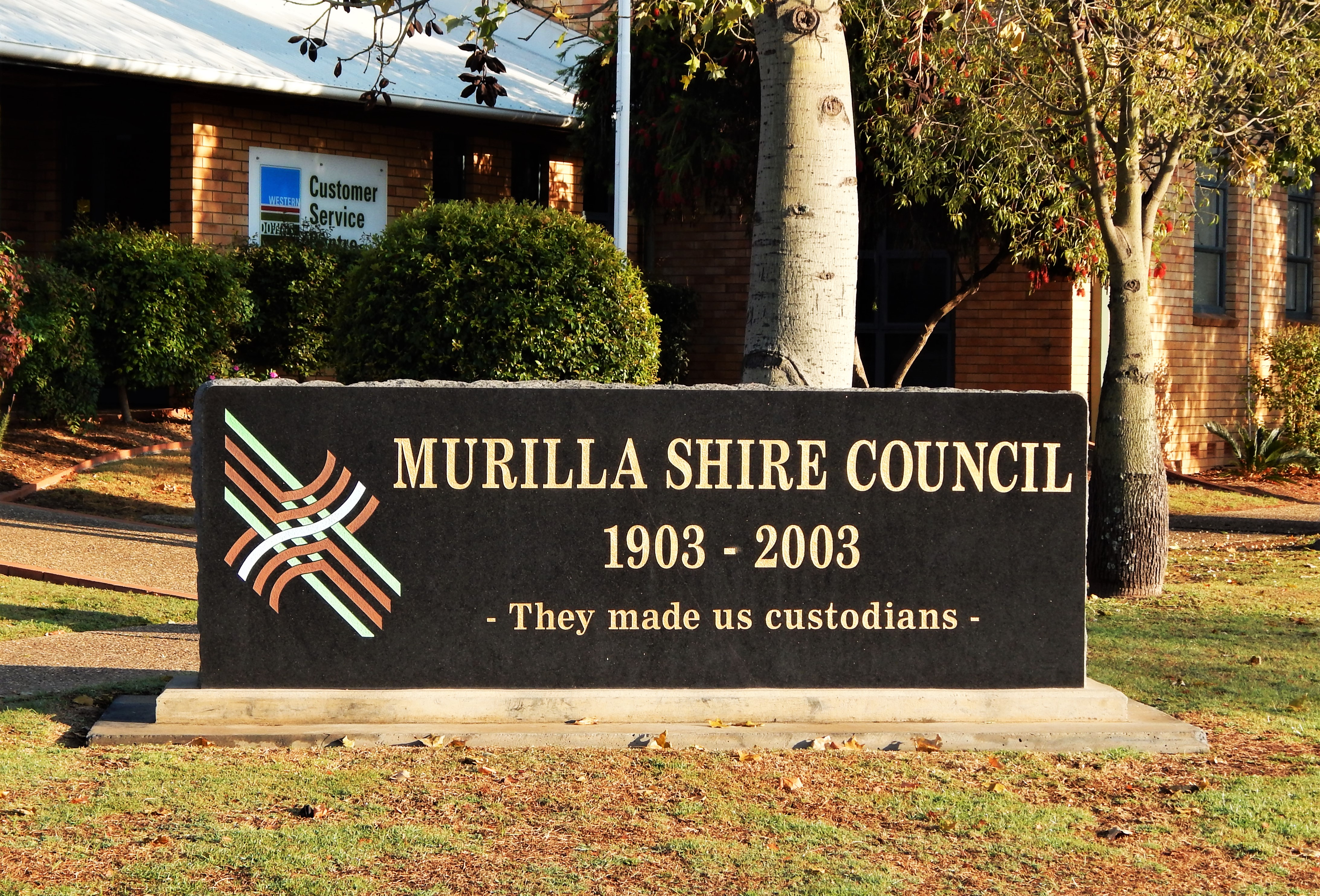
Monument erected in Miles for Murilla Shire's centenary in 2003

== Towns and localities ==
The Shire of Murilla included the following settlements:

Towns:

- Miles
- Condamine
- Drillham
- Dulacca

Localities:

- Barramornie
- Bogandilla
- Columboola
- Dalwogon
- Drillham South
- Glenaubyn
- Gurulmundi
- Hookswood
- Kowguran
- Myall Park
- Moraby
- Nangram
- Pine Hills
- Sunnyside
- Yulabilla

== Population ==
Year	Population
1933	2,217
1947	2,493
1954	3,090
1961	3,599
1966	3,494
1971	3,239
1976	3,137
1981	3,007
1986	3,212
1991	2,919
1996	2,775
2001	2,687
2006	2,740

== Chairmen ==
- 1894: Edward Ainsworth Gaden
- 1902: Henry Bourne
- 1927: George Mundell
