= Atkinson & Powell Building =

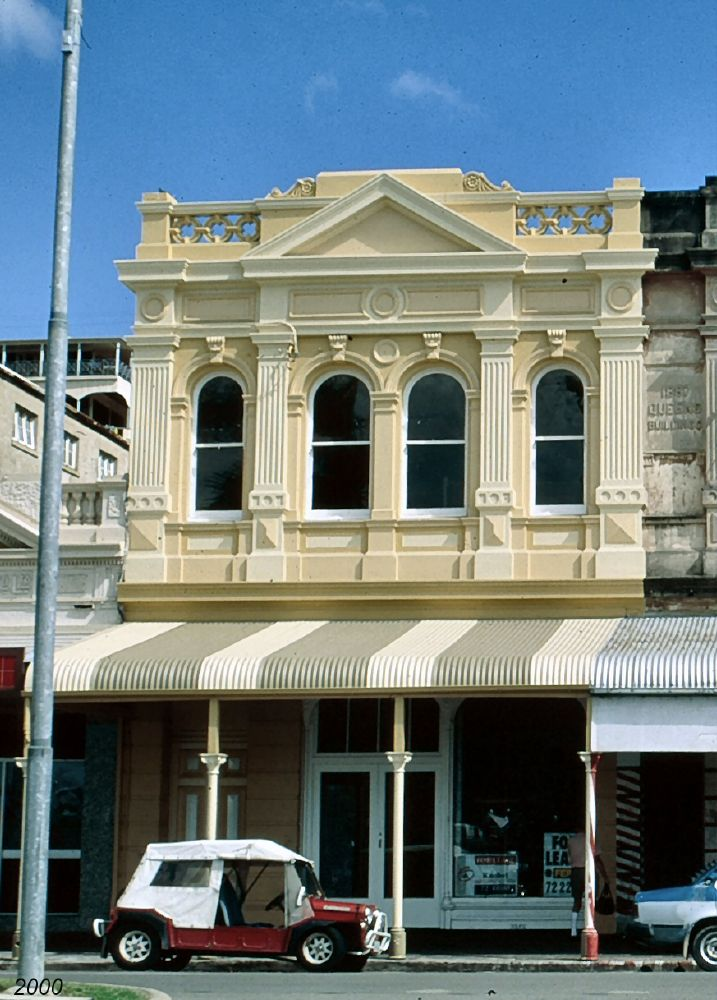
- Atkinson & Powell Building, 2000

- Location within Queensland Location within Australia
- 19.2574°S 146.8197°E
- Location: 181–183 Flinders Street, Townsville CBD, City of Townsville, Queensland, Australia

History
- Design period: 1870s–1890s (late 19th century)
- Built: 1887

Site notes
- Architect: Willoughby Powell
- Architectural style: Classicism

Queensland Heritage Register
- Official name: Atkinson & Powell Building (former), Matchbox Theatre
- Type: state heritage (built)
- Designated: 21 October 1992
- Reference no.: 600897
- Significant period: 1880s (fabric); 1887–1965 (historical commercial use)

Atkinson & Powell Building is a heritage-listed former pharmacy and now general commercial premises at 181–183 Flinders Street, Townsville CBD, City of Townsville, Queensland, Australia. It was designed by Willoughby Powell and built in 1887. It is also known as Matchbox Theatre. It was added to the Queensland Heritage Register on 21 October 1992.

== History ==
The former Atkinson & Powell Building was designed in 1886 by Willoughby Powell for chemists Atkinson & Powell, a firm in which the architect's brother was a partner.

Townsville was established in 1864 by partners John Melton Black and Robert Towns and the Port of Townsville was gazetted as a port of entry in 1865. It grew quickly as a supply centre and by 1873 the port was receiving international as well as coastal traffic. Improvements were carried out to port facilities to allow larger ships to anchor. By 1880 Townsville was the port for several major goldfields and had opened the first stage of the Great Northern railway line westwards through Charters Towers and beyond, consolidating its importance as a port and mercantile centre.

By the mid-1880s Townsville was enjoying a building boom owing to the growth of the town and the destruction by fire of a number of buildings in Flinders Street in the early 1880s. It was subsequently declared a first class area, where only building in stone, masonry or metal was permitted. This meant that timber buildings from the first stage of settlement were replaced with substantial masonry ones, an encouragement to do likewise even for those whose property had escaped fire damage.

In 1887 a mortgage on the site was taken out by Joseph Atkinson and Francis Powell to allow the construction of a substantial pharmacy building. It was designed by Willoughby Powell, the brother of Frank Powell, who was a dentist. The new premises had a large shop at the front and two smaller rooms behind, one of which was used as a surgery by Powell. The upper floor was a warehouse, used purely for storage, and was accessed by an outside stair and a small lift for raising goods. The ground floor originally had a central entrance flanked by windows, but in the 1890s, a side door and internal staircase were inserted. The curved frames of the original windows can still be seen.

Willoughby Powell was born and trained as an architect in England. In 1872 he emigrated to Australia with his brother and worked for Richard Gailey in Brisbane before joining the Queensland Works Department in 1874. After winning a design competition for the Toowoomba Grammar School he set up a practice there between 1875 and 1877. After travelling to England in 1878 he worked again for Gailey before moving to Maryborough to supervise his own work between 1882 and 1885. He then returned to Gailey in Brisbane until 1893 when the financial crash saw the bottom drop out of the building trade. His own design work seems to have largely been for churches, public buildings and large houses. The Atkinson and Powell building is his only work in North Queensland, one of very few shops known to have been designed by him. A drawing of the completed building was featured in the 1887 Christmas issue of the Townsville Herald.

Soon after the Atkinson and Powell building was constructed, Queens Building was erected adjoining it for Pio Armati by the well known Townsville firm of Tunbridge and Tunbridge. Their design complemented Atkinson and Powell's building, having several design features in common.

In 1893 Atkinson was declared insolvent and the building was acquired by the North Queensland Mortgage and Investment Company Limited who held the mortgage. The building was leased to a number of different businesses including a dentist, a chemist, and a watchmaker. In 1920 the building housed offices for the Australian Oriental Line, the Townsville Chamber of Commerce and a restaurant. The Vacuum Oil Co leased the ground floor between 1922 and 1932. The building is believed to have been later occupied by a newsagent on the ground floor and the upper storey was the headquarters of the Townsville Book Club, a private lending library. In 1965 the building was converted for use as the 1965 Stage Door Theatre. In 1979 they moved and the Performing Arts Department of the Townsville College of TAFE occupied the building.

== Description ==
The former Atkinson & Powell Building is located on the main commercial street of Townsville and is a two-storey, brick building closely matching in style, though differing in decoration, the building adjoining it.

The building is rendered on the street elevation and has classically influenced moulded decoration. The upper floor has four rounded headed windows with prominent voussoirs, separated by pilasters. Above this is an entablature and a balustraded parapet with a triangular pediment. This conceals a hipped roof clad with corrugated iron.

A bullnosed corrugated iron awning shades the shopfront. It is supported on cast iron columns linked by a cast iron frieze. The central and eastern bays of the original timber framed glazed shopfront survive. There is a separate entrance to the upper level accessed through a timber door on the western side.

== Heritage listing ==
The former Atkinson & Powell Building was listed on the Queensland Heritage Register on 21 October 1992 having satisfied the following criteria.

The place is important in demonstrating the evolution or pattern of Queensland's history.

The style and quality of the former Atkinson & Powell Building demonstrates the prosperity of Townsville in the 1880s and reflects the way in which North Queensland was developed by the establishment of key ports as commercial and administrative centres.

The place is important in demonstrating the principal characteristics of a particular class of cultural places.

The building is important as a good example of a substantial nineteenth century office building in North Queensland.

The place is important because of its aesthetic significance.

It is located on the major commercial street of Townsville where, by its design, form and materials, it is a substantial visual component of the built character of the city.

The place has a special association with the life or work of a particular person, group or organisation of importance in Queensland's history.

The building is associated with the life and work of architect Willoughby Powell and is believed to be his only commission in North Queensland.
