= Wesley Uniting Church, Toowoomba =

Wesley Uniting Church (former)
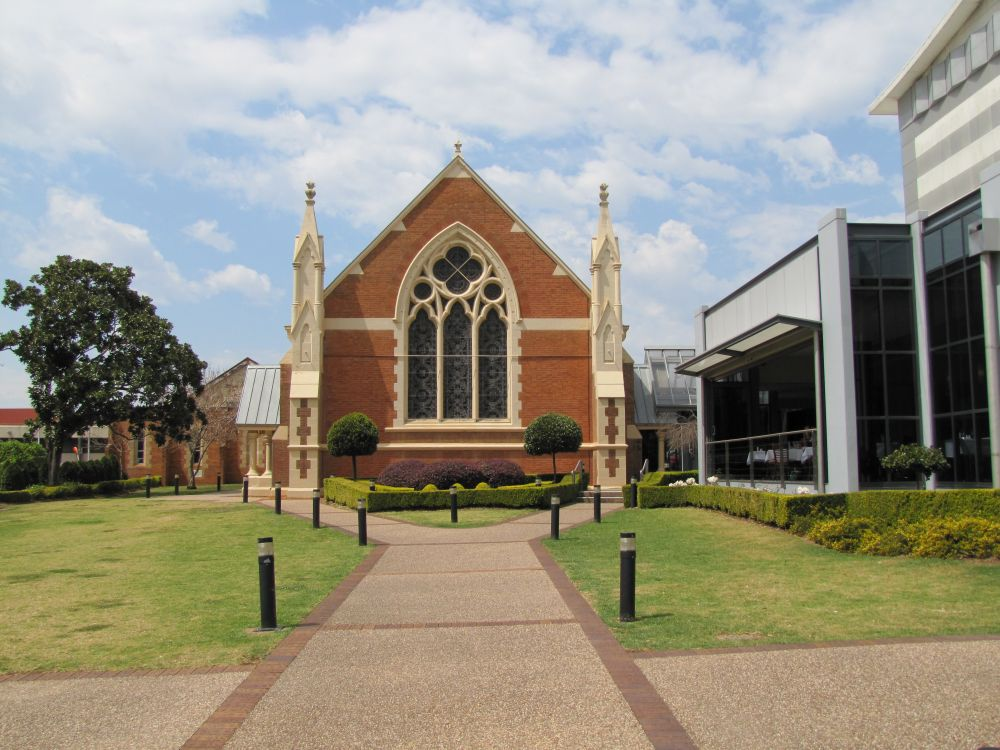
- The former Wesley Uniting Church, 2012
- Wesley Uniting Church (former)
- 27°33′46″S 151°57′21″E
- Address: 54 Neil Street, Toowoomba, Toowoomba Region, Queensland
- Country: Australia
- Previous denomination: Methodist (1877–1977); Uniting (1977–1998)

History
- Former name: Wesleyan Methodist Church
- Status: Hospitality venue (since 1998); Church (1887–1998)
- Founded: 14 July 1877
- Founder(s): Arthur Kennedy, Governor of Queensland
- Dedicated: 4 August 1878

Architecture
- Functional status: Preserved
- Architects: Willoughby Powell (1877); William Hodgen Jnr (1901)
- Architectural type: Church
- Style: Gothic Revival
- Years built: 1877–1924
- Construction cost: A£2,300
- Closed: 1998 (as a church)

Specifications
- Materials: Brick

Queensland Heritage Register
- Official name: Wesley Uniting Church, Wesleyan Methodist Church
- Type: State heritage (built, landscape)
- Designated: 10 May 1997
- Reference no.: 601695
- Significant period: 1870s (historical) ongoing (social)
- Significant components: Church, garden/grounds, views to, stained glass window/s, fencing

Wesley Uniting Church is a heritage-listed former Uniting church at 54 Neil Street, Toowoomba, Toowoomba Region, Queensland, Australia. It was designed by Willoughby Powell and built from 1877 to 1924. It is also known as Wesleyan Methodist Church. It was added to the Queensland Heritage Register on 10 May 1997.

Since 1998, the former church has been part of a hospitality complex.

== History ==
The former Wesley Uniting Church was constructed in 1877 to the design of Willoughby Powell. In 1901 extensions designed by William Hodgen Jnr were made to the church which completed the building's cruciform plan. The building was the second Wesleyan Methodist Church in Toowoomba and, later, the head church of the Methodist church of the Toowoomba circuit.

=== European settlement of the area ===
Settlement of what was to become the Toowoomba area commenced at Drayton, now a suburb of Toowoomba, in the early 1840s. Thomas Alford opened a general store in the area in 1843. In the same year, residents of Drayton petitioned the Governor to form a township. A survey of the town was prepared in 1849. In laying out Drayton, Government Surveyor JC Burnett was instructed to mark out "suburban allotments for Garden and Agricultural purposes". The ideal site for what was known as the "Drayton Swamp Agricultural Reserve", later to become Toowoomba, was an area approximately three to four miles northeast of Drayton where two swampy creeks joined to form the headwaters of Gowrie Creek. The Agricultural Reserve included 12 allotments bounded by the left bank of the west swamp, and the present Bridge, West and Stephen streets.

Six of the 12 "Swamp Allotments" were first offered at auction in November 1849, however some were not sold until 1853. By late 1857, the name "Toowoomba" had gradually taken over from "The Swamp", as the town continued to expand. At the time of its incorporation into a municipality in November 1860, Toowoomba had well outgrown Drayton.

According to Maurice French, Toowoomba expanded rapidly in the 1870s as a result of the Selection Act of 1868 after which provisions and services for the new selectors were required. Many public buildings were erected or updated and a railway station, the "most-imposing in Queensland" was constructed.

=== First Wesleyan Methodist Church ===
By the 1870s the first Wesleyan Methodist Church in Toowoomba was too small for the growing congregation which was established in the early 1860s. The first Wesleyan Methodist services were held in Toowoomba in 1858 when Rev. Samuel Wilkinson visited the Darling Downs on a preaching tour. It was not until 1863 that a permanent minister was appointed to Toowoomba. In 1865 the Ipswich Wesleyan Methodist Circuit was divided forming the Toowoomba Circuit which comprised Toowoomba, Drayton, Ware's Farm, Jondaryan and Gatton.

To service the Wesleyan Methodist congregation in Toowoomba a stone church in Neil Street was constructed in 1864–65, prior to which services were held in a large building owned by the Presbyterian Church. A foundation stone for the first Wesleyan Methodist church, designed by James Cowlishaw, was laid by Mrs Groom on 19 October 1864. The church, a rectangular planned masonry building, was opened on 2 April 1865. This building was rendered inadequate for the growing congregation and temporary use was made of the School of Arts hall, but more permanent accommodation was sought.

=== Second Wesleyan Methodist Church ===
The 1865 church and land was sold and another block, Suburban Allotment Thirteen of Section Seven, in Neil Street near the previous site was purchased on 13 April 1876 by trustees of the church for the sum of £550. Willoughby Powell was then commissioned to design a church for the site. Powell was in Toowoomba supervising the construction of the Toowoomba Grammar School. Earlier, Powell worked for Richard Gailey before joining the Queensland Public Works Department as a draftsman in 1874, when he won a competition for the design of the Toowoomba Grammar School. He maintained a practice in Toowoomba from 1875 to 1877 designing many buildings including the Jewish Synagogue and several large houses.

The foundation stone of the Neil Street Wesleyan Methodist Church was laid by the Governor on 14 August 1877. As well, several smaller memorial stones were laid by ladies of the congregation and town. The contractor for the job was R Godsall, with a Mr Hudson responsible for internal fittings. The construction cost was approximately A£2,300.

The former church was constructed of face brick with rendered masonry and freestone detailing and a high pitched gabled roof clad with timber shingles. The plan of the church was rectangular with entrance provided from two porches on either side of the western gable facing Neil Street and a small vestry extending from the eastern elevation. A tall broach spire surmounted the apex of the western facade. Internally, a semi-circular preaching rostrum, defined by curved timber balustrading was centrally situated adjacent to the eastern wall of the church. Evidence of this early arrangement survives in the church today.

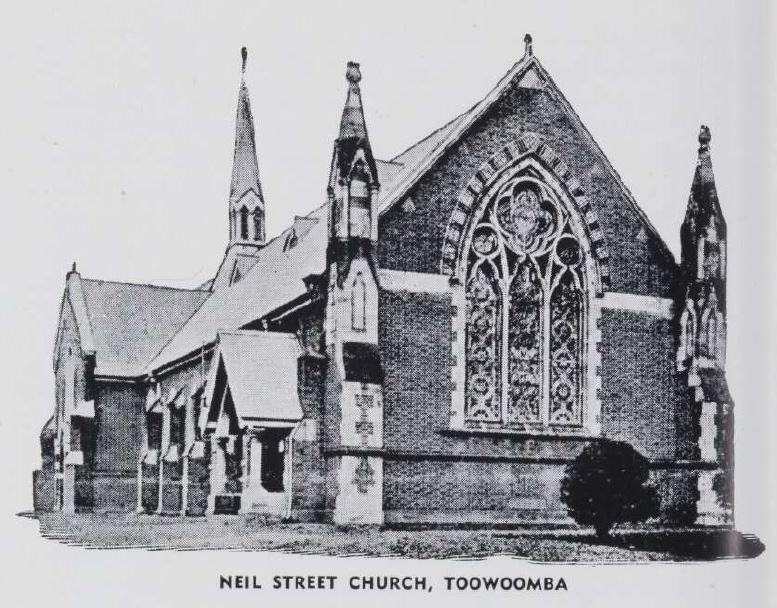
Neil Street Methodist Church, c. 1947

The former church was opened on 4 August 1878 and a report in a local newspaper, The Toowoomba Chronicle and Darling Downs Advertiser, provided a description of the ceremony and the building, which is described as "domestic Gothic very freely treated". This alludes to the simple design of the building in a Gothic revival style; a style widely employed on the churches of many Christian religious denominations during the second half of the nineteenth century. Among the elements which contributed to the style and which are found on the Neil Street Wesleyan Methodist Church is the steeply pitched roof, lancet window openings, stained glass panels, broach spire and internal fittings such as carved joinery, heavy timber trusses and, when constructed, a richly painted and gilded roof lining and internal decoration.

One of the particularly noteworthy features of the 1877 building was a large stained glass filled window opening in the western wall. This tracery window comprising three foiled lancets and a quatrefoil centred above them, was fitted with stained glass panels by Ashwin and Falconer of Pitt Street, Sydney.

Ashwin and Falconer were a Sydney partnership of Frederick Ashwin and John Falconer who formed by 1877 under the name Falconer and Ashwin, reversing the order of the names only later. Falconer was one of the earliest Sydney stained glaziers establishing his business in 1863 after his arrival in Australia from Britain in 1856. He continued in practice until 1892 when Ashwin and Falconer became known as Ashwin and Co. The company produced many outstanding windows including the glazed dome in the Sydney Town Hall. At least three known commissions were undertaken in Queensland including two figured panels at Farrington House in Alderley (since removed from this house and in an unknown private collection); panels for St James' Church of England in Toowoomba which were designed by Edmund Blacket & Son as well as the window in the Neil Street Wesley Uniting Church.

In 1882, the Neil Street Church acquired a timber school room, designed by local architect James Marks. Early photographs of this building show a timber boarded structure with simple gabled roof to the north of the church. This building was extended in 1961 when a brick envelope was added, earlier alterations to this building include the addition of a stage proscenium in the first half of this century.

During the 1880s and early 1890s in Toowoomba, many of the other religious denomination built permanent masonry churches, including the Primitive Methodist Church (1881); the Presbyterian Church built opposite and facing the Wesleyan Methodist Church in Neil Street (1882); the Roman Catholic Church (1883–89); and the Lutheran Church (c. 1887).

The local architect, William Hodgen junior, was commissioned in 1901 to extend the eastern end of the church with transepts and a vestry. This was four years after the unification of the Wesleyan and Primitive Methodist Churches. Primitive Methodism was established in the town in 1877 and was run from a church in Raff Street constructed in 1881. With the amalgamation, the Neil Street Wesleyan Church became the centre of Methodism in Toowoomba and the extension of 1901 may have been prompted by this reason.

In c. 1924, a masonry fence and an iron gateway and gate were erected, replacing an earlier timber paling fence, to the memory of George Pitlow Merry who died on 30 October 1924.

The Architecture, Engineering and Building Journal indicated that Cook and Kerrison, architects to the Methodist church, called tenders for the additions of a wall and porch to the church, however it is thought that this work was actually to be carried out on the adjacent school hall.

=== Formation of the Uniting Church in Australia ===
In 1977 when the Uniting Church was officially formed by the amalgamation of Methodist, Presbyterian and Congregational Churches, the Neil Street Wesleyan Methodist Church became a Uniting Church known as the Wesley Uniting Church. At that time the land was divested from the, then defunct, Methodist Church to become the property of the Uniting Church.

In 1998, the former church was incorporated with its neighbouring building, the Empire Theatre, where it serves as a function room connected by a glass walkway.

== Description ==
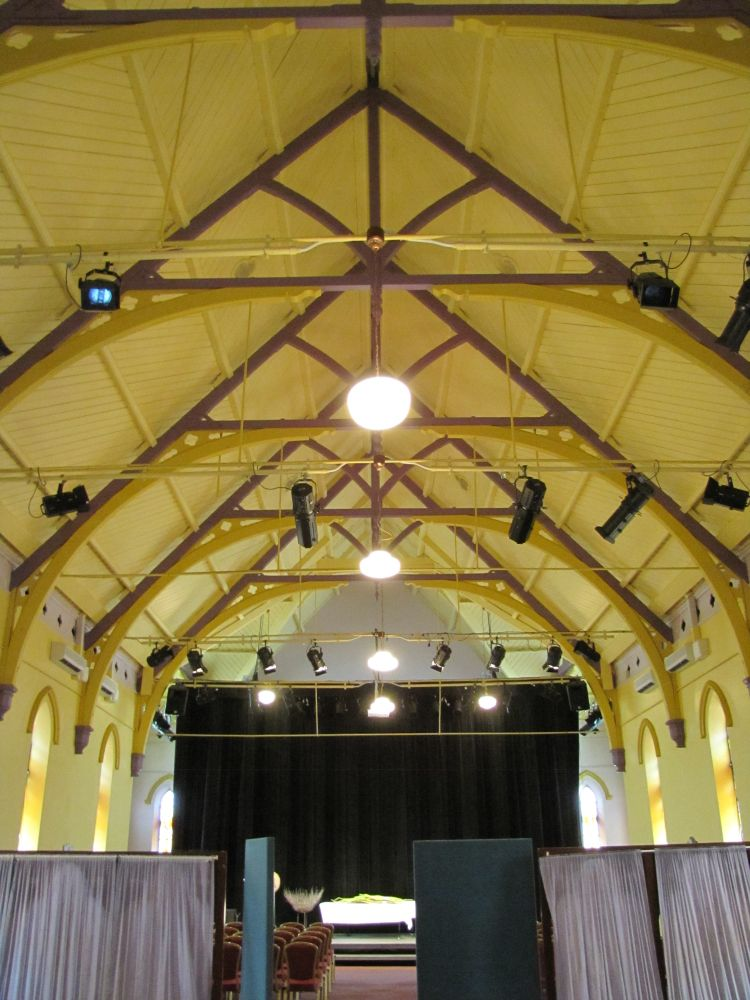
The interior of the former church, 2012

The former Wesley Uniting Church faces Neil Street to the west, directly opposite St Stephens Uniting Church. The building is located adjoining the Empire Theatre to the south.

The former church is constructed of Flemish bond brickwork with expressed coursing and rendered stone window surrounds and buttress caps, and has a rib and pan gable roof with ventilation gablets. The west elevation is framed by rendered turrets surmounting a buttresses at each corner, and contains a large pointed arch stained glass window consisting of three lights surmounted by a large quatrefoil. Entry porches are located on the north and south at the western end, and consist of low rib and pan gable roofs supported by short columns on large square bases, with pointed arch paired timber doors. Windows to the nave are lancet shaped, and the north and south transepts have a large intersecting tracery window surmounting a gabled pointed arch doorway which is flanked by lancet windows.

The interior of the former church has rendered walls scribed to imitate ashlar stonework, and the roof construction consists of arched brace timber trusses supported by stone corbels. These trusses have original metal ties, which were incorporated to overcome the need for heavy king-posts, and diagonal timber lining boards with quatrefoil fretwork panels at the cornice line. The east wall has a pointed arch recess behind a large pipe organ, which has a curved timber screen at the front of the organist's seat, which is flanked by pointed arch doorways to the vestry. A low timber and glass narthex has been constructed under the west window between the north and south entry doors, and supports the relocated pulpit rostrum rail. The seating has been rearranged to form a semi-circle facing the south wall of the transept.

A single-storeyed face brick addition is connected to the north transept via an open walkway and adjoins a timber hall located to the northeast of the church. This structure has brick buttresses, a parapet wall concealing the roof, lancet windows with sandstone surrounds and a foundation stone dated 1961. The timber hall has a corrugated iron gable roof, weatherboard cladding, and a single-storeyed brick addition along its southern elevation.

The northern brick addition houses a kindergarten with a kitchen connected to the western end of the timber hall. The hall is entered from the southwest corner, and has a hardboard panelled ceiling with a stage at the eastern end with a stylised proscenium arch. Backstage contains storage areas, and the southern addition to the hall contains various rooms.

The Neil Street frontage has a metal fence with driveway entrances at the north and south end, and central metal gates with English bond brick gate posts with rendered details and commemorative plaques. The church grounds contain a semi-circular drive to the west front, with various commemorative plantings, and a driveway along the southern side to the rear.

== Heritage listing ==
The former Wesley Uniting Church was listed on the Queensland Heritage Register on 10 May 1997 having satisfied the following criteria.

The place is important in demonstrating the evolution or pattern of Queensland's history.

The former Wesley Uniting Church demonstrates the growth of Toowoomba during the 1870s. The Church demonstrates the spread of Wesleyan Methodism throughout Queensland

The place demonstrates rare, uncommon or endangered aspects of Queensland's cultural heritage.

The former church houses a rare and fine example in Queensland of the stained glass work of the prolific Sydney stained glass manufacturers, Ashwin and Falconer.

The place is important in demonstrating the principal characteristics of a particular class of cultural places.

The former church with its early Gothic inspiration, simple form and internal arrangement demonstrates the principal characteristics of a Wesleyan Methodist Church of the 1870s in regional Queensland.

The place is important because of its aesthetic significance.

Through its form, materials and siting, the former Wesley Uniting Church makes a significant aesthetic contribution to the Neil Street streetscape and Toowoomba townscape. Together with St Stephen's Uniting Church, directly opposite to the west, the church is part of an important ecclesiastic group.

The place has a strong or special association with a particular community or cultural group for social, cultural or spiritual reasons.

The building has been the centre of firstly, the Wesleyan Methodist, then the Methodist religion in Toowoomba since its construction in 1877. Since 1977 it has been a Uniting Church. The building has special associations for the Uniting Church.

The place has a special association with the life or work of a particular person, group or organisation of importance in Queensland's history.

The former church is associated with the architect Willoughby Powell, and is one of his few Toowoomba buildings.
