= Queens Building =

Queens Building may refer to:

- Queens Building, Heathrow, England
- Queens Building, Townsville, Queensland
- Queen's Building, Central, Hong Kong
- Queen's Building, Wolverhampton, England
- Queen's Building, University of Bristol, Bristol, England
