= Baddow House =

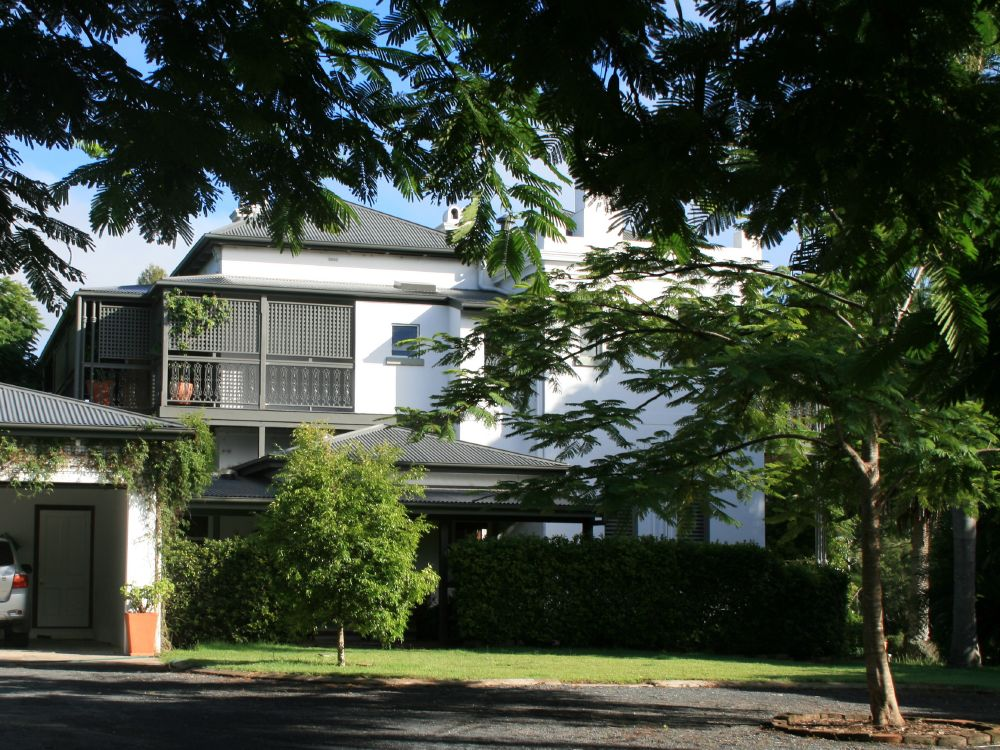
- Baddow House, 2009

- Location within Queensland
- 25.5269°S 152.6728°E
- Location: 366 Queen Street, Maryborough, Fraser Coast Region, Queensland, Australia

History
- Design period: 1870s–1890s (late 19th century)
- Built: 1883

Site notes
- Architect: Willoughby Powell
- Architectural style: Georgian

Queensland Heritage Register
- Official name: Baddow House
- Type: state heritage (built, landscape)
- Designated: 21 October 1992
- Reference no.: 600690
- Significant period: 1880s (fabric); 1880s–1900s (historical)
- Significant components: garden/grounds, tank – water (underground), terracing, residential accommodation – main house
- Builders: F Kinne

Baddow House is a heritage-listed detached house at 366 Queen Street, Maryborough, Fraser Coast Region, Queensland, Australia. It was designed by Willoughby Powell and built in 1883 by F Kinne. It was added to the Queensland Heritage Register on 21 October 1992.

== History ==
Baddow House is a large brick residence constructed in 1883 for Edgar Thomas Aldridge and his family. It was designed by (at the time) Maryborough architect Willoughby Powell and constructed by local builder Fritz Kinne on high riverside land adjacent to the original site of Maryborough.

The original town of Maryborough, originally and unofficially called Wide Bay Village, was established on the Mary River approximately eight kilometres upstream from the current town centre. In August or September 1847 George Furber built a wharf and store on the southern bank of what was then generally called Wide Bay River. It operated as a reception centre for squatters running sheep in the area and primarily provided transport for wool. The river was officially named Mary River on 7 September 1847 by Governor Sir Charles Fitz Roy and the first shipment of wool was dispatched from the wharf in December 1847.

Edgar Aldridge was born in either Great Baddow or Little Baddow in Essex, England. It is believed that Aldridge named the house after his birthplace. He immigrated to Australia. Well born and educated, he became a hotel keeper on the Macleay River near Kempsey, New South Wales from about 1843 and began a variety of business pursuits. In June 1849 he married widow Maria Sarah Slater (nee Steele), a former convict. She had a child, Frederick Slater, from her previous marriage and Edgar and Maria had two children, Maria Rachael and Harry Edgar. In late 1849 the family moved to Maryborough. Edgar had visited the previous year to establish his businesses.

The Aldridges settled on the northern bank almost opposite Furber's wharf, establishing a store, wharves for timber and wool trading, and the settlement's first hotel, the Bush Inn. Other settlers arrived and chose to settle near Aldridge. Furber then relocated his operations to the more popular northern bank.

The first years of settlement were extraordinarily troubled with deadly conflict between Europeans and Aborigines. This situation discouraged settlement. Aldridge petitioned the New South Wales government to send extra troopers in order to encourage settlement. The struggling settlement was officially named Maryborough on 23 January 1849.

In 1850 Surveyor Hugh Roland Labatt arrived in Maryborough with instructions to "examine the River Mary ... to suggest ... the best site or sites for the laying out of the town, having regard to the convenience of shipping on one hand and internal communication on the other ... also ... point out the spots desirable as reserves for public building, church, quay and for places for public recreation". The site recommended by Labatt was not where settlement was already established but further east, a decision not well received by the existing settlers who had invested time and money into the original township. Immediately, a government wharf was established at the new location able to service larger ships than was previously possible, effectively ending further development of the old town. Over the following decade the town relocated to its current location where it quickly thrived. The old town was abandoned and most of the buildings removed by 1856.

The Aldridges lived in their Bush Inn upon settling in Maryborough. Another child, Joey Edgar Aldridge was born in 1850 but died in 1851. At 1852 land sales of the new township, Edgar purchased many allotments in the new town and re-established his businesses there. In 1854 he purchased land at the old town including five allotments covering over 18,200 sqm. This land included part of a creek and the end of a spur of high land to the south. Aldridge built a timber slab house here. The land overlooked the nearby wharves and Aldridge's store and inn which soon ceased operation. The Aldridges cultivated extensive and productive gardens including experimental exotic species such as sugar cane, the first grown in the area. This established the viability of what would become an important and profitable crop for Maryborough. By 1863 the area was being called Baddow, presumably after the Aldridge house, but Aldridge letters and diaries call the area West Maryborough or The Old Town. The Aldridge finances improved rapidly with speculative land purchases and successful business ventures and in 1860 Edgar retired from business with management passing to his son Harry. Edgar held the position of Alderman of Maryborough from 1861 to 1864 and 1865 to 1866.

The 1880s were prosperous for the colony of Queensland as migration and capital investment created unprecedented growth. Maryborough's growth was based on its role as the main port and centre for an extensive pastoral industry in the Wide Bay district, a sugar industry in the immediate vicinity of Maryborough, the Gympie goldfields, a timber industry in and around the main waterways, coal mining at Burrum and manufacturing industries such as Walker's foundry. Maryborough's dominance as a regional centre was also strengthened by its role as the terminus for the railway line south to Gympie which was completed in 1881. Many significant buildings were constructed in the late 1870s and 1880s in Maryborough including: Maryborough Court House (1877), Bank of New South Wales (1877), St Paul's Church of England] (1879), Maryborough Railway Station (1880), Maryborough Boys Grammar School (1881), Criterion Hotel (1883), Maryborough Mortuary Chapel (1884), Maryborough Base Hospital (1888), and the Maryborough School of Arts (1888).

During Maryborough's prosperous period of the late 1870s and 1880s wealthy residents constructed fine, architect-designed suburban villas. During this period, the middle-class home was a stage for social ritual and was an outward manifestation of the occupant's status in the community. The middle-class desired to emulate the lifestyle of the English gentry. Suburban villas were often built on the fringes of established urban areas throughout the colony, remote from the town centres. They are characterised by a semi-rural grandeur brought about by an elaborate and substantial detached house of a Classical style surrounded by a large restful garden. In Maryborough these included: villa for John Vivian Williams, Churchill Street (1879), Doon Villa (c.1882), Riversleigh, corner North and Elizabeth Streets (1882), villa for JE Brown, Woodstock Street (1882), villa for Robert Hart (1883), and Philadelphia Villa, corner Lennox and North Streets (1884).

Construction of Baddow House was begun in 1883. It cost approximately £6600 and replaced the previous Aldridge house except for the detached kitchen which was retained for use in the new house. It was designed by architect Willoughby Powell (c.1848–1920) who came to Maryborough in 1882 to capitalise on the building boom in the growing town. Powell was born in Cheltenham, England where he trained as an architect before immigrating to Queensland in 1872. He worked for Brisbane architect Richard Gailey before joining the Queensland Public Works Department in 1874. Powell won a competition for the design of the Toowoomba Grammar School (1875) and left the Department of Public Works to supervise its construction. Other examples of Powell's work include Warwick Town Hall (1888) and Toowoomba City Hall (1900). Baddow House for 'Maryborough's wealthiest resident' was one of his first works completed during his three-year stay in Maryborough. He completed at least 14 projects including two other villas in the town as well as shops, hotels, a mortuary chapel, and a parsonage. Baddow House was built by local builder Carl Friedrich "Fritz" Kinne (1844–1929), a German immigrant who arrived in Maryborough in 1871. Kinne was responsible for constructing many Maryborough buildings, including the extensions for St Mary's Roman Catholic Church for architect FDG Stanley in 1884, and was later elected Alderman (1890–98) and the Mayor of Maryborough (1895).

Maria Aldridge's health began to decline in the early 1880s and Aldridge diaries suggest she spent the majority of her last years at another Aldridge property at Booral, by the sea. She died at Booral 17 March 1886. Edgar paid for the construction of memorials to her within Maryborough - St Thomas's Church of England and a large free-standing bell tower for St Paul's Church of England - that were completed in 1887.

Edgar died 18 May 1888 in Baddow House. He was not a wealthy man by this time and when the house passed to his son Harry, who lived there with his wife Lappy and their children until his death 4 February 1910, in 1912 the Bank of New South Wales foreclosed on the property and disposed of it by auction. Lappy Aldridge and her children moved to the Booral property.

After the Aldridges, the house passed through many hands. First, it was transferred to Hugh Biddles in 1913. After his death in 1939, it was transferred to Ethel Stiler in 1942. Under her ownership the verandahs were removed and the grounds were cleared of gardens. During the clearing of the gardens, a Canary Island Date Palm that survived from the Aldridge years was damaged in a rubbish fire. A photo taken during the latter years of the Stiler's ownership clearly shows the burnt stump has a regrowth shoot. Around this time the house is thought to have been used briefly as a girls' boarding house for St Mary's Catholic School, Maryborough. Baddow House was transferred to the Crown in 1950 with the intention of use as a migrant hostel. This never occurred and the house remained empty and unused and was greatly vandalised. In 1954 the Boy Scouts Association of Queensland used Baddow House as their meeting hall. By this time the kitchen that had been retained from the previous house had been demolished, although the cellar under it survived. During the occupation by the Scouts some repair of the vandalism was undertaken by caretakers. Allotments 1 and 2, upon which the house stands, were purchased in 1967 by Donald and Daphne Scott. The remainder of the estate land continues to be in Crown ownership and is part of the parkland reserved for the Old Maryborough Town Site. It was then purchased by John and Lois Hastings in 1973, John Stevens in 1981, Tony Nioa in April 1986, and then by Barrie and Janice Christison in November 1986. The Christisons used the upper floor as their residence and opened the lower floor as a museum, displaying historical paraphernalia. In 1988 buried bricks were uncovered while building a car park. These were considered to be from the cellar now buried and filled with earth. The opening of the house as a museum was well-published, popular, and successful. In this period when Maryborough was generally promoting itself as a "Heritage City" the house gained a high profile within the local community which continues today.

In 2003 the house was purchased by Ian Russell and Anne De Lisle. The house underwent a substantial renovation during the following three years. Local architect, Marion Graham, managed the project which included concrete underpinning, repair of rendering internally and externally, rebuilding of verandahs, and the construction of a one- storey wing to the south corner containing kitchen, garage, study, and bathroom. With reconstruction, the interior is a combination of new and original fabric. This work included recovery, repair, and rehanging of the large folding cedar doors in the ground floor reception rooms; rebuilding fireplace surrounds; repair or replacement of cedar joinery, doors and windows rehung or replaced; floors and ceilings repaired with some replacements of boards; and the whole interior plastered and painted. The reconstruction of the verandah was done to the dimensions and character of the original. The gardens were extensively redeveloped and planted. Much of the renovation was done by local tradespeople. The book "A Grand Passion: A memoir" by owner Anne De Lisle published in 2007 documents this period and the work undertaken and has raised the public profile of the house significantly.

Baddow House remains a private residence in 2011. Highly regarded by the local community, it is occasionally used as a venue for fundraising events.

== Description ==
Baddow House is a large, two-storey Neo-Georgian residence with an extensive garden on the northern end of a ridge beside the Mary River, Maryborough. It is one of the largest residences in Maryborough. On two equal lots totalling 7,284 square metres (78,400 sq ft), the land is bound on the north- western and south-western sides by treed parkland, on the north- eastern side by an unformed road reserve for Queen Street, and on the south-eastern side by Russell Street. The front of the house faces north-east to the road reserve and views to the Mary River are to the west.

The building is of brick construction rendered and scored to resemble ashlar coursing. It has a hipped roof clad with corrugated metal sheets and a timber verandah with twin steel posts and decorative cast iron balustrade that wraps around the north-east, north-west, and south-west sides on both levels. The building, sitting within an established garden of lawns, trees, and garden beds, is in a Neo- Georgian style and the principal elevations are symmetrically composed. The house roof has three large, cement-rendered chimneys with mouldings and conical metal roof ventilators.

The north-eastern (front) elevation is viewed from the reserve of Queen Street below. A wide, central, cement-rendered stair leads from the garden onto the verandah. Flanking the entrance doorway and projecting onto the verandah are two octagonal bay windows rising across both levels with separate hipped roofs. Entrance is through a large round arched opening fitted with a panelled door surrounded by sidelight and a fanlight. The windows are large square headed openings fitted with double-hung, timber framed sashes.

The verandah is a reconstruction; has a timber floor, decorative cast-metal balustrade, frieze, and brackets; timber handrail; and panels of timber lattice screening the corners of the upper level. Under its own roof, the verandah wraps around to the symmetrical north-western elevation composed of three large windows and continues around onto the south-western elevation composed of one octagonal bay window and a secondary entrance via a central square-headed opening fitted with a panelled and glazed door surrounded by sidelights and a fanlight. The rear, south-eastern elevation, visible from Russell Street, has a central back door and a projecting service block at the eastern end containing laundry (ground floor) and bathroom (first floor). The laundry has large timber fixed louvred windows and the bathroom has small square-headed windows. The service block has a parapet roof that conceals a roof level water tank that supplied the rooms below. This tank was filled by a hand pump mounted externally on the wall at ground level which is connected to the underground beehive tanks nearby. The verandah on the upper level returns along the rear facade at the western end but it is narrower. Abutting the southern corner of the rear is a one-storey extension with hipped roofs and a large awning. This extension is designed to imitate traditional detail but is not of cultural heritage significance.

The plan of the two-storey part of the house is repeated on the two levels. A central, T-shaped hall provides access to the five main rooms and a decorative timber switch back stair with decorative turned balustrade and carved newel post finial provides vertical circulation. Generally, the interior walls are plaster with timber skirtings, timber architraves, and plaster cornices, all moulded. The floors and ceilings are timber boards. Internal doors are timber with four panels with bolection moulding and glazed horizontal-pivoting fanlights. The six fireplaces have moulded timber mantelpieces and metal fire surrounds and either a metal grate or stove. A timber partition of horizontal beaded boards divides the northern rooms on the upper level and this wall in the lower level contains large folding door with six panels with bolection moulding and matching timber panelling above the opening. The ceilings on the ground floor rooms are 4.2 metres (14 ft) high with those of the first floor being 3.7 metres (12 ft) high. The house contains cedar joinery throughout. The house contains much furniture and paintings brought into the house by the current owners. An octagonal side table and two framed paintings are in the dining room and may have been owned by the Aldridges. The Aldridge Collection is held by the Maryborough Military and Colonial Museum and contains domestic items donated to the museum by a member of the Aldridge family. It may give providence for the side table and paintings and also evidence of the domestic history of Baddow House.

During World War II, the iron lacework was removed from the verandahs to contribute to the war effort.

The garden shows evidence of past landscaping including terracing for a past driveway and decorative cast-iron fence posts with chain link fence. There are two large brick underground "beehive" water tanks in the grounds near the house. One is near the south-east side of the house and is 5.2 metres (17 ft) in width and of a similar depth. The other is further down the bank in front of the house and is of a similar construction. A Canary Island Date Palm (Phoenix canariensis) is planted near the front (northern) steps. Nothing of the other vegetation on the site is of cultural heritage significance.

Archaeological evidence may survive in the grounds or under the house that may provide information pertaining to the 1850s to 1880s occupation of the site by the first settlers in Maryborough or of earlier landscaping elements of the house.

== Heritage listing ==
Baddow House was listed on the Queensland Heritage Register on 21 October 1992 having satisfied the following criteria.

The place is important in demonstrating the evolution or pattern of Queensland's history.

Baddow House, Maryborough (1883) provides evidence of the development of regional Queensland during the economic boom of the 1870s and 1880s when Maryborough, already a busy port, became a major regional town and agricultural, pastoral, industrial, and commercial centre for Queensland.

The place, combined with surviving documentary and photographic evidence, contributes to our understanding of the way of life of wealthy families in the establishment and development of major regional towns.

The place has potential to yield information that will contribute to an understanding of Queensland's history.

Baddow House has the potential to reveal further information about domestic life of wealthy regional Queenslanders in the 1880s through an examination of the existing fabric in combination with documentary evidence. In particular, the examination of the water reticulation system, including beehive water tanks, hand pump, and rooftop tank, which is a rare and early hydraulic system, may provide further information regarding the technical accomplishments in providing domestic services that were sophisticated for the time.

Baddow House has the potential to contribute to our understanding of the effects of the 1870s-1880s economic boom on an important early regional Queensland community. Baddow House has potential to contain important subsurface archaeological features and deposits from the 1850s to the early 20th century. This may include evidence associated with the second Baddow House (c. 1854-c. 1883), the construction and design of the extant house and early gardens, and its ownership by two generations of the Aldridge family. Archaeological investigations of Baddow House may inform on consumption choices and patterns of the Aldridge family before, during and after the 1870s-1880s boom period. These investigations may provide an important insight into the perceptions of class and taste over an extended time and in a period of important social and economic change in Maryborough.

The place is important in demonstrating the principal characteristics of a particular class of cultural places.

Baddow House is important in demonstrating the principal characteristics of a substantial, architect-designed Queensland suburban villa of the late 19th century. These characteristics include: the form (detached, two-storeyed); structural materials (brick); planning of both the house (public rooms downstairs, attached rear service rooms, bedrooms on the upper floor, and verandahs) and the grounds (siting of the house overlooking the river amongst landscaped gardens); and decorative detailing and finishes (including external render, internal plaster, ornate cedar joinery, panelled doors, stained glass). The place evokes a strong sense of grace, genteel languor, tranquillity and seclusion through its setting - a characteristic of the original design which rarely survives at other suburban villas in Queensland.

It is a fine example of the work of Queensland architect, Willoughby Powell and of Maryborough builder Fritz Kinne, both skilled professionals, prominent and successful within their fields.
