= Gabbinbar Homestead =

Gabbinbar
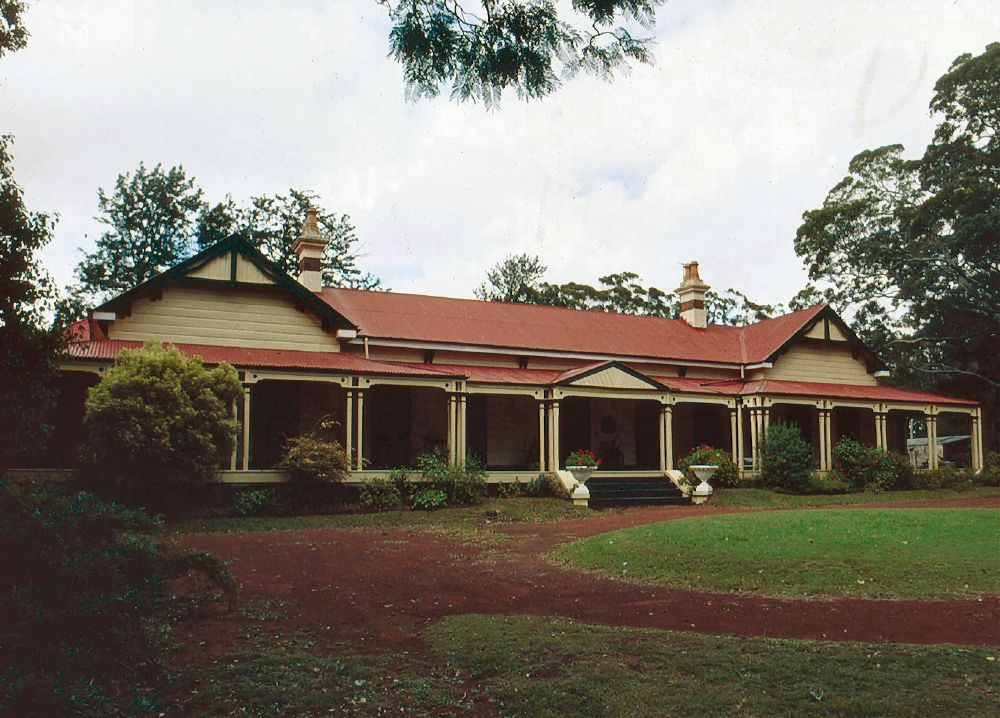
- Gabbinbar, 1997

- Location within Queensland Location within Australia
- 27.6115°S 151.9597°E
- Location: 344–376 Ramsay Street, Middle Ridge, Toowoomba, Toowoomba Region, Queensland, Australia

History
- Design period: 1870s–1890s (late 19th century)
- Built: 1876
- Built for: Reverend Dr William Lambie Nelson

Site notes
- Architect: Willoughby Powell

Queensland Heritage Register
- Official name: Gabbinbar
- Type: state heritage (built, landscape)
- Designated: 21 October 1992
- Reference no.: 600840
- Significant period: 1870s–1930s (fabric); 1870s–1940s (historical)
- Significant components: garden/grounds, garden – bed/s, cellar, kitchen/kitchen house, steps/stairway, residential accommodation – main house, fence/wall – perimeter, billiards room, gate – entrance, out building/s, trees/plantings, views from, carriage way/drive, gatehouse, ballroom, terracing
- Builders: Richard Godsall

Gabbinbar is a heritage-listed villa at 344–376 Ramsay Street, Toowoomba, Middle Ridge, Toowoomba Region, Queensland, Australia. It was designed by architect Willoughby Powell for the Rev. Dr. William Lambie Nelson and built in 1876 by Richard Godsall. It was added to the Queensland Heritage Register on 21 October 1992.

== History ==
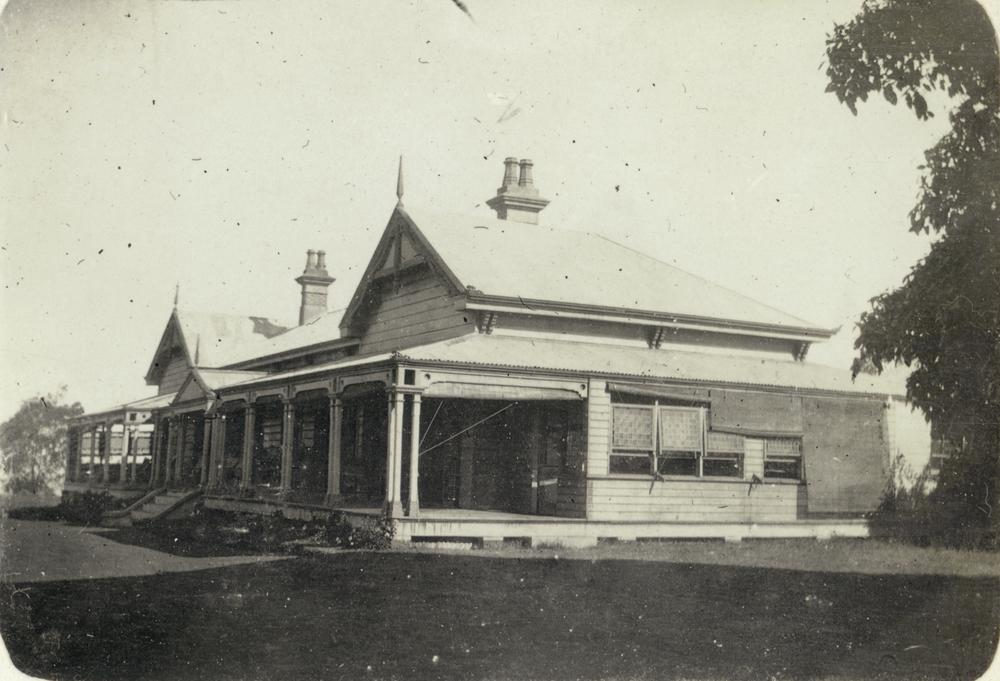
Gabbinar, 1908

Gabbinbar is a low-set, single-storey timber residence built for The Reverend William Lambie Nelson in 1876.

Rev Nelson was of Scottish origin and arrived in Australia in 1853 after being invited by the Sydney Presbytery to take spiritual charge of the Presbyterians in the district of Ipswich. He resigned from this position in 1860 to take up pastoral pursuits on the Moonie River. Prior to his resignation, he was encouraging subscriptions for a new Church of Scotland to be built in Toowoomba, and he was identified as a Presbyterian minister in Toowoomba in 1868.

Although the title for the land on which Gabbinbar is located was not transferred to Nelson until 1870, it is thought that he purchased it in 1863.

The first structure built on the property of approximately 100 acres (40 ha) was a small red brick house, which remains and is now used as the kitchen. In 1876, this initial structure was greatly added to in the form of a long, low set timber residence. Designed by Toowoomba architect Willoughby Powell and constructed by local builder, Richard Godsall, it comprised a central entrance vestibule flanked by two large rooms on either side and a connecting hall at the rear. French doors opened from all rooms onto 10-foot (3.0 m) wide verandahs, which surrounded the core. It was described in 1940 as a long cream-walled house, with wide-spreading verandahs and simple gracious lines fronting verdant lawns and gay flower-beds.

The setting contributes to the picturesque qualities of the place which is entered through one of two heavily treed driveways. The carriage loop is still evident in front of the house, which is surrounded by rose gardens and many species of mature trees including jacarandas, palms, bunya pines and most notably, an immense Moreton Bay fig at the intersection of the two driveways.

In 1881, James Marks tendered for additions, alterations and painting at Gabbinbar. It is thought that this was the addition of the ballroom and guest rooms on the southern side of the house. The ballroom is immense, and was also a venue for family wedding receptions and Christmas parties, and probably for many social events during occupancy by the Governors.

In June 1887, the Rev Nelson died and his son Hugh took over Gabbinbar. Sir Hugh Muir Nelson was born in Scotland and migrated to Australia with his family in 1853. He managed many early Queensland stations, including three for his father, and later, Eton Vale for Hodgson and Watts. He later acquired the property of Louden near Dalby with Watts. His first attempt at entering politics in 1879 was unsuccessful, however by 1883 he was a Member of the Queensland Legislative Assembly for Northern Downs. This was the beginning of an active political career during which he served as the first Secretary for Railways and Public Works, Treasurer of Queensland, Premier of Queensland and Lieutenant Governor. It was during Sir Hugh's time at Gabbinbar that the place became the focus of many social events on the Downs.

Sir Hugh died in 1906 and Gabbinbar was passed to his son Duncan, who was at the time managing a family property in Northern Queensland. He did not return to Gabbinbar for some years, and the house was occupied by Lady Nelson and her daughter Maud.

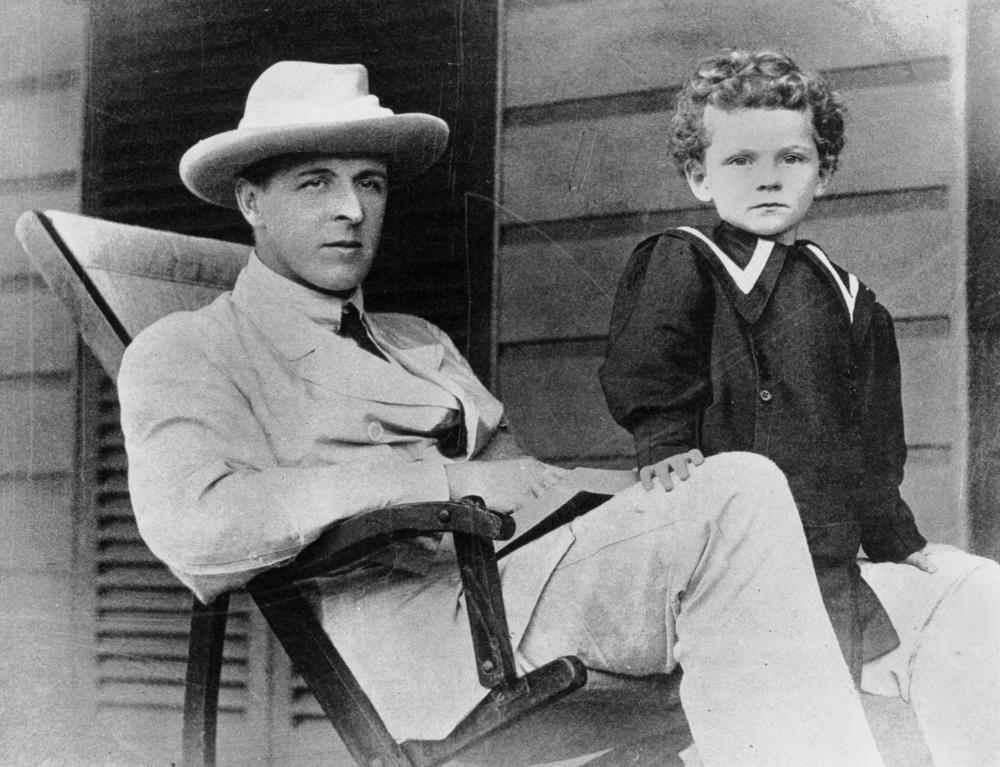
Lord Chelmsford with his youngest son, Andrew, Queensland, 1907

From 1906 to 1909, Gabbinbar was the summer residence of the Governor of Queensland, Lord Chelmsford and his family. The publication "Darling Downs: The Garden of Australia", refers to this stating that Toowoomba, the recognised summer resort of Queensland, is thronged with visitors in the warmer months. The State Governor, Lord Chelmsford, has his summer residence, here, leasing "Gabbinbar", the property of Lady Nelson, widow of the late Sir H. M Nelson......for several years, Premier of the State. The use of the residence as a summer retreat for the governor continued the pattern of use of several Toowoomba residences in this manner. Fernside was used as a place of summer residence by Sir Arthur Kennedy, Governor of Queensland from 1877 to 1883, while Harlaxton House was rented by Lord Lamington, the eighth governor of Queensland (1896–1901).

The same publications describes the area in which Gabbinbar was located as comprising suburban farms and gardens [growing] apples, pears, apricots, peaches, nectarines, mulberries, oranges, strawberries, plums, loquats, quinces and other fruits. The remembrances of Ellie Pacey who lived near Gabbinbar c. 1916 also describes the area as a fruit growing region. She also remembers a couple living at the lodge (gatehouse) who opened the gates for visitors who rang the bell.

The building now known as the gardeners cottage was moved to the site in 1932. It is thought to have previously been a church, but was used as a billiards room and is sited picturesquely in a wooded area adjacent to the main house.

In 1936, Duncan Nelson died, leaving his widow Colina at Gabbinbar. Colina remained at the property until 1970, apart from the period between May 1942 and July 3 when the house was used by the 2/1st Corps Field Survey Company AIF to house the survey, drafting and reproduction sections. At the end of their occupation, the Defence Department commissioned Cliff Williamson to supervise restoration of the house to the condition prior to Army occupation. Colina Nelson sold the property to Treveren and Joan Liesegang in 1970. At this stage, the house had no electricity and inadequate plumbing. Upgrading of these services and much maintenance and repair works was undertaken by the Liesegangs. They ensured the property remained accessible to the public, using it as a venue for various fund raising events.

In 1992, another building was moved onto the property at the rear of the main house on what was thought to be the site of an earlier cottage. The new building was previously the cottage of well known naturalist Mr Pat Walker, known locally as the "spider man" due to his scientific work with spiders. Walker was associated with Gabbinbar, having collected funnel-web spiders from the site for use at the Commonwealth Serum Laboratory where a vaccine was developed. He was also long-time friends with the Liesegangs.

When the property changed ownership in 1995, it was unoccupied and in a deteriorated state.

In about 2000, the property was purchased by Barry Bernoth to convert into a wedding venue. However, it took some time for him to persuade the Toowoomba City Council to allow the house to be used for that purpose. Having eventually gained council approval and after painstaking restoration the property, weddings have been held at Gabbinbar since 2012.

== Description ==
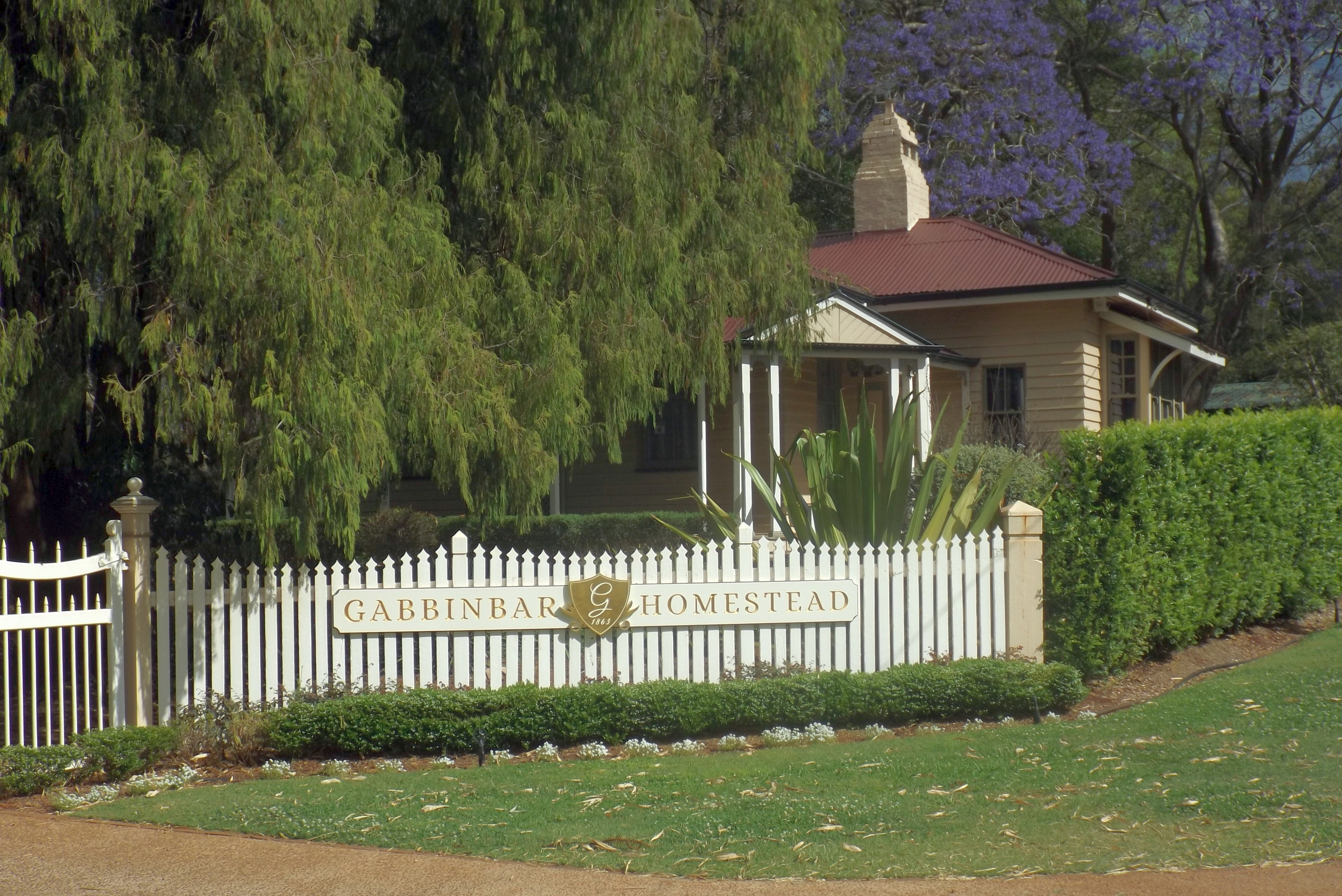
Gabbinbar signage at northern entrance, 2014

Gabbinbar is located in a picturesque garden setting and is surrounded by a number of buildings and garden elements, some of which are also significant.

Access to the house is provided by two driveways, the first of which has a house, known as the gatehouse at its entrance. This building is a small weatherboard structure with a corrugated iron roof and a side verandah with a corner entrance. It is surrounded by mature plantings, including a jacaranda tree and a substantial plot of bamboo.

The second driveway leads to the rear of the house, past a small cottage which was relocated to the site. This cottage is a typical late nineteenth century timber house, and a plaque on its front attributes it to the residence of Gerald Walker, naturalist and "spider man" of Toowoomba. The entire interior of this house is unpainted. It is currently unoccupied and appears to be a store for items, possibly from the main house. At the rear of this building is a small garage and further to the rear, a small outbuilding.

On the opposite side of the driveway, and nearer to the principal house is a building known as the billiards room, or the schoolhouse. It is of chamferboard construction, with a gable roof of corrugated iron. The front gable is finished with a decorative bargeboard, similar in style to those on the main house. Access is via a central door which is reached by a timber step. Double hung windows are located on either side of the front door, and three evenly spaced double hung windows are located along each side elevation. Internally, the walls are clad in unpainted vertical boarding and a brick fireplace is located at the rear. The ceiling, of which the central section is flat and the sides and ends are angled, is also boarded and painted pale green.

The two driveways intersect at one side of the main house and continue to form a carriage loop in front of the house. At the intersection, near the billiards room is an immense fig tree. The carriage loop extends to the fence line on the opposite side of the house, where views extend to the range.

A fence also runs parallel to the front of the house and incorporates an early gate. Beyond this is a pagoda and another outbuilding, with recent additions.

The main house is surrounded by mature plantings including jacarandas, bunya pines, palms and figs. In the centre of the carriage loop is a circular grassed area with a standard rose in the centre, and to one side is a circular rose garden. On the opposite end of the house to the entrance is a grassed terrace with new plantings around the edges. At one end are large pines which flank a set of stone steps.

The principal house faces north and comprises the long and low-set section at the front, with the original kitchen and additions extending at the rear to form a "U" shape. The front section was originally encircled with open verandahs, and although much of these have been enclosed, they are still evident through the retention of verandah posts and the varied pitch of the ceilings. The front or northern face has an open verandah, which is enclosed on either side.

Access to the house is via a set of low, wide steps which are centrally located and lead to the verandah. The verandah roof is separate from the main roof and is supported by a series of double posts with simply designed collars and fascias. The verandah projects outward at either end, which coincides with gable roofs running at right angles to the main roof line. Brick chimneys with terracotta stacks are located at either end of the main roof, and a small triangular pediment is incorporated into the verandah roof over the entrance steps.

The main entrance door is of cedar with side and fan lights and is flanked by four sets of French doors on either side. The entrance opens into a vestibule from which access is gained through a plaster archway to a hallway beyond. Cedar doors open into large rooms on either side of the vestibule. The hallway runs the length of the house and opens into large rooms at either end. All of these rooms have substantial timber cornices, of varying designs, plaster or metal ceiling roses, cedar joinery and marble or timber fireplaces, also of varying designs and colour. French doors allow access, both to the front open verandah, and in the case of the end rooms, to the enclosed side verandahs. The side verandahs are enclosed with leadlight windows which pivot from the upper and lower edges.

Behind the southern end of the house is a substantial ballroom with a decorative plaster ceiling and walk-through windows at either end. These open onto a grassed terrace at the southern end and an enclosed verandah at the opposite end. Extending along the long axis of the ballroom is a hallway with a timber archway at one end and a doorway at the other, which also leads to the grassed terrace. From this hallway opens three rooms, of which the southern one is the largest and incorporates a bay window. These three rooms have French doors which open onto a simple verandah. A bathroom is located at the end of the verandah.

The earliest part of the house is the kitchen wing at the rear which is constructed of red bricks. The rear verandah is partially enclosed and lined with plasterboard and now operates as a laundry. Fireplaces and brick ovens remain on either side of a wall which divides the space into two rooms. This section is connected to the principal building by enclosed verandahs. An early verandah post below box guttering remains in this room, as do a series of bells, mounted on what would have been an external wall.

== Current Use ==
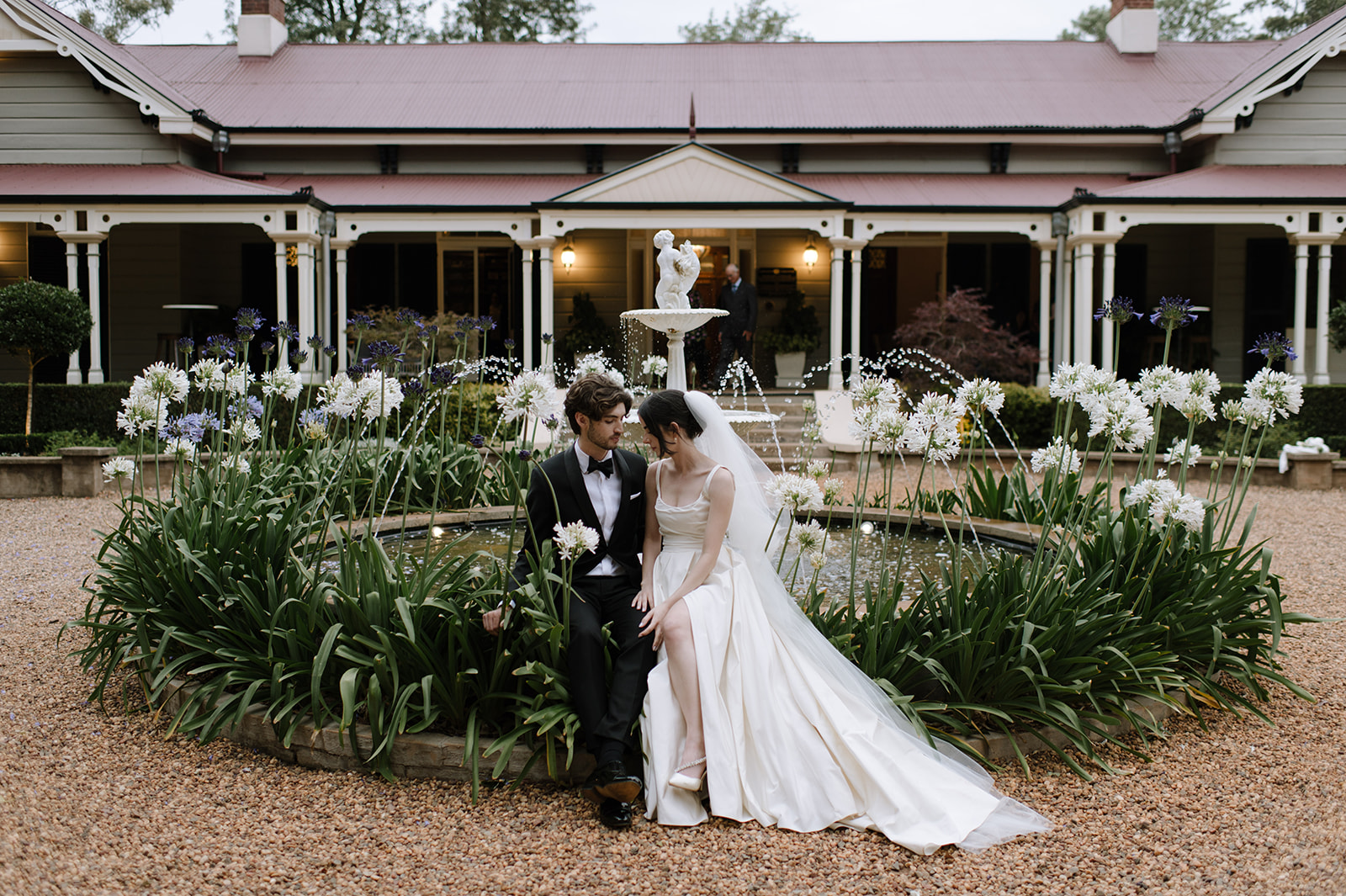
Gabbinbar as a modern wedding venue, 2024

From 2012, Gabbinbar Homestead and its gardens have been used for weddings. Within the Gabbinbar Homestead there are a number of the original rooms which still retain their period features. The conservatory has a glass ceiling which creates a light-filled room which is used for wedding receptions.

== Heritage listing ==
Gabbinbar was listed on the Queensland Heritage Register on 21 October 1992 having satisfied the following criteria.

The place is important in demonstrating the evolution or pattern of Queensland's history.

Gabbinbar demonstrates the pattern of Queensland's history by following the pattern of the construction of substantial houses on the Downs by the "Pure Merinos" which came to be used as summer resorts by the various Governors. It is also demonstrative of the development of the Darling Downs from a sparsely populated pastoral region to one of prosperity.

The place has potential to yield information that will contribute to an understanding of Queensland's history.

Due to the early date of the place, and its relative intactness, the potential exists for further historical and archaeological research which may yield additional information about the site.

The place is important in demonstrating the principal characteristics of a particular class of cultural places.

The place demonstrates the principal characteristics of its class through the inclusion of substantial entertaining rooms, associated outbuildings and extravagance of design and materials.

The place is important because of its aesthetic significance.

It has immense aesthetic significance due to the siting of the buildings in a semi-rural, picturesque environment. The main house has significant architectural merit due to its high degree of materials, detailing and finishes, both internally and externally. Other building are also aesthetically significant, both for their individual merit and for their complementary association with the main house.

The place has a strong or special association with a particular community or cultural group for social, cultural or spiritual reasons.

Gabbinbar has special association with the community of Toowoomba as a well-known early residence and summer resort of the Governors of Queensland. It also has a strong association with the 2/1st Corps Field Survey Company, AIF as a base during the Second World War, who recently held a reunion at the house.

The place has a special association with the life or work of a particular person, group or organisation of importance in Queensland's history.

The principal section of Gabbinbar was constructed for The Reverend William Lambie Nelson in 1876. It was built as a substantial addition to the first brick house on the property, which is thought to have been constructed c. 1866.

Rev William Lambie Nelson was instrumental in the establishment of a Presbyterian Church in Toowoomba, having previously served in Ipswich. He also owned pastoral properties and purchased the 100 acres (40 ha) on which Gabbinbar was located after passing through the area in the early 1860s.

The place is also associated with Willoughby Powell and Richard Godsall, architect and builder respectively of the 1876 section, and with James Marks, architect of the southern extension. It also has special association with early Presbyterian and political family, the Nelsons whose direct descendants resided at Gabbinbar until 1970, and with the Governor of Queensland, Lord Chelmsford, who used the place as a summer resort from 1906 to 1909.
