= Willoughby Powell =

Australian architect

- Born: England
- Occupation: architect
- Years active: 1875–1900
- Employer: Richard Gailey (1872–1874, 1885–1893)
- Notable work: Toowoomba Grammar School; Gabbinbar Homestead; Wesley Uniting Church, Toowoomba; Baddow House; Mortuary Chapel, Maryborough Cemetery; Atkinson & Powell Building; Warwick Town Hall

Willoughby Powell was an architect in Queensland, Australia. Some of his works are now heritage-listed.

== Early life ==
Willoughby Powell was born in England.

== Architectural career ==
Powell trained as an architect in Cheltenham, England. In 1872 he emigrated to Australia with his brother and worked for Richard Gailey in Brisbane before joining the Queensland Works Department in 1874. After winning a design competition for the Toowoomba Grammar School he set up a practice there between 1875 and 1877. After travelling to England in 1878 he worked again for Gailey before moving to Maryborough to supervise his own work between 1882 and 1885. He then returned to Gailey in Brisbane until 1893 when the financial crash saw the bottom drop out of the building trade. His own design work seems to have largely been for churches, public buildings and large houses.

== Significant works ==
Buildings designed by Powell include:

- 1875: Toowoomba Grammar School
- 1876: Gabbinbar Homestead
- 1877: Wesley Uniting Church, Toowoomba
- 1883: Baddow House
- 1883: Mortuary Chapel, Maryborough Cemetery
- 1887: Atkinson & Powell Building is his only work in North Queensland, one of very few shops known to have been designed by him.
- 1887: Warwick Town Hall
- 1900: Toowoomba City Hall
Buildings designed by Powell
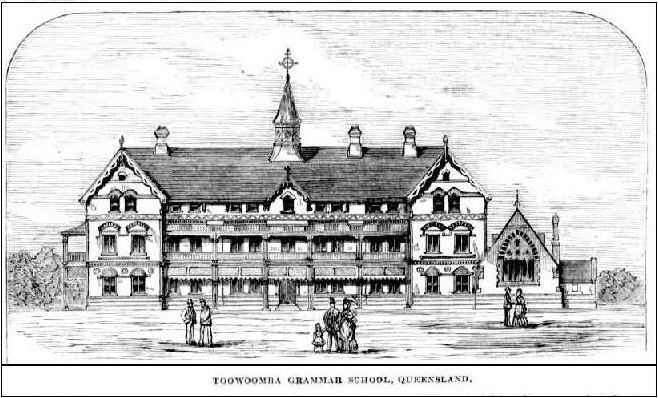
Toowoomba Grammar School.

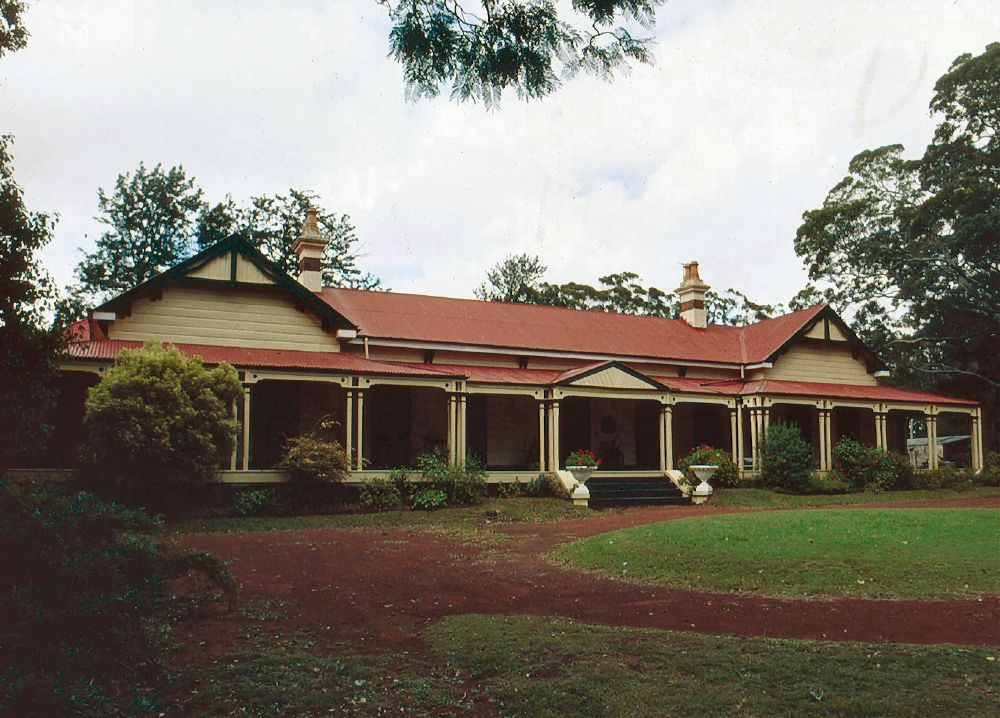
Gabbinbar Homestead.

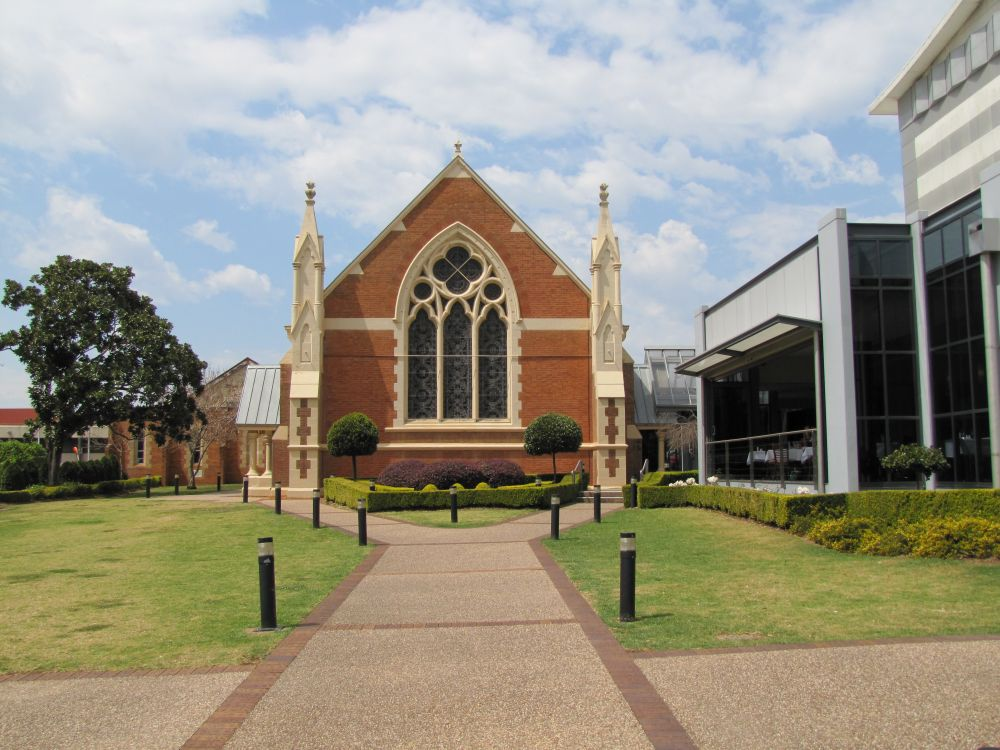
Wesley Uniting Church.

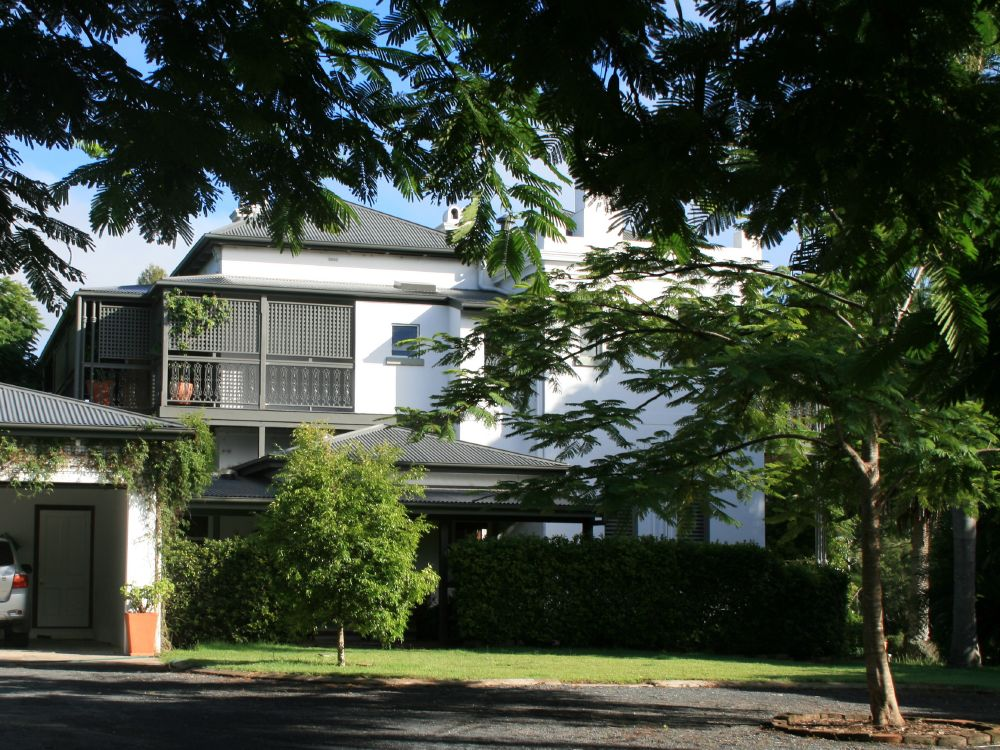
Baddow House.

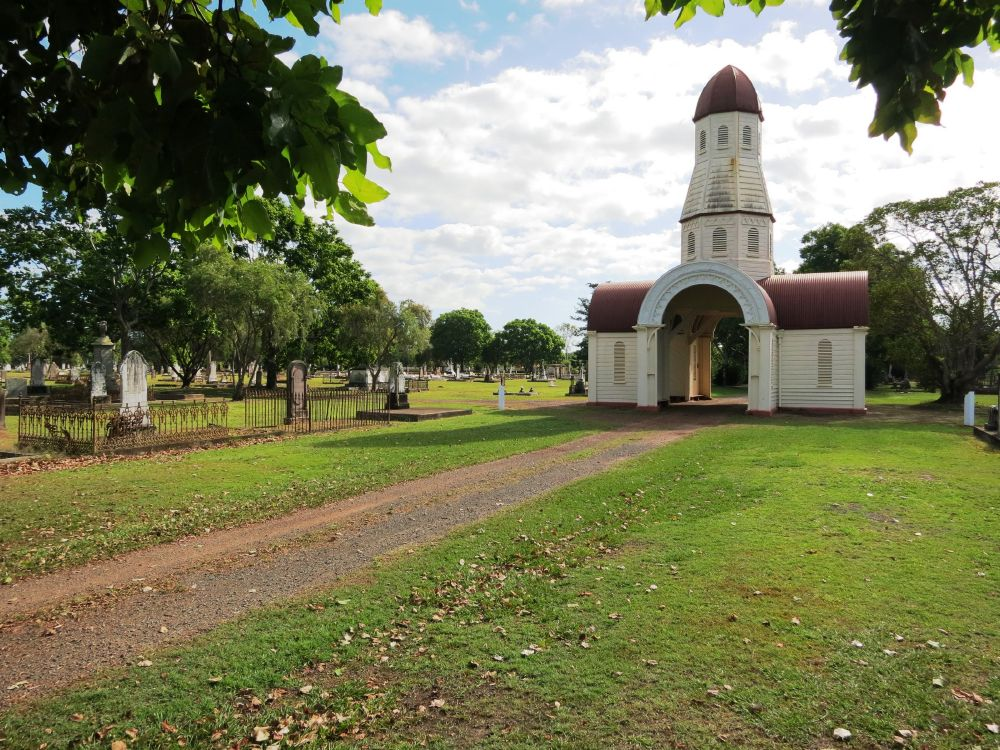
Mortuary Chapel, Maryborough Cemetery.

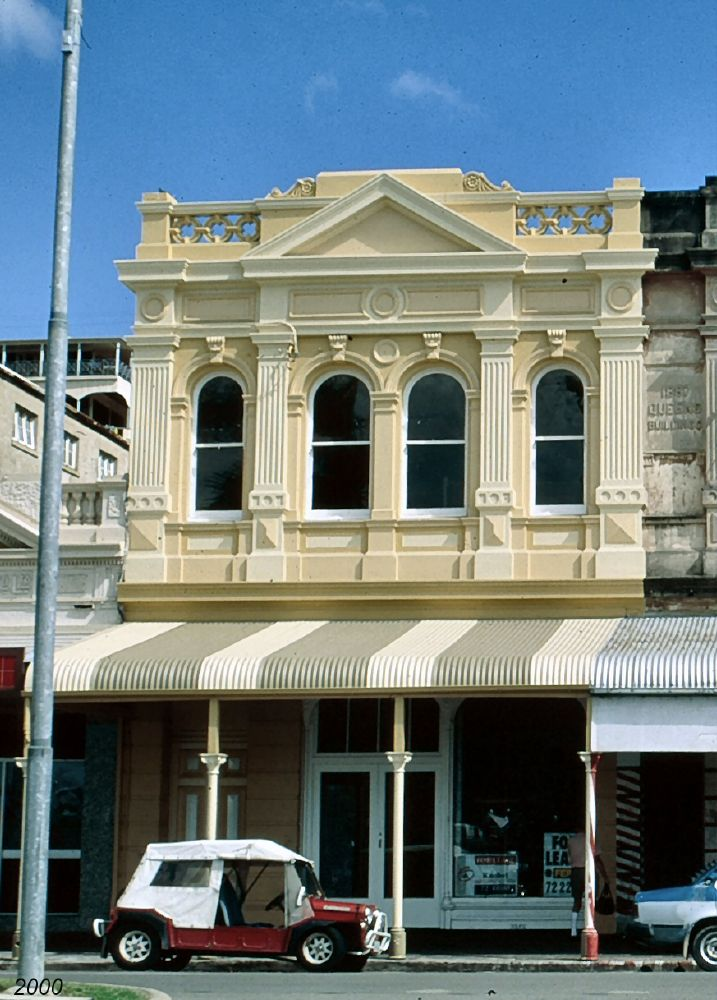
Atkinson & Powell Building.

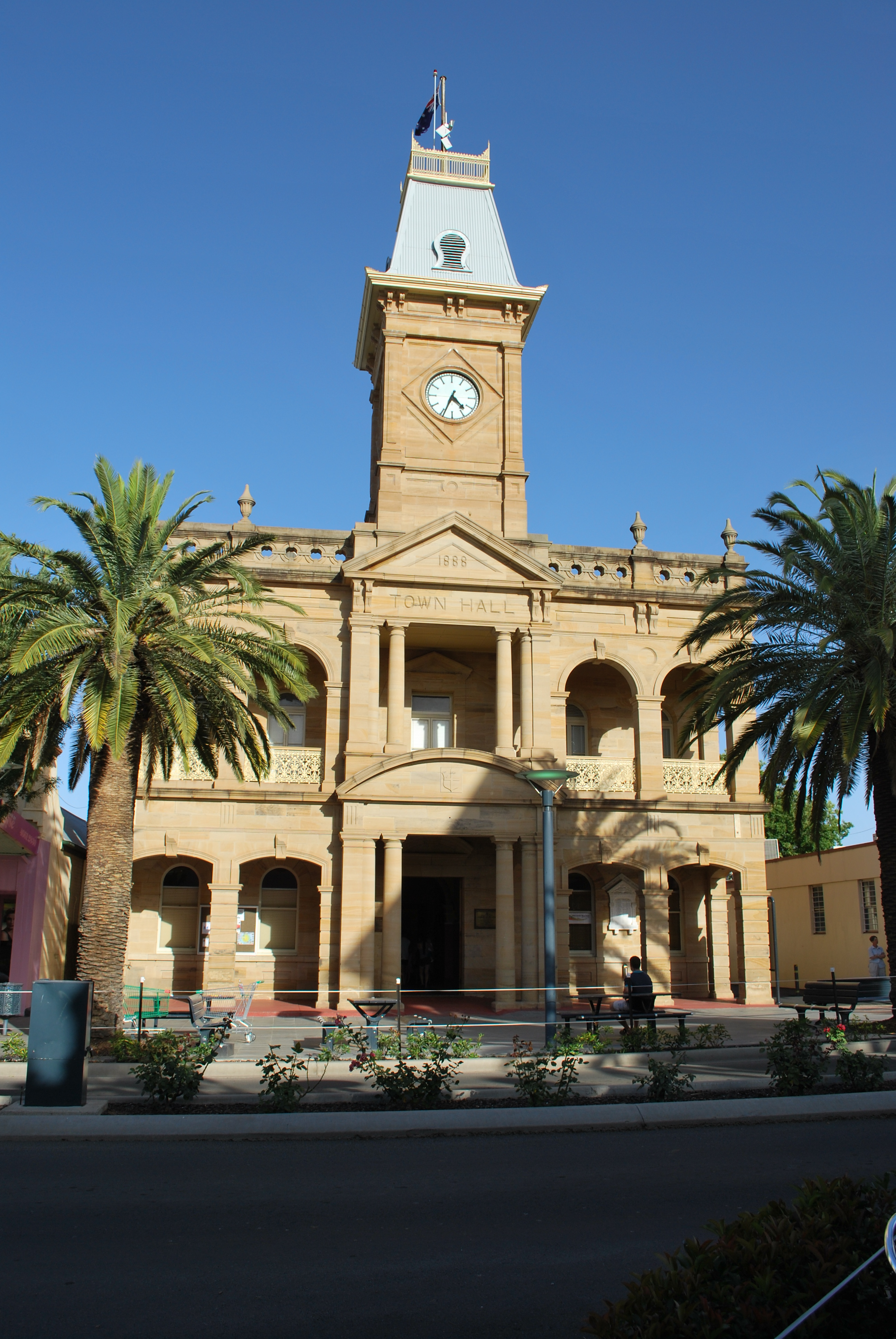
Warwick Town Hall.

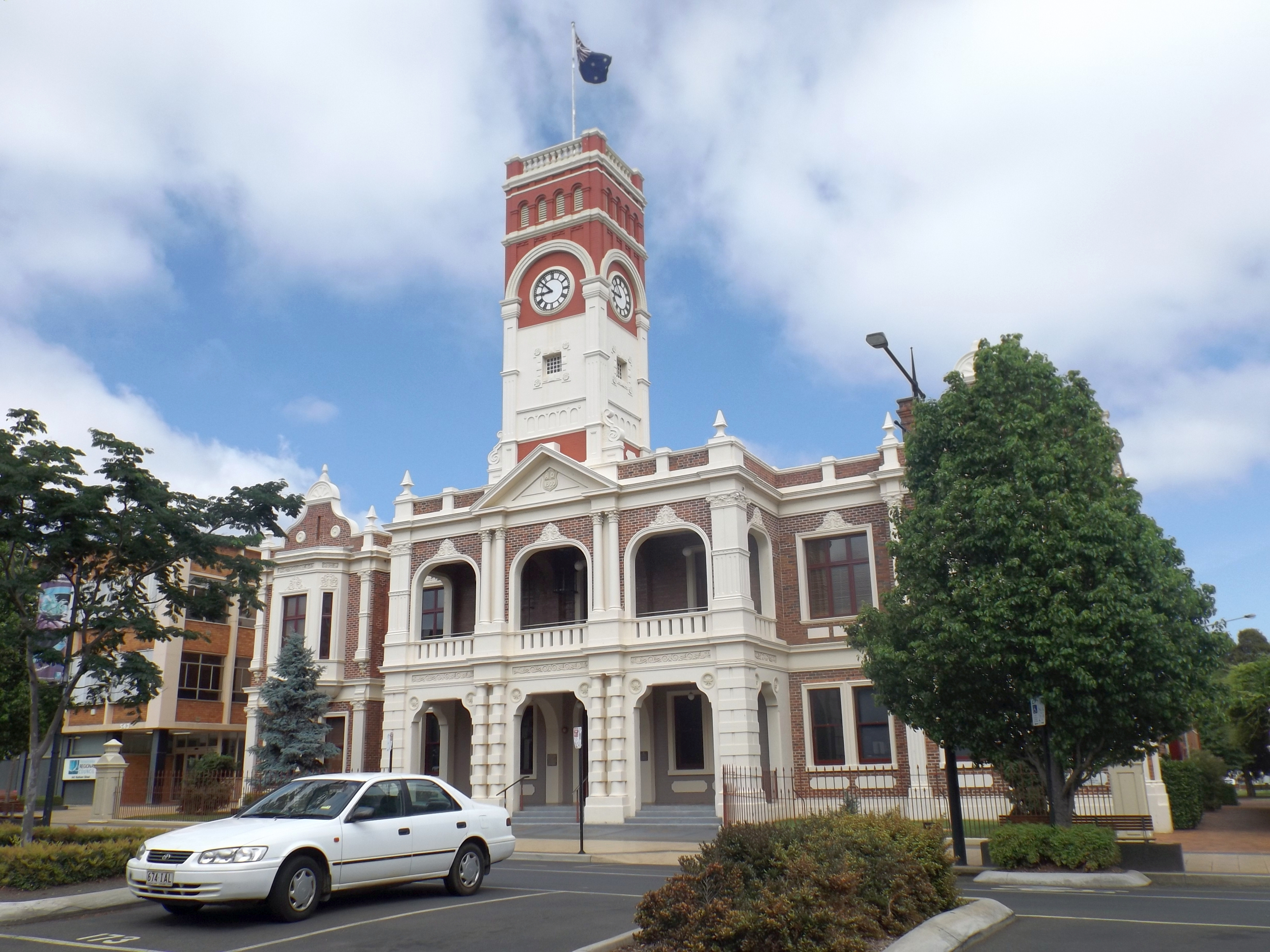
Toowoomba City Hall.
