= Geoffrey Saba =

Australian classical pianist

Geoffrey Saba (born 1946) is an Australian classical pianist of Lebanese descent, based in London.

Saba was born in Toowoomba, Queensland, where his parents established a well-known haberdashery store. He attended Toowoomba Grammar School. He was awarded the University of Queensland Music Scholarship for 1963, and chose to take it at the University of Melbourne Conservatorium of Music.

After graduating, he moved to London in the late 1960s, and has resided there ever since. He has worked with Stefan Askenase and Vlado Perlemuter.

He was one of the competitors awarded a bronze medal at the First Arthur Rubinstein International Piano Master Competition in 1974.

He tours in North America, Europe, the Middle East, India, Japan, South East Asia and Australia.

In its facsimile edition of Franz Schubert's C major Sonata, Relique, D.840, the International Franz Schubert Institute, Vienna, published Saba's essay on a performer's approach to playing Schubert's unfinished piano sonatas.
