= Hugh Rose (rugby union) =

Australian rugby union international

- Full name: Hugh Alexander Rose
- Born: 15 November 1946 (age 79) Walcha, NSW, Australia

Rugby union career
- Position: Flanker / No. 8
International career
Years	Team	Apps	(Points)
1967–70	Australia	13	(0)

Hugh Alexander Rose (born 15 November 1946) is an Australian former rugby union international.

Born in Walcha, Rose played Australian rules football growing up in country New South Wales. While boarding at The King's School in Sydney, Rose picked up rugby union and had three years in the 1st XV.

Rose attended the University of New England, playing rugby for Robb College.

A back-row forward, Rose debuted for New South Wales in 1966 and the following year earned his first Wallabies cap against Ireland at the Sydney Cricket Ground. He was capped 13 times for the Wallabies, without missing a Test.

Rose was the Headmaster of Toowoomba Grammar School from 1992 to 2002.

== See also ==
- List of Australia national rugby union players
