= Fernside, Toowoomba =

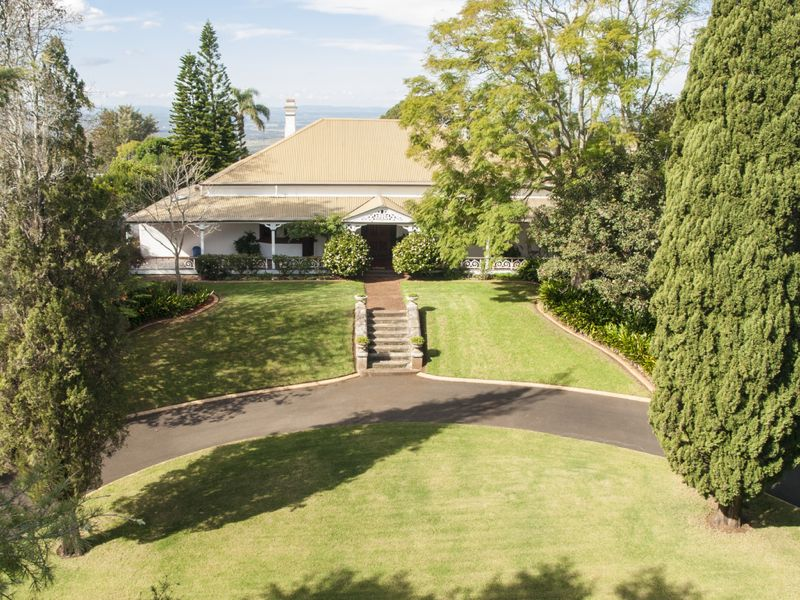
- Fernside, 2015

- Location within Queensland Location within Australia
- 27.5611°S 151.9752°E
- Location: 4–6 Fernside Street, East Toowoomba, Toowoomba, Toowoomba Region, Queensland, Australia

History
- Design period: 1870s–1890s (late 19th century)
- Built: c. 1876–c. 1915

Queensland Heritage Register
- Official name: Fernside
- Type: state heritage (built, landscape)
- Designated: 21 October 1992
- Reference no.: 600843
- Significant period: 1870s–1910s (fabric); 1870s–1890s (historical)
- Significant components: residential accommodation – main house, trees/plantings, garden/grounds, carriage way/drive, lawn/s, steps/stairway, views from

Fernside is a heritage-listed villa at 4–6 Fernside Street, East Toowoomba, Toowoomba, Toowoomba Region, Queensland, Australia. It was built from c. 1876 to c. 1915. It was added to the Queensland Heritage Register on 21 October 1992.

== History ==
Fernside, a low symmetrical brick building, was built c. 1876 for John Alexander Boyce who arrived in Toowoomba from Brisbane in August 1870.

From the mid-1870s, JA Boyce accumulated land around what are now Fernside, Arthur and Curzon Streets, including the transferral of two acres on 1 July 1876 and a further two acres on 20 August 1877.

JA Boyce was Clerk of Petty Sessions in Toowoomba from 1870 until at least 1893. In 1895, Boyce was appointed relieving Police Magistrate in Winton and in 1896 was stationed at Thargomindah and Muttaburra. Boyce travelled further afield in later years, holding positions at Barcaldine, Roma and Cunnamulla from 1897 and was appointed Police Magistrate at Townsville in 1903. In 1909, Boyce retired to Sandgate and died in 1927. His obituary was placed in the Brisbane Courier on 8 December 1927.

The house remained in the Boyce family for over 100 years, six generations of the family living there over the period of time, from William Boyce, father of JA Boyce to Lesley Anne, Colin, Rodney and Michael, the children of Peter Boyce, JA Boyce's great grandson.

JA Boyce sold Fernside to his daughter-in-law, Margaret Annie Griffiths, in February 1902. Annie owned it until she died in 1969, aged 100 years. Annie Griffiths was the daughter of George Washington Griffiths who established the Toowoomba Foundry in 1871. The Brisbane Courier reports on 8 June 1886 that "three or four years after starting, Mr [George W] Griffiths took in his brother and brother-in- law to the business." At this time the Foundry was known as Griffith Bros and Company, later, c. 1884, the name was changed to the Toowoomba Foundry Company Limited.

Annie married Gerard Boyce, JA Boyce's son in Toowoomba on 21 May 1896. News of the couple's marriage was printed in the Toowoomba Chronicle on 4 June 1896. Annie Boyce took out a mortgage on the property in 1915, it is likely that renovations to the eastern elevation were undertaken at this time. By 1955, the street was known as Fernside Street, having been formerly known as Curzon Street.

After Annie's death, Fernside passed to her grandson, Peter Boyce, who owned the property until 1978. In 1978, Fernside was sold to people outside the Boyce family. The current owners have resided at Fernside since 1993.

The grandeur and position of the house were recognised as desirable from very early on. Sir Arthur Kennedy, Governor of Queensland from 1877 to 1883, used the house as his summer residence. The use of the residence as a summer retreat for the governor continued the trend of using several Toowoomba residences in this manner. Harlaxton House was rented by Lord Lamington, the eighth governor of Queensland (1896–1901). From 1906 to 1909, Gabbinbar was used as a place of summer residence by Lord Chelmsford, Governor of Queensland from 1905 to 1909. Vernon Redwood, Mayor of Toowoomba, MLA, rented Fernside in the early part of this century, as did other Toowoomba notables.

== Description ==
Fernside is built on a levelled area rising from Fernside Street to the west, the levelled area falls away to an escarpment to the east. The siting of Fernside provides views from the Great Dividing Range to the east. Fernside's well established garden setting incorporates a carriage drive located at the front, or western side of the house and native and exotic conifers.

The house is a low, symmetrical, rendered brick building, with a hipped roof clad with colourbond sheeting and gutters. The house has verandahs, under a separate roof, located on the western and eastern sides. Two moulded, rendered brick chimneys are located at the northern and southern elevations of the house. The original section of Fernside was constructed c. 1876 with several additions at later stages, including an enclosed verandah along northern elevation, a bay window and dormer window added to the eastern elevation, possibly c. 1915 and an extension to the southern elevation during the 1990s.

The western elevation, the facade to Fernside Street, faces the carriageway, and is accessed via a set of wide concrete steps. The centred porticoed entrance, topped by a timber fretwork gable, supported by paired timber posts with timber brackets, leads to the front entrance, a timber panelled door, with sidelight and fanlight assemblies. Bay windows with simple timber architraves and a verandah rail with wrought iron balustrading, not originally from Fernside, are also located along the western elevation. A second panelled timber door, with sidelight and fanlight assemblies is located at the southern end of the western elevation.

The eastern elevation faces magnificent views from the Great Dividing Range. The verandah is supported by timber posts and brackets and the brick is marked out to resemble ashlar. The centred bay window with gabled roof has a French door and three sets of elongated windows with small square paned glass and breezeways. Two other timber, panelled French doors are located in the eastern facade. The dormer window is located to the north of the gabled bay window.

The northern elevation is timber framed and enclosed with glass windows and French doors, and houses service facilities. The southern elevation, extended during the 1990s, is timber framed with large windows with breezeway, French doors and a corrugated iron roof.

Internally, Fernside's core remains reasonably intact. Some original detail remains, including moulded pressed metal ceilings in the living and dining rooms. Fireplaces, one with moulded timber surrounds and another with marble surrounds and consoles, are situated in the living and dining rooms.

A number of doorways retain original cedar joinery including a door from the living room to the dining room which also has a breezeway with diamond shaped timber panels surrounded by decorative glass.

Fernside has a concrete fence with moulded concrete pillars with a non-original cast iron gate at the front.

== Heritage listing ==
Fernside was listed on the Queensland Heritage Register on 21 October 1992 having satisfied the following criteria.

The place is important in demonstrating the evolution or pattern of Queensland's history.

Fernside follows the pattern of the construction of substantial houses on the Darling Downs which came to be used as summer resorts by various Governors, demonstrating the development of the Darling Downs from a sparsely populated pastoral region to one of prosperity.

The place is important in demonstrating the principal characteristics of a particular class of cultural places.

Fernside is significant as an example of well-to-do domestic building from the 1870s, reflecting the wealth and status of a public servant in Toowoomba, a major regional centre in colonial Queensland.

The siting of the house and subsequent landscape works are highly significant. Its location and verandahed design provide spectacular views from the Great Dividing Range, demonstrating the importance of topography for early settlers when choosing a suitable site on which to build.

The place has a strong or special association with a particular community or cultural group for social, cultural or spiritual reasons.

Fernside has special association with the community of Toowoomba and surrounding area as a well-known early residence and summer resort of Sir Arthur Kennedy, Governor of Queensland from 1877 to 1883.

The place has a special association with the life or work of a particular person, group or organisation of importance in Queensland's history.

Fernside has special association with the community of Toowoomba and surrounding area as a well-known early residence and summer resort of Sir Arthur Kennedy, Governor of Queensland from 1877 to 1883.
