= Queens Building, Townsville =

Queens Building
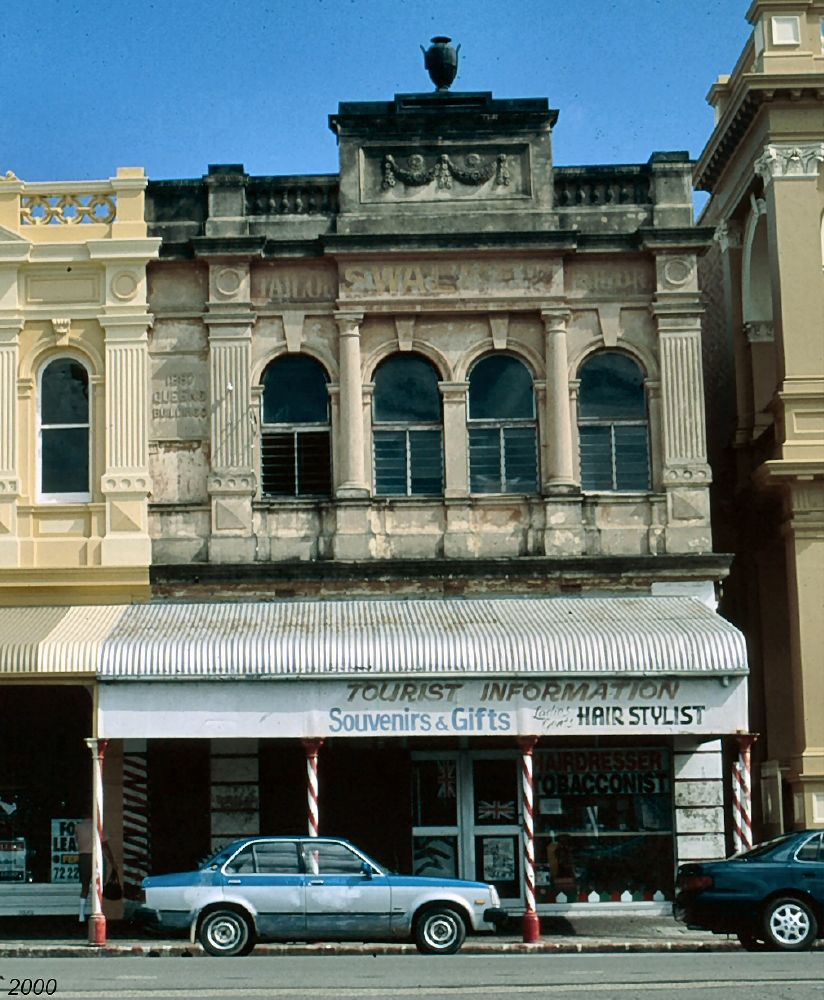
- Queens Building, 2000

- Location within Queensland Location within Australia
- 19.2572°S 146.8197°E
- Location: 175 Flinders Street, Townsville CBD, City of Townsville, Queensland, Australia

History
- Design period: 1870s–1890s (late 19th century)
- Built: c. 1887

Site notes
- Architect: Tunbridge & Tunbridge
- Architectural style: Classicism

Queensland Heritage Register
- Official name: Queens Building
- Type: state heritage (built)
- Designated: 21 October 1992
- Reference no.: 600896
- Significant period: 1880s (fabric) c. 1887–ongoing (historical use)

Queens Building is a heritage-listed shopping centre at 175 Flinders Street, Townsville CBD, City of Townsville, Queensland, Australia. It was designed by Tunbridge & Tunbridge and built c. 1887. It was added to the Queensland Heritage Register on 21 October 1992.

== History ==
Queen's Building was designed in 1887 by Tunbridge and Tunbridge for the chemist Pio Armati, and named in honour of Queen Victoria's Jubilee year.

Townsville was established in 1864 by partners John Melton Black and Robert Towns and was gazetted as a port of entry in 1865. It grew quickly as a supply centre and by 1873 the port was receiving international as well as coastal traffic. Improvements were carried out to port facilities to allow larger ships to anchor. By 1880 Townsville was the port for several major goldfields and had opened the first stage of the Great Northern railway line westwards through Charters Towers and beyond, consolidating its importance as a port and mercantile centre.

Pio Armati was one of the earliest Italian settlers in North Queensland. Born near Rome, he immigrated to Australia in 1874 as a young man and was naturalised in 1876. He entered into partnership with Chiafredo Venerando Fraire in the 1870s. Fraire had also immigrated in 1874 and both men, particularly Fraire, were to assume an important role in encouraging and promoting Italian Immigration to North Queensland. The firm of Armati Fraire and Company were drapers, ironmongers, wine sellers and general merchants. In 1878 Armati acquired the land on which this building stands and appears to have had a shop at this address. The firm were successful and in 1881 Fraire bought the retail drapery section of Burns Philp. When the Queen's Building was constructed they ran a drapery business, but in 1889 the partnership was dissolved. Armati ran an insurance agency at this address and Fraire alone is listed as a draper by 1890. By 1892 Armati had a chemist shop at another Flinders Street address and continued in this trade for many years. He became the leading pharmacist in Townsville and was socially prominent. He died in 1923. Both Armati and Fraire have streets named after them in Townsville.

The building was constructed to the design of the newly established local architectural firm of Tunbridge and Tunbridge. Walter Howard Tunbridge was born and trained in England as an architect. In 1884 he migrated to Australia and worked for Rooney Bros in Townsville. He left to establish his own practice in 1886 and invited his younger brother, Oliver, to join him in 1887. This partnership subsequently became an important architectural and civil engineering firm in North Queensland. Their design complemented the adjacent Atkinson & Powell Building, constructed in 1886, having several design features in common.

The Queen's Building has been occupied as shops and offices. Tenants have included an accountant, architect and surveyor, watchmaker, jeweller and tailor. The North Queensland Mortgage and Investment Company held a lease from 1906 to 1931. In 1940 the property was sold to Peter Phillips and was subdivided in 1957. It was purchased by the current owner and has been used as a hairdresser's and gift store since 1973.

The building has been altered on the ground floor and has aluminium framed windows and doors. On the upper level the main change has been the partial replacement of window glazing with louvres.

== Description ==
Queen's Building is located on the main commercial street of Townsville and is a two storey, brick building closely matching in style, though differing in decoration, the former Atkinson and Powell Building adjoining it.

The Queen's Building is rendered on the street elevation and has classically influenced moulded decoration. The upper floor has four round headed windows with prominent voussoirs, separated by pilasters. Above this is an entablature and balustraded parapet. The central section is raised and has a tablet decorated by swags and topped by a draped urn. This conceals a hipped roof clad with corrugated iron. There are glass louvres fitted into the lower section of the windows. Early signage is visible on the entablature.

Below a cornice, a bullnosed corrugated iron awning shades the shopfront. It is supported on cast iron columns, but the cast iron frieze to the awning does not survive. The shop fronts have been modernised and have aluminium framed windows and doors with panels of glass louvres above. There is a separate entrance to the upper level on the western side between the shopfronts of the Queen's building and the former Atkinson and Powell building which it abuts.

== Heritage listing ==
Queens Building was listed on the Queensland Heritage Register on 21 October 1992 having satisfied the following criteria.

The place is important in demonstrating the evolution or pattern of Queensland's history.

The style and quality of the Queen's Building illustrates the boom period of Townsville in the 1880s when Flinders Street was being redeveloped with substantial buildings. This prosperity reflects the way in which North Queensland was developed by the establishment of key ports as commercial and administrative centres.

The place is important in demonstrating the principal characteristics of a particular class of cultural places.

The Queen's Building is important as an example of a small scale but good quality commercial century office building of its era in North Queensland.

The place is important because of its aesthetic significance.

It is located on the major commercial street of Townsville where, by its design, form and materials, it is a substantial visual component of the built character of the city.

The place has a special association with the life or work of a particular person, group or organisation of importance in Queensland's history.

The building is associated with the life and work of Pio Vico Armati, one of the earliest Italian settlers in North Queensland and a well-known figure in Townsville. It is also an example of the commercial work of the important North Queensland architectural firm of Tunbridge and Tunbridge.
