= Toowoomba Grammar School =

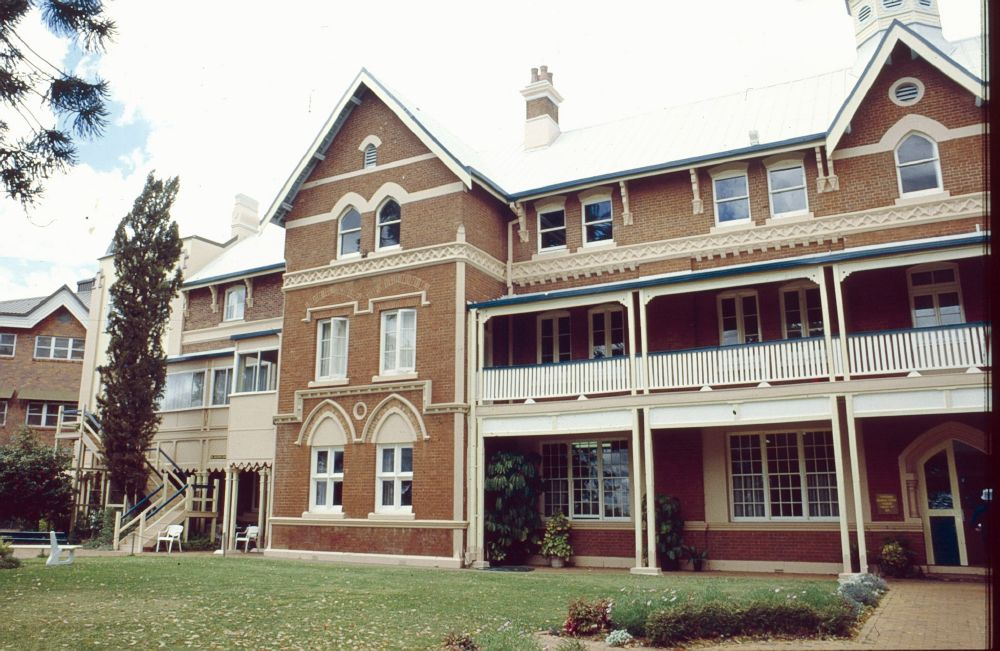

Location
- Toowoomba, Queensland; Australia; 27°33′54″S 151°58′5″E

Information
- Type: Independent, day & boarding
- Motto: Latin: Fidelis in Omnibus (Faithful in All Things)
- Denomination: Non-denominational
- Established: 1875
- Headmaster: Dr John Kinniburgh
- Grades: P–12
- Gender: Boys
- Enrolment: ~1150
- Colours: Blue and gold, formerly blue and white
- Slogan: A quality education designed for boys
- Alumni: TGS Old Boys
- Website: www.twgs.qld.edu.au

Toowoomba Grammar School is an independent, non-denominational, day and boarding grammar school for boys, in East Toowoomba, Toowoomba, Toowoomba Region, Queensland, Australia.

Toowoomba Grammar was established in 1875, the third school to be established under the Grammar Schools Act 1860. It has a non-selective enrolment policy and currently caters for approximately 1,169 students from Prep to Year 12, including 300 boarders from Years 5 to 12.

Some of the Toowoomba Grammar School buildings are listed on the Queensland Heritage Register.

== History ==
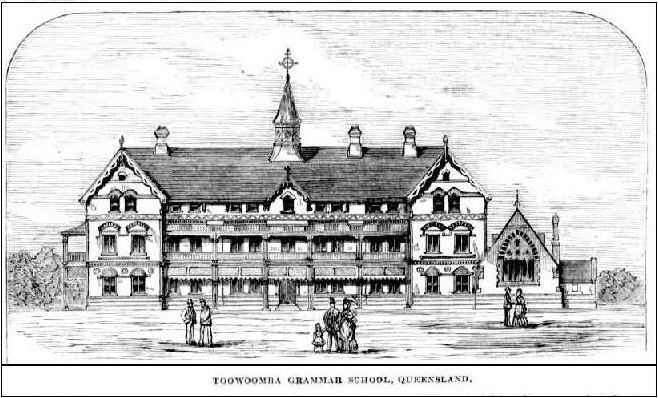
Toowoomba Grammar School, sketch prior to construction, 1875

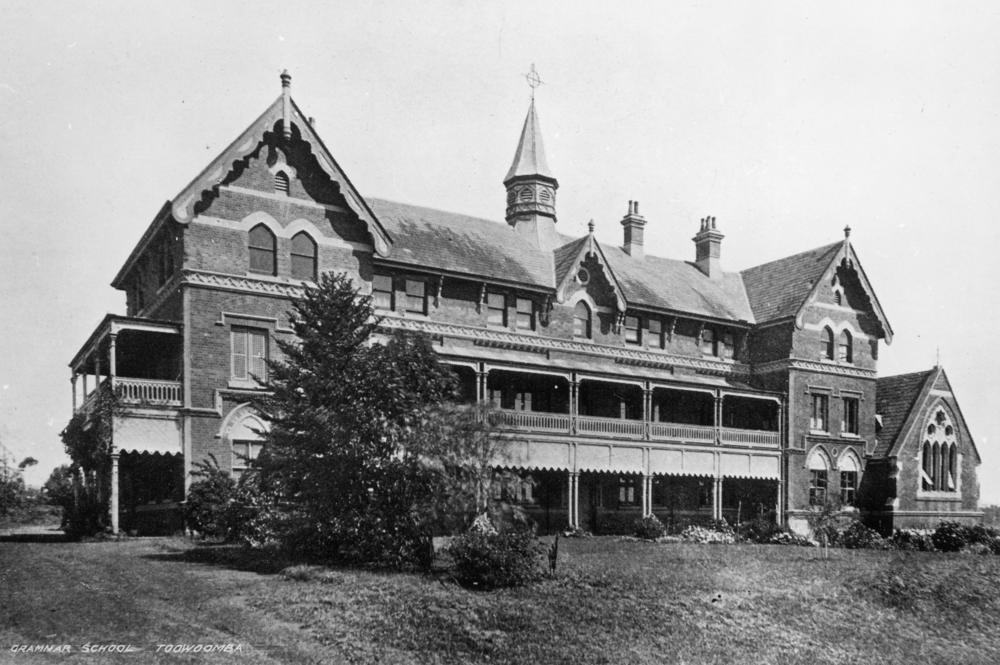
Main school building, circa 1902

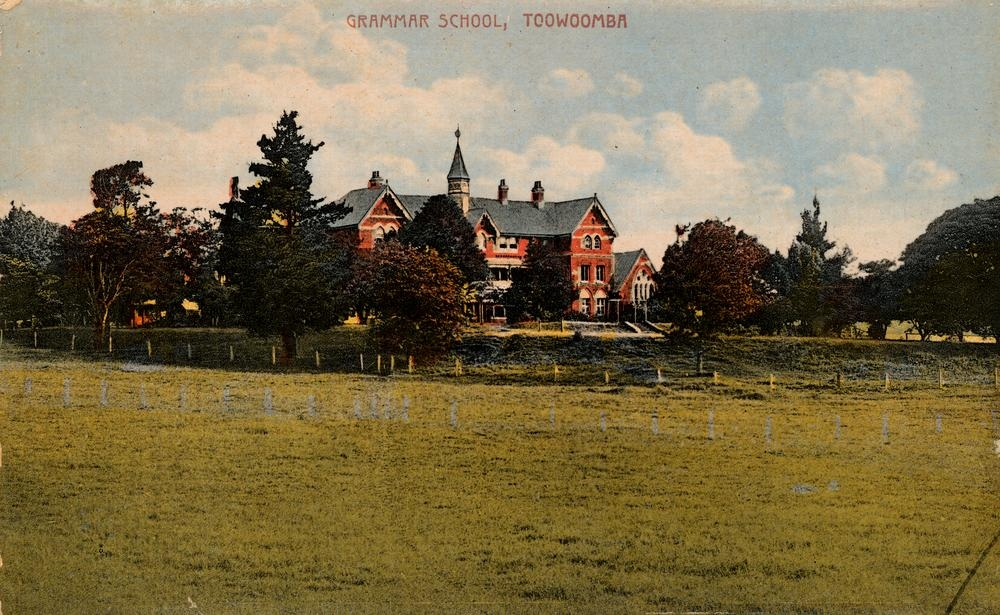
Hand coloured postcard of the main school building

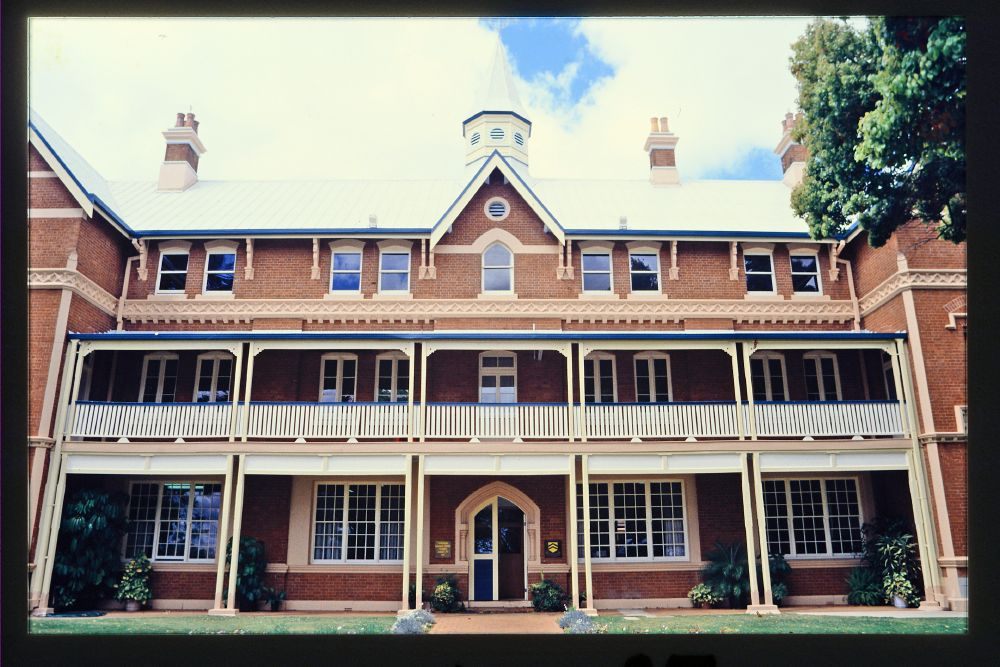
Main school building, 1994

The school was founded in 1875 as a consequence of the Grammar Schools Act of 1860 passed by Queensland's first parliament. The original building was designed by Willoughby Powell. The foundation stone was laid on 5 August 1875; it was to be laid by the Governor of Queensland, William Cairns but due to his illness, Justice Charles Lilley performed the ceremony. A bottle (time capsule) was placed in a cavity in the stone containing two local newspapers, coins of the realm and a parchment commemorating the event and listing the names of the foundation trustees:

- James Taylor, Member of the Queensland Legislative Council (treasurer)
- S. G. Stephens (secretary)
- G. H. Davenport
- John Frederick McDougall, Member of the Queensland Legislative Council
- William Graham, Member of the Queensland Legislative Assembly for Darling Downs
- Edward Wilmot Pechey, Member of the Queensland Legislative Assembly for Aubigny
- G. W. Elliott, P.M.
- James Bubbered

the architect and contractor:

- Willoughby Powell (architect)
- John Garget (contractor)

and the aldermen of Toowoomba:

- Robert Aland (mayor)
- John Garget
- James Campbell
- Daniel Donavon
- Henry Spiro
- Malcolm Geddes
- Richard Godsall
- R. J. Barry
- J. Reuter

The building was completed in 1876. It was officially opened on Thursday 1 February 1877.

== Affiliations ==
The school has been a member of the Great Public Schools' Association Inc (GPS) since 1920. It is also affiliated with the Australian Boarding Schools Association (ABSA), the Association of Heads of Independent Schools of Australia (AHISA), the Junior School Heads Association of Australia (JSHAA), and Independent Schools Queensland (ISQ).

== Curriculum ==
The school uses the Queensland Curriculum throughout its education with the school broken down into two categories:

- Junior School (Prep – Year 6)
- Senior School (Year 7 – Year 12)

Students from Junior have set subjects which are decided upon by the class teacher whilst students who are in Year 7 and 8 move between classes and are exposed to various subject selections the school offers. During Year 9, a student can select three of their eight subjects as electives, while in Year 11, they are allowed to choose four electives and select their strands in their core subjects.

== Houses ==
Taylor House – Taylor House was named in honour of the Hon. James Taylor, the first chairman of the board of trustees at the school. In the first colonial parliament, he represented the Western Downs in the Legislative Council and then later as Mayor of Toowoomba. He was well known for his contributions to the Benevolent Society and the hospital, as well as being the first president of the School of Arts and his promotion of the foundation of the Darling Downs Agriculture Society. As well as Active Development of the Clifford Park Race Way.

Prior to 1992, Taylor House was the boarding house for the year-nine students at the school, and in 2004 combined with Gibson House to form a combined day/boarding house. This boarding house is the smallest of the six currently on campus with plans for a new boarding house to be situated on the Parents and Friends' Oval, and the boarding house be renovated into the new "Engineering and Vocational Training Centre". The House's colour is black.

Boyce House – Boyce House takes its name from an old boy of the school, Mr Leslie Atherton George Boyce. Mr Boyce entered the school in 1911 as a Scholar of the State. In 1915 he entered the AIF and served in France, later to be wounded in 1917 and hence awarded the Military Cross for "conspicuous gallantry and devotion to duty when in command of his platoon during an attack". On returning to Toowoomba, he became the chief executive officer of the Toowoomba Foundry, remaining as the Director until 1976.

Prior to 1992, Boyce House was home to Year 10 students and in 2004 along with the other houses was amalgamated with Henderson. The boarding house exists next to the Margaret School entrance and is planned to be renovated into the "Culture Centre" focusing on all walks of artistic excellence on campus. With a new boarding house to be constructed alongside the new Taylor Boarding House. Within the boarding house it maintains four internal dormitories, these being Woodward, Fortescue, Robertson, and Clownes in Honour of famous Old Boys who gave their lives in the Great War and World War II. The house's Colour is Maroon.

Mackintosh House – Mackintosh House is the oldest of the schools houses, and is named after the school's inaugural headmaster, Mr John Mackintosh, who was appointed as headmaster in 1876. Born in Scotland in 1836, he excelled academically at Edinburgh University before sailing to Australia in 1861. He became immortalised at the school after he was killed when he was thrown from his horse while on a riding expedition to Helidon below the range.

Mackintosh House was the home to the Year 12 boys prior to 1992, and in 2004 merged with Chauvel to form its combined house. It was originally situated in the two upper floors of the school's original building. In 2011 the decision was made to move them out of this facility and renovate it to Staff Offices. As a result of this, the Mackintosh House is situated in the newest boarding house on campus. Located in between the existing Taylor and Boyce Houses. The house's colour is red.

Groom House – Groom House holds the highest prestige after being named after Sir Littleton Groom. In 1901 Sir Littleton was elected as the first federal representative of the seat of Groom (named after him, although he held the seat of Darling Downs) and later the first speaker of the house. He then held this seat for 36 years. Sir Littleton is listed on the Old Boys' Wall of Achievement.

Prior to 1992, Groom House was home to Year 8s, and was merged with Freshney in 2004. The boarding house from Groom House is currently located on the lower floor of the original Stephens House (which was originally a two-story boarding house) when the Junior School occupied its original boarding house to create Corfe House. This boarding facility is located on the Herries Street side of the campus and is in a traditional red brick construction. It is one of few boarding houses where the boarding housemaster lives in the building itself and not a separate detached building. The house's colour is green.

Stephens House – Stephens House was named after the undisputed founder of Toowoomba Grammar School Mr Samuel George Stephens. Mr Stephens was born in Wales and having been educated at the School for Captains' Sons, joined the Merchant Navy. On one of his adventures, the ship was wrecked on the Victorian Coast near Melbourne. He eventually moved to Toowoomba where he and his wife built a house in Herries Street, where he then raised six daughters. He was the honorary secretary of the first board of trustees, and his oldest son Alfred was the first boy to be enrolled at the school.

Prior to 1992, Stephens House was the home for Year 11 students, and further in 2004 was merged with the Day House Partridge to form a combined house. Located in the same boarding house as Groom House, Stephens House also has a boarding house master that lives inside the boarding house rather than a detached building. The house's colour is royal blue.

== Headmasters ==
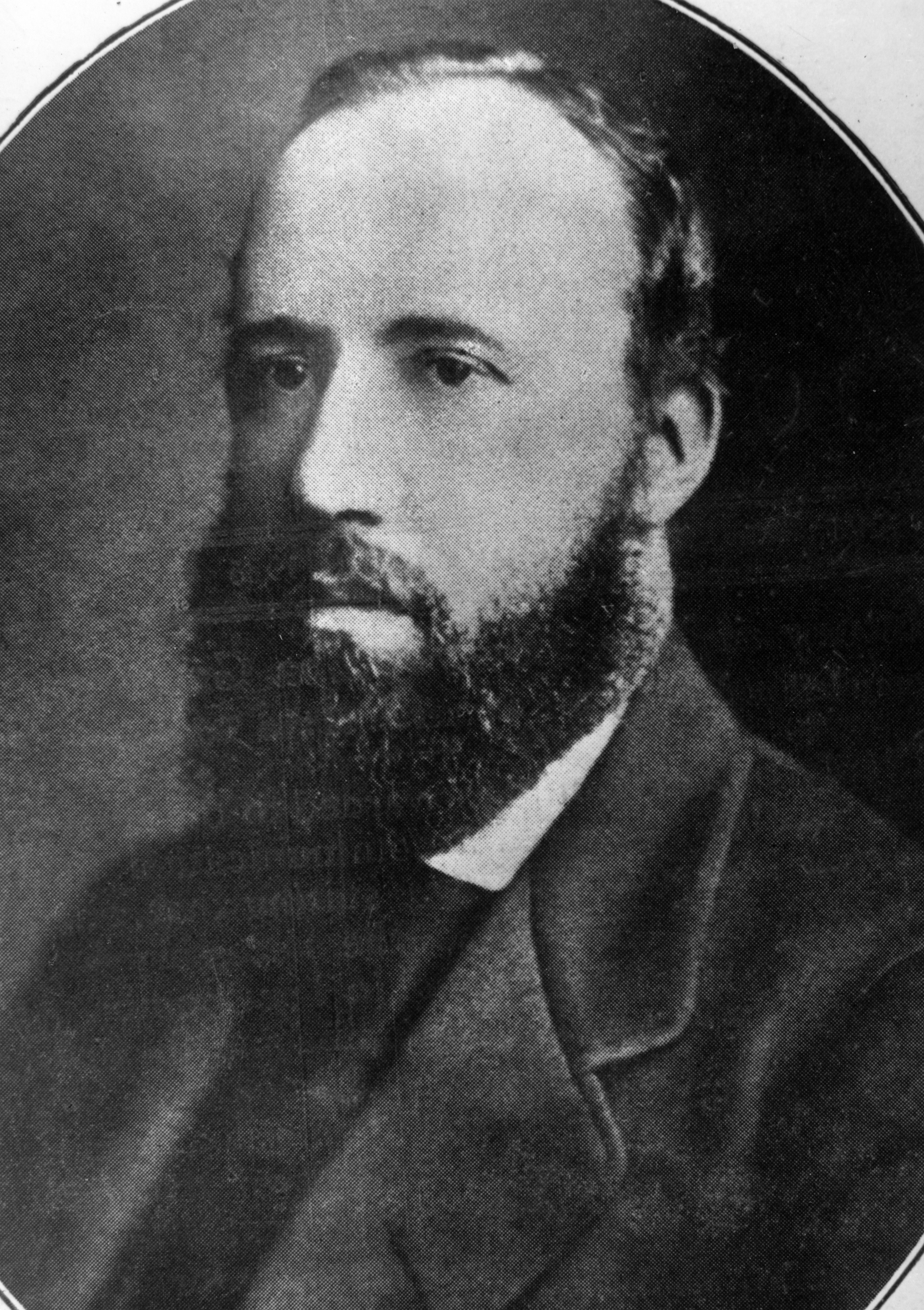
J. Mackintosh, the first headmaster

- 1877–1879 John Mackintosh (died after being thrown from his horse)
- 1879 – F. R. Burkett (appointed but did not take up the position)
- 1879 – Mr Kingsmill (acting)
- 1879–1882 Mr Stephenson (dismissed)
- 1882–1888 Alfred Mortimer Nesbitt
- 1888–1890 Alexander Jenyns Boyd
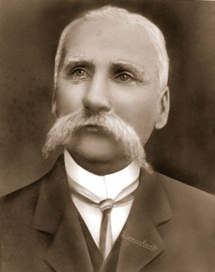
  William Alexander Jenyns Boyd, headmaster 1888-1900
- 1890–1900 Charles Corfe
- 1901–1910 William Alexander Purves
- 1910–1935 George Pitty Barbour
- 1936–1946 Henry Emmanuel Roberts
- 1947–1947 D.C. Griffiths
- 1947–1956 Robert Leslie Mills
- 1956–1961 Leonard Thomas (Len) Heenan
- 1962–1970 Charles Edward (Charlie) Olsen
- 1970–1991 Bill Dent
- 1992–2002 Hugh Rose
- 2003–2020 Peter B. Hauser
- 2021–present Dr John Kinniburgh

== Notable alumni ==
=== Academia ===
- Sidney William Jackson, naturalist and ornithologist
- Eric Partridge, English language lexicographer

=== Culture and the arts ===
- Bill Bolton MBE (1905–1973), philanthropist, Australian heritage collections
- Harold Hopkins, film and TV actor
- Barry Hunter, Anglican Diocese of Riverina
- Alan Jones, radio broadcaster
- Kyle Lindsay, Jazz artist
- J. E. Macdonnell, fiction novelist
- David Rowbotham, poet and journalist
- Geoffrey Saba, classical pianist
- Alfred Stephens (1865–1933), writer and literary critic

=== Military ===
- Sir Harry Chauvel, World War I General
- Cyril Clowes, World War II army Lieutenant General
- Walter Coxen, World War I Major General
- Cecil Foott, World War I army colonel
- Sir Eric Woodward, military officer and Governor of New South Wales
- Frederick Sidney Cotton OBE, served in two World Wars and was the inventor of the Sidcot Flying Suit.

=== Politics and public administration ===
- Edwin Godsall, politician and Toowoomba mayor
- Sir Littleton Groom, politician and former Speaker of the Australian House of Representatives
- Sir Buri Kidu (1945–1994), first indigenous Chief Justice of Papua New Guinea
- George Knowles, public servant and diplomat
- Wellington Lee, Deputy Lord Mayor of Melbourne and pharmacist
- Bruce Lehrmann, Former Liberal Party staffer proved on the balance of probabilities to have raped Brittany Higgins
- Sandy McPhie, politician
- Andrew Metcalfe, former public servant and policymaker
- Clive Palmer, Mining magnate (attended for eight weeks, received a Track and Field Scholarship)
- Sir Reginald Swartz, politician serving several decades

=== Sport ===
- Will Brown, Supercars racing driver
- Isaac Cooper, Australian Gold Medalist Swimmer – Tokyo 2020
- Arthur Corfe, rugby union player for the Queensland Reds and Australian wallabies (1899)
- Jordan Courtney-Perkins, Brisbane Roar defender
- Matthew Denny, Olympic athlete
- Jason Little, Rugby union player, one-time Australian captain
- Martin Love, Australian cricketer
- Benny Pike, Olympic athlete
- Hunter Poon, first Chinese-Australian player of first-class cricket
- Samson Ryan, AFL Footballer
- Hamish Stewart, rugby union player for the Queensland Reds
- Eli Adams, soccer player for the Newcastle Jets

== See also ==
- List of schools in Queensland
- List of boarding schools
