= Results of the 1933 Queensland local elections =

This is a list of local government area results for the 1933 Queensland local elections.

== Dalby ==
1933 Queensland local elections: Dalby
Party	Candidate	Votes	%	±%
Independent	John Joheph Walsh (elected)	1,156		
Independent	William John Vowles (elected)	1,077		
Independent	Daniel Wilke (elected)	978		
Independent	Peter Garrow (elected)	964		
Independent	Henry Edwin Coles (elected)	917		
Independent	Edwin Stuart Cootes (elected)	850		
Independent	Ernest James Starling (elected)	825		
Independent	Edward Henry Geisel (elected)	743		
Independent	James Johnston	710		
Independent	Richard Charles Drew	676		
Independent	Adolphus Allan Baker	605		
Independent	William Evans Ewing	594		

== Glengallan ==
1933 Queensland local elections: Glengallan
Party	Votes	%	Swing	Seats	Change
Independent	6,692	100.0		11	Steady
Formal votes	6,692	100.0			

=== Division 1 ===
1933 Queensland local elections: Division 1
Party	Candidate	Votes	%	±%
Independent	G. T. Lomas (elected)	204		
Independent	Jos. Aspinall (elected)	180		
Independent	P. Fanning	110		

=== Division 2 ===
1933 Queensland local elections: Division 2
Party	Candidate	Votes	%	±%
Independent	H. E. Carey (elected)	679		
Independent	C. Brooker (elected)	545		
Independent	C. J. Neilsen (elected)	514		
Independent	M. J. Hade	514		
Independent	R. J. Aspinall	343		

- C. J. Neilsen defeated M. J. Hade following a recount, after they both received exactly 514 votes

=== Division 3 ===
1933 Queensland local elections: Division 3
Party	Candidate	Votes	%	±%
Independent	W. J. B. Backhouse (elected)	845		
Independent	C. P. Madsen (elected)	650		
Independent	J. H. Hansen (elected)	597		
Independent	A. Bennett	557		
Independent	J. W. Watson	547		
Independent	W. R. Mackenzie	407		

=== Division 4 ===
1933 Queensland local elections: Division 4
Party	Candidate	Votes	%	±%
Independent	J. P. J. Sexton	unopposed		
Independent	T. J. Brosnan	unopposed		
Independent	H. J. Palmer	unopposed		

== Southport ==
1933 Queensland local elections: Southport
Party	Candidate	Votes	%	±%
Independent	J. W. Proud (elected)	716		
Independent	J. R. Brown (elected)	666		
Independent	M. T. Anderson (elected)	568		
Independent	W. Waters (elected)	511		
Independent	A. R. Andrews (elected)	477		
Independent	E. H. Foreman (elected)	476		
Independent	A. A. Ledbury	475		
Independent	J. Shepard	427		
Independent	V. H. Whelan	423		
Independent	A. E. Reid	398		

== Townsville ==
=== Townsville Harbour Board ===
1933 Queensland local elections: Townsville Harbour Board
Party	Candidate	Votes	%	±%
Labor	Thomas Barry (elected)	5,703	25.6	
Progressive	Percy Willmett (elected)	5,416	24.3	
Progressive	John Edward Clegg	4,403	19.7	
Labor	Edward James Copp	3,551	15.9	
Independent	James Andrew Hackett	3,229	14.5	
Total formal votes		22,302		

== Toowoomba ==
1933 Queensland local elections: Toowoomba
Party	Candidate	Votes	%	±%
Independent	John Robinson	6,538		
Independent	Joseph Flatz	6,430		
Independent	Job Eagles Stone	5,748		
Independent	Con. Bowdler	5,371		
Independent	Frank B. Colnmon	5,197		
Independent	Richard C. Cavanough	5,106		
Independent	Atherton A. Griffiths	5,021		
Independent	Henry G. Webb	4,819		
Independent	Charles G. Blair	4,654		
Labor	Reginald Turnbull	4,625		
Independent	August T. Parrot	4,468		
Independent	Edward W. Cleary	4,152		
Independent	Patrick J. Hickey	3,663		
Labor	William James Cronin	3,566		
Labor	James J. Strohfeld	3,280		
Labor	John T. Buchanan	2,809		
Labor	David J. Mohr	2,668		
Labor	Henry J. Goldsworthy	2,554		
Labor	Victor T. Cleary	1,965		
Independent	Joseph Thomson	1,797		
Independent	Albert T. Sussmilch	1,612		
Labor	Jessie Schmidt	1,569		
Communist	William A. Franklin	1,250	1.41	
Total formal votes		88,862	99.09	
Informal votes		820	0.91	
Party total votes
Independent		64,576	72.67	
Labor		23,036	25.92	
Communist		1,250	1.41	

== Warwick ==
1933 Queensland local elections: Warwick
Party	Candidate	Votes	%	±%
	H. H. Dwight (elected)	2,233		
	H. Tucker (elected)	2,207		
	L. E. Evans (elected)	2,054		
	P. D. Kelly (elected)	2,047		
	R. G. Berthelsen (elected)	1,979		
	A. Marshall (elected)	1,971		
	A. G. Winchester (elected)	1,859		
	T. Ingrams (elected)	1,656		
	E. Parker	1,480		
	J. W. Gilham	1,432		
	J. Sanderson	1,386		
	J. R. Hackwood	1,199		
	T. E. Balzer	1,148		
	T. W. Webber	1,111		
	P. Rebelt	984		
	J. K. Murdock	956		

- The Independent Reform Party won a "sweeping majority" over the Citizens' United Party
