= 1933 Queensland mayoral elections =

Australian mayoral election

← 1930	1−29 April 1933	1936 →

The 1933 Queensland mayoral elections were held throughout April 1933 to elect mayors and chairmen to almost all local government areas (LGAs) of Queensland, Australia. These were held as part of the statewide local elections.

== Results ==
=== Cairns ===
1933 Queensland mayoral elections: Cairns
Party	Candidate	Votes	%	±%
Independent	William Aloysius Collins	unopposed		
Independent hold		Swing		

=== Dalby ===
1933 Queensland mayoral elections: Dalby
Party	Candidate	Votes	%	±%
Independent	Thomas Jack	unopposed		
Independent hold		Swing		

=== Southport ===
1933 Queensland mayoral elections: Southport
Party	Candidate	Votes	%	±%
Independent	Henry J. Wilson	931	55.41	
Independent	C. H. Steadman	749	44.59	
Total formal votes		1,680		
Independent gain from Independent		Swing		

=== Townsville ===
1933 Queensland mayoral elections: Townsville
Party	Candidate	Votes	%	±%
Independent	John Stewart Gill		<50.0	
Labor	Anthony Ogden			
Progressive	John Edward Clegg			
Independent hold		Swing		

- Incumbent mayor William John Heatley (Independent) did not recontest

=== Toowoomba ===
1933 Queensland mayoral elections: Toowoomba
Party	Candidate	Votes	%	±%
Independent Country	James Douglas Annand		<50.0	
Independent	Frank Paterson			
Independent	Albert Richard Godsall			
Independent Country gain from Independent		Swing		

=== Warwick ===
1933 Queensland mayoral elections: Warwick
Party	Candidate	Votes	%	±%
Independent Reform	John Allman			
Citizens' United	Daniel Connolly			
Majority		498		
Independent Reform gain from Citizens' United		Swing		
