= Results of the 2024 Queensland local elections in Darling Downs =

2024 Queensland local elections (Darling Downs)
- 16 March 2024

This is a list of results for the 2024 Queensland local elections in the Darling Downs region.

The Darling Downs region encompasses the local government areas (LGAs) of Goondiwindi, Southern Downs, Toowoomba, and Western Downs.

== Goondiwindi ==
2024 Goondiwindi Regional Council election
- 16 March 2024

All 7 seats on Goondiwindi Regional Council 4 seats needed for a majority
- Registered: 7,911
- Mayor
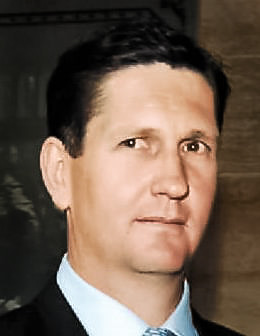
	First party
Candidate	Lawrence Springborg
Party	Ind. LNP
Primary vote	Unopposed
Mayor before election
Lawrence Springborg
Ind. LNP
Elected Mayor
Lawrence Springborg
Ind. LNP
- Councillors
- Turnout: 77.20 (▼3.22)
Party	Leader	Vote %	Seats	+/–
Independents	N/A		4	−1
Ind. LNP	N/A		2	+1
This lists parties that won seats. See the complete results below.

Goondiwindi Regional Council is an undivided council, electing six councillors through plurality block voting.

=== Goondiwindi mayor ===
2024 Queensland mayoral elections: Goondiwindi
Party	Candidate	Votes	%	±%
Independent LNP	Lawrence Springborg	unopposed		
Registered electors		7,911		
Independent LNP hold		Swing	N/A	

=== Goondiwindi results ===
2024 Queensland local elections: Goondiwindi Regional Council
Party	Candidate	Votes	%	±%
Independent	Phil O'Shea (elected)	4,913	13.63	+1.51
Independent LNP	Rob Mackenzie (elected)	4,694	13.02	+2.14
Independent	Jason Watts (elected)	4,579	12.70	+2.78
Independent	Susie Kelly (elected)	4,405	12.22	+3.57
Independent	Julia Spicer (elected)	4,280	11.88	+11.88
Independent LNP	Kym Skinner (elected)	3,743	10.39	+2.43
Independent	David Spooner	3,696	10.25	+1.80
Independent	William Kearney	3,596	9.98	+0.34
Ind. Legalise Cannabis	Anthony Hopkins	2,136	5.93	+5.93
Total formal votes		36,042	100.00	
Total formal ballots		6,007	98.36	+0.23
Informal ballots		100	1.64	−0.23
Turnout		6,107	77.20	−3.22

== Southern Downs ==
2024 Southern Downs Regional Council election
- 16 March 2024

All 9 seats on Southern Downs Regional Council 5 seats needed for a majority
- Registered: 28,325
- Mayor
- Turnout: 86.50% (▲1.64)
	First party	Second party	Third party
	IND	IND	IND
Candidate	Melissa Hamilton	Vic Pennisi	Lindsay Goodwin
Party	Independent	Ind. LNP	Independent
Primary vote	10,995	8,773	3,872
Percentage	46.51%	37.11%	16.38%
Swing	▲46.51	▼7.08	▲16.38
TCP	56.27%	43.73%
TCP swing	▲56.27	▼12.12
Mayor before election
Vic Pennisi
Ind. LNP
Elected Mayor
Melissa Hamilton
Independent
- Councillors
- Turnout: 85.86 (▲3.79)
Party	Leader	Vote %	Seats	+/–
Independents	N/A	75.91	7	+3
Ind. Labor	N/A	6.31	1	+1
This lists parties that won seats. See the complete results below.

Southern Downs Regional Council is an undivided council, electing eight councillors through plurality block voting.

Incumbent mayor Vic Pennisi was defeated by Melissa Hamilton.

=== Southern Downs mayor ===
2024 Queensland mayoral elections: Southern Downs
Party	Candidate	Votes	%	±%
Independent	Melissa Hamilton	10,995	46.51	+46.51
Independent LNP	Vic Pennisi	8,773	37.11	−7.08
Independent	Lindsay Goodwin	3,872	16.38	+16.38
Total formal votes		23,640	96.49	−1.14
Informal votes		861	3.51	+1.14
Turnout		24,501	86.50	+1.64
Two-candidate-preferred result
Independent	Melissa Hamilton	11,779	56.27	+56.27
Independent LNP	Vic Pennisi	9,154	43.73	−12.12
Independent gain from Independent LNP				

=== Southern Downs results ===
2024 Queensland local elections: Southern Downs Regional Council
Party	Candidate	Votes	%	±%
Independent	Sheryl Windle (elected)	14,498	8.25	+3.29
Independent	Carla Maree Pidgeon (elected)	12,739	7.25	+7.25
Independent	Cynthia McDonald (elected)	12,657	7.21	+2.52
Independent	Sarah Deane (elected)	12,112	6.89	+6.89
Independent	Russell Wantling (elected)	11,831	6.74	+2.32
Independent	Ross Bartley (elected)	11,311	6.44	+0.55
Independent Labor	Joel Richters (elected)	11,082	6.31	+6.31
Independent	Morwenna Bernadette Harslett (elected)	10,940	6.23	+6.23
Independent	Ian David Thompson	10,863	6.18	+6.18
Independent	Marika McNichol	10,432	5.94	+2.32
Independent LNP	Andrew Gale	10,428	5.94	+0.94
Independent	Nick Suduk	10,403	5.92	+5.92
Independent LNP	Cameron Gow	10,101	5.75	+0.56
Independent	Stephen Tancred	8,538	4.86	+0.29
Independent	Kelvin Johnston	7,044	4.01	+4.01
Independent Federation	Brett Tunbridge	6,302	3.59	+3.59
Independent Federation	Noel Darrel Grosskopf	4,383	2.50	+2.50
Total formal votes		175,664	100.00	
Total formal ballots		21,958	89.71	−3.13
Informal ballots		2,519	10.29	+3.13
Turnout		24,477	86.41	+2.02

== Toowoomba ==
2024 Toowoomba Regional Council election
- 16 March 2024

All 11 seats on Toowoomba Regional Council 6 seats needed for a majority
- Registered: 126,513
- Mayor
- Turnout: 85.97% (▲3.92)
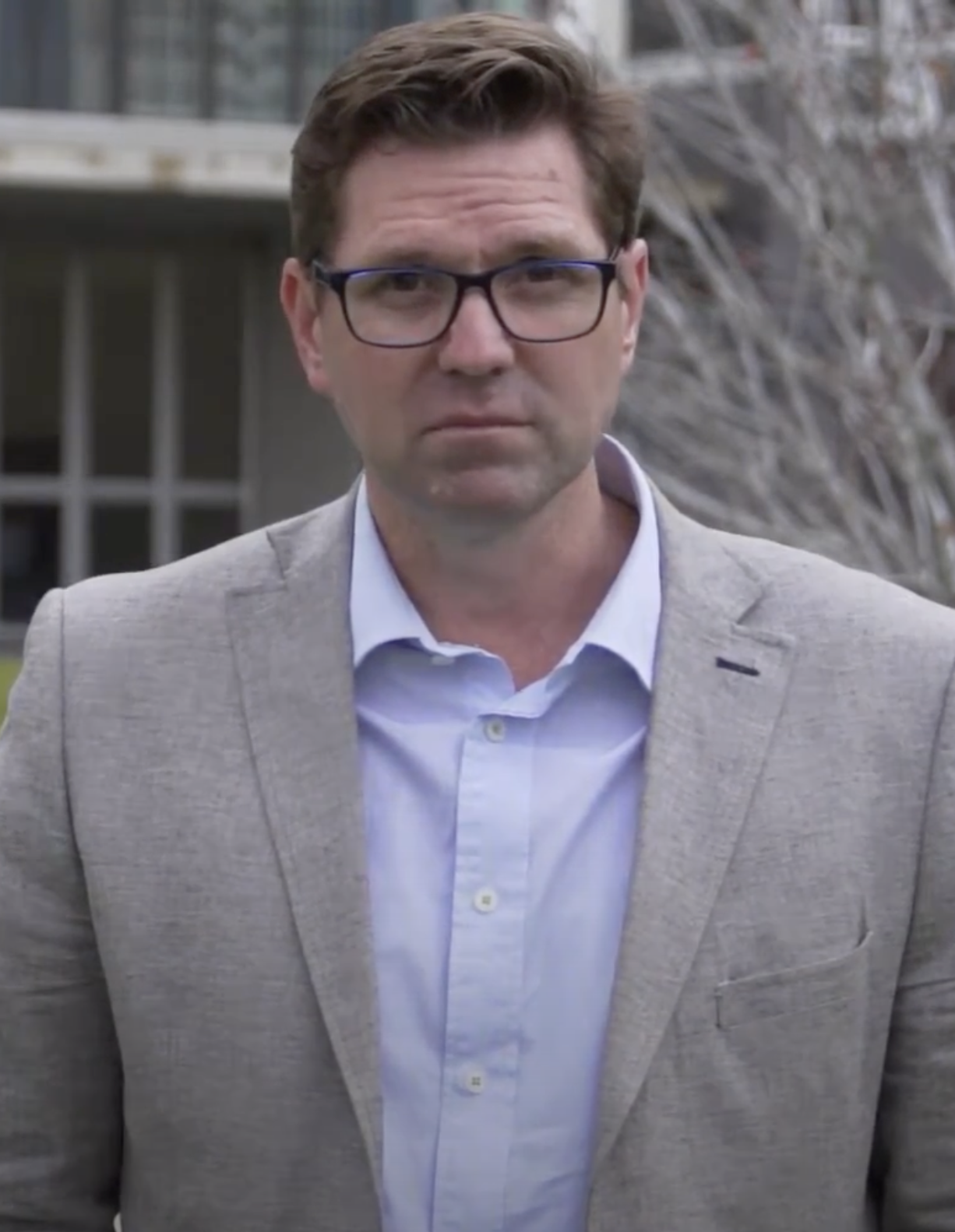
	First party	Second party
		IND
Candidate	Geoff McDonald	Douglas Doelle
Party	Independent	Independent
Primary vote	85,176	18,056
Percentage	82.51%	17.49%
Swing	▲82.51	▲9.41
Mayor before election
Geoff McDonald
Independent
Elected Mayor
Geoff McDonald
Independent
- Councillors
- Turnout: 85.86 (▲3.79)
Party	Leader	Vote %	Seats	+/–
Independent	N/A		6	+1
Ind. LNP	N/A		2	−1
Ind. Labor	N/A		2	0
This lists parties that won seats. See the complete results below.

Toowoomba Regional Council is an undivided council, electing ten councillors through plurality block voting.

=== Toowoomba mayor ===
2024 Queensland mayoral elections: Toowoomba
Party	Candidate	Votes	%	±%
Independent	Geoff McDonald	85,176	82.51	+82.51
Independent	Douglas Doelle	18,056	17.49	+9.41
Total formal votes		103,232	94.91	−1.18
Informal votes		5,535	5.09	+1.18
Turnout		108,767	85.97	+3.92
Geoff McDonald hold				

=== Toowoomba results ===
2024 Queensland local elections: Toowoomba Regional Council
Party	Candidate	Votes	%	±%
Independent LNP	Rebecca Vonhoff (elected)	77,397	7.96	+1.87
Independent	James O'Shea (elected)	60,790	6.25	+0.86
Independent	Melissa Taylor (elected)	60,401	6.21	+1.56
Independent Labor	Kerry Shine (elected)	58,902	6.06	+0.78
Independent	Gary Gardner (elected)	57,155	5.88	+5.88
Independent LNP	Tim McMahon (elected)	56,265	5.79	+2.02
Independent	Carol Taylor (elected)	52,561	5.40	−0.14
Independent	Bill Cahill (elected)	50,050	5.15	−0.17
Independent	Edwina Farquhar (elected)	48,765	5.01	+5.01
Independent Labor	Trevor Manteufel (elected)	39,979	4.11	+4.11
Independent	Andrew Reeson	31,890	3.28	+3.28
Independent	Mark Orford	31,492	3.24	+3.24
Independent	Paul Wilson	30,086	3.09	+3.09
Independent	Scot McPhie	29,207	3.00	+3.00
Greens	Ellisa Parker	28,645	2.95	+2.95
Independent	Eakraj Adhikari	28,163	2.90	+1.62
Say NO to WOKE	Nathan Essex	27,976	2.88	+2.88
Independent	Chris Brameld	27,121	2.79	+2.79
Independent	Michelle McIntyre	24,626	2.53	+2.53
Independent	Robert Relvas	23,951	2.46	+1.34
Independent	David King	23,138	2.38	+0.96
Say NO to WOKE	Adam Carney	22,442	2.31	+2.31
Independent	Gavin Mingay	18,992	1.95	+1.95
Independent Federation	Martin Hartwig	18,801	1.93	+1.93
Westgarths	Leeanne Westgarth	18,438	1.90	+1.90
Westgarths	George Westgarth	13,912	1.43	+1.43
Westgarths	Angus Westgarth	11,315	1.16	+1.16
Total formal votes		972,460	100.00	
Total formal ballots		97,246	89.52	+0.47
Informal ballots		11,384	10.48	−0.47
Turnout		108,630	85.86	+3.79

== Western Downs ==
2024 Western Downs Regional Council election
- 16 March 2024

All 9 seats on Western Downs Regional Council 5 seats needed for a majority
- Registered: 24,415
- Mayor
- Turnout: 75.10% (▼0.81)
	First party	Second party
	IND	IND
Candidate	Andrew Smith	Glenn Strandquist
Party	Independent	Independent
Primary vote	13,687	4,306
Percentage	76.07%	23.93%
Swing	▲76.07	▼2.61
Mayor before election
Paul McVeigh
Independent
Elected Mayor
Andrew Smith
Independent
- Councillors
- Turnout: 77.20 (▼3.22)
Party	Leader	Vote %	Seats	+/–
Independents	N/A	80.20	6	−2
Ind. LNP	N/A	19.80	2	+2
This lists parties that won seats. See the complete results below.

Western Downs Regional Council is an undivided council, electing eight councillors through plurality block voting.

=== Western Downs mayor ===
2024 Queensland mayoral elections: Western Downs
Party	Candidate	Votes	%	±%
Independent	Andrew Smith	13,687	76.07	+76.07
Independent	Glenn Strandquist	4,306	23.93	−2.61
Total formal votes		17,993	98.13	−0.39
Informal votes		342	1.87	+0.39
Turnout		18,335	75.10	−0.81
Independent gain from Independent				

=== Western Downs results ===
2024 Queensland local elections: Western Downs Regional Council
Party	Candidate	Votes	%	±%
Independent	Megan James (elected)	14,818	10.67	+3.48
Independent	Kylie Bourne (elected)	14,625	10.53	+2.72
Independent LNP	Kaye Maguire (elected)	13,848	9.97	+3.05
Independent	Peter Saxelby (elected)	13,821	9.95	+1.94
Independent LNP	Sophie Bougoure (elected)	13,657	9.83	+9.83
Independent	George Moore (elected)	13,366	9.62	+3.08
Independent	Greg Olm (elected)	13,067	9.41	+3.43
Independent	Sam Condon (elected)	12,688	9.14	+4.07
Independent	Kathryn Prenzler	10,660	7.68	+7.68
Independent	Robert Ries	9,453	6.81	+6.81
Independent	David Carvosso	8,877	6.39	+6.39
Total formal votes		138,880	100.00	
Total formal ballots		17,360	96.62	+0.93
Informal ballots		607	3.38	−0.93
Turnout		17,967	73.59	+5.21
