= Toowoomba City Hall =

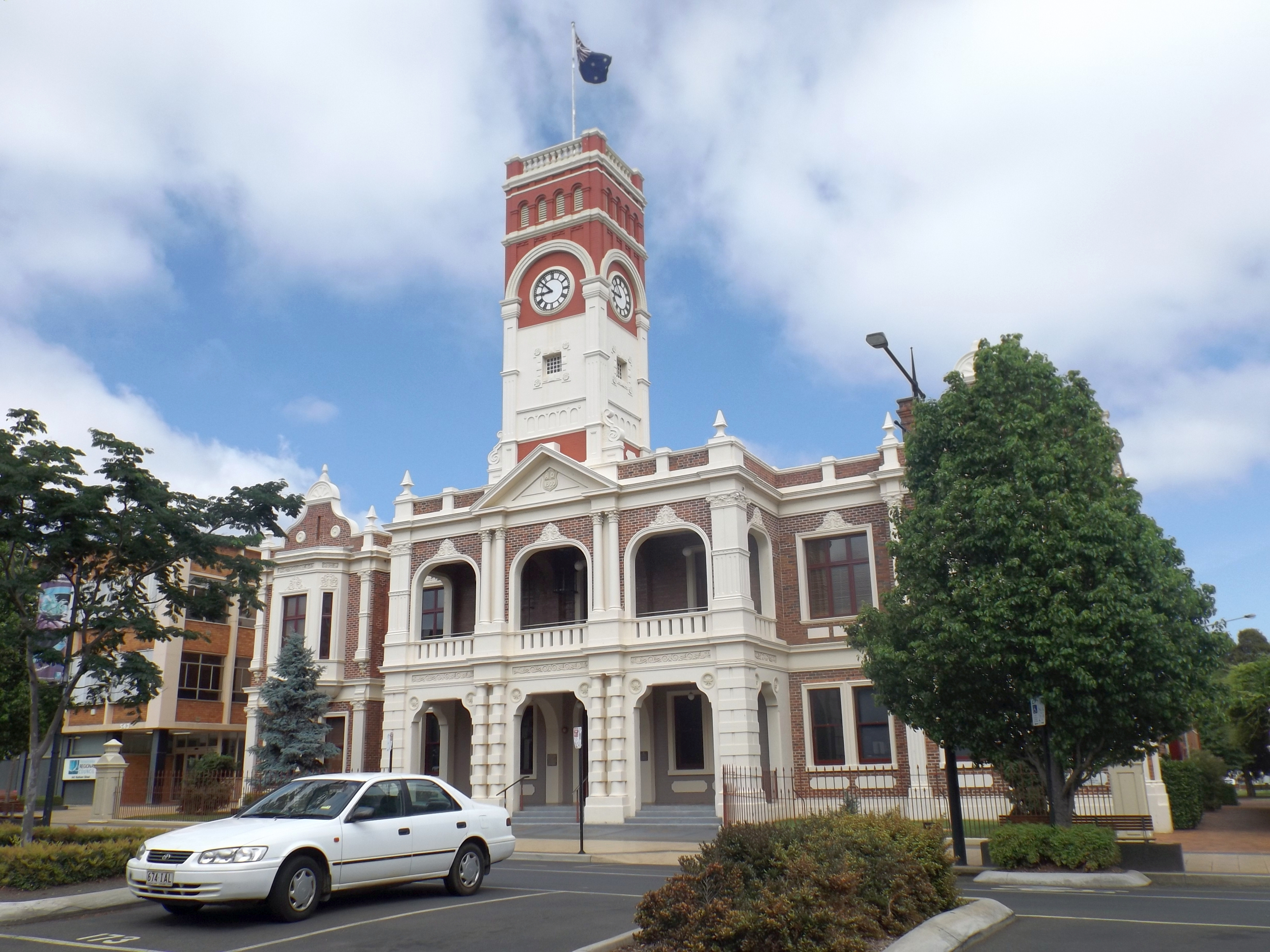
- Toowoomba City Hall, 2014

- Location within Queensland
- 27.5641°S 151.9524°E
- Location: 541 Ruthven Street, Toowoomba, Toowoomba Region, Queensland, Australia

History
- Design period: 1900–1914 (early 20th century)
- Built: 1900–1937

Site notes
- Architect: Willoughby Powell

Queensland Heritage Register
- Official name: Toowoomba City Hall, Toowoomba Town Hall
- Type: state heritage (built)
- Designated: 21 October 1992
- Reference no.: 600865
- Significant period: 1900s, 1937 (fabric); 1900–ongoing (historical, social)
- Significant components: auditorium, council chamber/meeting room, strong room, office/s, clock, fence/wall – perimeter, tower – clock
- Builders: Alexander Mayne

Toowoomba City Hall is a heritage-listed town hall at 541 Ruthven Street, Toowoomba, Toowoomba Region, Queensland, Australia. It was designed by Willoughby Powell and built in 1900 by Alexander Mayne. It is also known as Toowoomba Town Hall. It was added to the Queensland Heritage Register on 21 October 1992.

It is the third town hall in Toowoomba and the building was the location for the proclamation that Toowoomba was a city and was the first purpose built city hall ever constructed in Queensland.

== History ==
Toowoomba City Hall, the city's third town hall, was built in 1900 to a design by Willoughby Powell on the site of the School of Arts. When first constructed, City Hall incorporated municipal offices and council chambers, rooms for a school of arts, a technical college and public hall.

The first settlement in the Toowoomba area was established on the present site of Drayton in 1842, and a mail service commenced in December 1845. A survey of Drayton in 1850, the third to be carried out, followed a severe drought at the end of the 1840s which taxed Drayton's water supply. This shortage prompted many residents to consider moving to the Drayton Swamp Agricultural Area (The Swamp), where water was plentiful.

In 1853 a survey of the swamp area was carried out and land sales took place in November in the same year. The Swamp was subsequently named Toowoomba in 1858. On 30 June 1860, a petition by Toowoomba residents seeking incorporation as a municipality was successful and proclamation of the Borough of Toowoomba occurred on 24 November 1860. Local government was established in November 1860, and elections were held in January 1861. One of the first projects undertaken was the construction of a town hall in James Street. Tenders were called in 1861 and a simple timber structure was built by Frederick Stein and completed in January 1862.

In July 1865 the first section on railway line in Queensland was opened to Ipswich and by April 1867 the line reached Toowoomba, securing the town's future development. The 1860s saw the rapid expansion of Toowoomba with the founding of the Toowoomba Chronicle; the establishment of the first banking business, the construction of a gaol, the opening of the School of Arts and a Court House. The 1870s witnessed the opening of the Toowoomba Grammar School, the commencement of the Toowoomba Foundry, the draining of the swamps and the commencement of waterworks. In 1887 Toowoomba was proclaimed a town.

The first town hall was a timber building, which was demolished and replaced in 1881 by a brick building.

As Toowoomba developed as the leading centre of the Darling Downs and surrounding areas, the prosperity was translated into impressive commercial and residential structures. The Council decided a new town hall was necessary and the first town hall was demolished and the new brick building, designed by Sydney architect Albert Myers, opened in 1880. The land on which the second town hall was built was later sold to the State Government who built the South Toowoomba Boys' School on the site in 1906.

When the second town hall was constructed, the form of Toowoomba as a town had not been firmly established, in particular the town centre was not well defined. Commercial activities tended to focus on the lower end of Russell Street, near the Toowoomba railway station, while government activities centred on the courthouse in Margaret Street, north-east of the town hall. By the 1890s it was evident that neither government or commercial activities were interested in moving. As a result of the increasing isolation of the town hall from the commercial centre, the Council began examining the feasibility of building another town hall in a more central location. A major problem was the acquisition of a suitable block of land, which, by this stage, would have meant considerable expense for the Council. A proposal that a new hall be built on the site of the School of Arts in Ruthven Street, a site acquired by the Toowoomba Council in 1887, was rejected on the basis that such an action would involve building a new School of Arts. Later, however, when the School of Arts building was badly damaged by a fire on 21 June 1898, the proposal to build a new town hall on the site was again raised in a Council meeting and the motion was approved.

Prior to acquiring the site in Ruthven Street, the Council proceeded with a competition, with a prize of 30 guineas, for the design of a new town hall. Following approval to build a hall, a sub-committee examined the entries and recommended that William Hodgen be awarded first prize. However, Toowoomba Municipal Council Minutes from 3 October 1898 report that the recommendation was rejected. A new competition, with a prize of 25 guineas, was announced. Five entries were received and first prize was awarded to Willoughby Powell for his design entitled "Sincerity".

Willoughby Powell was born c. 1848 in Cheltenham, Gloucestershire, England and died in Queensland in 1920. Powell emigrated to Australia in 1872 and worked for Brisbane architect Richard Gailey before joining the Queensland Public Works Department as a draftsman in 1874. From 1875 to 1877 he maintained a busy practice in Toowoomba, later claiming to have erected "the majority of the principal buildings" there and in the surrounding district. Powell was eventually appointed to the permanent staff of the Works Department in 1899. Powell had to give up supervision of the construction of the Toowoomba Town Hall to Toowoomba architects, James Marks and Son, to receive his permanent appointment. Some of Powell's designs in the Toowoomba area include Toowoomba Grammar School buildings and master's residence in 1875; Jewish Synagogue, corner Herries and Neil Streets (1875–1876); Gabbinbar for Rev. William Lambie Nelson (1876) and additions to Clifford House for the Hon. James Taylor in c. 1877 and the Warwick Town Hall. In its exterior form, Toowoomba Town Hall is similar to the smaller and less elaborately decorated Warwick Town Hall, built of sandstone in the late 1880s.

Alexander Mayne's tender of £6440 was accepted on 22 November 1899, and on 20 February 1900, the foundation stone was laid by His Excellency Lieutenant-Governor of Queensland, Sir Samuel Griffith. Officially opened by the Mayor of Toowoomba, Alderman Matthew Keefe, on 12 December 1900, Toowoomba Town Hall was originally divided into three parts.

The School of Arts and Technical College on the first floor included class rooms and a committee room at the southern end, a large reading room opening out to the first floor balcony and a ladies' reading room and another class room at the northern end. A corridor led to another classroom and the library located towards the western side on the first floor. The public hall or theatre was at the western end of the building. There were a number of entrances to the gallery including a ground floor lobby and staircase on the northern wall of the building.

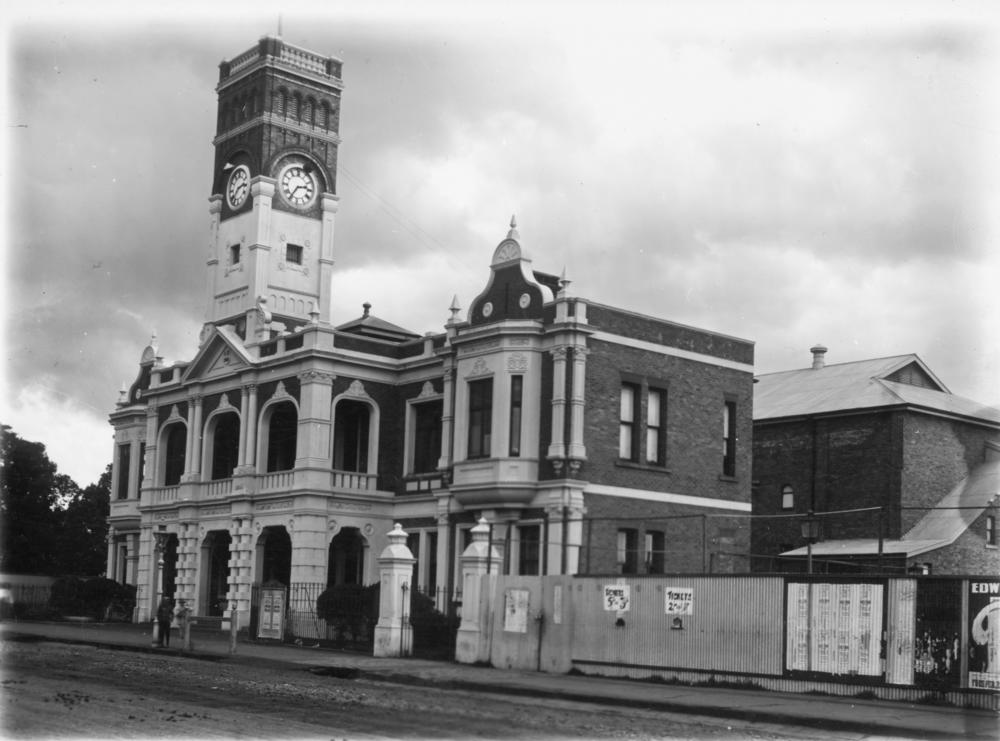
Town hall in 1915

Contemporary publications describe the Hall as:

"a spacious hall ten feet in width, and running right through to the theatre...on the ground floor are the municipal offices, those on the right being occupied by the Town Clerk and the Mayor. On the left hand side...comes the Rate Collector's Office and another for the Town Engineer....the Municipal Chamber...in finish and appointments...is very fine...The ceiling is particularly artistic, being stamped metal and picked out in soft and suitable colours".

"Ascending the grand staircase...here [upper storey] are located the suite of rooms for the School of Arts and Technical College...Four rooms are provided for Technical College purposes, one being a particularly large classroom...the theatre [at the western end of the building]...carries 231 reserved stall seats, 108 second stall seats and 450 seats in the pit...The auditorium is a very handsome piece of work, being of stamped metal...underneath the stage are the dressing rooms."

There are a number of fireplaces located on the ground floor in the Council Chambers and in other offices, and on the upper level in the reading rooms and the committee room.

The original plans for the building did not provide for a public clock and the tower was planned as a much lower structure with a spire. During construction of the building, the matter of installing a clock was raised, and at the council meeting of 4 June 1900 it was decided that a clock should be imported from England. The turret clock was installed in the early 1900s at a cost of about £400. It was made by Gillett and Johnston, still one of Britain's great turret clock manufacturers. Its installation remains a monument to Toowoomba watchmaker Mr H. Walker, who for many years conducted business as Henry Walker and Son Ltd in Ruthven Street almost opposite Bell Street. S.S. Devonshire is believed to be the ship which brought the clock and bells to Australia. On one of the two bells that chime the quarter hour, the words S.S. Devonshire can still be seen.

After its construction in 1900, City Hall was the venue for many uses. For more than sixty years the main administrative functions of the Toowoomba City Council were located in the hall. It has been an important venue for educational activities and housed for over 50 years, Toowoomba's main lending library. Situated on the first floor, the library began as the School of Arts Library.

A School of Arts committee was established in Toowoomba in the late 1850s, and the first School of Arts was erected in 1861 on land donated by Arthur Hodgson. This was the same site on which City Hall was erected in 1900. According to Toowoomba City Council records, a second and more substantial building was erected in 1877. This was the building that was demolished following a fire in 1898, to make way for the new town hall. For over 20 years, the library was well patronised, however, by the 1930s, the School of Arts committee began to have difficulties maintaining the collection. Lack of government funding, the growth of local circulation libraries and a diminishing number of subscribers added to the problems. Eventually, the library was taken over by the city council and remained in the hall until 1951. The School of Arts also conducted classes in technical and general education, one of the few avenues available to those wishing to pursue higher education. The hall was the venue for technical education for more than a decade. As the number of students increased, accommodation became a serious concern. In 1911, a purpose-built technical college (the Toowoomba Technical College) was erected in Margaret Street and the Queensland Government assumed responsibility for technical education from the School of Arts committee.

Added to City Hall's municipal and educational events, were the cultural and social events, which have been one of the building's most enduring functions. Such activities included public meetings, concerts and other musical events, drama and even sporting events, such as boxing and wrestling. Over time different requirements and standards have resulted in various alterations and additions to the building. The theatre has undergone more changes than any other part of the building. Prior to renovations in the 1940s, the raked floor and fixed seating of the auditorium limited its use. Whenever there was an audience facing the stage, the gentle fall was not a problem; however, it could not be used for dances or balls.

By the mid-1930s the need to improve the facilities became urgent. In early 1935 the Toowoomba Art Society was formed and one of their first activities was to lobby the Council "to make provision in their plans for a room suitable for the display of works of art." Space had become available in the City Hall following the relocation of the Technical College to its own building at the corner of Hume and Margaret Streets in 1911. After Council decided to renovate the theatre and provide space for an art gallery and additional offices, work was undertaken in two stages. The first stage involved extending the building to provide a room on the first floor for an art gallery and office space on the ground floor for council staff. This extension was completed in 1937 at a cost of £2400 and was designed by the local firm of Hodgen and Hodgen. It was an unobtrusive addition and involved the enclosing of the open space between the front section of the building and the theatre on the northern side. Skylights were installed to provide lighting to the art gallery and also to the main stairwell.

The second stage, in the 1940s, involved major alterations to the theatre, at a cost of £5200. The existing gallery was demolished and replaced with a smaller gallery. In the main auditorium the seats were rearranged to provide easier access and better sightlines to the stage, but reducing seating capacity. Other work involved remodelling the interior decoration, the installation of a new proscenium, improvements to the ventilation, raising of the roof above the stage and gallery and the fitting of new seats.

Of the original four ornamental pillars used in the external landscape works to City Hall, two were removed and installed at the old Toowoomba Showgrounds in Campbell Street as gates posts in the 1940s.

In 1972–1973, further major alterations were undertaken to City Hall principally involving the theatre. Carried out under the direction of local architects Durack and Brammer for a cost of more than $300 000, the work included the removal of the main floor and balcony and the construction of a new floor to improve sight lines, new seating which again reduced capacity, refurbished foyer, refreshment facilities, new dressing rooms, and wider stage and improved backstage facilities. The theatre was re-opened in July 1973 by the Mayor, Alderman Nell Robinson.

When opened, the council chambers and offices were situated on the ground floor, however, as staff numbers increased, so did the demand for extra space. When the technical college moved out in 1911, council staff took over their rooms. More space was available for council staff when the former School of Arts library vacated the building in 1951. By the early 1950s, both the ground and first floors of the front section of the building, with the exception of a room on the first floor for the art gallery, were devoted to council offices. Eventually it was necessary to construct a new office complex, and in 1963 a three storeyed building, the Council Administration Building, was constructed in nearby Herries Street. In late 1963, when the Board of Education moved in, City Hall was again the venue for educational activities. The Board have subsequently relocated.

On the closure of the showgrounds in 1985, when the Royal Agricultural Society moved to its current premises at Glenvale, the two pillars from the Town Hall being used as gateposts were dismantled and re-erected outside City Hall.

The Toowoomba Art Gallery moved out of City Hall in March 1994 into their own premises nearby in the former SWQEB building. Commencing in 1995, City Hall has undergone major refurbishment by Allom Lovell Marquis Kyle Architects with the exterior of the building being restored to its original state in 1997. Provisions were made to enable councillors, staff and others to move from City Hall into council offices located in the adjoining Commonwealth Building. By doing so, this allowed the symbolic seat of local government to return to its original place of residence as the councillors once again meet in City Hall.

== Description ==
Toowoomba City Hall, a two-storeyed masonry building with a central square tower and corrugated iron gabled roof to the rear, is located in the centre of Toowoomba fronting Ruthven Street to the east. The Hall has tuck-pointed masonry with rendered classical detailing. The roof of the front facade is concealed behind a facebrick parapet with decorative rendered accents to the skyline.

The form of the 1900 hall is still reasonably intact with meeting rooms situated at the front of the building and the auditorium at the rear. Renovations and alterations, predominantly to the theatre, were undertaken in 1937, part of the northern elevation was also infilled at this time. In 1972–1973, further refurbishment to the theatre was completed. In 1995, a link between the hall and the adjoining Commonwealth Offices was constructed.

The Ruthven Street section has a symmetrical ornately decorated facade with classical detailing to the street, consisting of a wide projecting central bay with narrower bays to either side. The building is framed by curvilinear gables at the northern and southern ends of the parapet.

The ground floor has three arches to the central section, with rendered rusticated columns and squared Corinthian pilaster decoration. The central arches open to an entrance portico accessed via wide steps.

The first floor is composed similarly, with three central arches with decorative motif to the centre of the arch and a crowning triangular pediment. The central arch is flanked by paired circular Corinthian pilasters with square Corinthian pilasters at the corner of the projecting bay.

The clock tower, with extant clock faces, is square in plan, with square Doric pilasters at each corner. The tower has arched mouldings surrounding each clock face. The top portion of the clock tower is painted brown and the bottom portion is cream. Square ventilation openings are situated on each side at the bottom of the tower, and grouped arched ventilation openings are situated at the top. The tower is topped by a balustraded parapet.

Bays on the ground level on either side of the central entrance have sash windows surrounded by rendered architraves. Ramp access is situated at the southern end of the front facade. The bays to either side of the first floor balcony have oriel windows with decorative mouldings. The oriel windows are framed by rendered squared Corinthian pilasters. Windows flanking the central arches are surrounded by rendered architraves with a centred decorative moulded motif.

Tuck-pointed brickwork continues along the eastern end of the northern elevation. Both the ground and first floors have two double hung sash windows and a single narrower window along the eastern end of the facade. The infill undertaken during the 1930s refurbishment is evident along the facade. The staircase at the western end of the facade, originally external, has been infilled and roofed in corrugated iron. As part of the 1970s refurbishment, arches along the western end of the elevation were infilled and replaced with windows and doors.

The rear of the hall, the western elevation, has a corrugated iron gabled roof with ridge ventilators. A steel fire stair has been added to the northern end of the facade. Door and window openings which have been infilled are evident along the entire facade. Access to the rear of the building is via three doors associated with the fire exit and via a doorway in a square, brick extension, built during the refurbishments in the 1970s, at the southern end of the building. The face brickwork facade is divided by piers at regular intervals.

The front entrance, paired, panelled timber doors in a moulded arched entrance, with fanlight assembly, opens to a central lobby. The paired, glass doors in the foyer have timber panels at their base and open to a foyer with an arched hall. The turning timber staircase, in its original position and adapted with stainless steel handrails to conform to regulation heights, leads to the first level. The square- based turned newels are topped by a moulded capital. The shafts have decorative circular moulded motifs at the top, the remainder is chamfered with recessed moulded detail.

Internally on the first floor, offices flank the central foyer opening off corridors running north and south. From the foyer, the offices are accessed via paired timber doors in arched entrances. The reception area, to the north of the foyer, (which is also accessed via a door in the lobby), includes a strong room which formed part of the original design of the building. The rooms are simple in design and decoration and are connected via two separate, panelled, timber doors with architraves. One doorway is topped by a single-pane fanlight. The rooms have a plastered cornices and a back-to-back fireplace with timber surrounds and mantle.

To the south of the foyer, the rooms are similar to those situated to the north, comprising simplicity in design and detail. The one exception is the largest meeting room on the ground floor, which is the original council chambers. The ornate plastered ceiling is decorated with moulded panels and a ceiling rose. The timber fireplace, with timber panels in the lintel, has a tiled register grate and decorative timber consoles.

Internally, the second floor has a reception area created by the addition of free standing walls. Large paired panelled timber doors with fanlights, open, on the eastern side to the a large function room, and, on the western side, into the bar area. The rooms on the eastern side of the floor open off a corridor.

The large function room, which can be closed off via a timber partition, has a fireplace located at southern end of the room and three french doors opening onto the first floor balcony. The room has a skylight with clerestory windows. The skylight is lined with timber panels and has a circular ventilated opening, with decorative fretwork. The ornate plaster ceiling is decorated with panels and a ceiling rose. Other meeting rooms on the first floor are similar to those on the ground floor with plaster cornice detail and timber architraves. The Mayor's office is located at the southern end of the floor. A bay window faces the east and a timber fireplace is located along the southern end of the wall. The plaster ceiling has moulded designs around the light fittings. The adjoining office has a timber ceiling with a plaster ceiling rose, surrounded by a ventilation grate.

The auditorium is lined with non-original timber panelling. The seats are tiered and are covered in non-original black upholstery. Fire exits are located along the western wall. Other doorways are located in the northern wall and the eastern wall. The door in the eastern wall leads to a staircase to the ground floor lobby area.

Internally, in the area that was infilled in the 1930s, toilets are located along the northern end of the ground floor. A small corridor leads to the pre-function room which joins the auditorium foyer via a folding partition. On the first floor, on the western side of the building, also part of the 1930s infill, is a large meeting room. The room has three regularly spaced ceiling panels comprising glass sections with fluorescent lighting behind the panels. A similar ceiling panel is situated in reception area on the first floor.

Internally, to the rear of the ground floor, a second turning timber staircase, part of the 1970s refurbishment, leads to the auditorium. A set of swing doors, also part of the 1970s renovations, lead to the auditorium foyer. Openings to the southern side of the section lead to a lift lobby and out to the covered courtyard.

On the first floor, located on the western side of the floor is the function area including a bar and kitchenette. Amenities blocks are located along the western side of the link. A lift is also located along the western side of the wall. This section of the floor leads through to the glazed, steel-framed link to the Commonwealth Offices on the adjoining block. The link is constructed over a courtyard.

The hall has a fence at the front of the building with non-original cast iron railings and original moulded concrete pillars. The rear of the site has a bitumen surfaced carpark.

== Heritage listing ==
Toowoomba City Hall was listed on the Queensland Heritage Register on 21 October 1992 having satisfied the following criteria.

The place is important in demonstrating the evolution or pattern of Queensland's history.

Toowoomba City Hall is significant as the focus for local government in Toowoomba for more than ninety years. Its generous size and grand character provide evidence of the prosperity and importance of Toowoomba as a major regional centre at the turn of the century.

The place is important in demonstrating the principal characteristics of a particular class of cultural places.

Toowoomba City Hall is significant as a intact example of an early twentieth century civic building in Queensland, incorporating eclectic stylistic elements in its design.

The place is important because of its aesthetic significance.

With its east elevation facing Ruthven Street, Toowoomba City Hall makes an important contribution to the streetscape and provides a focal point for that part of the street with its landmark tower.

The place has a strong or special association with a particular community or cultural group for social, cultural or spiritual reasons.

As the site of the first School of Arts, prior to the construction of the hall, and with the hall housing a School of Arts and Technical College during its early years, the place demonstrates the continued public use of the property for over 100 years. The building continues a long association with the people of Toowoomba and surrounding areas as a focal point for social, and community functions.

The place has a special association with the life or work of a particular person, group or organisation of importance in Queensland's history.

Toowoomba City Hall is associated with the work of architect Willoughby Powell, as one of a number of substantial public buildings in Queensland designed by Powell during the late nineteenth and early twentieth centuries. The building is also associated with prominent Toowoomba architect William Hodgen, who designed the 1937 alterations.

== See also ==
- List of city and town halls
