= McWaters =

McWaters is a surname. Notable people with the surname include:

- Alfred McWaters, Australian mayor
- Jeff McWaters (born 1956), American politician
- William McWaters (c. 1844–1875), American outlaw
