= Frank Patterson (disambiguation) =

Frank Patterson (1938–2000) was an Irish tenor.

Frank Patterson may also refer to:

- Frank Patterson (American football) (1873–1939), American football coach
- Frank Patterson (illustrator) (1871–1952), English illustrator of cycling
- Frank Harris Patterson (1891–1976), judge and historian in Nova Scotia Canada
- Frank Jefferson Patterson, co-founder of National Cash Register, brother of John H. Patterson
- Frank N. Patterson Jr. (1917–1971), politician in North Carolina
- Frank Porter Patterson (died 1938), physician and politician in British Columbia, Canada
- Frank Stuart Patterson (1897–1918), Army Air Corp test pilot, son of Frank Jefferson Patterson

== See also ==
- Frank Paterson (fl. 1930s), surveyor and mayor in Australia
- Francis Patterson (disambiguation)
