= Toowoomba Grammar School buildings =

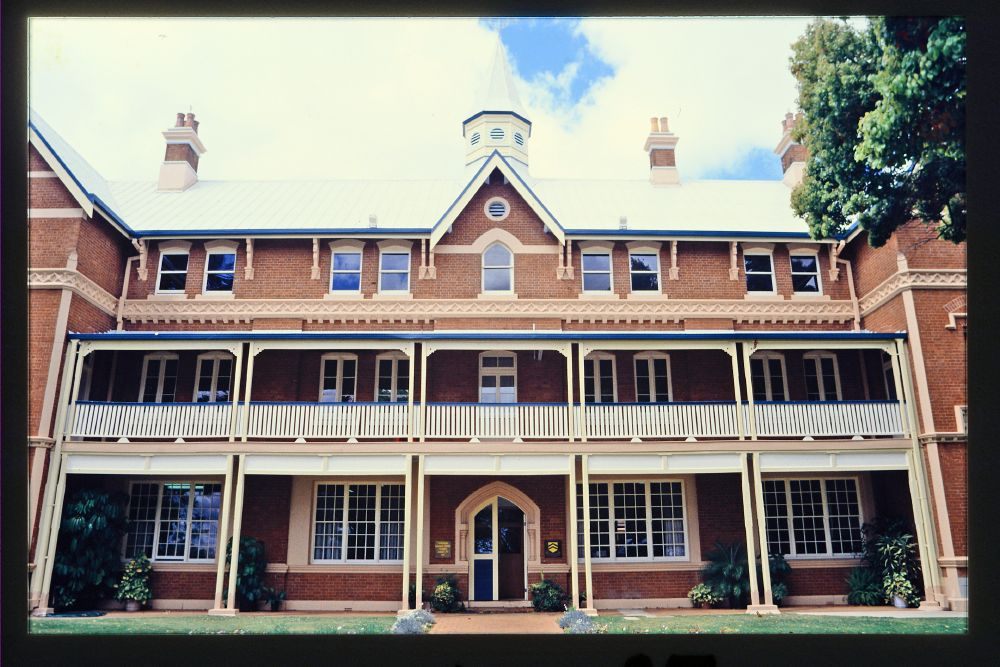
- School House, 1994

- Location within Queensland
- 27.5646°S 151.9676°E
- Location: 24-60 Margaret Street, East Toowoomba, Toowoomba, Toowoomba Region, Queensland, Australia

History
- Design period: 1870s - 1890s (late 19th century)
- Built: 1875 - 1940s

Site notes
- Architect: Willoughby Powell
- Architectural style: Gothic

Queensland Heritage Register
- Official name: Toowoomba Grammar School
- Type: state heritage (built, landscape)
- Designated: 21 October 1992
- Reference no.: 600850
- Significant period: 1870s-1910s (historical); 1870s-1940s (fabric); 1870s ongoing (social)
- Significant components: garden/grounds, school/school room

Toowoomba Grammar School buildings are a heritage-listed pair of school buildings (School House and Old Hall) at Toowoomba Grammar School at 24–60 Margaret Street, East Toowoomba, Toowoomba, Toowoomba Region, Queensland, Australia. They were designed by Willoughby Powell and built from 1875 to 1940s. It was added to the Queensland Heritage Register on 21 October 1992.

== History ==
The Toowoomba Grammar School was the third grammar school to be constituted under the Grammar Schools Act 1860-1864 following the establishment of Ipswich Grammar School (1863) and Brisbane Grammar School (1869). The foundation stone of the school house was laid by the Hon Charles Lilley on 7 August 1875, and the school was officially opened on 1 February 1877 by the Hon James Taylor, chairman of the board of trustees.

Toowoomba citizens took the first steps to establish a local grammar school in January 1874 when a letter was sent to the colonial secretary, HH Massie, seeking approval for the project, and a subscription list was opened in the Darling Downs Gazette. More than £2700 was raised within weeks from both large and small donations, securing a government grant of £5333 and a loan of £2000.

The board of trustees, elected during June 1874, selected the Old Queens Park as the site for the school. Thirteen acres of this 50-acre site was granted by the government and the remainder was secured by the trustees at 10 pounds an acre as part of the government endowment. The initial board consisted of seven members, three subscribers representatives; William Graham MLA, George Henry Davenport and Samuel George Stephens and four Government representatives: James Taylor MLC, John Frederick McDougall MLC, Gilbert Elliot and Charles James Anderson.

On 21 October 1874 architects were invited to submit designs for the proposed grammar school and a premium of £50 and second prize of £25 were offered. The proposed building was not to exceed £5000 in cost and was to house one large school room, at least 4 classrooms, dormitories for 30–40 boarders, quarters for the headmaster and his family, toilets, bathrooms and servants quarters. A terrace was to be built in front of the main facade and future extensions were to be indicated.

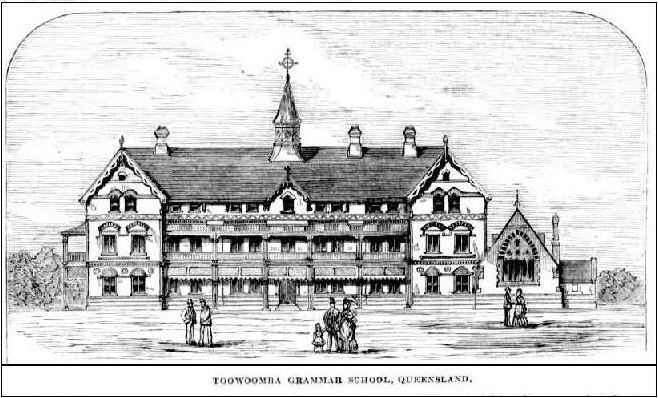
Sketch prior to construction, 1875

The winning design "Veritas" was by the Brisbane architect Willoughby Powell, then a draftsman in the Queensland Public Works Department and previously in the employ of Richard Gailey. Powell moved to Toowoomba to supervise the construction of the school buildings and practiced there until 1877. During this period he designed a variety of buildings including churches, residences and a flour mill. Powell had a further impact on Toowoomba when in 1899 he won the competition for the design of a new Toowoomba Town Hall, the construction of which was supervised by J Marks and Sons.

Separate tenders were called in January 1877 for the erection of a lodge, gymnasium, stables and entrance gates designed by Powell. These structures were subsequently erected at the cost of £530. The main entrance to the school was at the corner of Herries and Mary Street.

The first headmaster of the school was J Macintoch of Camden College, near Sydney, a graduate of Edinburgh University with honours in classics and mathematics. The initial enrolment was forty-four students including twenty boarders with numbers rising to 60 by the end of 1877. Macintoch died accidentally when thrown from a horse on 12 April 1879.

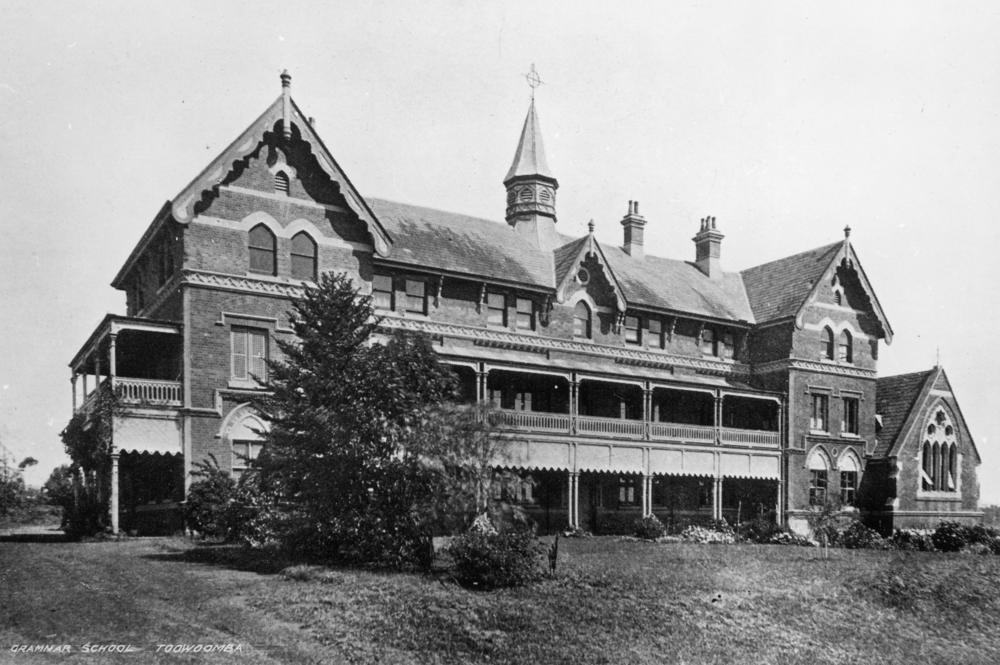
School House and Old Hall, circa 1902

During the next 31 years Toowoomba Grammar School had seven headmasters. Over this period the school experienced financial difficulties as enrolments declined to a record low of 29 in the year 1900. From this low point numbers began to rise so that by August 1906 tenders were being called for additions in brick by J Marks and Son. These additions may have been part of Willoughby Powell's original design. Marks and Son supervised Powell's design for the Toowoomba City Hall, the winner of a design competition in 1899. A small timber building was also erected in 1906 at a cost of £105 for use as a science laboratory. These funds were raised by public subscription, an initiative of Ronald Hamlyn-Harris, the science master who in 1910 became the Curator of the Queensland Museum. Additions to the school, referred to in a 1908 prospectus, included the boy's sitting room, a new classroom, a special dormitory for boys under 12, gas lighting, a new dining room, a headmaster's residence, servants quarters and a new library of 400 volumes.

By 1910 when George Pitty Barbour was appointed headmaster the future of the school was no longer in doubt. He remained as headmaster until 1935 and was responsible for building up Toowoomba Grammar's academic reputation. This was considerably assisted by the achievements of his son Robert Roy Pitty Barbour who in 1920 became the first graduate of the school to receive a Rhodes Scholarship. Improvements to the school between 1925 and 1928, intended to celebrate the school's jubilee, were concentrated on the grounds. Sporting facilities including an oval, swimming pool, new tennis court and an oval pavilion were established. A new chemistry building was constructed in 1925.

A library in memory of Alfred George Stephens, the first student enrolled at Toowoomba Grammar and the literary editor of The Bulletin, was opened in 1937. In 1941 an addition was made to the eastern end of the School House to accommodate the increasing numbers of boarders. In 1947 the architect and planner Karl Langer prepared a master plan for the school which guided building at the school until 1968 which it was superseded by the tenth decade development plan. Buildings constructed during this period include the headmaster's residence, three boarding houses, an assembly hall, new science laboratories, opened on 2 November 1962 by Sir Mark Oliphant, a small hobbies room and a resident master's house. A bathroom and toilet wing and new staircase was added onto the rear of the School House, probably between 1947 and 1953.

Buildings built between 1970 and 1990 include a number of classroom blocks, a gymnasium, an additional boarding house and an arts building. A new library was built in 1989, the WM Dent Library which is adjacent to the assembly hall.

== Description ==
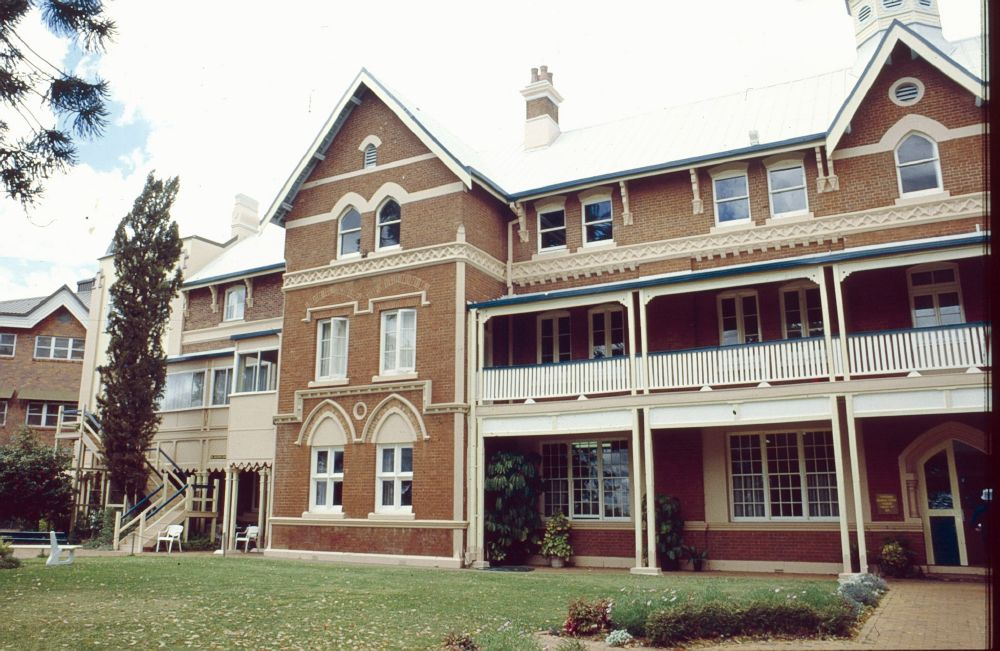
Old School House, 1994

The School House is a three-storeyed brick building with a two-storeyed timber verandah in the centre of the front facade. On the south-western end, adjoining the School House, is the Old Hall. Formerly the main school room, it is a single-storeyed gable roofed building constructed from brick with concrete and stone trim. Sited on a rise in spacious grounds the building overlooks garden beds, large trees, lawns and ovals to the north and west.

The front facade of the building, described as "Domestic Gothic" in style, features contrast concrete and stone trim, label mouldings, hood moulds, and decorative banding. The vertically proportioned timber casement and double hung windows are rectangular or with pointed facade forming an axis which is reinforced by the placement of a decorative gable with central oculus and an octagonal fleche above the line of the doors. The fleche and three brick chimneys are located along the main ridge of roof. The verandah, which has paired timber posts and a simple timber balustrade on the first floor level, runs between projecting gable-fronted bays. Ornamental timber work, such as decorative barge boards and valances, has been replaced by simpler timber members. The roof overhang is supported on timber eaves brackets.

The focus of the front facade of the old hall is a group of pointed arched windows. These windows, with the bulls eye and eight pointed star shaped openings above, form a single composition framed by a hood mould. Stepped or keyed edges provide a contrast in render around window openings and on the chimney and gable end which forms an entry porch on the south western elevation.

The original building, roughly H shaped in plan, has been extended several times. On the north eastern end is the 1906 extension, in a style similar to the original, and the 1941 extension, in a contrasting style. The three storeyed 1941 extension, a rectangular masonry structure with parapet walls concealing the roof, has pilasters with stepped tops ornamenting the external walls. Built onto the rear of the original building, in line with the main entrance, is the shower and toilet block. It is a gable-roofed brick wing with concrete banding at the head of horizontally proportioned windows. A timber staircase, with a timber panelled balustrade and brass handrail, built around the same time as the shower block connects it to the original building.

Two other wings are attached to the rear of the building. The south western wing is three storeys tall with a gable roof. It has brick arches over casement windows to the lower and upper floors and banding at the line of the sill of ground level windows. The two storeyed brick wing, nearer the north eastern end of the building, has a hipped roof.

Internally the school house has rendered masonry walls on the lower levels and painted brick work on the upper level. A number of rooms have pressed metal ceilings. Timber wainscotting of modern design has been added to some ground floor rooms, including the Old Hall. On the second floor the building contains mostly dormitories, large spaces divided by partitions. Ceilings are partly raked and lined with timber boards or pressed metal. Metal tie rods and portions of timber roof trusses are visible below the line of the ceiling.

In the Old Hall the steeply pitched roof is lined with diagonal tongue in groove boards to form a raked ceiling above timber purlins and queen-post trusses. On the walls of this large room hand numerous timber honour boards. A fireplace with a stone mantelpiece is located in the centre of the south western wall. External access to the room is via a porch located adjacent to the southern corner of the room.

== Heritage listing ==
Toowoomba Grammar School was listed on the Queensland Heritage Register on 21 October 1992 having satisfied the following criteria.

The place is important in demonstrating the evolution or pattern of Queensland's history.

Toowoomba Grammar School was the third grammar school to be built in Queensland and demonstrates the impact of the Grammar School Act 1860–64 on the developing of education in Queensland.

The School House and Old Hall, the original buildings built between 1875 and 1877, served for many years as the main buildings of Toowoomba Grammar School. They are a strong representation of the aspirations of the original subscribers and Board of Trustees.

The place is important because of its aesthetic significance.

An Australian adaptation of an English grammar school, the "Domestic Gothic" style buildings were placed in a specious park like setting. This is still discernible today in the open grounds and substantial trees located to the north and west of the School House and the original terrace located in front of the School House.

The buildings are accomplished designs of the architect Willoughby Powell. Prominently located, they are the visual and organisational centre around which the subsequent planning of the school has evolved.

The place has a strong or special association with a particular community or cultural group for social, cultural or spiritual reasons.

A project enthusiastically supported by the local community when first conceived, the new school was a status symbol for the town and surrounding district when it opened and remains a focus in a city noted for the quality and quantity of its educational establishments.

The place has a special association with the life or work of a particular person, group or organisation of importance in Queensland's history.

The buildings are accomplished designs of the architect Willoughby Powell. Powell, who came to Toowoomba as a result of winning the competition for the Toowoomba Grammar School, contributed a number of notable buildings to the town and surrounding centres including the Toowoomba City Hall.
