= Francis Patterson =

Francis Patterson may refer to:

- Francis F. Patterson Jr. (1867–1935), American Republican Party politician
- Francis E. Patterson (1821–1862), United States Army general

== See also ==
- Frank Patterson (disambiguation)
