= Malcolm Geddes =

Irish politician (1832–1916)

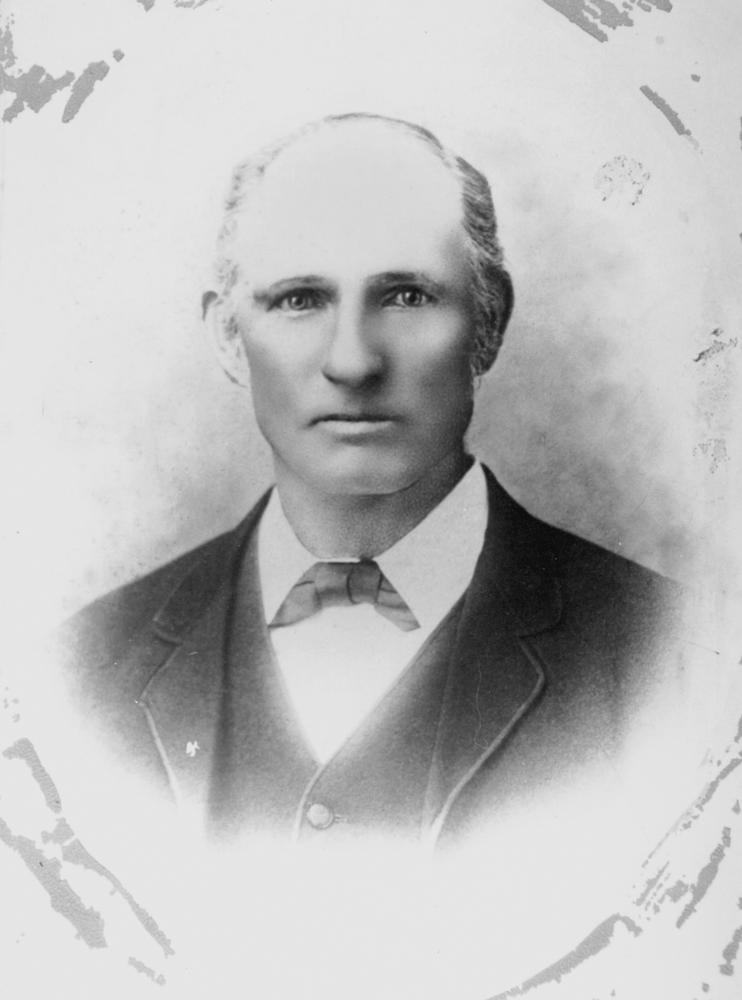
- Malcolm Geddes in 1895.
- Born: 1832; Lurgon, Armagh, Ireland
- Died: 2 July 1916 (aged 83–84); Toowoomba, Queensland
- Occupation: Politician

Malcolm Geddes (1832–1916) was mayor of the City of Toowoomba, Queensland in 1895. He was born in 1832 in Lurgon, Armagh, Ireland, and married Mary McStay in 1855 in Ireland. He died on 2 July 1916 in Toowoomba.
