= Michael Power (Australian politician) =

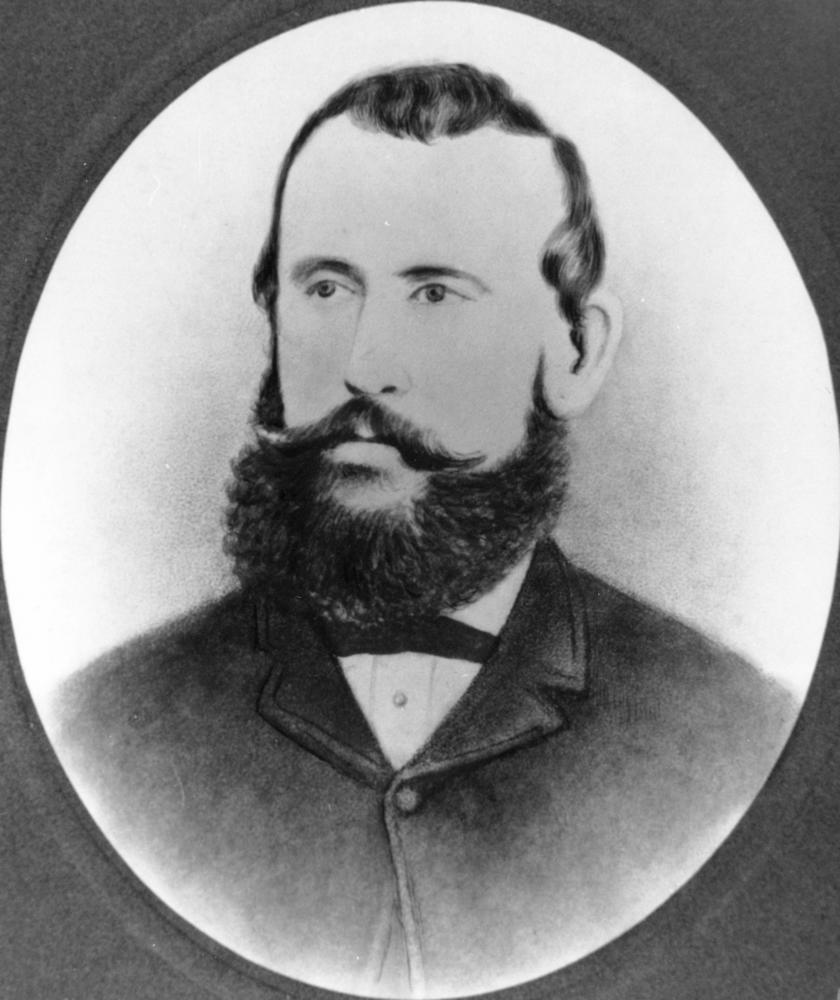
- Michael Power in 1871.
- Died: 20 August 1880
- Occupations: Politician; Innkeeper

Michael Power (died 1880) was an alderman and mayor of Toowoomba, Queensland. He was mayor in 1871 and alderman from 1869 to 1870 and 1872–1873.
