= Port of Townsville =

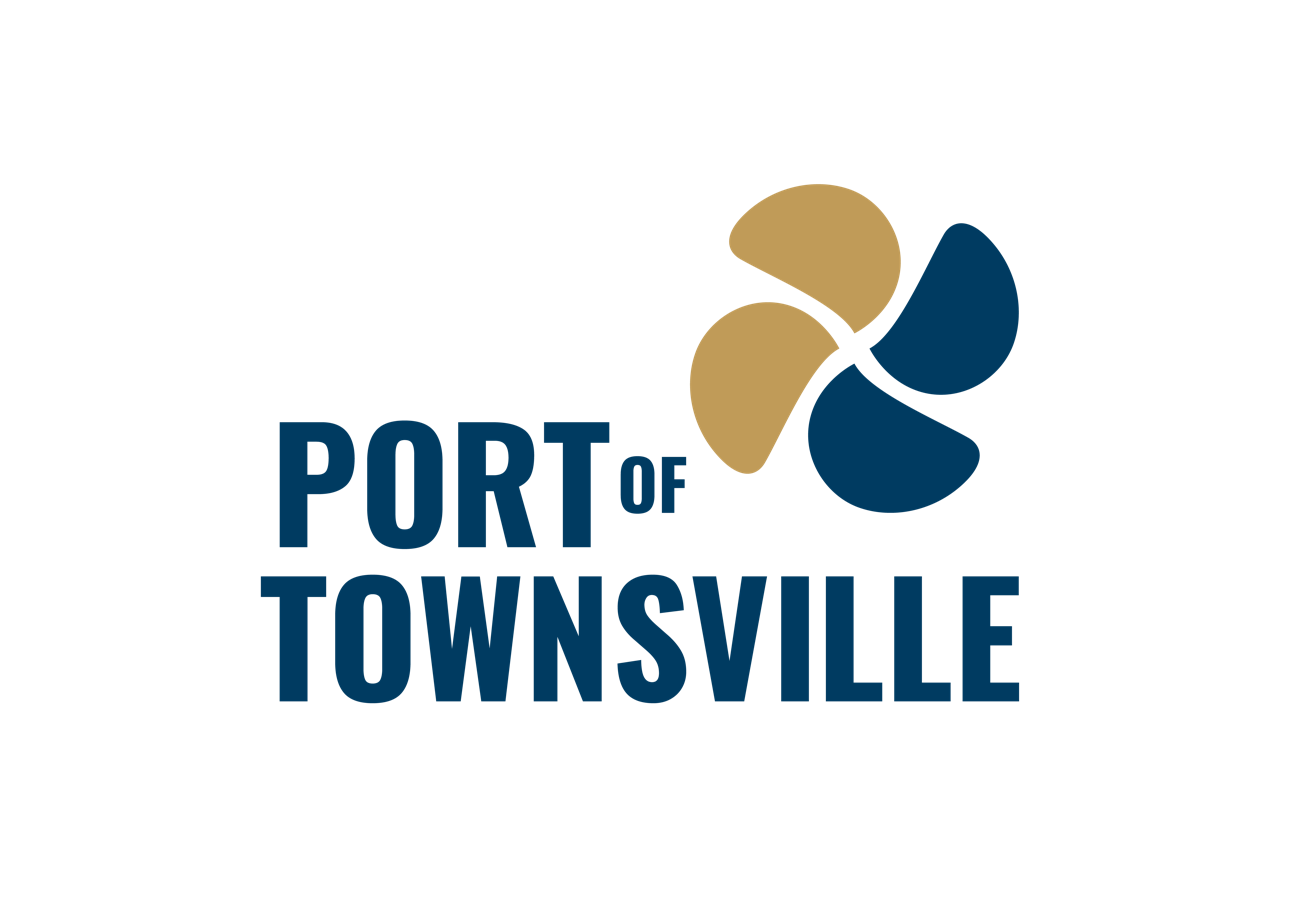
- Interactive map of Port of Townsville
- Location in Australia

Location
- Country: Australia
- Location: Townsville, Queensland
- Coordinates: 19°14′56.75″S 146°50′11.81″E
- UN/LOCODE: AUTSV

Details
- Opened: 1864
- Operated by: Port of Townsville Limited
- Owned by: Queensland Government
- No. of berths: 8
- No. of wharfs: 8
- Draft depth: 13.0 m.
- Employees: 100
- Chief Executive: Ranee Crosby
- Chair: Renita Garard

Statistics
- Annual cargo tonnage: 6,800,000
- Annual container volume: 59,000
- Value of cargo: $8 billion
- Website townsvilleport.com.au

Port of Townsville is a government-owned Corporation and seaport in Townsville, Queensland, Australia. It is the third largest seaport in Queensland after Port of Brisbane and the Port of Gladstone. It is located south of the mouth of Ross Creek and north of the Ross River. Main shipping access is through Cleveland Bay. A second seaport, which only exports sugar is found about 100 kilometres (62 mi) north of Townsville at Lucinda and is also managed by Port of Townsville Limited.

The Port of Townsville is intrinsically linked to the sustainability of the North Queensland economy, and during 2023–24 handled $10 billion in trade. More than 30 different commodity types are imported and exported through Townsville including mineral ores, fertiliser, concentrates, sugar and motor vehicles. Townsville is the number one port in Australia for exports in copper, zinc, lead and sugar.

In 2017, just under 200,000 head of live cattle were shipped from the Port of Townsville, making it the second largest live export port in Australia after Darwin.

The Port of Townsville's Berth 10 was specifically designed to accommodate the Royal Australian Navy's new LHD vessels, HMAS Adelaide and HMAS Canberra and the port also accommodates US Navy on rest and recuperation in Townsville.

== History ==
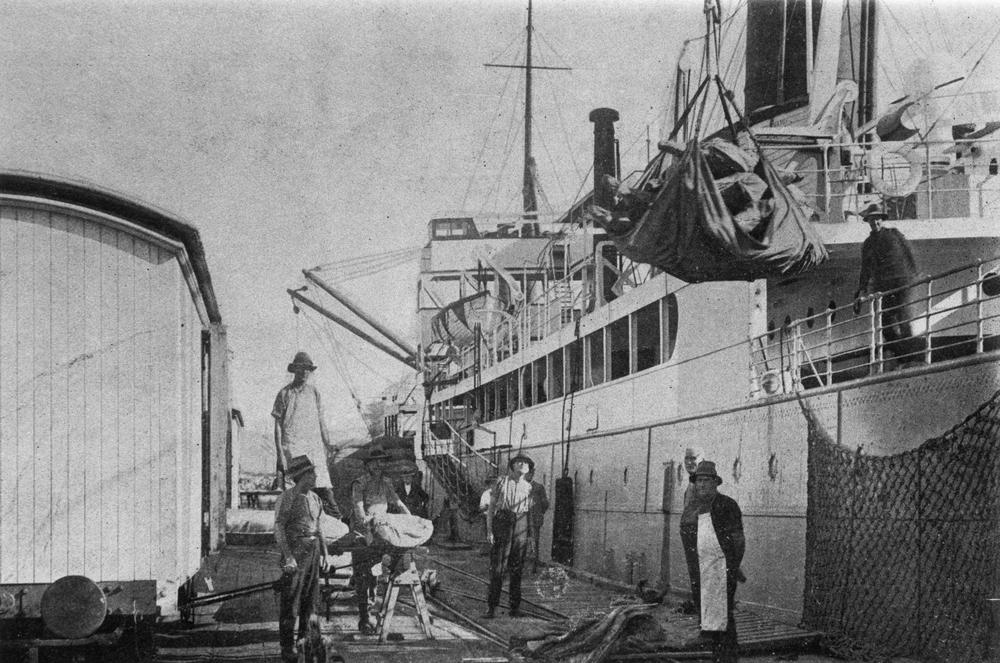
Frozen meat being loaded, 1929

The establishment of the Townsville port site in 1864 was made to serve the hinterland pastoral properties (producing wool and meat products) that later provided the impetus for the birth of Townsville. The establishment, planning and development of the port was undertaken by an entrepreneur, John Melton Black, with financial backing by Robert Towns, a wealthy businessman based in New South Wales.

Black constructed the first wharf in 1864 for facilitating wool exports. The port was officially recognised by the Queensland Government on 10 October 1865, when it was gazetted as a Port of Entry. A year later a township was established, named after Robert Towns.

Development of the port during the early years was slow, mirroring the hesitant growth of the town. This changed during 1867–1871, when discoveries of payable gold in the Queensland hinterland at Palmer River, Ravenswood and Charters Towers rescued the port and the town from decline by opening up new opportunities in goods and passenger trade. This triggered the construction of the first railway lines. The first one to be completed was the one from Townsville to Charters Towers in 1882. By that time the port had emerged as the most important port in northern Australia.

After wool, sugar became the port's second export commodity, starting in 1872. This increased after World War I as global markets grew and more sugar mills were built in Queensland.

By 1874 it was becoming evident that the wharves of the Inner Harbour in Ross Creek would soon be no longer be able to handle the anticipated increased maritime traffic and larger ships. 1874 saw the construction of a breakwater as a first step towards increasing the port's capacity. A year later, William Nesbit, Engineer of Harbors and Rivers, Queensland Government, submitted an ambitious plan to increase the port's capacity through the construction of several long jetties that would also serve as breakwaters, to the west and east of Ross Creek. This was the beginning of the Outer Harbour and Nesbit's plan was to be the blueprint for port expansion during the decades to follow. Development of the Inner Harbour finally ceased around 1911.

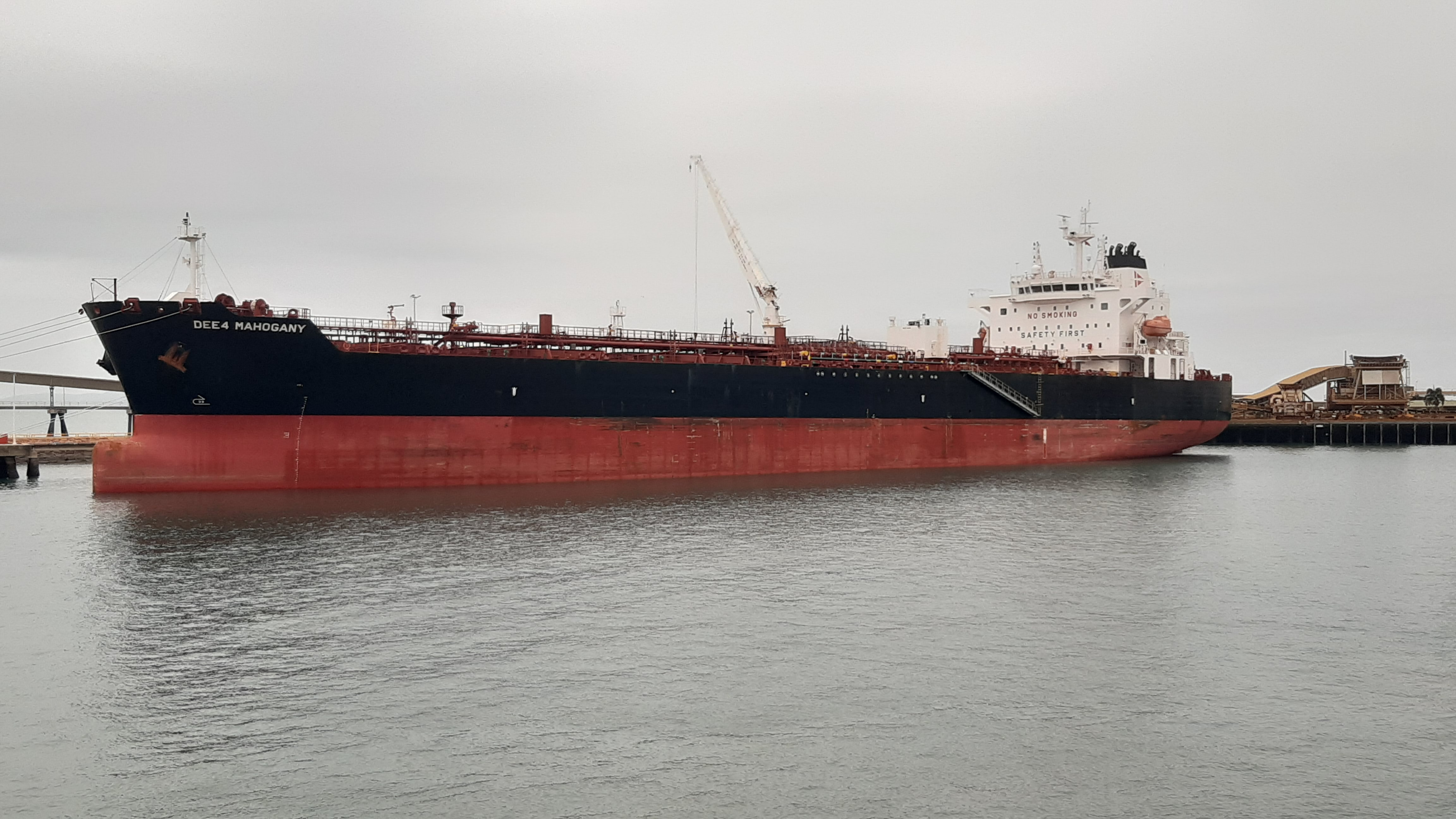
An oil/chemical tanker docked at the port in June 2025

On 1 January 1896, a new controlling and managing authority was established, the Townsville Harbour Board. During the same month, Cyclone Sigma struck Townsville, causing significant damage to the port.

The increase in the numbers of travelling public and the expansion of the cargo trade led to the emergence of a new type of ship in the 1880s, which had both cargo capacity and comfortable passenger accommodation. The port became an important part in the development of cargo and passenger routes, with a number of shipping companies competing against each other, making an effort to increase their share of the market through efficient operations and the introduction of ships that were getting larger, faster and more luxurious. Soon after World War II the passenger ship era came to an end because of escalating costs and increased competition from road and rail transport. Recent years saw the return of the passenger industry in the form of cruise ships.

During the 1920s wool, frozen meat, tallow and sugar were the dominant exports, with coal and later oil as significant imports. A 1923 chance discovery of immense deposits of copper, zinc, lead and silver at an outcrop 900 kilometres (560 mi) west of Townsville accelerated further growth of the port. Mount Isa Mines were established a year later and after the completion of a rail link the first mineral exports started flowing through the port. Today, the port remains a major export hub for minerals mined in North Queensland.

During World War II the Townsville region was a significant location that saw the increase of port activities. Its primary function was to manage the transit of troops, war materials, equipment and bulk fuel supplies for use by the Allied forces in the South-West Pacific. At the same time, the normal pre-war trade had to be maintained to the best possible advantage of its customers.

More than one million tonnes of war supplies and 300,000 tonnes of fuel passed through the port until 1943.

The port accommodated all classes of vessels, including naval and army vessels, landing ships, lighters, troop carriers, hospital ships and varied types of cargo vessels, with Liberty Ships predominant. In 1943 the most familiar national flags were American, Dutch, British, Norwegian and Greek. The port had seven working berths and these were kept fully occupied, with a never-ending queue of ships anchored in Cleveland Bay.

With the tide of the Pacific War turning in favour of the Allies, shipping at the port gradually started decreasing from 1944, and by 1945 some semblance of pre-war normality had been achieved.

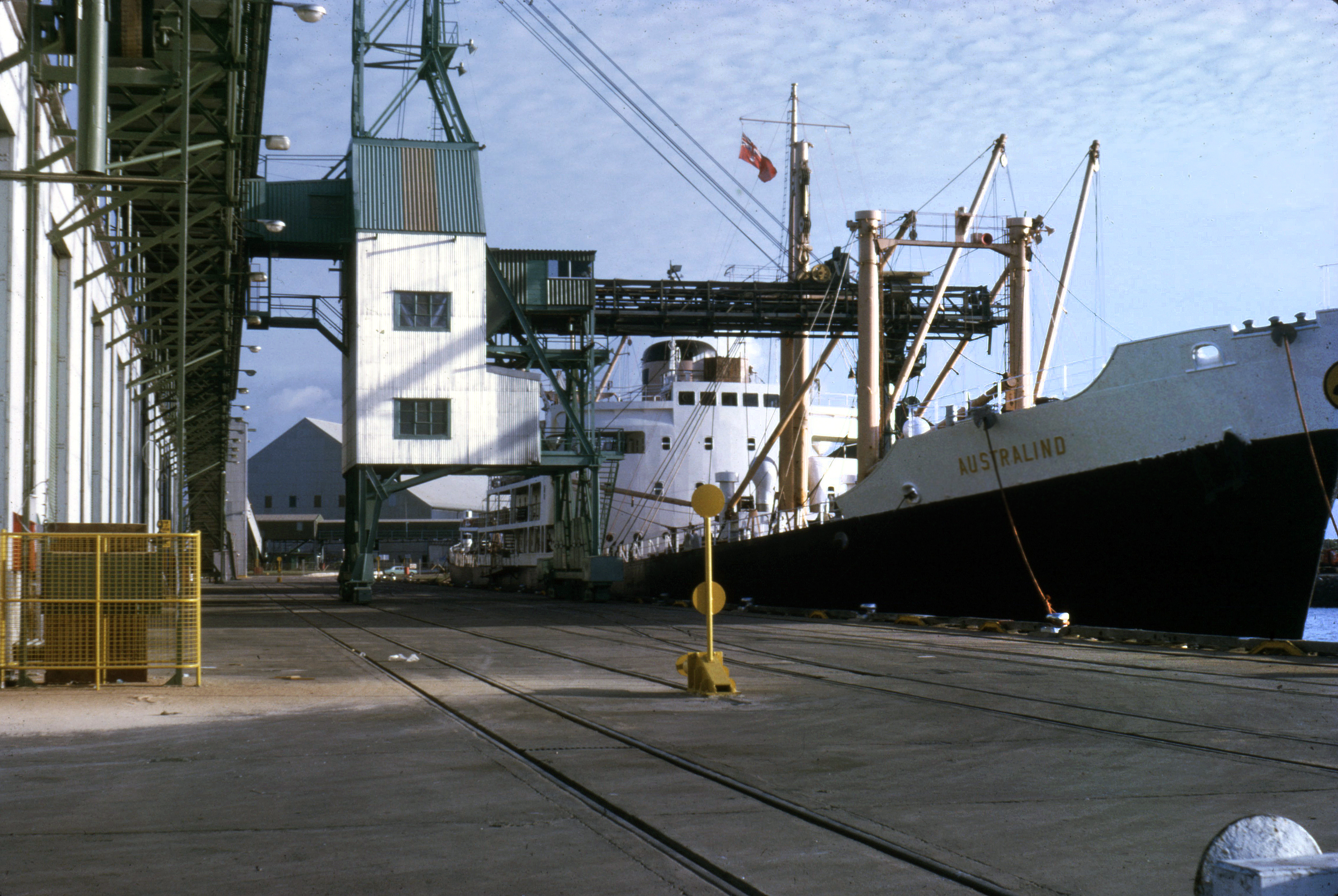
Townsville Harbour, 1973

Planning for the port’s first bulk sugar terminal began in the early 1950s and in June 1959 the first sugar from the Burdekin mills was received by the completed shed. Two months later saw the first loading of bulk sugar for overseas. By 1965 a second sugar shed was taken into use, followed by a third one after 2000.

In 1967, reclamation works of an additional 170 acres provided space for expansion and the construction of oil facilities, development of prawn and fish processing works, an LPG terminal and bulk steel store. In 1969, the first roll on/roll off vessels arrived at a new Berth 10 with imported containers and vehicles. In 1974, the first export of nickel ore took place. In 1980, the reclamation of another 9.1 hectares adjacent to the eastern breakwater allowed for a new container terminal, LPG terminals and an aqua ammonia terminal. During the early 1980s a new eastern breakwater was built and the commercial fishing fleet was moved to Ross Creek. The fleet was relocated again, in 2012, to a new marine precinct east of the Port, and a year later a new port access road was taken into use, allowing direct access to the Port by triple trailer road trains from Charters Towers and other parts of the outback.

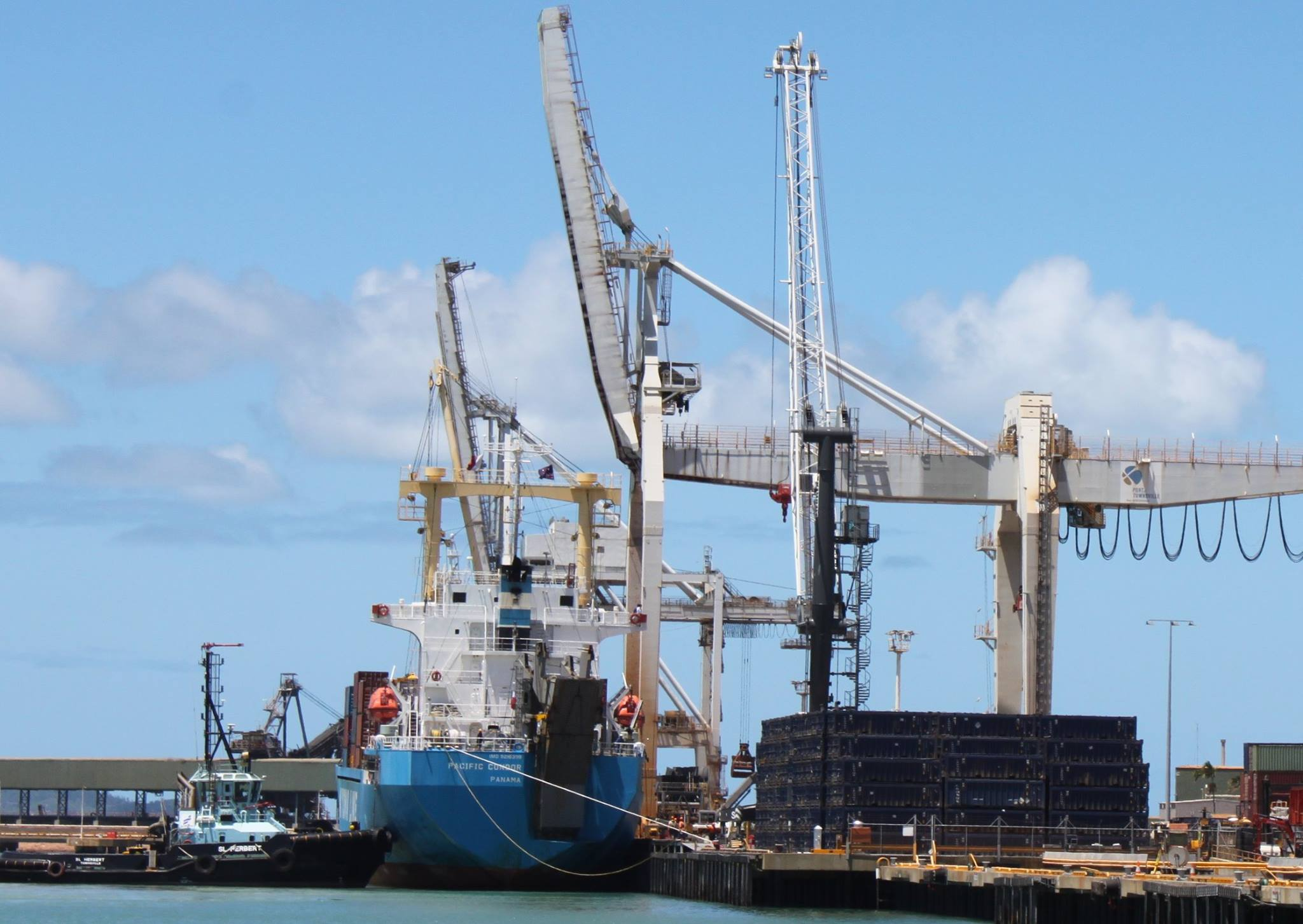
Pacific Condor, 2016

In 1997, BHP built Berth 11 to handle mineral concentrates from the Cannington Mine. In 2013, the $85 million project Berth 10 upgrade and construction of the Quayside Terminal for cruise ships and navy ships was completed.

In July 2010, the port shipped the first iron ore to depart from the East Coast of Australia since the 1800s. In August 2012, it was reported that the port was operating at about one third of its capacity.

The largest ship to dock at the port, the 294-metre Queen Elizabeth docked in January 2025.

== Expansion ==
The Townsville port recently underwent an expansion in the Outer Harbour including the $85 million upgrade of Berth 10 (and construction of Quayside Terminal for cruise ships) as well as an $85 million upgrade of Berth 8. A project to upgrade Berth 4, valued at $55 million, is currently underway and due for completion at the end of 2017.

== See also ==
- List of Panamax ports
- List of ports in Australia
