= Matthew Keeffe =

Australian politician

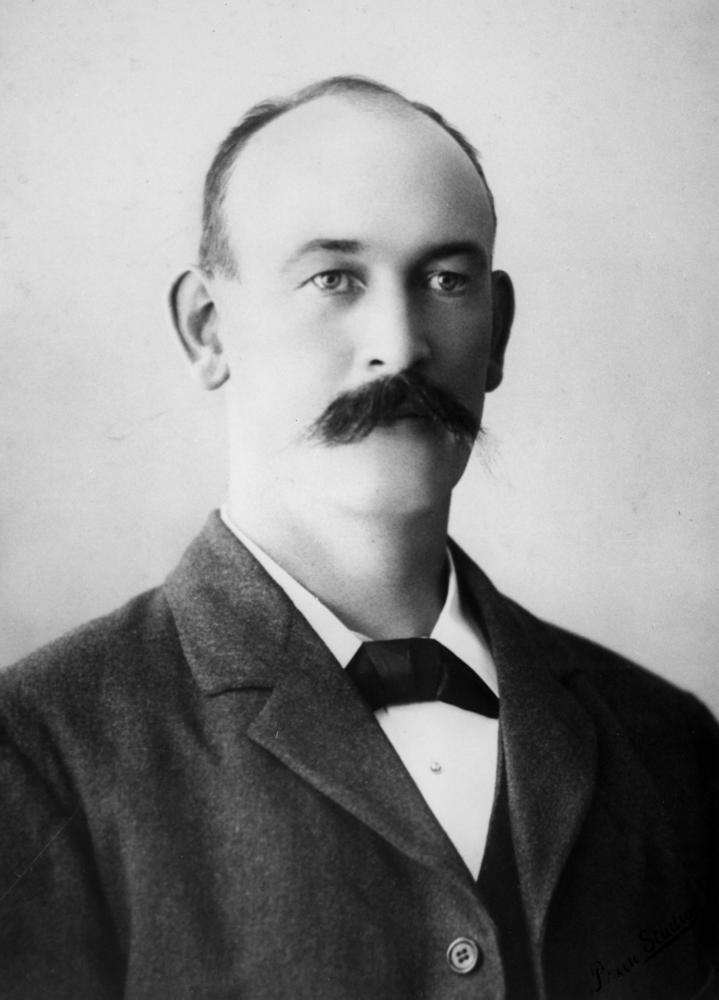
- Matthew Keeffe in 1900.
- Born: Kilkenny, Ireland
- Died: 22 March 1924; Maryvale, Queensland (Southern Downs Region)

Matthew Keeffe (died 1924) was a hotel manager, policeman and farmer who was elected mayor of Toowoomba, Queensland in 1900. Born in Kilkenny, Ireland, he emigrated to Queensland during the 1870s and joined the Queensland Police in 1879, becoming a sergeant before retiring in 1889 in Toowoomba. He then entered the hotel business, and was elected as an alderman for the Toowoomba City Council from 1896 to 1901, serving as mayor in 1900. He died on 22 March 1924 at Maryvale, Queensland (Southern Downs Region), where he had taken up agriculture.

As mayor, on 12 December 1900, Keeffe officially opened the Toowoomba City Hall, which has since been listed on the Queensland Heritage Register.
