= John Atkinson (Australian politician) =

Australian politician (1850–1943)

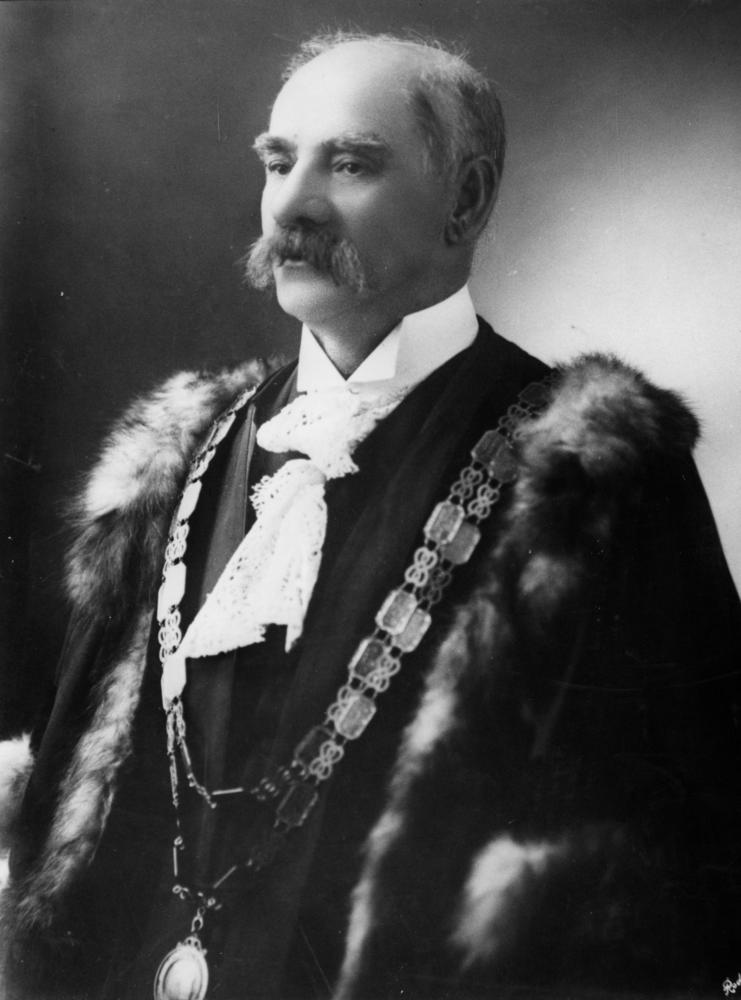
- John Atkinson in 1913
- Born: 21 March 1850; Cumberland, England
- Died: 19 May 1943 (aged 93); Toowoomba, Australia
- Occupation: Politician

John Atkinson (21 March 1850 – 19 May 1943) was an English-born Australian politician who was the mayor of Toowoomba, Queensland in 1913 and a Queensland wrestling champion. Born in Cumberland, England, he came to Australia in 1878 took jobs first as a schoolteacher and then as a businessman. He was a Toowoomba City Council alderman in 1907 and from 1910 to 1912. He died in Toowoomba on 19 May 1943, at the age of 93.
