= Townsville Harbour Board =

Former Australian port authority

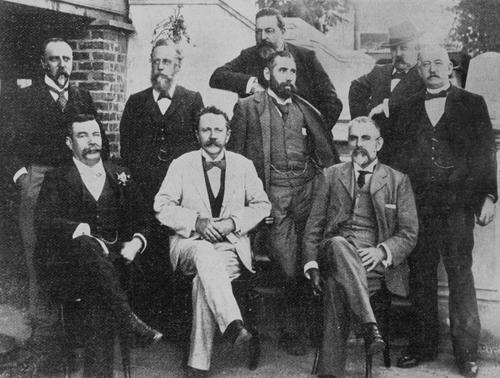
- Members of the Harbour Board in 1901

Type
- Type: Elected board of the Port of Townsville

History
- Established: 1 January 1896
- Disbanded: 1 January 1987
- Succeeded by: Townsville Port Authority
- Seats: 11 elected members

Elections
- First election: February 1896
- Last election: April 1955

The Townsville Harbour Board (also known as the Harbour Board of Townsville) was the authority responsible for managing the Port of Townsville, a seaport in Townsville, Queensland, Australia.

Until 1956, the board was directly elected, and had members representing several local government areas (LGAs). The last election was in 1955.

The board was abolished in 1987 and replaced by the Townsville Port Authority (now known as Port of Townsville Limited).

== History ==
On 10 August 1893, a conference of LGAs met in Charters Towers to discuss the establishment of a Harbour Board for the Port of Townsville. According to the Brisbane Courier, it was agreed that the board should be composed of "two representatives from the Townsville Municipality, one from the Thuringowa Division, two from the Charters Towers Municipality, one from the Dalrymple Division, one from the Ravenswood Division, one from the Hughenden Division, one from the Hughenden Municipality, one to represent shipping interests, and two nominated by the government". However, the final model reduced the amount of LGAs represented to only include Townsville, Thuringowa, Charters Towers and Hughenden.

A bill to formally create the board passed parliament in late December 1895, and it was formally established on 1 January 1896, with the first election in February of that year. Four members were elected, along with two government-appointed members, one member from the Chamber of Commerce and one council-appointed member for each of the four LGAs represented by the board.

The Australian Labor Party endorsed candidates for the elections, as did several local parties.

== Elected members ==
| Year | Townsville | | Charters Towers | | Hughenden | Thuringowa |
| Year | Member | Member | Member | Member | Member | Member |
|---|---|---|---|---|---|---|
| 1933 | Thomas Barry (Labor) | Percy Willmett (Progressive) | J. W. Ward (Ind.) | J. J. Williams (Ind.) | J. V. Suter (Ind.) | C. W. Wordworth (Ind.) |

== Election results ==
=== 1933 ===
1933 Queensland local elections: Townsville Harbour Board
| Party | Candidate | Votes | % | ±% |
|---|---|---|---|---|
| Labor | Thomas Barry (elected) | 5,703 | 25.6 | |
| Progressive | Percy Willmett (elected) | 5,416 | 24.3 | |
| Progressive | John Edward Clegg | 4,403 | 19.7 | |
| Labor | Edward James Copp | 3,551 | 15.9 | |
| Independent | James Andrew Hackett | 3,229 | 14.5 | |
| Total formal votes | | 22,302 | | |
