= Job Eagles Stone =

Australian politician from Queensland

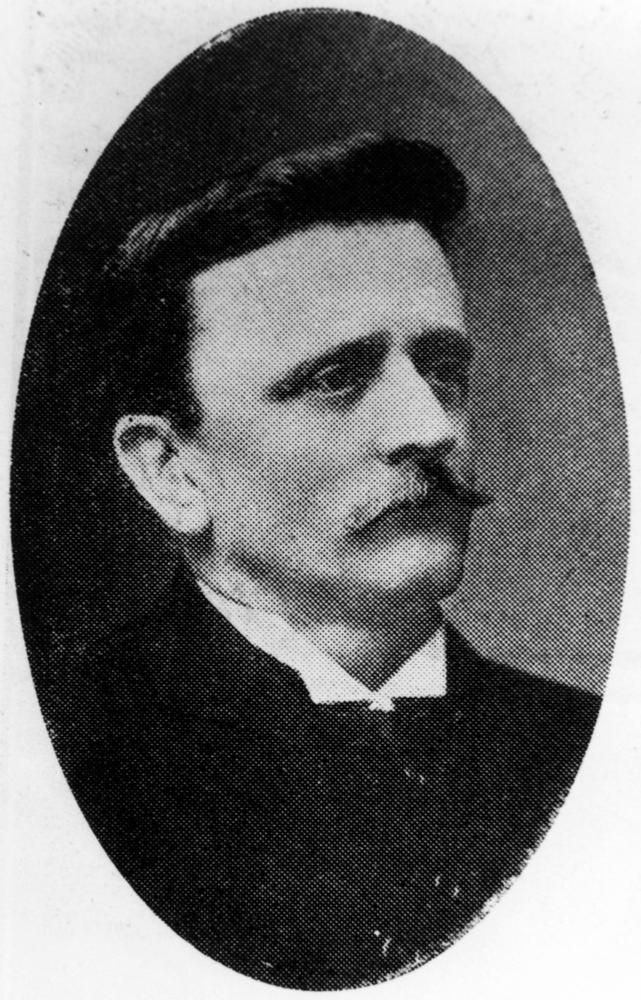
- Job Stone in 1909.
- Born: 5 November 1860; Kenilworth, Warwickshire, England
- Died: 13 September 1935 (aged 74); Toowoomba, Queensland

Job Eagles Stone (1860–1935) was a mayor of Toowoomba, Queensland in 1909. Born in Kenilworth, Warwickshire, England, he came to Australia as a boy and settled with his family in Toowoomba. From his first job as a newspaper boy, he worked his way up to eventually owning a large printing and bookselling business. Aside from his service as mayor, he was an alderman on the Toowoomba City Council in 1907–1911, 1924, and 1930–1933. He died in Toowoomba on 13 September 1935.
