= List of mayors of Toowoomba =

Mayors of Toowoomba
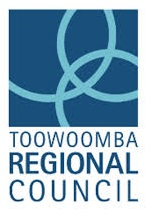
- Toowoomba Regional Council Logo
- Incumbent; Geoff McDonald since 21 July, 2023
- Style: Councillor
- Term length: 4 years
- Inaugural holder: William Henry Groom
- Formation: 15 March 2008

This is a list of mayors of the City of Toowoomba and the Toowoomba Region, Queensland, Australia. In March 2008 the City of Toowoomba was amalgamated with the Shires of Crows Nest, Rosalie, Jondaryan, Cambooya, Clifton, Millmerran, and Pittsworth to form the Toowoomba Region.

== 1861–present ==
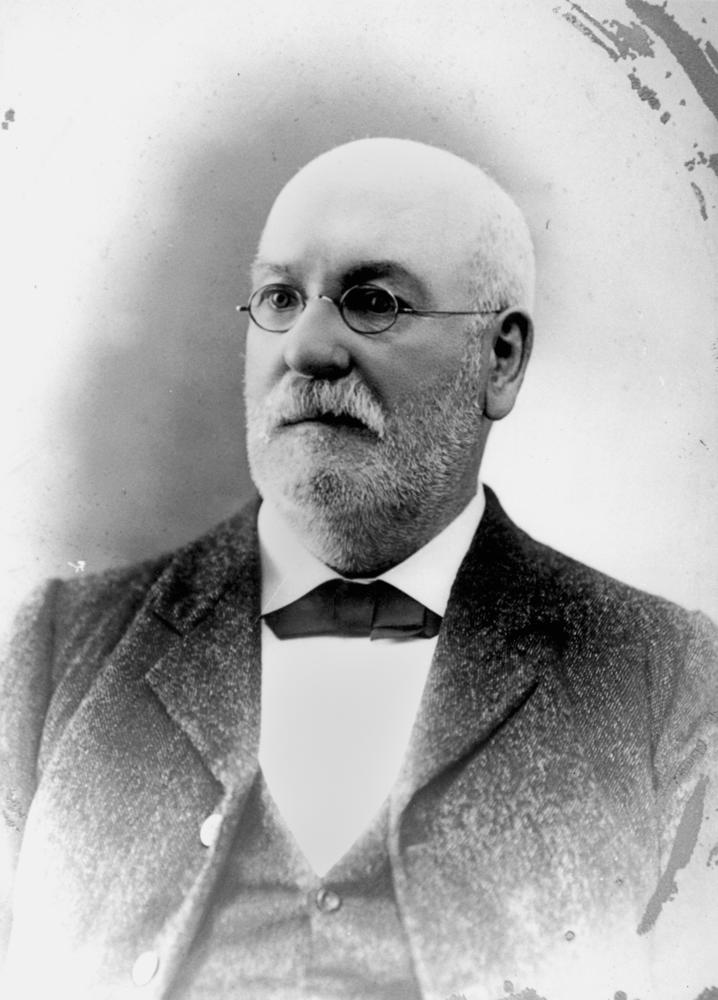
John McLeish, mayor in 1881

#	Mayor	Term	Notes
1	William Henry Groom	1861–1862	
2	Abraham Hamilton Thompson	1863–1864	
3	William Henry Groom	1864	
4	Thomas George Robinson	1865	
5	Edwin Woodward Robinson	1866	
6	William Henry Groom	1867	
7	Joseph Wonderley	1868–1869	
8	Henry Spiro	1870	
9	Michael Power	1871	
10	Richard Godsall	1872	
11	Henry Spiro	1873	
12	Robert Aland	1874–1875	
13	John Garget	1876–1878	
14	Richard Godsall	1879	
15	Joseph McIntyre	1880	
16	John McLeish	1881	
17	James Campbell	1882	
18	William Henry Groom	1883–1884	
19	John Garget	1885	
20	Charles Campbell	1886	
21	John Fogarty	1887	
22	Thomas Trevethan	1888	
23	Edmund Boland	1889	
24	James Taylor	1890	Also served in the Queensland Legislative Assembly and Queensland Legislative Council
25	Gilbert Gostwyck Cory	1891	
26	William Thorn	1893	
27	Archibald Munro	1894	
28	Malcolm Geddes	1895	
29	Alexander Mayes	1896	
30	Edmund Boland	1897	
31	Robert Sinclair	1898	
32	Hugh Campbell Pointer	1899	
33	Matthew Keeffe	1900	
34	Charles Rowbotham	1901–1902	
35	Alexander Mayes	1903	
36	Thomas Burstow	1904	
37	Bernard Joseph Beirne	1905	
38	Edwin John Godsall	1906–1907	
39	Thomas Burstow	1907	
40	Henry Webb	1908	
41	Job Eagles Stone	1909	
42	Vernon Redwood	1910	
43	Henry King Alford	1911–1912	
44	John Atkinson	1913	
45	David Boland	1914	
46	Henry Webb	1915	
47	Alfred David McWaters	1916	
48	Alexander Mayes	1917	
49	Dr. Thomas Price	1918	
50	Thomas Burstow	1919	
51	Albert Richard Godsall	1920–1924	
52	James Douglas Annand	1924–1930	
53	Frank Paterson	1930–1933	
54	James Douglas Annand	1933–1949	
55	Dr. Alexander Roy McGregor	1949–1952	
56	James Douglas Annand	1952	
57	Mervyn Anderson	1952–1958	
58	Jack McCafferty	1958–1967	
59	Nell Elizabeth Robinson	1967–1981	First female mayor in Queensland
60	Jack Duggan	1981	
61	Clive Berghofer	1982–1992	
62	Ross Miller	1993–1996	
63	Tony Bourke	1997–2000	
64	Di Thorley	2000–2008	
–	New amalgamated council	March 2008	
65	Peter Taylor	2008–2012	Formerly the mayor of the Shire of Jondaryan.
66	Paul Antonio	2012–2023	
67	Geoff McDonald	2023 - present	

== Election results ==
=== 1933 ===
1933 Queensland mayoral elections: Toowoomba
Party	Candidate	Votes	%	±%
Independent Country	James Douglas Annand		<50.0	
Independent	Frank Paterson			
Independent	Albert Richard Godsall			
Independent Country gain from Independent		Swing		
