= Paul Antonio =

Australian politician

Mayor of Toowoomba Region
- In office 28 April 2012 – 21 July 2023
- Deputy: Mike Williams; Carol Taylor; Geoff McDonald
- Preceded by: Peter Taylor
- Succeeded by: Geoff McDonald

Deputy Mayor of Toowoomba Region
- In office 15 March 2008 – 28 April 2012
- Succeeded by: Mike Williams

Councillor for Toowoomba Region
- In office 15 March 2008 – 28 April 2012

Personal details
- Party: Independent
- Other political affiliations: Liberal National; National Party
- Education: Queensland Agricultural College
- Occupation: Farmer

Paul Antonio is a former Australian politician who served as Mayor of Toowoomba, Queensland from 2012 until his retirement in 2023. Prior to his election to the mayoralty in 2012, Antonio served as Deputy Mayor from 2008 to 2012, and as Mayor of Millmerran Shire Council for eight years until its 2008 amalgamation into the new Toowoomba Region.
