= Alfred McWaters =

Australian politician from Queensland

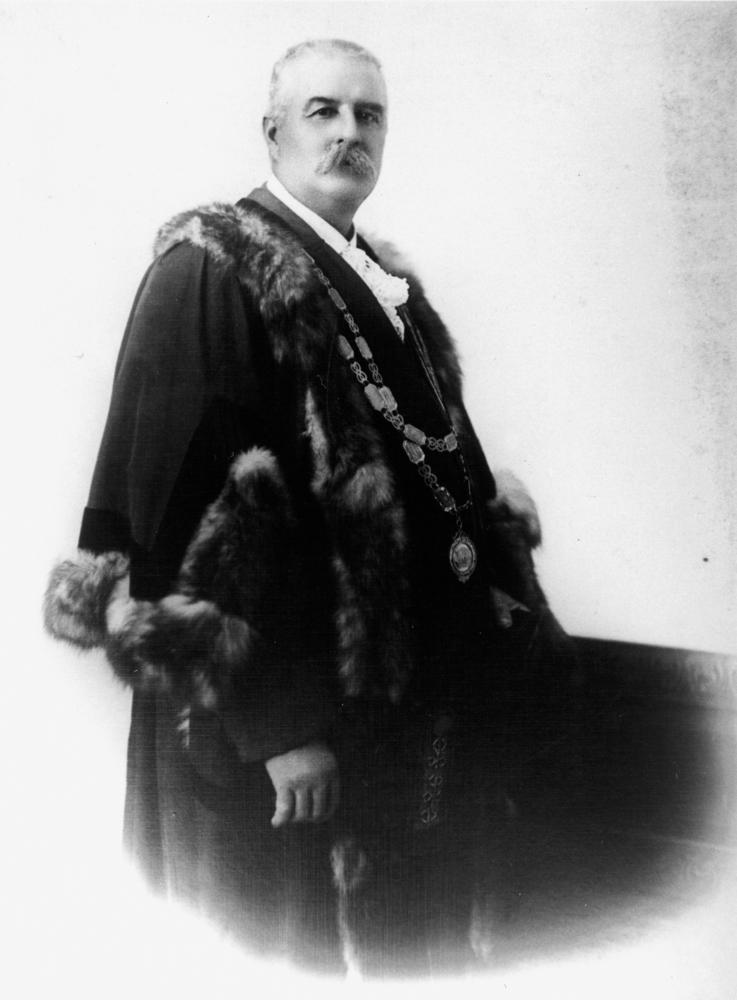
- Alfred McWaters in 1916.
- Born: Ballarat, Victoria
- Occupations: Politician; Farmer

Alfred David McWaters was mayor of Toowoomba, Queensland in 1916. He was also an alderman on the Toowoomba City Council in 1914–1915 and 1918–1921. He was born in Ballarat, Victoria and worked as a grazier before moving to Toowoomba.
