= 1933 Queensland local elections =

Local elections in Queensland, Australia

← 1930	1−29 April 1933	1936 →

The 1933 Queensland local elections were held throughout April 1933 to elect the mayors and councils of almost all local government areas (LGAs) in Queensland, Australia. No election was held for Brisbane City Council, which had last had an election in 1931 and did not have another one scheduled until 1934.

Not all LGAs had their elections on the same day − some were held on 1 April, while others held later in the month on 29 April.

Notable results included the Independent Reform Party defeating the Citizens' United Party and gaining a "sweeping majority" on Warwick Shire Council, as well as James Douglas Annand being elected mayor of Toowoomba "without addressing a meeting, canvassing, advertising, or in any way spending a penny on the contest". During the campaign for Rockhampton Harbour Board, a "well-known public man" who was contesting the election was assaulted at his home on the night of 5 April, requiring medical attention.

The Tamborine Shire Council election was postponed.

== Political parties ==
A number of political parties endorsed candidates for the elections.

- Australian Labor Party
- Citizens Party
- Citizens' United Party
- Communist Party of Australia
- Independent Reform Party
- People's Party
- Progressive Party

== See also ==
- 1933 Queensland mayoral elections
- 1933 Townsville City Council election
