= Frank Paterson =

Australian surveyor and politician

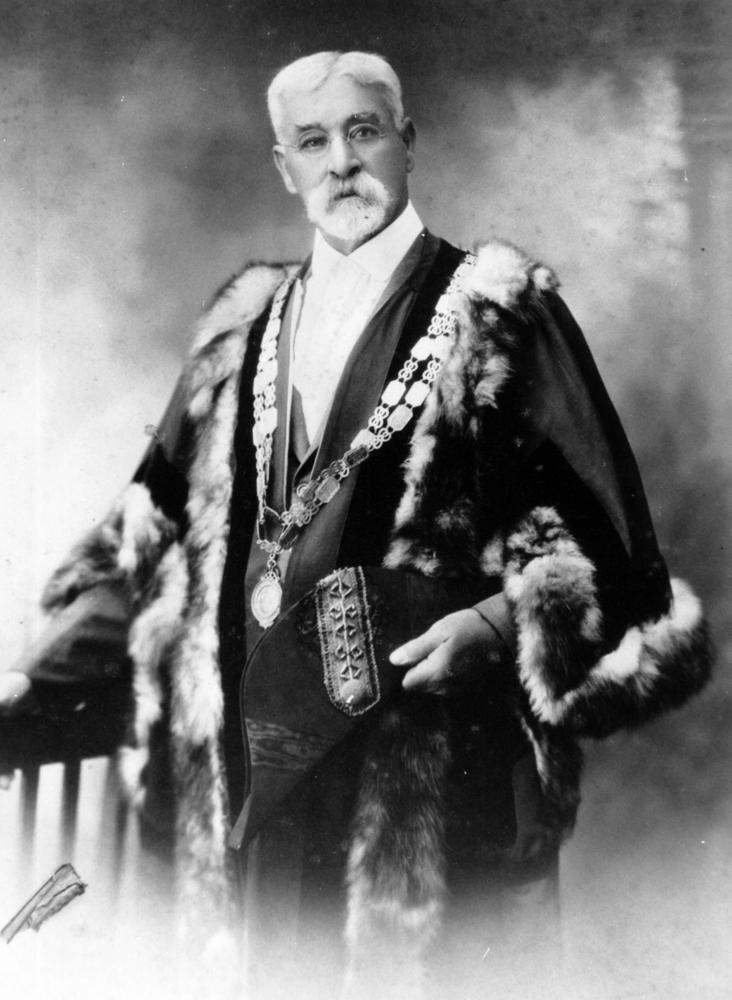
- Frank J. Paterson ca. 1931.
- Occupation(s): Surveyor; Mayor

Frank J. Paterson was an Australian surveyor and mayor of Toowoomba, Queensland from 1931 to 1933.
