= Geoff McDonald (mayor) =

Australian politician

Councillor Geoff McDonald
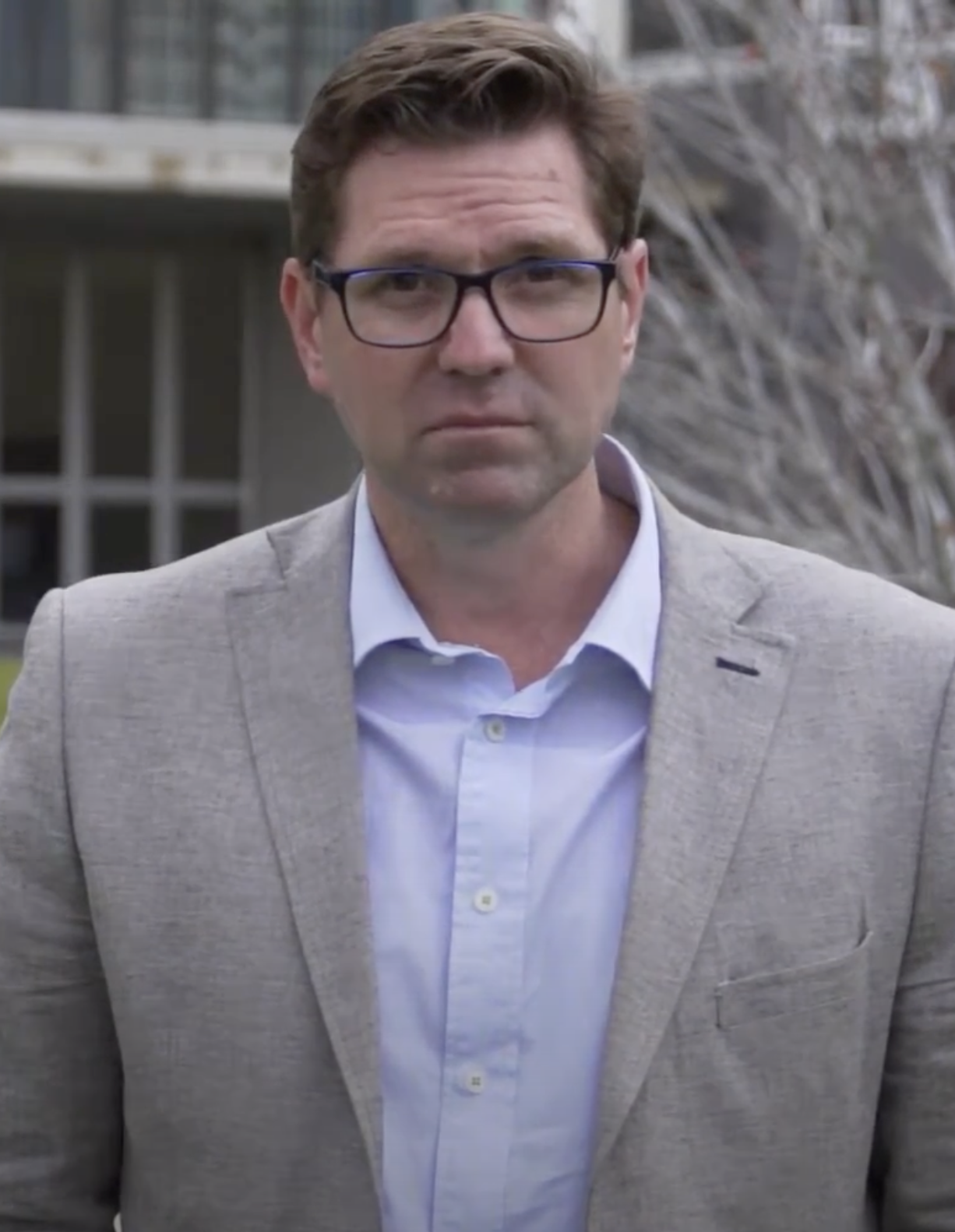
- McDonald in 2018

3rd Mayor of Toowoomba Region
- Incumbent
- Assumed office 21 July 2023
- Deputy: Rebecca Vonhoff
- Preceded by: Paul Antonio

Deputy Mayor of Toowoomba Region
- In office 23 April 2020 – 21 July 2023
- Succeeded by: Rebecca Vonhoff

Councillor for Toowoomba Region
- In office 28 April 2012 – 21 July 2023

Personal details
- Born: Geoffrey Charles McDonald Toowoomba, Queensland
- Party: Independent
- Occupation: Businessman, politician
- Website: tr.qld.gov.au

Geoffrey Charles McDonald is an Australian politician who has served as Mayor of Toowoomba, Queensland since 2023. He was elected to the mayoralty by councillors after retirement of his predecessor, Paul Antonio.

Prior to his election to the mayoralty, McDonald served as a councillor for the Toowoomba Region between 2012 and 2023, and as deputy mayor since 2020.

He is the son of former Queensland State of Origin coach and administrator John McDonald.
