= Walter Burley Griffin Incinerator =

Walter Burley Griffin Incinerator may refer to:

- Walter Burley Griffin Incinerator, Ipswich
- Walter Burley Griffin Incinerator, Willoughby
