= Ernest Greenway =

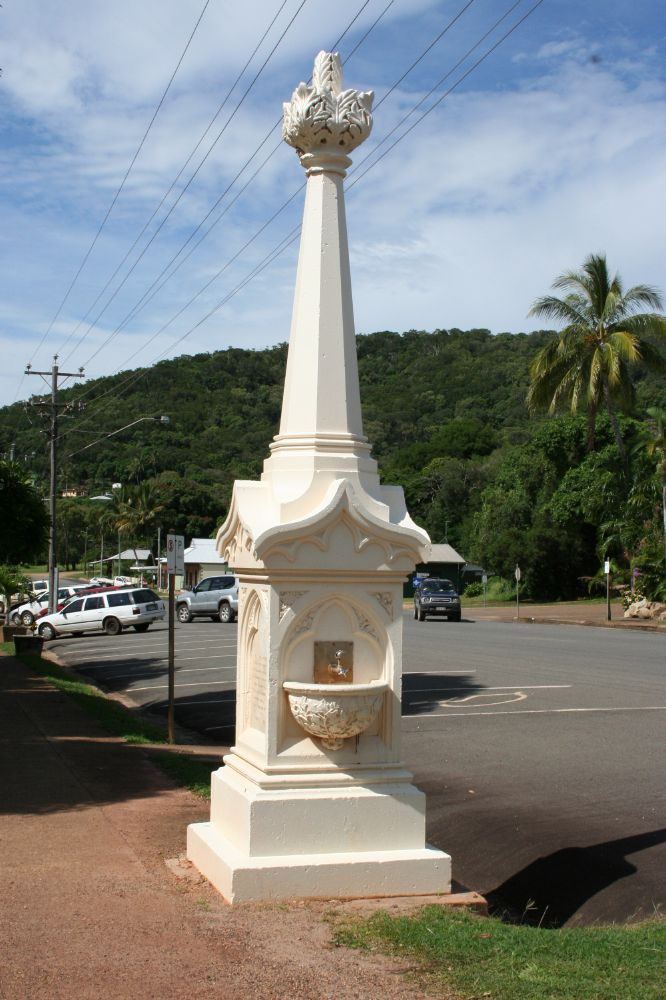
Mary Watson's Monument, Cooktown, 2010

Ernest Greenway (1861–1934) was a stonemason in Ipswich, Queensland, Australia. His work is part of many heritage-listed sites in Queensland.

== Early life ==
Ernest Greenway was a descendant of early colonial architect Francis Greenway who designed many of the public buildings in New South Wales during Lachlan Macquarie's time as Governor of New South Wales. Ernest Greenway learnt his trade in England and migrated to Queensland in 1882.

== Stonemasonry ==
Greenway established a stonemasonry business in Nicholas Street, Ipswich. He later moved to Grey Street and finally to Limestone Street in 1891. His business functioned from the Limestone Street site until 1934.

He designed so many monuments for Cooktown that the Cooktown Independent described him as "half a Cooktownite".

== Later life ==
Greenway died at his residence Kyeewa in York Street, East Ipswich on Friday 5 January 1934. His funeral was held on Saturday 6 January 1934 at the Central Congregational Church.

== Works ==
- Mary Watson's Monument, Cooktown (1886)
- Memorial to John MacFarlane, Queen's Park, Ipswich
- monuments in the Cooktown Cemetery (various years)
- monuments in the Croydon Cemetery (various years)
