= Newtown, Queensland =

Newtown, Queensland may refer to:

- Newtown, Queensland (Ipswich)
- Newtown, Queensland (Toowoomba)
