= Burley Griffin =

Burley Griffin may refer to:

- Walter Burley Griffin (1876–1937), American architect and landscape architect
- Lake Burley Griffin, a lake in Canberra, Australia, a monument to Griffin

== See also ==
- Burley Griffin Way
- Walter Burley Griffin Incinerator, Ipswich
