= Basin Pocket, Queensland =

Basin Pocket Ipswich, Queensland
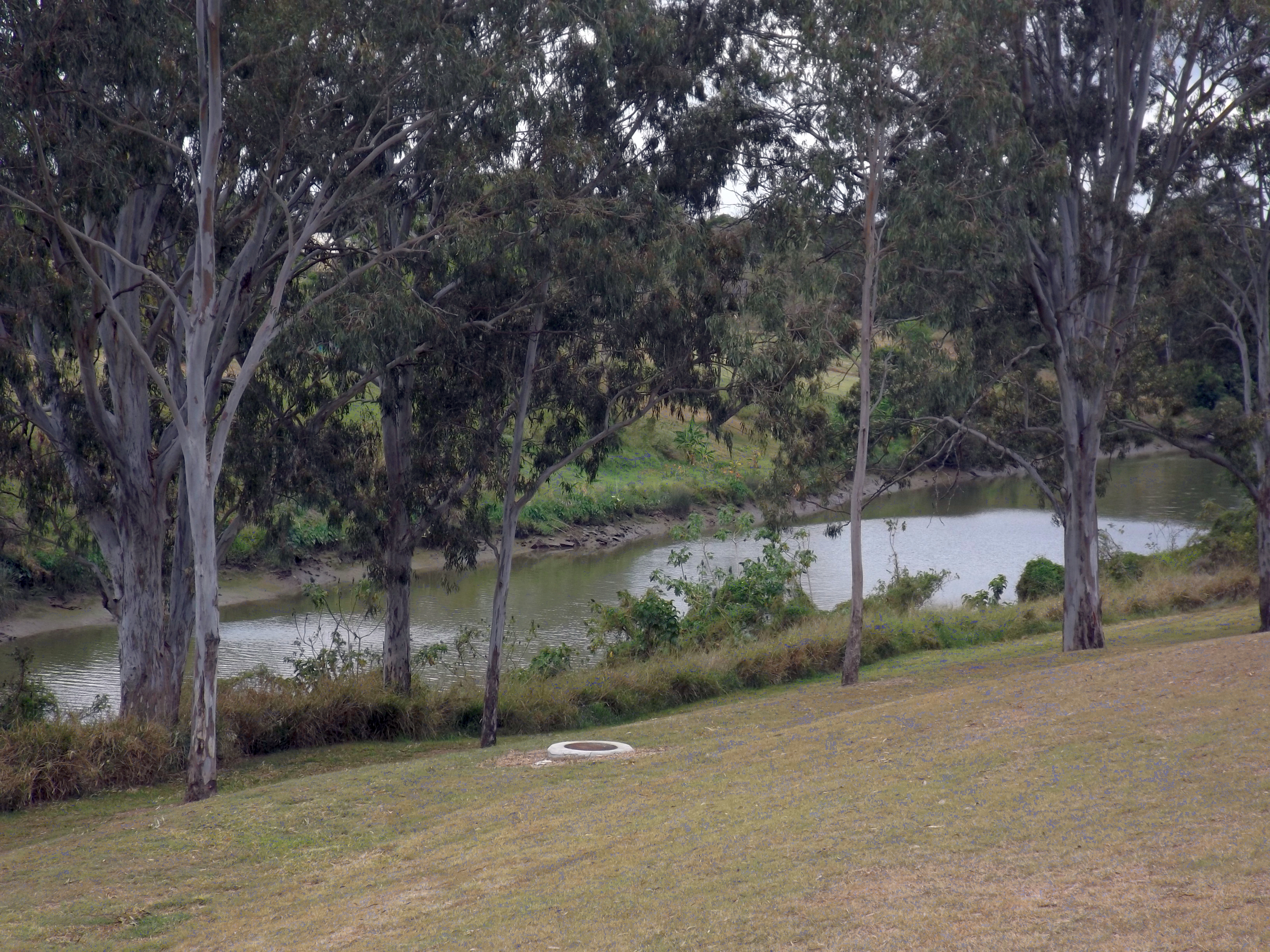
- Bremer River and park, 2015

- Coordinates: 27.6013°S 152.7702°E
- Population: 931 (2021 census)
  - Density: 1,550/km^{2} (4,000/sq mi)
- Postcode(s): 4305
- Area: 0.6 km^{2} (0.2 sq mi)
- Time zone: AEST (UTC+10:00)
- Location: 3.5 km (2 mi) NNE of Ipswich CBD; 40.4 km (25 mi) SW of Brisbane CBD
- LGA(s): City of Ipswich
- State electorate(s): Ipswich
- Federal division(s): Blair
Suburbs around Basin Pocket:
North Ipswich	Tivoli	Moores Pocket
North Ipswich	Basin Pocket	East Ipswich
North Ipswich	North Ipswich	East Ipswich

Basin Pocket is a suburb of Ipswich in the City of Ipswich, Queensland, Australia. In the 2021 census, Basin Pocket had a population of 931 people.

== Geography ==
The suburb is bordered to the north and west by the Bremer River, and to the east and south by East Ipswich.

The land use is almost entirely residential apart from parkland along the riverbank. There are no shops in the suburb but there a small set of shops providing basic services on the corner of Chermside Road and Jacaranda Street in East Ipswich just beyond the south-eastern boundary of Basin Pocket.

== History ==
The origin of the suburb name is derived from "The Basin", an enlarged natural widening used by river steamers to turn before or after berthing at Ipswich, to which the suburb is adjacent. The explorer Allan Cunningham noted the Basin in 1828, and the Rev. Dr John Dunmore Lang suggested that Basin Pocket or Booval might have been a better site for the main settlement.

A ferry service between Basin Pocket and North Ipswich was established by William Isaac Lawrence sometime after his family settled there in the 1860s. (This service does not exist today).

On 15 March 1887, there was a ceremony to turn the first sod for a Primitive Methodist church. Basin Pocket Primitive Methodist Church opened on Sunday 8 December 1867. Services had been held in a rented house for about year prior to the opening of the church. On Tuesday 19 December 1867 (the public holiday for Separation Day), a tea meeting was held for 200 people to celebrate the opening of the church.

St John's Anglican Church was opened on 3 September 1921 by Canon T. L. H. Jenkyn, the rector of St Paul's Anglican Church in Ipswich. It was dedicated on 11 September 1921 by Archbishop Gerald Sharp. Its closure circa 2018 was approved by Bishop Cameron Venables. The church was at 82 Blackall Street (27.6035°S 152.7712°E).

St Philomene's Catholic Church was dedicated on 2 June 1940 by Archbishop James Duhig.

== Demographics ==
In the 2011 census, Basin Pocket had a population of 861 people.

In the 2016 census, Basin Pocket had a population of 890 people.

In the 2021 census, Basin Pocket had a population of 931 people.

== Education ==
There are no schools in Basin Pocket. The nearest primary school is Ipswich East State School in neighbouring East Ipswich to the south-east. The nearest government secondary schools are Bremer State High School in Ipswich to the south-west and Bundamba State Secondary College in Bundamba to the south-east.

== Amenities ==
Other amenities include:

- J Perrett Memorial Park
- McLeod Street Park and Planned Boat Ramp
- Horace J Harper Band Hall (Home of the Ipswich Model Band Est.1906 - the oldest surviving Brass, Concert Band in Ipswich)
- West End Football Club
