= Kyeewa =

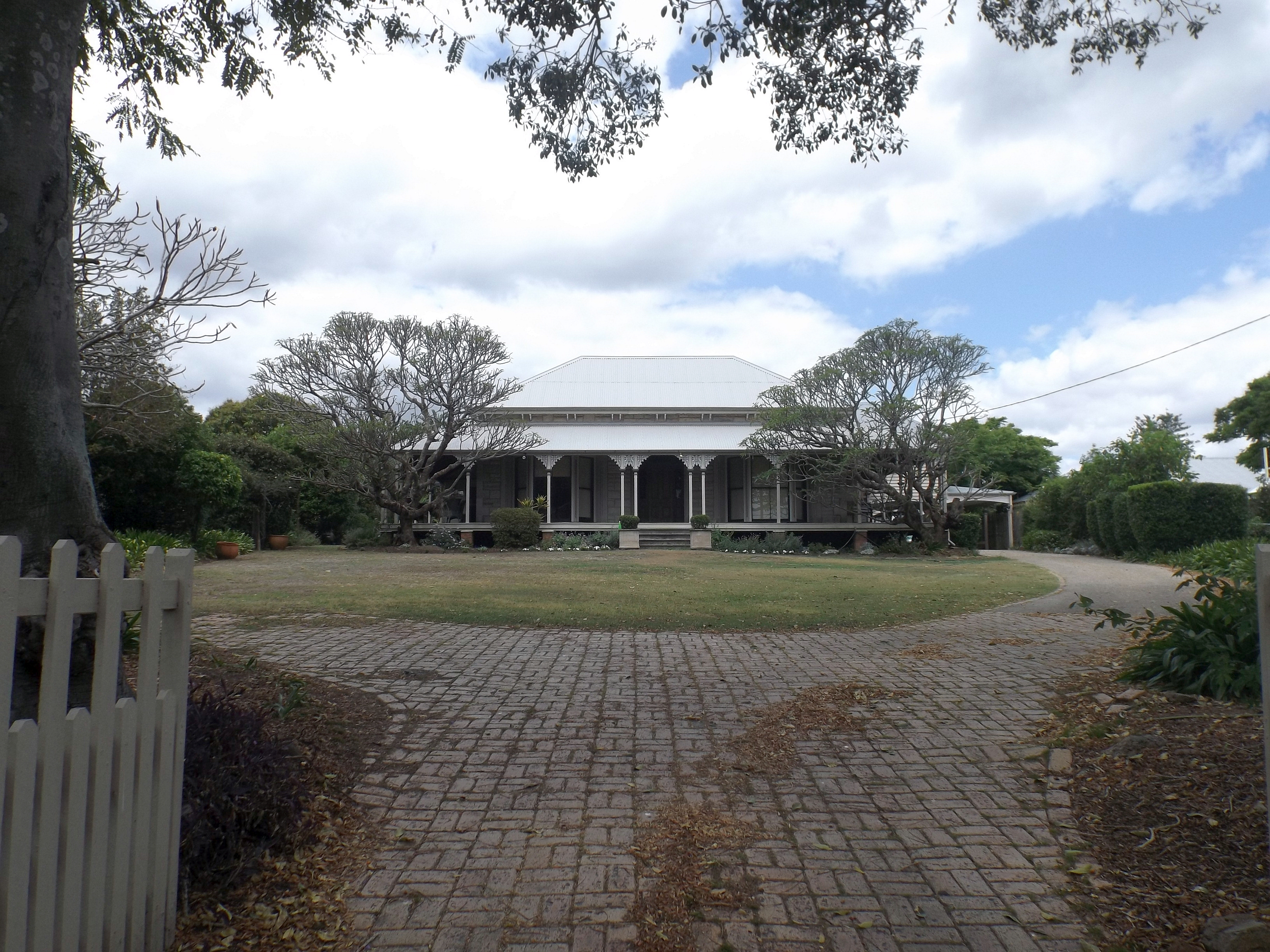
- Residence and front garden, 2015

- Location within Queensland Location within Australia
- 27.6113°S 152.7724°E
- Location: 1 York Street, East Ipswich, City of Ipswich, Queensland, Australia

History
- Design period: 1870s–1890s (late 19th century)
- Built: c. 1890
- Built for: Ernest Greenway

Queensland Heritage Register
- Official name: Kyeewa
- Type: state heritage (landscape, built)
- Designated: 21 October 1992
- Reference no.: 600602
- Significant period: 1880s–1890s (fabric); 1880s– (historical)
- Significant components: residential accommodation – main house, garden/grounds, trees/plantings

Kyeewa is a heritage-listed villa at 1 York Street, East Ipswich, City of Ipswich, Queensland, Australia. It was built c. 1890 for Ernest Greenway. It was added to the Queensland Heritage Register on 21 October 1992.

== History ==
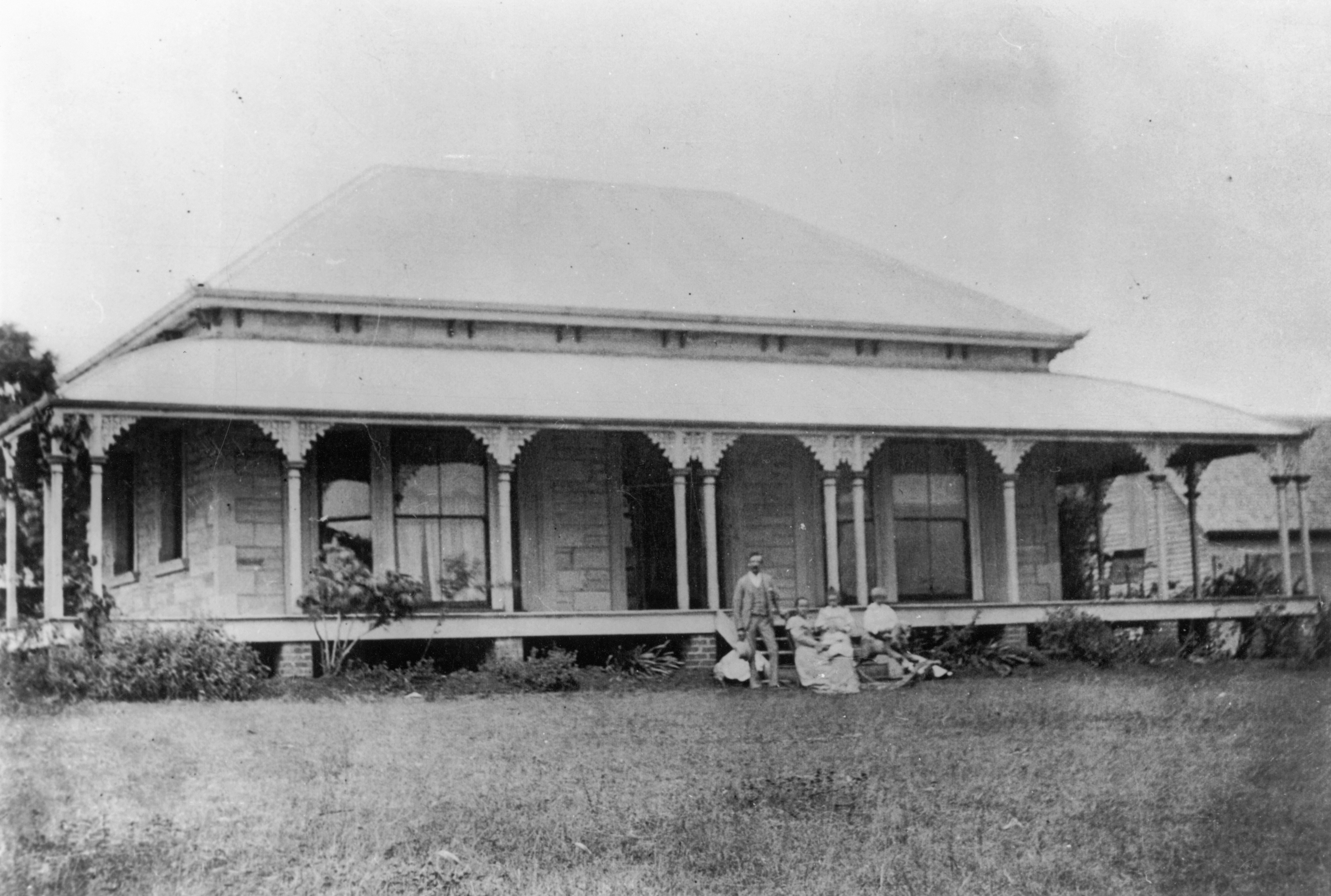
Kyeewa, Greenway home at York Street, East Ipswich

The house was built by workers from the Limestone Street monumental masonry works, run by Ernest Greenway. The stone is believed to have come from the Helidon area. Greenway was a great-nephew of the famous convict architect, Francis Howard Greenway. Greenway's family, from the West Country of England, were reputed for generations as quarrymen, architects, builders and stonemasons. Ernest Greenway married Elizabeth Femister, daughter of a well-known paperhanger and upholster, Alexander Femister, and they lived of "Kyeewa". "Kyeewa" is dated c. 1890. Records of an 1889 Greenway childbirth give Grey Street as the family address, but the next childbirth in 1891 is recorded with a Limestone Hill, so it seems the family had by this time moved to "Kyeewa".

At least until 1986, Ernest Greenway's son, Gordon, lived at "Kyeewa". He was born in 1894. In keeping with the family tradition, he began a career as an architect, working with noted Ipswich architect, George Brockwell Gill. Greenway continued architectural work with the Brisbane City Council and later with Brisbane firm, Conrad and Gargett. "Kyeewa" originally occupied a larger area of land, including an orchard and stables. The latter were on the site now occupied by a house, second from the corner of York Street and Chermside Road. Family records suggest that the house was not completed in accordance with the original plan, and this is further indicated by the rear of the house being constructed from timber, rather than sandstone. Originally the house contained only two bedrooms, a hallway and a drawing room in the masonry section and a kitchen in the timber framed section.

Recent additions to the house include a two-story extension on the rear south-east corner of the house in October 1990 and another two storey extension on the rear south-west corner in 1999.

== Description ==
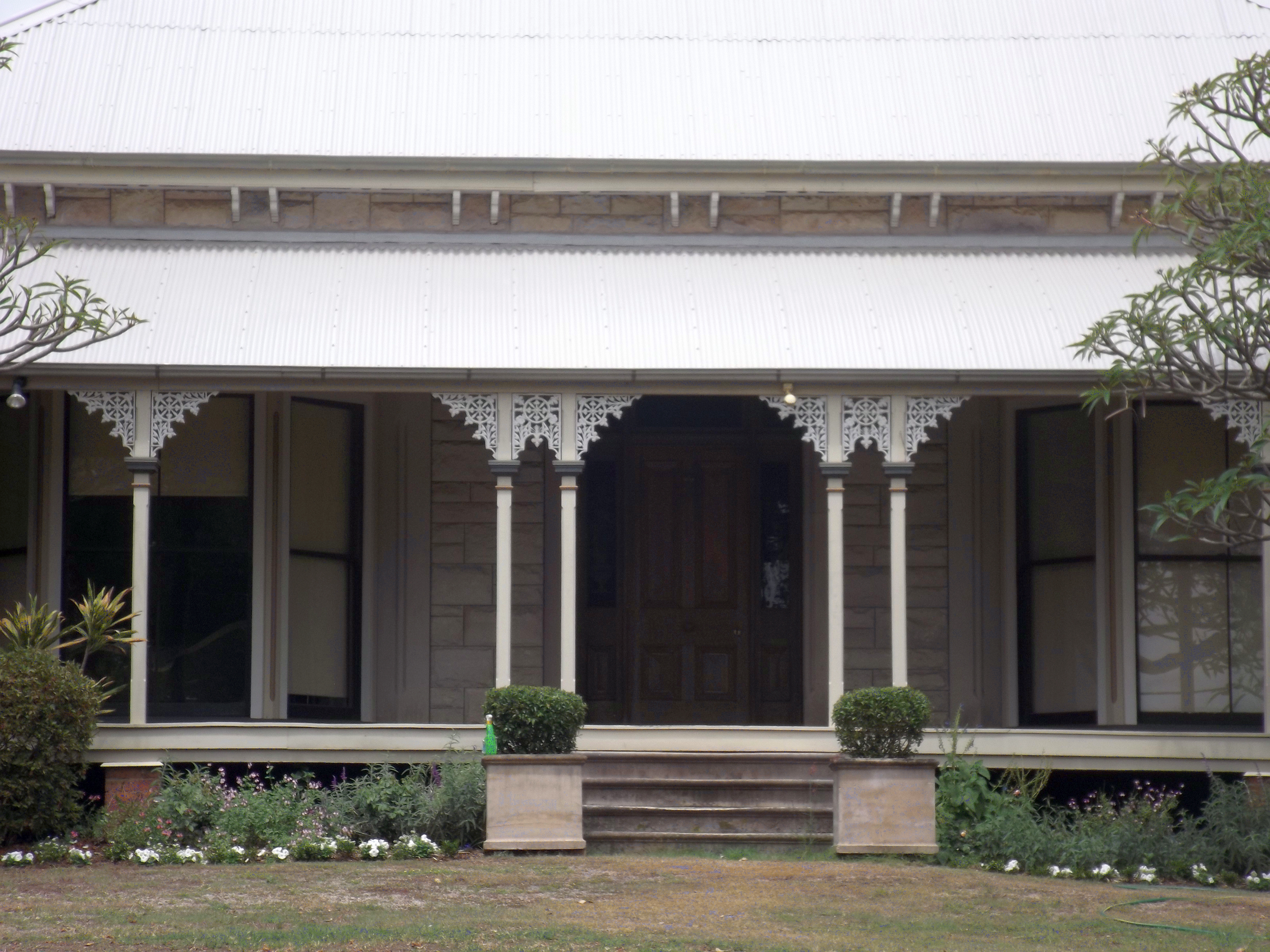
Entrance, 2015

"Kyeewa" is a grand single-storey sandstone residence, with a long ridged hipped corrugated iron roof. It occupies the highest site in the street and is set up well back from the street alignment. It is located opposite another grand residence, "Merton", and there are an unusually high proportion of houses in York Street of architectural and streetscape value. A stepped down, convex roof shades verandahs to three sides of "Kyeewa", with the front verandah facing north. Above the verandah roof are paired brackets to the eaves of the main roof. The house is set less than a metre above the ground and is supported by brick piers. The verandahs are gracefully simple, with no balustrades. The timber support posts have moulded capitals and triangular shaped, cast-iron brackets. The front steps, now of sandstone, are believed to have originally been timber. The walls facing the verandahs are of rusticated sandstone, with smooth quoins and window dressings.

Full length, three sided bay windows project onto the verandah either side of the main entry. The rear of the house, not visible from the street, is constructed from timber. The garden features a number of established trees, including a large Moreton Bag fig, a mango tree, jacaranda and frangipani trees, and this contributes significantly to the property's value.

== Heritage listing ==
Kyeewa was listed on the Queensland Heritage Register on 21 October 1992 having satisfied the following criteria.

The place is important in demonstrating the evolution or pattern of Queensland's history.

Kyeewa is important in demonstrating the development of Ipswich as a prominent commercial and industrial centre which fostered the construction of grand residences during the late nineteenth century, still evident as part of the city's suburban growth.

The place is important in demonstrating the principal characteristics of a particular class of cultural places.

Its scale and siting remain as evidence of a grand colonial dwelling, and the intactness of both the structure and its garden setting, make it a good example of its type.

The place is important because of its aesthetic significance.

It has important aesthetic value as it contributes to the streetscape of York Street which consists of an unusually large number of houses with architectural and streetscape value. In particular Kyeewa's setting on a large piece of sloping land well back from the street, its mature gardens and decorative fence together with the frontage of the house contribute highly to its aesthetic significance.

The place has a special association with the life or work of a particular person, group or organisation of importance in Queensland's history.

It has special association with the Greenways as their family home and their history of involvement with architecture and masonry. It also has special association with the work of Ernest Greenway, a well known, monumental stonemason in Ipswich.
