= St Michaels Nursing Home =

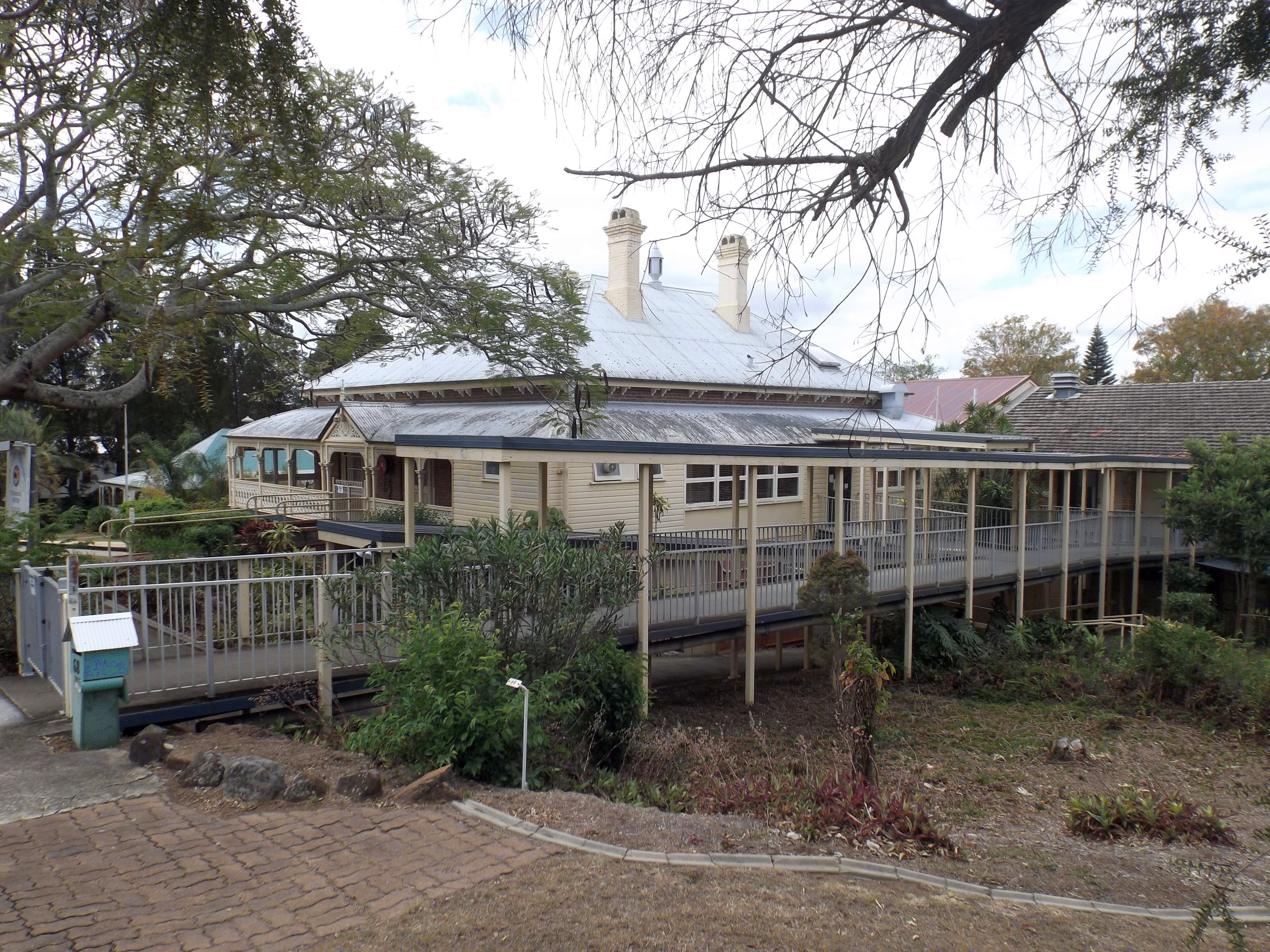
- Building in 2015

- Location within Queensland Location within Australia
- 27.618°S 152.7712°E
- Location: 68 Chermside Road, Newtown, City of Ipswich, Queensland, Australia

History
- Design period: 1870s–1890s (late 19th century)
- Built: c. 1874

Queensland Heritage Register
- Official name: St Michaels Nursing Home, Gwennap
- Type: state heritage
- Designated: 21 October 1992
- Reference no.: 600573
- Significant period: 1870s
- Significant components: residential accommodation – main house

St Michaels Nursing Home is a heritage-listed nursing home at 68 Chermside Road, Newtown, City of Ipswich, Queensland, Australia. It was built c. 1874. It is also known as Gwennap. It was added to the Queensland Heritage Register on 21 October 1992.

== History ==
St Michaels, or "Gwennap", as it was originally known, was built for timber merchant Josias Hancock around 1874. At that time the area around Chermside Road Fiveways was a considerable distance from town, the only other families in the area being the Bullmore's of "Rockton" and the Shillitos.

The name "Gwennap" originates from Hancock's birthplace of Gwennap, Cornwall. At the age of 16 his family emigrated to Australia. They arrived in Sydney on 1 November 1856. Josias' father, Thomas, the elder brother of local builder William Hancock, moved to Queensland in 1864 and eventually established a pit-sawing business at Pine Mountain, later purchasing timber mills at Rosewood and Ipswich.

In 1874 Josias married Emily Trevaskes and built "Gwennap". It is possible that the house was built by his Uncle William Hancock. Late in the 19th century Josias left Ipswich to start his own business in Brisbane. Originally this was called Josias Hancock Timber Merchant, later Hancock and Sons and later again Hancock and Gore. His brother Thomas stayed in Ipswich and later became associated with the historic house Fairy Knoll.

"Gwennap" was purchased by bookseller William Tatham, who moved here from his first home, "The Palms" on Denmark Hill. Tatham had come to Ipswich from Yorkshire and worked at Cribb and Foote until opening his own business on the site of what is now Woolworths. Around 1950, "Gwennap" was purchased by Mr M Daly and was converted to a nursing home. At this time the name was also changed to St Michaels. In July 1970, the nursing home was bought by the Presbyterian Church's Department for Social Mission. While new wings designed by architects Fulton, Gilmour, Trotter and Moss have been added, the structure of the house itself remains essentially unchanged.

== Description ==
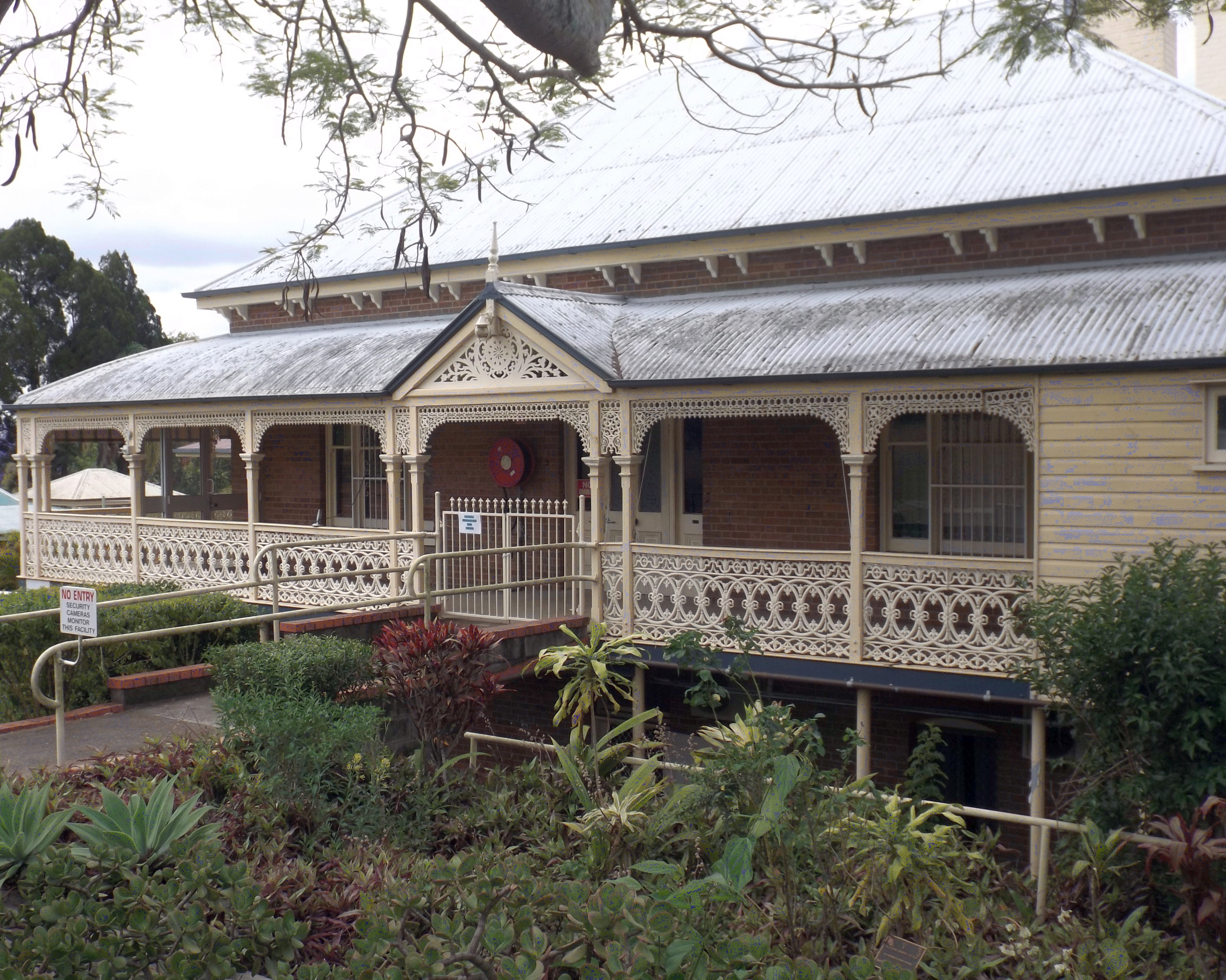
Entrance, 2015

St Michaels Nursing Home is a two-storey brick dwelling with a pyramid corrugated iron roof and a stepped down, straight roof over verandahs to each side. The house is wrapped by verandahs at both levels, although the rear and the southern sides have been enclosed. The land drops away steeply from the footpath, such that from the street, the house appears to be only one storey. A fretwork pediment with paired supports marks the entry at the upper level. This level retains cast-iron balustrades and valance and is accessed from the footpath by a short ramp which bridges the excavated drop down to the ground level. The house has several chimneys, two roof ventilators and paired supports beneath the main roof's eaves.

Units have been added to the site on the northern and southern sides of the original house. They are set well back from the footpath, such that they have little impact on the streetscape qualities of this section of Chermside Road.

The interior of the house is accessed by a large entrance hall which extends to the rear of the original house structure. There is a small foyer area at the front created by a decorative timber partition extending across the hall with an open doorway in the centre. The central feature of the entrance hall is the high dark-timber vaulted ceiling extending from the front door to the rear. The foyer partition does not extend to the ceiling so that the continuity of the ceiling is not obstructed. The hall is unusually large and utilises a lot of the internal space on the upper lever of the house making it likely that it would have been used for entertaining purposes.

On the left-hand wall immediately upon entering the foyer is an original ornate timber mantlepiece with a central mirror. This has been moved from its former position in the adjacent room, most probably a room used for entertaining.

The upper-floor consists of four main rooms off the hall and an open area with a reception counter in the centre section on the right hand side of the hall, as well as two rooms on the enclosed verandah on the southern side of the house. A sitting room to the right of the entrance displays large original timber window frames facing the verandah (which are duplicated on the other side of the entrance) as well as a fireplace on the internal wall. There are two large rooms on the northern side of the house with doors leading from the hall as well as doors to the verandah. There is another room in the rear south-eastern corner. Most of the original timber window and door frames are extant.

The new additions extend perpendicular on either side of the rear of the original house. The modern wings are constructed of brick and concrete.

== Heritage listing ==
St Michaels Nursing Home was listed on the Queensland Heritage Register on 21 October 1992 having satisfied the following criteria.

The place is important in demonstrating the evolution or pattern of Queensland's history.

Constructed in 1874, St Michael's Nursing Home reflects a period of affluent residential development in Ipswich when many of the town's business and industry leaders built substantial, grand residences in keeping with their financial success and the solidification of Ipswich as an important commercial and industrial centre.

The place is important in demonstrating the principal characteristics of a particular class of cultural places.

It is architecturally significant as a substantial, well constructed home, unusual for its era in its being a two-storey dwelling set into a deeply excavated site.

The place is important because of its aesthetic significance.

St Michael's Nursing Home is also aesthetically significant as one of a number of significant dwellings sited on Chermside Road - opposite Queen's Park, and further north in the Ipswich Girls Grammar School area - which collectively form an important streetscape.

The place has a special association with the life or work of a particular person, group or organisation of importance in Queensland's history.

St Michael's Nursing Home is important for its association with the Hancock family of timber merchants, and the Tatham family who had previously owned "The Palms".
