= Walter Burley Griffin Incinerator, Essendon =

Former incinerator, now art gallery, in Melbourne, Victoria, Australia

Walter Burley Griffin Incinerator
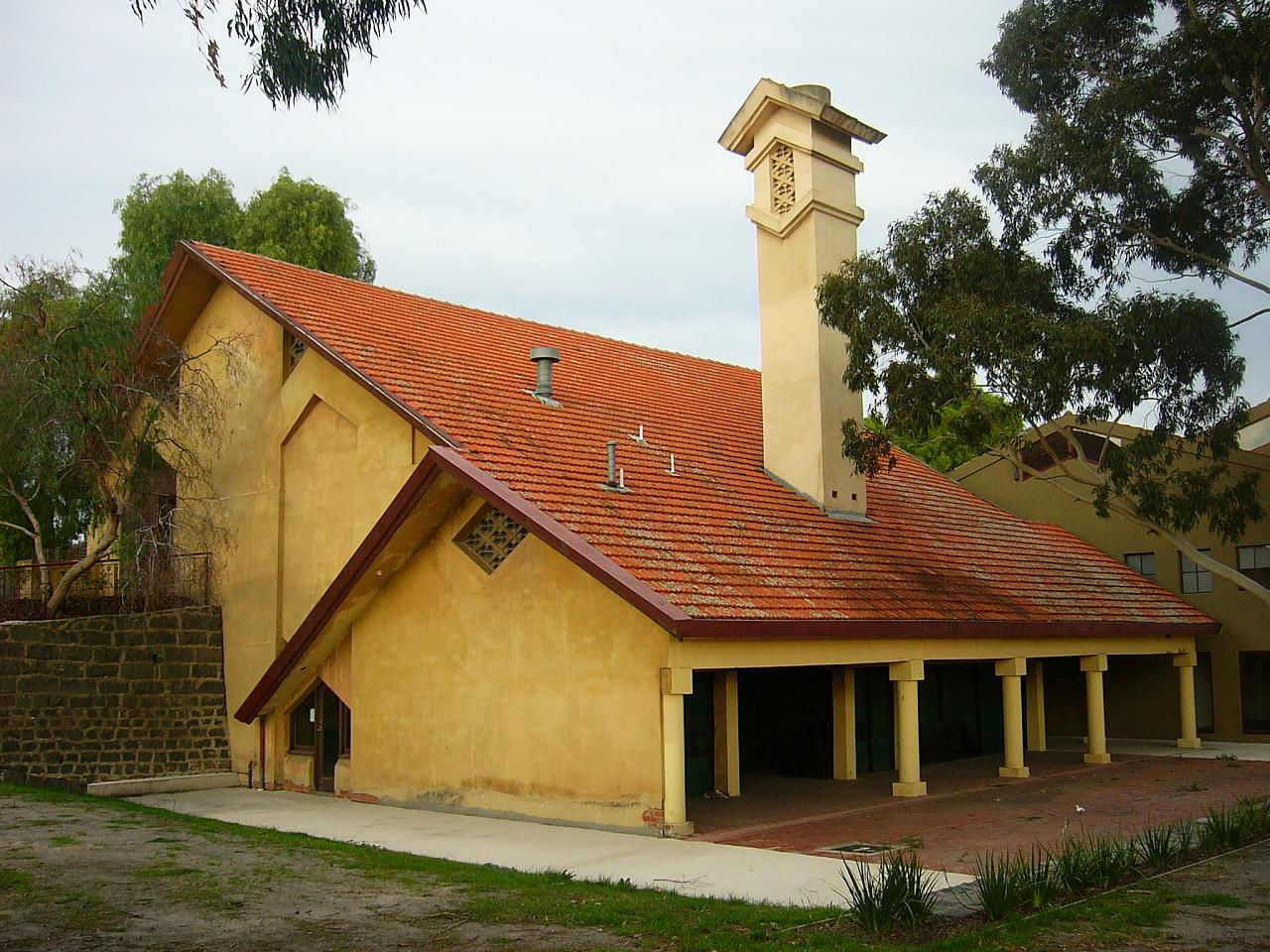

General information
- Status: Completed
- Type: Reverbatory incinerator (1930–1942); Community theatre (1984–c. 1987); Multi-arts facility (2004–2011); Art gallery (2011– )
- Architectural style: Modernist
- Location: Aberfeldie (Essendon), Melbourne, Victoria, Australia
- Coordinates: 37°45′52″S 144°54′11″E
- Current tenants: Incinerator Art Gallery
- Year built: 1929–1930
- Renovated: 2004 (as a multi-arts facility)
- Closed: 1942 (as an incinerator)
- Client: City of Essendon
- Owner: City of Moonee Valley

Technical details
- Material: Reinforced concrete; brick; terracotta
- Floor count: 2

Design and construction
- Architects: Walter Burley Griffin; Marion Mahony Griffin; Eric Milton Nicholls
- Main contractor: Reverberatory Incinerator and Engineering Company (RIECo)

Website
- incineratorgallery.com.au

Victorian Heritage Register
- Official name: Essendon Incinerator Complex
- Type: Registered place
- Designated: 31 January 1979
- Reference no.: H0434
- Heritage overlay no.: HO57
- Category: Utilities - Waste

Register of the National Estate
- Official name: Essendon Reverberatory Incinerator (former)
- Type: Defunct register
- Designated: 30 June 1992
- Reference no.: 5472

The Walter Burley Griffin Incinerator is a former reverbatory (RIECo) incinerator located in Aberfeldie, (Essendon), an inner western suburb of Melbourne, in Victoria, Australia. Built between 1929 and 1930, designed by Walter Burley Griffin, his wife, Marion and business associate, Eric Milton Nicholls, the incinerator operated until 1942 and was repurposed as an art gallery in 2011.

The former incinerator was added to the Victorian Heritage Register on 31 January 1979 in recognition of its architectural, historical and technological (scientific) significance. It is one of six remaining extant incinerators in Australia designed by the Griffins and is the only surviving RIECo incinerator in Victoria. The structure was also added to the now defunct Register of the National Estate on 30 June 1992.

== Description ==
The Essendon incinerator complex at Holmes Road, was built in 1929-1930 and operated until 1942. The two surviving buildings comprise a large reverbatory incinerator building with three incinerator units and distinctive 8-metre-high (26 ft) chimney, and an adjacent two-storey plant-store and workshop building. The incinerator is constructed of reinforced concrete and brick, rendered externally. This building is dominated by its asymmetrical, terracotta tiled roof. Three furnaces survive internally, largely intact.

In the 1920s, incinerators were seen as a solution to shortages of suitable waste lands within municipalities for the tipping of household refuse. The decision by the Essendon Council to build one caused much controversy, mainly due to the perceived unsightliness. Once built, the incinerator was widely praised for its attractive Modernist appearance. The incinerator building was designed by the Melbourne office of Walter Burley Griffin and Marion Mahony Griffin, under the direct supervision of architect Eric Milton Nicholls. The inspiration for the design of the Essendon Incinerator building came from the Peters’ Residence in Chicago, designed by Griffin in 1906; translating its geometric, diamond windows and steep tent ceiling into a new, industrial context, with an ecclesiastical appearance.

The Essendon Incinerator was built by the Melbourne-based Reverberatory Incinerator and Engineering Company (RIECo) and was one of the first incinerators designed by Griffin's office for RIECo. REICo incinerators established a new standard in the effective disposal and management of municipal waste through incineration, as well as providing vastly improved working conditions for the related council staff. The plant-store and workshop building was designed and constructed under the supervision of the city surveyor for the City of Essendon.

The complex was designed to integrate with the character of the surrounding domestic suburb and to provide minimal disruption to its immediate environment in terms of discharge. It survives substantially as designed, although there have been minor modifications to the interior and some original features have been removed. The iron gate to Holmes Road is believed to be original.

The Essendon incinerator complex is historically and technologically significant as the earliest surviving of the thirteen incinerators in Australia designed by Griffin's office and Nicholls, and is the only surviving Griffin incinerator in Victoria. It is believed to be the most intact of six surviving incinerators by Griffin's office. It is one of just three reverbatory incinerators surviving in Victoria.

The building is owned by the City of Moonee Valley and was repurposed for various uses since the mid-1980s, most recently as the Incinerator Art Gallery since 2011.

== See also ==
- List of places on the Victorian Heritage Register in the City of Moonee Valley
- Walter Burley Griffin Incinerator, Hindmarsh
- Walter Burley Griffin Incinerator, Ipswich
- Walter Burley Griffin Incinerator, Willoughby
