= Ipswich Model Band =

The Ipswich Model Band is a marching band formed in Ipswich, Queensland, Australia, in 1906. It is still active as a community band.

== History ==
Ipswich Model Band were formed early in January 1906 in the south-east Queensland city of that name. The inaugural secretary, George Bizzell, and treasurer, R. Grainger organised the purchase of their early instruments with funds raised by members subscriptions. One of the group's first performances was at the East Ipswich ground of the local rugby union team in June of that year. By October the conductor was Samuel O. Booth and the band held socials to raise further funds. In 1915 the conductor was J. W. Bergemeister.

In May 1924 the conductor, Horace J. Harper, celebrated the band's victories in a recent state competition, held at Toowoomba and run by the Queensland Band Association. In April of the following year, at a similar competition, a reporter for The Brisbane Courier observed, "Ipswich Model Band opened well, but lost ground slightly ¡n the serenade. In the succeeding section a strongly marked rallentando was achieved, which made for a pleasing contrast when the livelier tempo was resumed." Harper was conductor from 1920 to 1964.

Performances by the band, in October 1939, were broadcast on national radio stations, 4QN (Townsville), 7NT (Launceston), and 2FC (Sydney). They performed the national anthem for the Australian Governor-General, Prince Henry, Duke of Gloucester, in August 1945 during his visit to Ipswich. Later they "played a specially selected programme. Items were: Marches, 'Invicta' and 'Contemptibles'; song marches, 'Waltzing Matilda', 'There'll Always Be an England', 'We Did It Before so We'll Do It Again' and 'Advance Australia Fair'; song, 'Cherie'."

In October 1954 the band moved into their new headquarters, a hall, in East Ipswich. They established a public appeal to fund the purchase. In 1967 it was named, Harper Hall, in honour of their long-term former conductor. As from February 2017 the band still performs, rehearses and meets in the hall. Their repertoire consists of, "Australiana, film and television scores and themes from animated productions."
