= Newtown, Queensland (Ipswich) =

Newtown
- Suburb
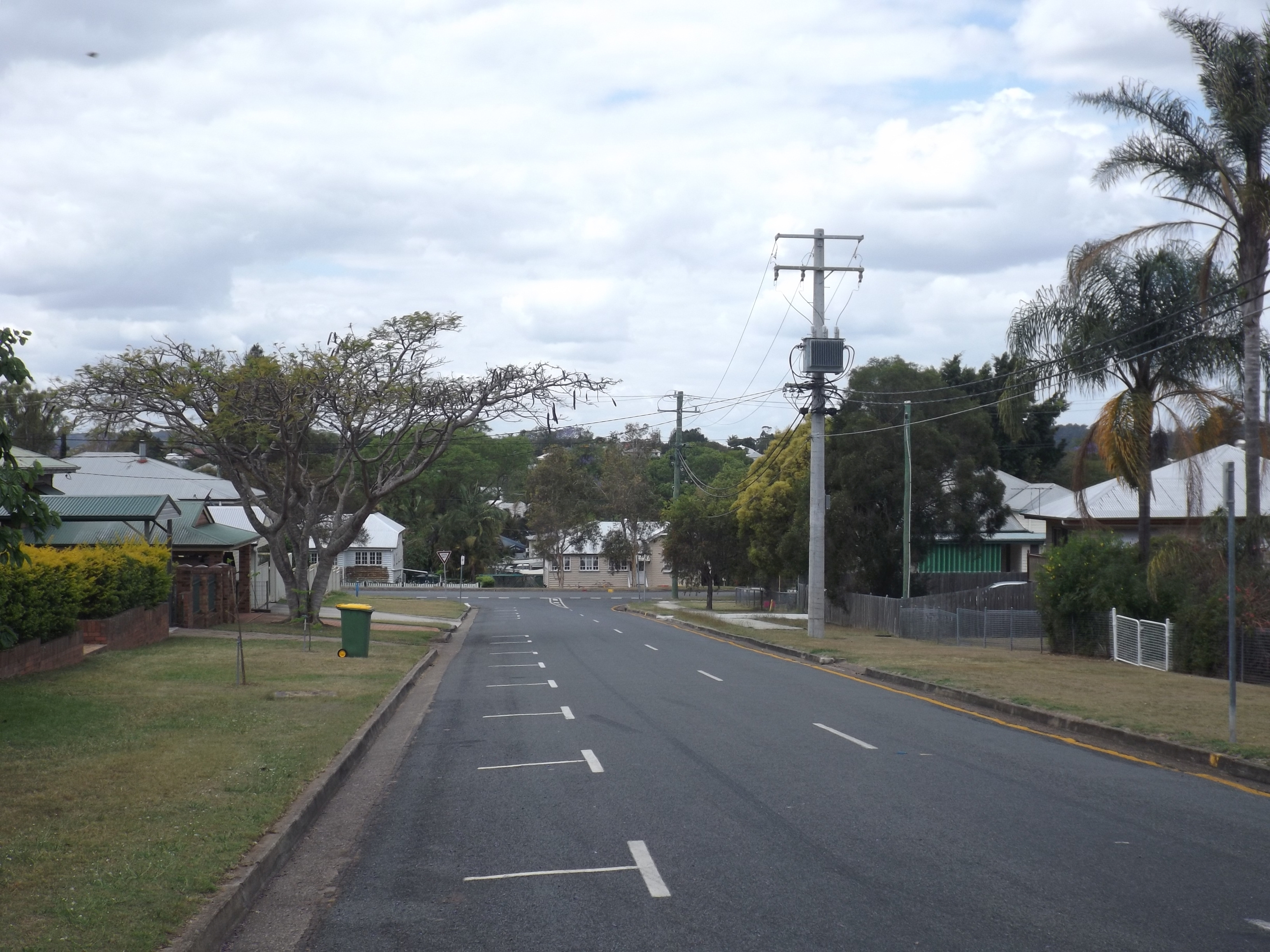
- Rockton Street, 2015

- Coordinates: 27.6163°S 152.7769°E
- Country: Australia
- State: Queensland
- City: Ipswich
- LGA: City of Ipswich
- Location: 2.5 km (1.6 mi) NE of Ipswich; 41 km (25 mi) SW of Brisbane

Government
  - State electorate: Ipswich
  - Federal division: Blair

Area
  - Total: 0.7 km^{2} (0.27 sq mi)

Population
  - Total: 1,498 (2021 census)
  - Density: 2,140/km^{2} (5,500/sq mi)
- Time zone: UTC+10:00 (AEST)
- Postcode: 4305
Suburbs around Newtown
East Ipswich	East Ipswich	Booval
Ipswich	Newtown	Booval
Ipswich	Eastern Heights	Silkstone

Newtown is a suburb in the City of Ipswich, Queensland, Australia. In the 2021 census, Newtown had a population of 1,498 people.

== Geography ==
Newtown is bordered by Queens Park to the west, to the north by Brisbane Road, the city's main arterial link to the Ipswich Motorway.

A small set of shops lies on the five-ways intersection where Brisbane Road, Queen Victoria Parade, Glebe Road and Chermside Road meet.

== History ==
The suburb takes its name from a housing estate sold by John Rankin about 1865.

Newtown State School opened on 1 July 1882. In 1915 the school was moved to a new location and renamed Silkstone State School.

== Demographics ==
In the 2016 census, Newtown had a population of 1,615 people.

In the 2021 census, Newtown had a population of 1,498 people.

== Heritage listings ==
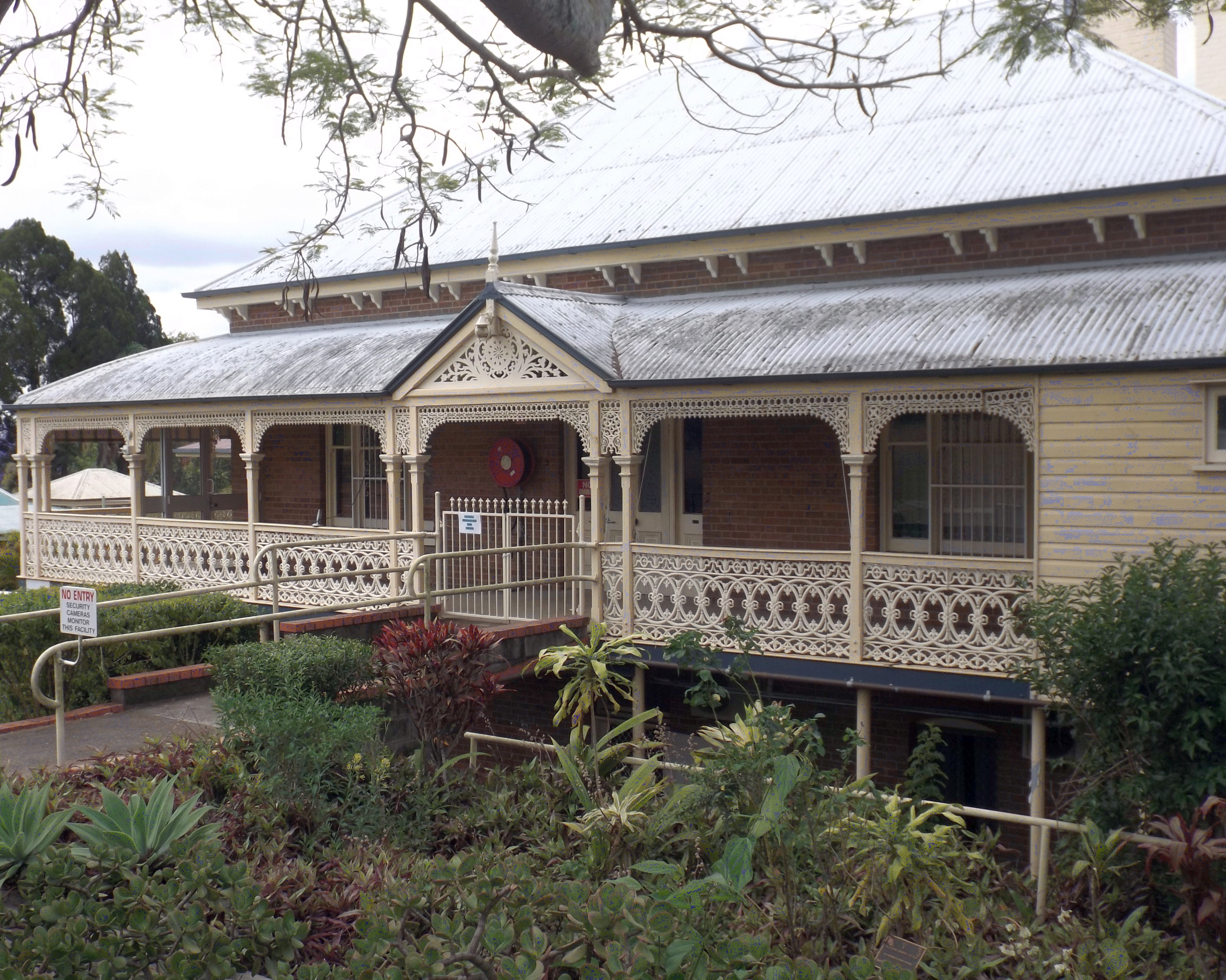
St Michaels Nursing Home, 2015

Newtown contains a number of heritage-listed sites including:

- 68 Chermside Street (27.618°S 152.7712°E) : St Michaels Nursing Home
- 4 Rockton Street (27.6162°S 152.7721°E): Rockton

== Transport ==
Newtown is serviced by East Ipswich railway station, which provides access to regular Queensland Rail City network services to Brisbane, Ipswich and Rosewood via Ipswich.

== Amenities ==
- Spring Garden Park
- Newtown Park

== Education ==
There are no schools in Newtown. The nearest primary schools are Ipswich Central State School in Ipswich, Silkstone State School in Silkstone and Ipswich East State School in East Ipswich. The nearest secondary schools are Bremer State High School in Ipswich and Bundamba State Secondary College in Bundamba.
