= Moores Pocket, Queensland =

Suburb in Queensland, Australia

Moores Pocket
- Suburb
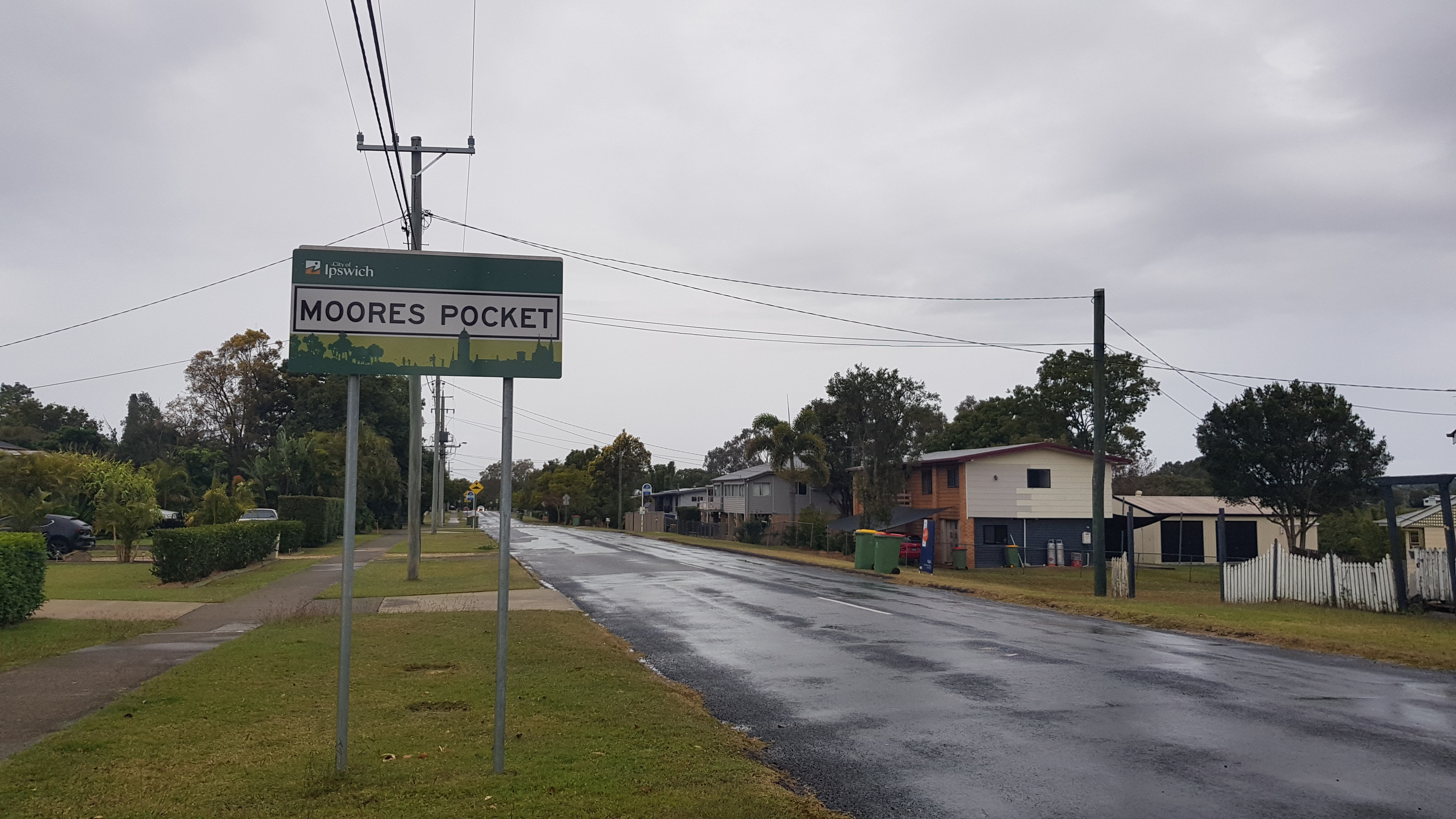
- Moores Pocket Road, 2023

- Coordinates: 27.5988°S 152.7825°E
- Country: Australia
- State: Queensland
- City: Ipswich
- LGA: City of Ipswich
- Location: 4.7 km (2.9 mi) NE of Ipswich CBD; 41.3 km (25.7 mi) SW of Brisbane CBD

Government
  - State electorate: Ipswich West
  - Federal division: Blair

Area
  - Total: 0.9 km^{2} (0.35 sq mi)

Population
  - Total: 772 (2021 census)
  - Density: 860/km^{2} (2,220/sq mi)
- Time zone: UTC+10:00 (AEST)
- Postcode: 4305
Suburbs around Moores Pocket
Tivoli	North Booval	North Booval
Basin Pocket	Moores Pocket	North Booval
East Ipswich	North Booval	North Booval

Moores Pocket is a suburb in the City of Ipswich, Queensland, Australia. In the 2021 census, Moores Pocket had a population of 772 people.

== Geography ==
As the name suggests, Moores Pocket is bounded by the winding Bremer River on all sides except the north-west where it is separated from the suburb of Tivoli by Boundary Road.

== History ==
The origin of the suburb name is from Thomas Moore, an early blacksmith in the area.

The suburb was greatly damaged in the 1893 Brisbane River flood.

The suburb was flooded in the 2011 Queensland floods.

== Demographics ==
In the 2016 census, the locality of Moores Pocket had a population of 736 people.

In the 2021 census, the locality of Moores Pocket had a population of 772 people.
