= Walter Burley Griffin Incinerator, Willoughby =

Walter Burley Griffin Incinerator
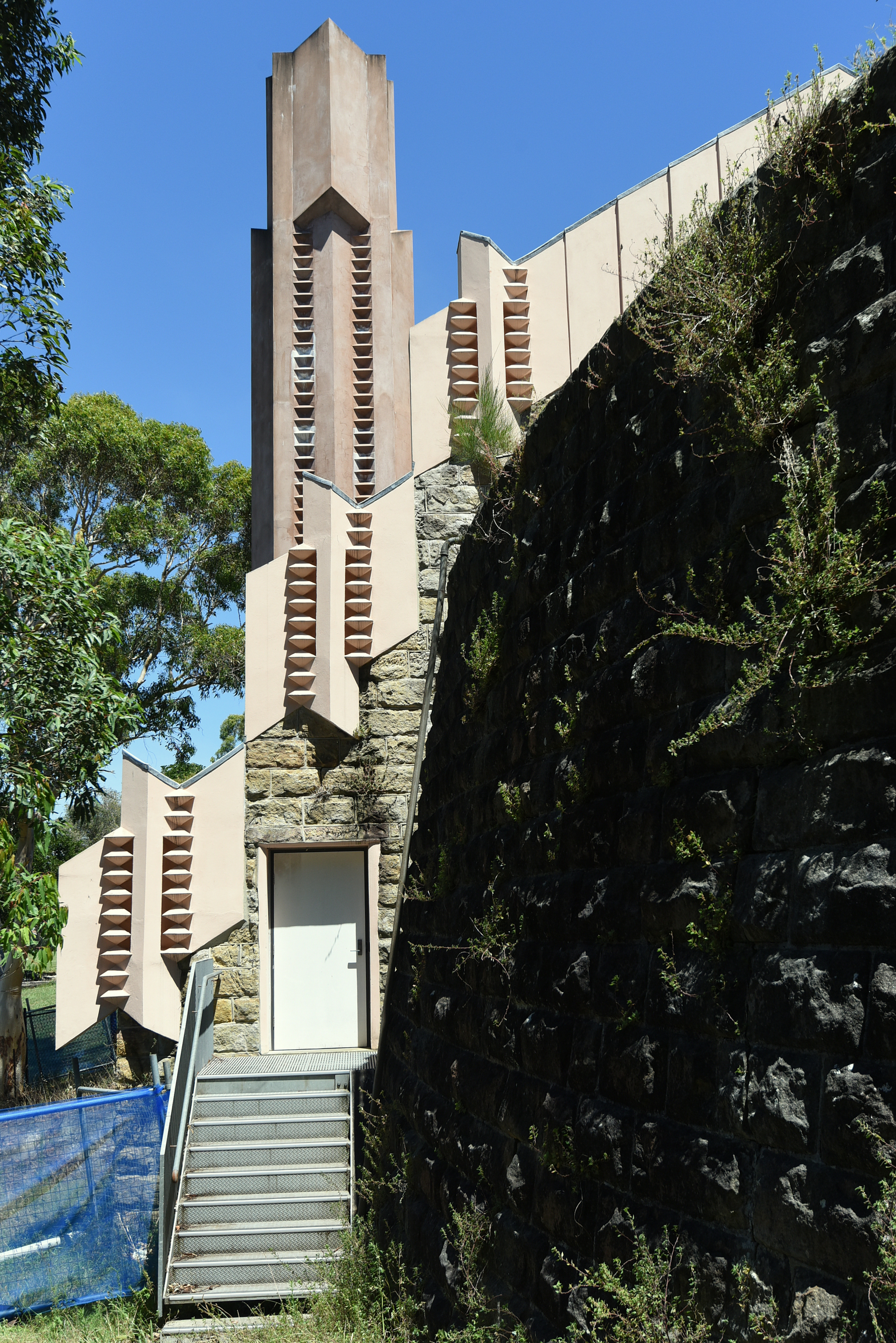
- Walter Burley Griffin incinerator, Willoughby, pictured in January 2018

- Location within Sydney Location within Australia
- 33°48′43″S 151°12′06″E
- Location: 2 Small Street, Willoughby, City of Willoughby, Sydney, New South Wales, Australia

History
- Built: 1933–1934; 92 years ago

Site notes
- Architects: Walter Burley Griffin; Eric Nicholls
- Owner: Willoughby City Council

New South Wales Heritage Register
- Official name: Walter Burley Griffin Incinerator; Willoughby Municipal Incinerator
- Type: State heritage (built)
- Designated: 2 April 1999
- Reference no.: 84
- Type: Incinerator
- Category: Utilities – Waste
- Builders: Reverberatory Incinerator and Engineering Company (REICo); Nisson Leonard-Kanevsky

The Walter Burley Griffin Incinerator is a heritage-listed former incinerator and now art gallery, artists studios and public recreation area at 2 Small Street, Willoughby, City of Willoughby, Sydney, New South Wales, Australia. It was designed in partnership between Walter Burley Griffin and Eric Nicholls and built from 1933 to 1934 by Reverberatory Incinerator and Engineering Company and Nisson Leonard-Kanevsky. It is also known as Willoughby Municipal Incinerator. The property is owned by the Willoughby City Council. It was added to the New South Wales State Heritage Register on 2 April 1999.

== History ==
=== Walter Burley Griffin (1876–1937) ===
Walter Burley Griffin was born near Chicago and trained at Nathan Ricker's School of Architecture at the University of Illinois, graduating in 1899. From 1901 to 1906, he worked as an associate of Frank Lloyd Wright at Oak Park. Griffin started his own practice in 1906 and within a few years established his reputation as an architect of the Prairie School. In 1911, Griffin married Marion Mahony, who had graduated in architecture from the Massachusetts Institute of Technology and worked as Wright's head designer.

Inspired by the designs by Frederick Law Olmsted (often called the founder of American landscape architecture) of New York's Central Park and his "green necklace" of parks in Boston, landscape design was the career Walter Burley Griffin would have pursued had the opportunity offered. He had approached Chicago landscape gardener Ossian Cole Simonds for career advice before entering the University of Illinois in 1895. Apparently unsatisfied with the lack of relevant curriculum, Simonds urged him to pursue architecture and study landscape gardening on his own, as he himself had done. Griffin took what classes he could and, like Simonds and landscape gardener Jens Jensen, shared an approach to landscape design through architecture, an interest in civic design, urbanism and planning.

In 1902 there were only six "landscape gardeners" (and no landscape architects) listed in the Lakeside Annual Directory of the City of Chicago. In 1912 only two landscape architects and 13 landscape gardeners were listed.

Griffin's practice as a landscape architect was first featured in a public text in Wilhelm Miller's "The Prairie Spirit in Landscape Gardening" (1915), which included Griffin as an exponent (along with Jensen, Simonds and architect Frank Lloyd Wright) of his proposed American regional "Prairie" style. Simonds, Griffin and Miller had all attended the first national meeting of the American Society of Landscape Architects (ASLA) in 1913 in Chicago. By 1914 Griffin and his architect wife Marion Mahony had moved to Australia after winning the 1912 international design competition for the Federal Capital, Canberra with a scheme based on its topography, a distinctly non-prairie valley landscape of undulating hills. This was a project they had worked on together. By 1919, there were problems with the Canberra project and Griffin resigned his position as Federal Capital Director of Design and Construction. He then formed the Greater Sydney Development Association to purchase 263 hectares (650 acres) in Middle Harbour, which became known as Castlecrag. He devoted the next fifteen years to developing and promoting the area, while maintaining an architectural practice.

Griffin believed dwellings should play a subordinate role in the scheme of nature. His houses were small and intimate. He aimed toward the most natural use of land and the selection of indigenous plants. He also developed an economical construction system of pre-cast interlocking structural tiles, which he called "Knitlock", and used it widely, as well as stone, in the houses of Castlecrag. In the early 1930s, Griffin built incinerators for the destruction of household garbage in various cities and suburbs in the eastern states of Australia. They provided a canvas for experimentation with form and texture for the architect, but sadly few have survived. Two Griffin incinerators survive in suburban Sydney: the Glebe Municipal Incinerator (City of Sydney Local Environmental Plan 2000 local heritage item); and the Willoughby Incinerator (State Heritage Register (SHR) listing #84).

Griffin's work took him to India in 1935 and he died there two years later of peritonitis. Griffin's contribution to the development of the Wrightian / Prairie School style internationally has begun to receive attention from architectural historians in recent years. It is now increasingly acknowledged that Griffin contributed a number of fresh concepts to the Prairie School, most noticeably: his attention to vertical space (a development leading directly to the ubiquitous split-level style post-war houses); "open plan" living and dining areas dominated by a large central fireplace; and the extensive domestic use of reinforced concrete.

Griffin is also internationally renowned for his work as a landscape architect, especially the innovative town planning design of Canberra and Castlecrag, Griffith and Leeton. Griffin's design approaches to landscape and architecture informed one another. Landscape itself, for example, crucially served as a basis for architecture - a conviction first made explicit in the Canberra publicity, Griffin noting (in Chicago) that: "...a building should ideally be "the logical outgrowth of the environment in which [it is] located"." In Australia, he hoped to "evolve an indigenous type, one similarly derived from and adapted to local climate, climate and topography." In Australia the scale and number of his landscape commissions grew considerably, including a number of town plans. Griffin signed many of his drawings with the term "landscape architect".

=== Willoughby incinerator ===
A number of forces resulted in local governments taking responsibility for garbage collection and disposal, following Sydney's 1901 bubonic plague epidemic, through to the construction of efficient municipal incinerators in the late 1920s and early 1930s. The Willoughby Incinerator was one of these responses.

The Walter Burley Griffin Incinerator in Willoughby was built between 1933 and 1934. It commenced operations on 7 May 1934. It was officially opened by the Mayor of Willoughby on 6 September 1934 and became known as the Municipality of Willoughby Reverberatory Refuse Incinerator. It was one of a number using the Australian patented Reverberatory Refuse Incinerator Company invention. These included incinerators at Pyrmont, Randwick, Glebe, Leichhardt, Pymble and Waratah in New South Wales, Essendon and in Brunswick, Victoria, the heritage-listed Walter Burley Griffin Incinerator in Ipswich, Queensland, and incinerators in Hindmarsh, South Australia and in Canberra, built after Griffin's death in 1938. The Willoughby Incinerator was Griffin's most successful adaptation of the vertical feed process incinerator to a steeply sloping landscaped site.

Nisson Leonard-Kanevsky, the founder of the REICo (Reverberatory Incinerator and Engineering Company), was an aggressive businessman who spared no effort to convince local councils that the incinerators should be an essential part of local government equipment, and which would be, in Griffin's elegant structures, a civic embellishment. The Reverberatory Incinerator was an Australian patent which achieved a much higher efficiency than its imported competitors by preheating and partly drying the refuse while it moved down a sloping, vibrating grate in the combustion chamber which itself was designed to reflect (reverberate) heat on to the incoming refuse. The function of the building dictates the location on a slope or embankment as it is an in-line, vertical "top gravity feed" process. The gravitation of the raw refuse from storage hoppers down to the combustion chamber, the ash pit, and the ash delivery hoppers required truck access on at least two levels, presenting problems of siting and the design of site works, at which Griffin was most adept.

The designs for the incinerators vary widely and there is no doubt that Nicholls contributed to the conception of most, but it is clear that Griffin exerted himself in the Willoughby building, located not far from his residential subdivision at Castlecrag.

The 1930s depression impacted significantly on Willoughby Council resulting in inadequate funds to install a second furnace or maintain the incinerator. There was a reversion to open-air dumping by the late 1940s and this continued on an increasing scale over the next 20 years. By the 1960s the Incinerator had fallen into disuse and was closed.

The changes in community values regarding unrestrained development and its impact on the environment that emerged in the late 1960s, influenced local politics from 1974. For Willoughby Council, as elsewhere, there was increasing pressure to manage waste and public open space in accordance with new legislative requirements. The incinerator building was saved from demolition following an active campaign by community groups. The building was converted to a restaurant in 1982, by Colin Dilworth with the assistance of the NSW Heritage Council. The restaurant operated successfully for several years but became a victim of economic pressure in 1988. At this time the lease was sold to Design Six Properties Pty Ltd.

The Australian Bicentennary provided the opportunity to reclaim the adjacent tip through an ambitious project to create a major sporting complex and a lineal park linking Artarmon with Middle Harbour. Community efforts continued to get Council to restore the landscape and conserve the incinerator building as a community facility. In 1989, the new leaseholders were associated with a firm of architects and converted the premises to office space removing much of the interior restaurant equipment. In late 1991 the architects subleased sections of the building to a small communications company, Wavelength. By the mid-1990s Wavelength Communications occupied the whole building and was used as their corporate headquarters. In 1995 the site was listed as a local heritage item on Willoughby Local Environmental Plan.

The incinerator was damaged by fire in August 1996. In September 1997 the Incinerator was restored to office space potential. In 1999 the site was listed on the NSW State Heritage Register. In 2001 a "History, Significance and Management" report was prepared by Meredith Walker and Trevor Waters. In 2006 a Conservation Management Plan and Asset Management Strategy was prepared by GML Heritage. In 2008 approvals were given for conservation works to restore the incinerator building and adaptively reuse it as a community hall, artist studio and cafe. On 21 May 2011 the building reopened to the public after extensive works. It has an art gallery opening on the lower level, artist studio space on the middle level and a cafe to come. Council also put the chimney back - a show of faith in the property's future.

In 2014 the cafe opened at street level.

== Description ==
The incinerator, constructed of local sandstone with a top hamper of painted stucco, carries panels of Griffin's geometric modelling and the building cascades down the hillside in a series of steps with acrobatic verve.

A composite reinforced concrete steel and brick structure, it consists of four levels of roofed tiled pitched and skillion forms punctuated by a faceted flue tower. The stepped forms are clad with sandstone at the sides and architectural concrete panels decorated with pyramidal designs revealing the influence of Ancient Mayan designs on Griffin's work.

The free standing building sits high on the northern edge of the park, set on the road that runs along the edge and defined by a series of high sandstone retaining walls. The operation of the Incinerator required truck access at both upper and lower levels and Griffin made excellent use of the sloping ground to integrate the building and landscape with its functional requirements.

The incinerator is set over three levels and cascades down the sloping hillside in response to the functional requirements of its operation. The building comprises a concrete frame structure clad externally with a combination of rough cut sandstone blocks and decorative rendered concrete, utilising Griffin's favourite triangular motif. Windows are generally timber framed except for the aluminium suites of the larger areas of glazing added in the early 1980s conversion. The roof is framed with steel trusses and covered with green concrete tiles. It is not known whether these tiles were original or were installed in the 1980s work.

In the fire of August 1996 the interior and roof of original green concrete roof tiles were badly damaged but the sandstone and concrete walls remain intact. The fire was confined to the upper level, which was completely devastated. The two lower floors suffered extensive water damage but little direct fire damage. The fire was concentrated on the western end of the upper floor and in that area the steel framed roof trusses have buckled, leading to a loss of roofing tiles as the roof plane partially collapsed in this area. Other trusses have retained their integrity.

The whole composition is surmounted by a prominent chimney which is also decorated in the triangular cement motif. Internally, the building in its present state was essentially a modern office fitout within the confines of the former incinerator.

=== Condition ===
As at 11 August 2016, the physical condition was excellent. Archaeological potential was poor. As at June 2006: $454,545 funding approved for: conservation of the chimney, and rectification of drainage and rising damp. Funding through the Australian Government's new National Heritage Investment Initiative. Willoughby City Council planned to restore the heritage building and return the building to community use. The total cost of the restoration was calculated at $1,303,000 with Willoughby City Council funding the remaining $848,455.

=== Modifications and dates ===
- 1933 - Incinerator built.
- 1934 - Officially opened and plaques added to building.
- 1960s - Incinerator closed down.
- 1982 - Converted to a restaurant.
- 1989 - Converted to office space.
- 1996 - Damaged by fire.
- 1997 - Restored to office space potential.
- 21 May 2011: The building reopened to the public after adaptive reuse and conservation works. It has an art gallery on the lower level, artist studio space on the middle level and a cafe to come. Council also put the chimney back

=== Further information ===
The SHR curtilage should be revised to correspond with that recommended in section 6.4.4 of Walker & Waters, 2001, encompassing the incinerator building and hoppers, rock outcrops, and brick shed (formerly part of the sewage dump operation) and all the land between the playground, bike path and road access to the Leisure Centre carpark. This land should be managed to conserve and interpret the heritage values of the incinerator buildings and should remain free of any further above-ground structures.

Related places include:

- the other site for the incinerator and sewage dump, namely Scott's Creek near Eastern Valley Road;
- other (6) extant incinerator buildings designed by Griffin and Nicholls partnerships in association with the REICo, namely: Glebe, NSW; Ipswich, Qld.; Essendon, Vic.; Hindmarsh & Thebarton, SA.; and Canberra, ACT.;
- other buildings designed for Leonard-Kanevsky, namely Leonard House, an office building in Melbourne CBD.;
- other nearby works of Griffin, particularly the Castlecrag development and the Griffin-designed houses within it, where both Griffin and Leonard-Kanevsky lived at the time of construction of the incinerator.

Related objects comprise the plans and other records of the building, its site and history. The major collection is held by Willoughby City Council.

== Heritage listing ==
As at 12 January 2005, the Willoughby Incinerator is significant as one of two remaining municipal incinerator buildings in NSW, designed by the internationally renowned architect (and landscape architect) Walter Burley Griffin and his partner Eric Nicholls, to house the Australian-patented system of vertical top gravity feed (followed by drying prior to burning) developed by the Reverberatory Incinerator and Engineering Company (REICo).

It is significant in its local context as:

- a major work of the architectural partnership of Griffin and Nicholls, both of whom lived in nearby Castlecrag and were active in the development of the suburb of Castlecrag and nearby areas, and also as a work associated with Nisson Leonard-Kanevsky, managing director of the REICo, who lived at Castlecrag from 1931-the early 1940s (in the Griffin-designed Fishwick house);
- a local landmark in the suburb and local government area of Willoughby;
- a site of contention and protest associated with its use and operation for waste management; and
- a major cause celebre in heritage conservation in the Willoughby local government area.

The Willoughby Incinerator is of cultural significance for its relationship with the adjoining parkland and their combined evidence of environmental management of waste disposal, and as a municipal incinerator building that survives from the 1930s.

The Incinerator is an intact and particularly successful example of an industrial building integrating function with site and one of the most significant buildings erected in Australia in the 1930s. It is also one of the only three buildings of this type by Walter Burley Griffin remaining in New South Wales.

Walter Burley Griffin Incinerator was listed on the New South Wales State Heritage Register on 2 April 1999 having satisfied the following criteria.

The place is important in demonstrating the course, or pattern, of cultural or natural history in New South Wales.

The Walter Burley Griffin Incinerator is of historical significance because it is associated with a move by Local Governments along the eastern seaboard of Australia to adopt a new technology, in the 1930s, for the disposal of waste in an efficient manner.

The place is important in demonstrating aesthetic characteristics and/or a high degree of creative or technical achievement in New South Wales.

The Walter Burley Griffin Incinerator is of aesthetic significance as it is perhaps the best surviving example of the work of the architect Walter Burley Griffin and his partner Eric Nicholls, who designed a range of similar Municipal Incinerators on behalf of the Reverberatory Incinerator and Engineering Company (RIECo) during the 1930s. It is recognised as one of the finest of Griffin's incinerators, where he explored to the maximum his decorative designs in rendered concrete and rough cut stone faced retaining walls. It retains its external architectural integrity. It is a marvellous architectural composition, clearly expressing the multi level functions of its operations as the building cascades down the side of a hill. The Incinerator is now well sited above a parkland, formed from the original municipal rubbish tip.

The place has a strong or special association with a particular community or cultural group in New South Wales for social, cultural or spiritual reasons.

The Walter Burley Griffin Incinerator is socially significant as it is held in high esteem by those who are interested in the works of Walter Burley Griffin. It provides, to those who frequent the parkland below, a major visual backdrop to the passive recreation facility. It is well liked by those who have worked in the building, particularly in recent years, following its conversion to office space.

The place has potential to yield information that will contribute to an understanding of the cultural or natural history of New South Wales.

The Walter Burley Griffin Incinerator is of scientific significance as the building was a strong and clear architectural response to the requirements of the original reverberatory incineration process, one which Griffin worked through to a unique and well developed architectural imagery. Some remnants remain of the original industrial equipment and processes within the building, and good documentation of the original equipment to record the original design technology.

The place possesses uncommon, rare or endangered aspects of the cultural or natural history of New South Wales.

The Incinerator is rare in the wider context of urban developnment of Sydney.

The place is important in demonstrating the principal characteristics of a class of cultural or natural places/environments in New South Wales.

The Walter Burley Griffin Incinerator is now the highest quality surviving example of Griffin's Incinerators in New South Wales.

== See also ==
- Walter Burley Griffin Incinerator, Essendon
- Walter Burley Griffin Incinerator, Ipswich
