= Queens Park, Ipswich =

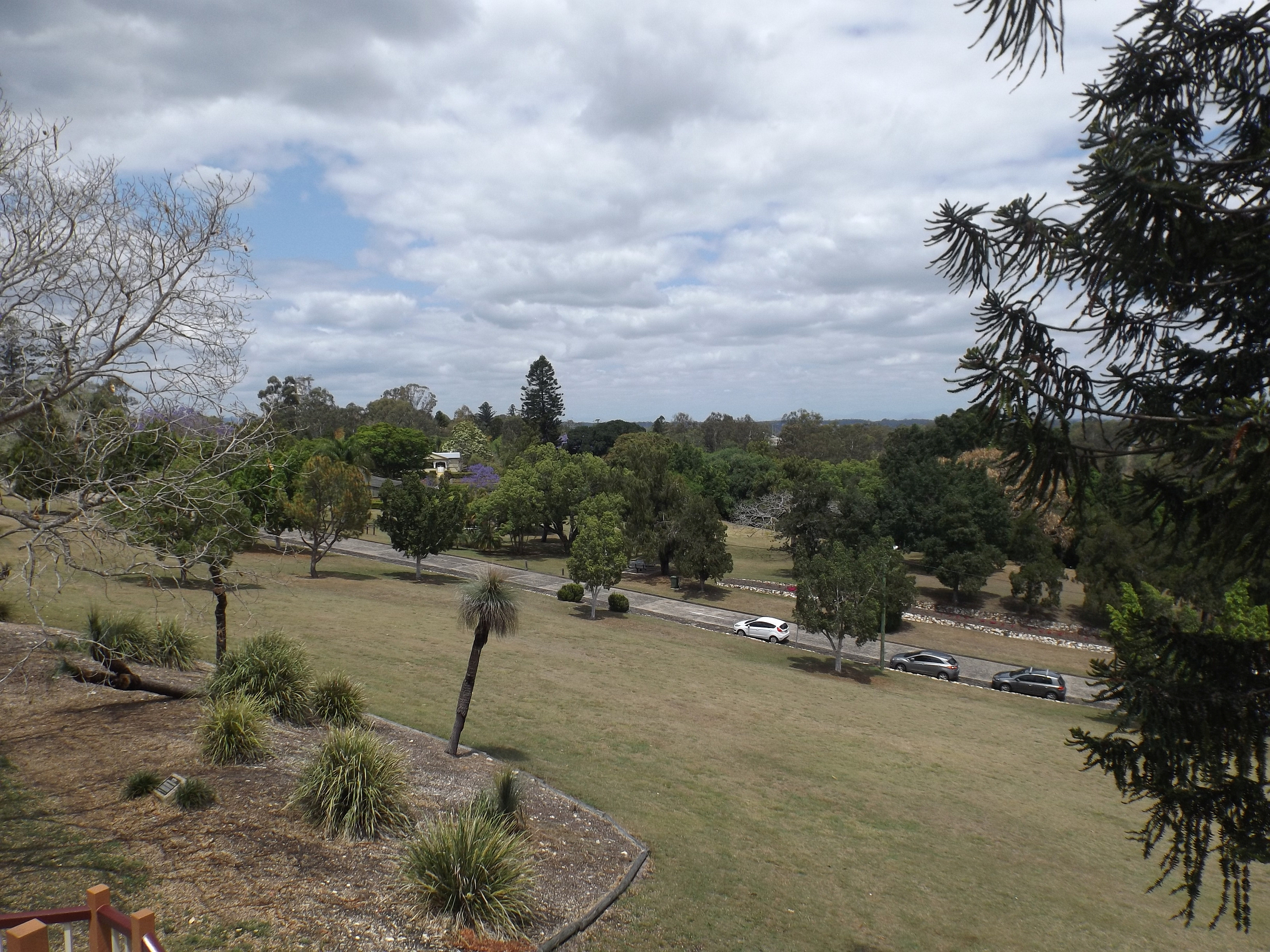
- View south from Limestone Hill Lookout, 2015

- Location within Queensland Location within Australia
- 27.6177°S 152.7682°E
- Location: Milford Street, Ipswich, City of Ipswich, Queensland, Australia

History
- Design period: 1840s–1860s (mid-19th century)
- Built: c. 1864–1960s

Queensland Heritage Register
- Official name: Queens Park
- Type: state heritage (built, landscape)
- Designated: 27 September 2002
- Reference no.: 602356
- Significant period: c. 1864–1960s (fabric); 1858, 1862, 1893 (historical); 1858–ongoing (social)
- Significant components: incinerator, tennis court, memorial – cairn, memorial – obelisk, gate – entrance, bushhouse/fernery, bowling green, clubroom/s / clubhouse, residential accommodation – staff housing, pathway/walkway, terracing, garden – bed/s, memorial – rotunda, trees/plantings, steps/stairway, croquet lawn, wall/s

Queens Park is a heritage-listed botanic garden and park at Milford Street, Ipswich, City of Ipswich, Queensland, Australia. It was built from c. 1864 to 1960s. It was added to the Queensland Heritage Register on 27 September 2002.

== History ==
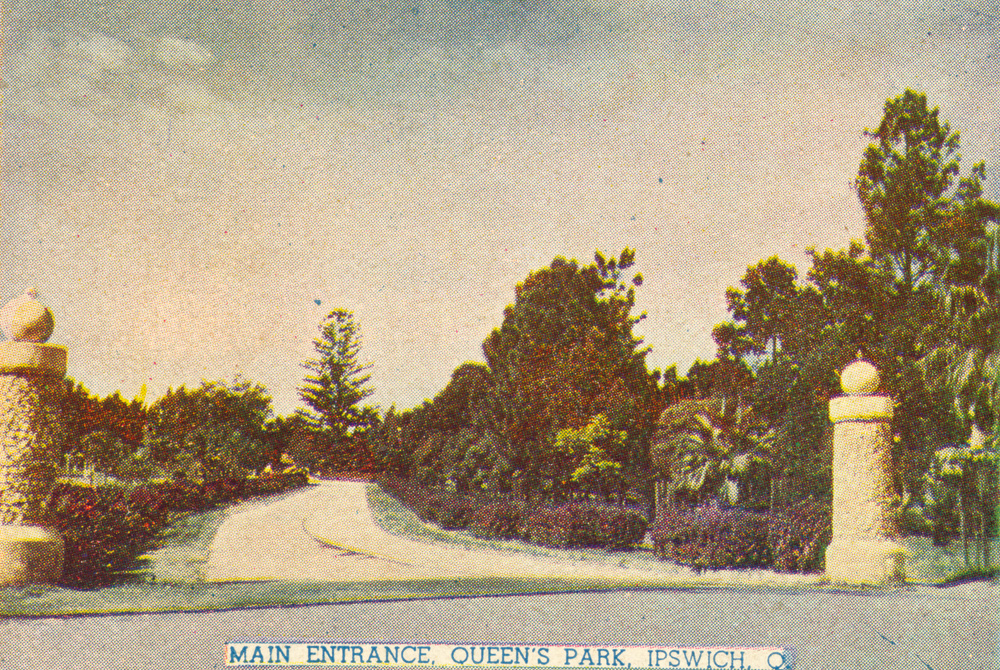
Main entrance, Queens Park, Ipswich, 1940s

Queens Park, Ipswich is the central section of a reserve granted in 1858 as a botanic garden and park for public recreation.

In 1842 Henry Wade set aside a "reserve for public recreation and botanic gardens" at Woodend in the first survey of Ipswich, though this was not developed. In 1855 Walter Hill was appointed Director of Brisbane Botanic Gardens and the "branch" botanic reserves at Ipswich, Toowoomba and Warwick were under his supervision. The people of Ipswich objected to the site reserved by Wade and a public meeting was held in 1856 regarding a change of site to the current area. In 1858, the proposed reserve was approved, provided that land was made available for railway use. It was much larger than the current area now designated Queens Park and was bounded by Torch Street to the north, incorporating a section of riverbank; Milford Street to the west, Salisbury Road to the south and Chermside Road to the east. It included two major limestone features and a spring in the southern section where Aborigines camped until the 1890s.

In 1859, trustees for the park were chosen in accordance with the system also used for other Queens Parks. They were all men very prominent in Ipswich in the 19th century - John Panton, George Thorn Jnr., Patrick O'Sullivan, Frederick Forbes, Christopher Gorry, Henry Challinor, Arthur Macalister, Henry Kilner and George Faircloth. The Board of Trustees were formally appointed in 1862 and a Deed of Grant for 207 acres (84 ha) was recorded on 8 May 1862. In the following year they issued rules for opening hours and the protection of flora in the park by impounding grazing animals and banning the cutting of grass and trees. These regulations seem to suggest that the reserve was regarded as a town Common by the public and may have been the trigger for several petitions made between 1863 and 1872 for council control of the reserve.

Walter Hill, Director of the Brisbane Botanic Gardens, supplied plans for the park layout, together with suitable trees from the Brisbane Gardens, including araucarias and cupressus, in 1864, though he noted on a visit in 1876 that the plans had not been followed. However, at this time the trees supplied by him were said to be growing well and the park was in good order with a drive and entrance gates and enclosed by a post and rail fence. The Brisbane Botanic Gardens and Acclimatisation Society had also supplied fruit trees and flowering shrubs by 1875 and a house had been built for the Superintendent. Facilities built while the park was a government garden included a bush house erected in 1890 and a band rotunda constructed in 1891. Ipswich was noted for its champion bands and performances drew huge audiences for Saturday concerts in the park.

Serving a scientific and commercial purpose as well as a recreational one, the park was also active as a horticultural/agricultural experimental station and propagating garden. It supplied plants for Arbor Day plantings and to the Brisbane Botanic Gardens. Trials of clover are reported as being carried out in 1891. Government support was provided in the form of grants in aid and by 1890 the Ipswich gardens had received £8300, more than any other regional reserve except the Botanical Gardens at Rockhampton, demonstrating the importance of the work carried out by such facilities.

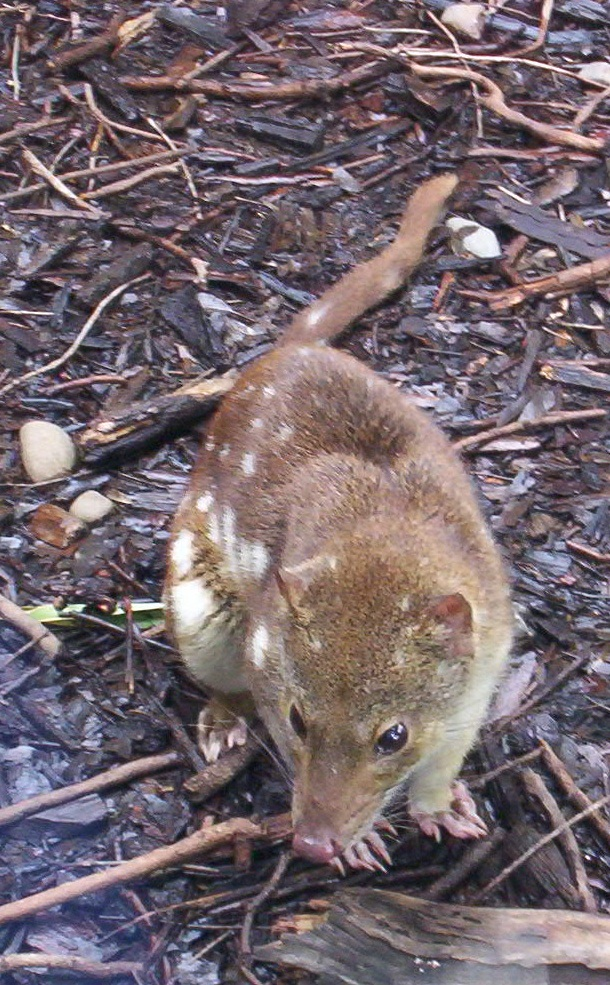
Tiger quoll, 2010

The original reserve shrank in area over time. A section to the north of the park which included a length of river bank, was resumed for the railway which opened to Brisbane in 1874 and two roads were cut through the park. This division of the park into three sections affected the way in which the park developed. The central section of the reserve was gazetted as a Park Reserve on 18 August 1891 and a School Reserve to the north was excised. The Central Boys and Girls School reserves were possibly also excised at this time. In 1893 Queens Park was transferred to Ipswich City Council. The following year, the southern section, now Limestone Park, was transferred to Ipswich City Council.

Land within the park was leased to several sporting associations. The first of these was the Ipswich Croquet Club, which was founded in 1902 and was allotted space for a court in the park. The Ipswich Bowling Club was founded in 1910 and opened a green for play in the park in 1912. A clubhouse was built for them to the design of W Haenke in 1914. This was removed to make way for a new clubhouse in the 1960s.

In 1915, F W Turley, who had trained at Kew Gardens in England, was appointed as curator and began a number of works that are still prominent features of the park. Under his direction more trees were planted in what was a still fairly open landscape. Turley planted bougainvillea in several locations in the park, popularising the plant to an extent where it was voted as the floral emblem of Ipswich in 1930. One variety, which has a brick red flower, is called Turley's Special after him.

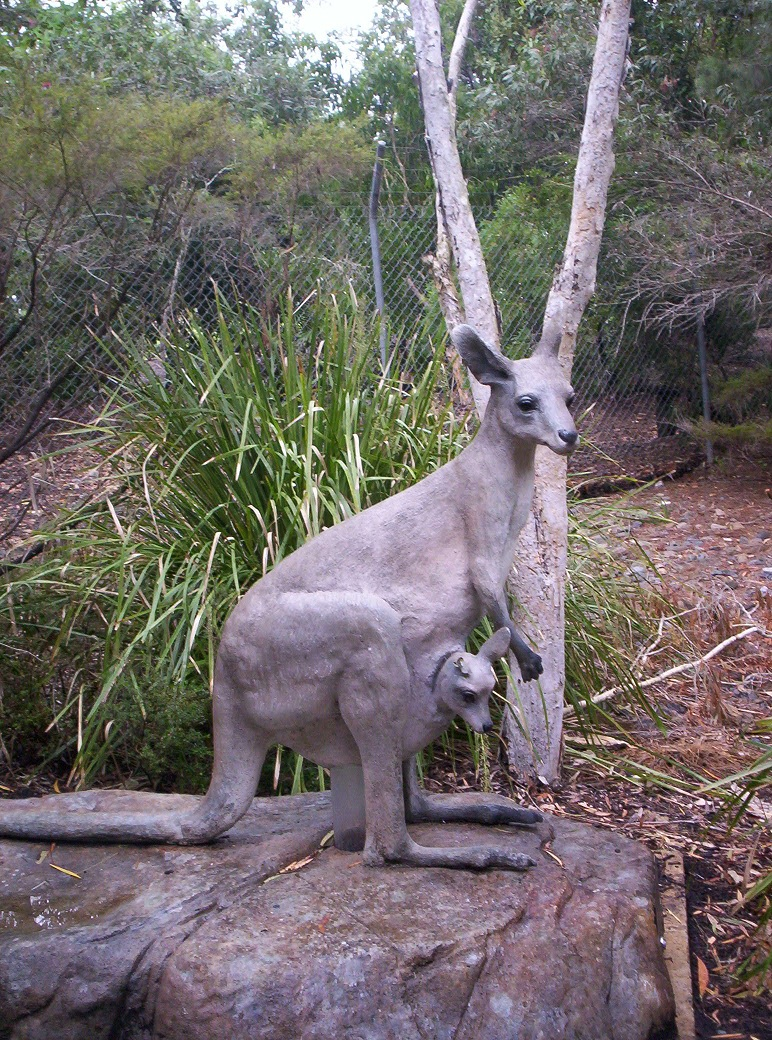
Sculpture, 2010

In the 1930s Depression a number of large-scale works including the construction of walls, gates and terracing were carried out in the park by relief labour. The park curator's house was relocated to the current site and in 1936 enclosures were built to accommodate a menagerie. This included emus, kangaroos and ducks and at one time had koalas, dingos and a fox. The sports clubs also commissioned building works in this period. In 1933 William Haenke designed a clubhouse for the Croquet Club and in 1934 a clubhouse was built for the Ipswich Lawn Tennis Association. Haenke also extended the Bowls Club in 1935. He was born in Ipswich and, after working for a Melbourne firm of architects in the 1890s, returned to practice in his native town in 1900 until his death in 1953.

In 1935, the Walter Burley Griffin Incinerator was constructed in the southern section of Queens Park to process the city's refuse. Built to the design of Walter Burley Griffin, it is now one of only six surviving examples of the twelve incinerators of this type built in Australia. Although it ceased its original function in 1960, it has been adapted as an intimate theatre, opening in 1969 as the home of the Ipswich Little Theatre.

Other sections of parkland were leased for diverse purposes in the Interwar period. In 1928 a service station was established on the northeast corner of the park and a section on the western side was used to construct the King George V memorial scout hall that opened in 1937. Following World War II a kindergarten was constructed close to this site.

In 1960, the introduction of a one-way street system isolated the entrance gates to the northwest and they are now located on a small island between roads. In 1967 the Haenke bowls clubhouse was replaced by a two-storey brick structure, which was extended and modified in 1977.

Queens Park has continued to develop and recent work has included the redesign of the menagerie as a nature garden and the reconstruction of an early bell gazebo that collapsed in the 1980s. In 2001 the Nerima Japanese garden was created in an area formerly occupied by steel framed glasshouses.

== Description ==
Queens Park is currently bounded by Brisbane Street to the north, Milford Street to the west, Chermside Street to the east and the boundaries of Lots 1–2 RP 99201 and Lot 442 SL 4125 to the south excepting an access road from Griffith Road between these lots.

The northern section of the original reserve is occupied largely by Ipswich Girl's Grammar School, though it contains two memorials and a striking pyramidal structure of limestone terracing alongside Brisbane Street. The entrance gates are now on a triangular piece of land to the northwest corner of the park and separated from it by Limestone Street. The section of the original reserve to the south is now known as Limestone Park and contains several major sporting facilities. The section in the centre is officially Queens Park and also contains the Walter Burley Griffin Incinerator, which is separately entered in the Queensland Heritage Register.

Queens Park contains two ridges of silicified magnesian limestone running north-northwest and south-southeast. This type of limestone has been used for stonework features within the park. These are of a consistent and distinctive style and are constructed of rubble with stone capping and include walls, steps, terraces and several gateways with cylindrical posts.

The section to the north of Brisbane Street contains a knoll, the northwestern end of the limestone ridge. This has a striking landscaped feature of limestone paths and terraces reminiscent of a stepped pyramid topped by trees. There are two identical memorials on each side of structure and near the road. These are low obelisks formed of limestone rubble on concrete bases with a panel of contrasting basalt rubble on each face. They have pyramidal limestone caps. That on the southwest commemorates Allan Cunningham, botanist and explorer, and that to the north is dedicated to Thomas Glassey, an early reformist Member of the Queensland Legislative Assembly for Ipswich. Behind his memorial is a feature called "the hummock" a remnant of the limestone ridge encircled by a low stone wall.

The park contains a number of early plantings including alternating hoop and bunya pines beside the gates on Chermside Road. There is also a stand of grass trees (Xanthorrhoea australis) near the present lookout that are believed to have existed when the park was formed. Intentional plantings include fig trees, bunya and hoop pines, bottle trees and bamboo. Many of F.W. Turley's plantings survive, including trees lining Brisbane Road and plantings of the bougainvillea that he helped to popularise.

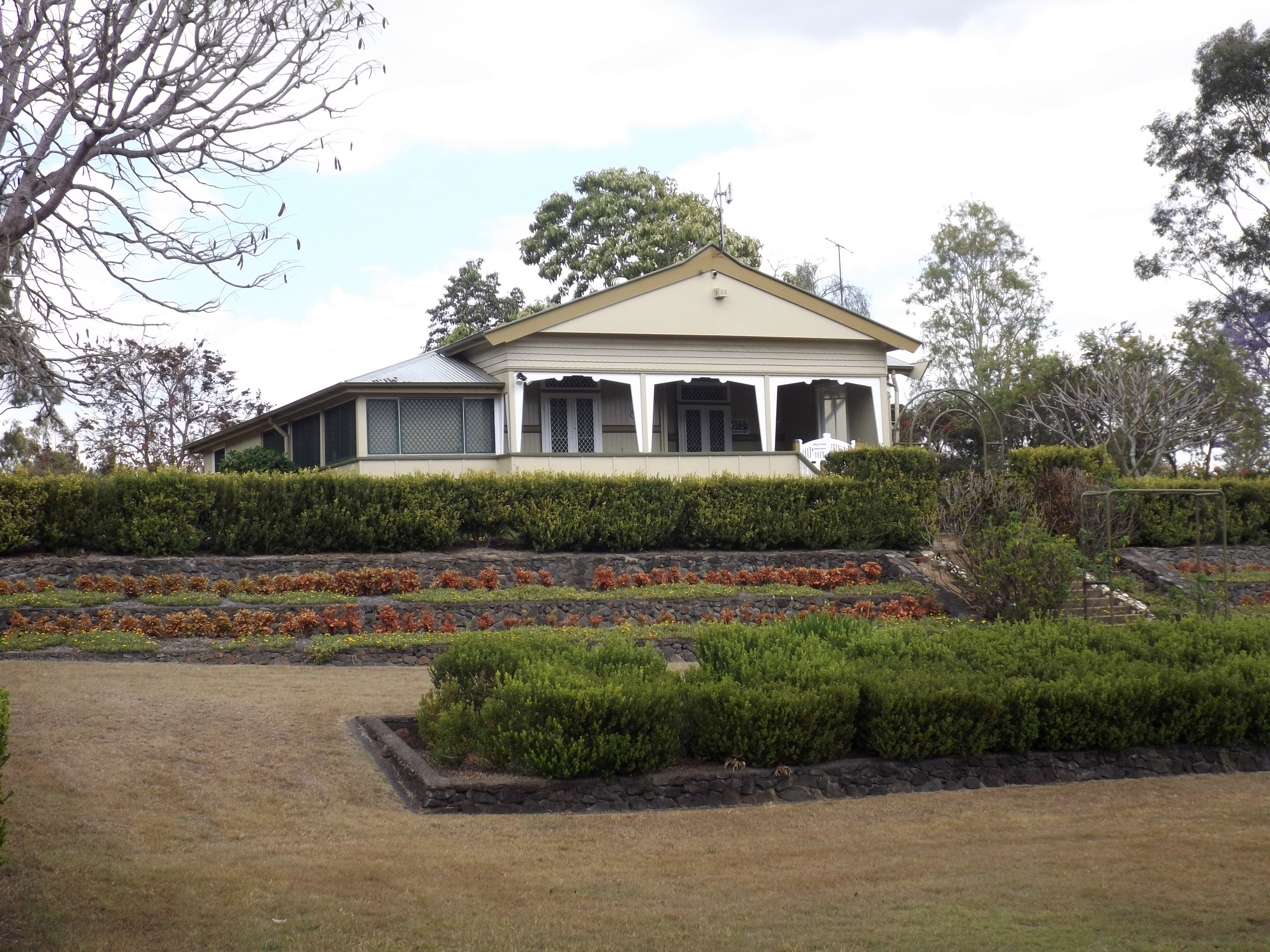
Curator's House, 2015

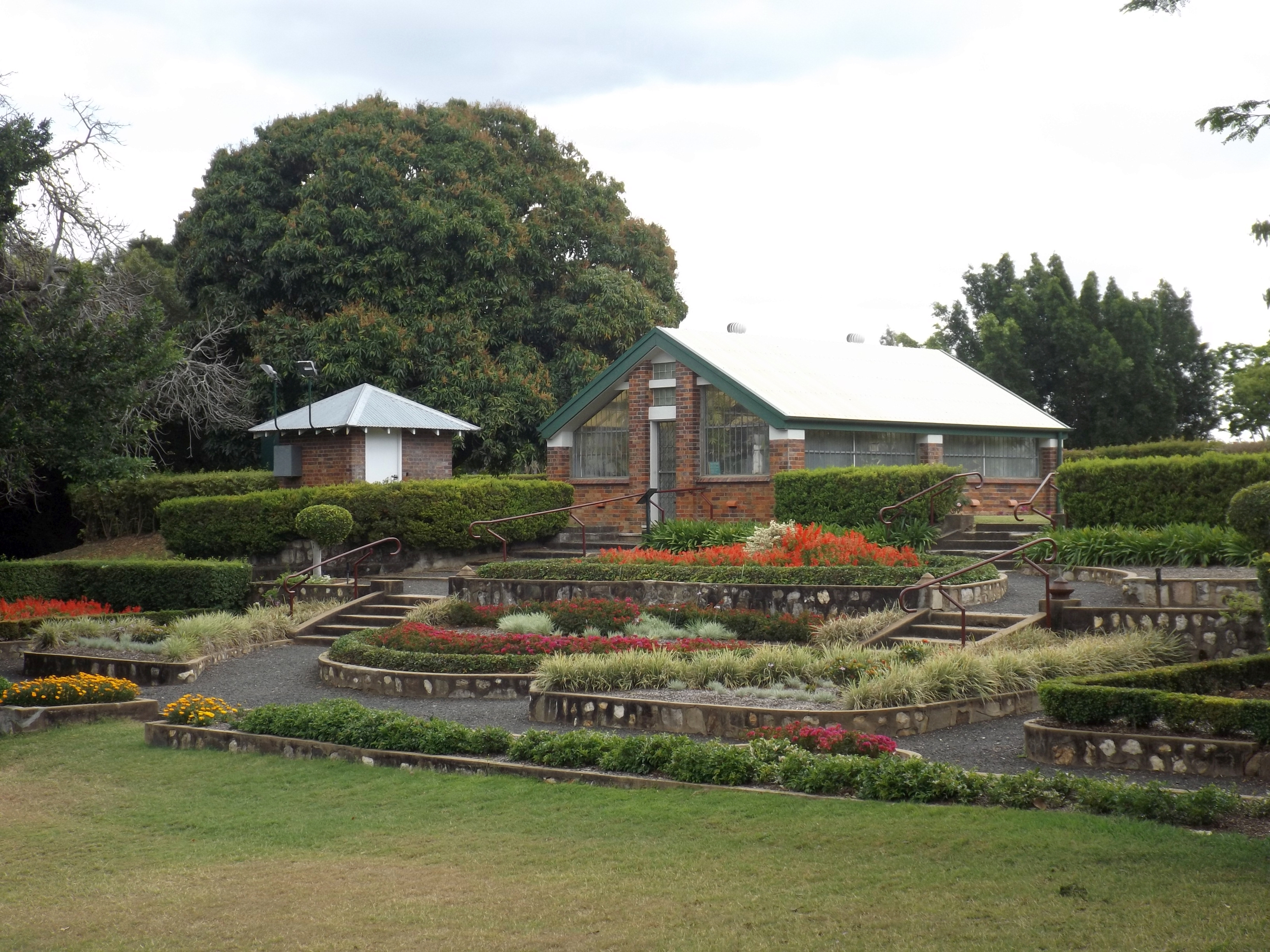
Bush houses, 2015

The park contains a number of buildings, including:

- The Curator's House is a timber building with a corrugated iron roof and is situated on a slight rise. The house has been altered internally, although it retains battened ceilings, much original joinery and some leadlight. A clipped box hedge has been cultivated in front of the house to form the words "Queens Park". There are also bougainvillea plantings around the house. Close to this are brick bush houses, the smaller of which is a 1941 bush house built by Turley.
- The Incinerator Theatre is within a fenced area and has a modern rehearsal hall nearby. Although the former incinerator was intended as an industrial building, it is also aesthetically pleasing in its form and setting and was sufficiently well regarded by the community to trigger a campaign to preserve it. Its aesthetic qualities have been important to the success of its recycling as a venue for the performing arts.
- The sports clubs premises in the Park include those of the Ipswich Lawn Tennis Association, which is located on the Chermside Road boundary near Rockton Street intersection. It has several courts and a timber clubhouse with a tiled gabled roof and a gabled porch extending over a verandah at the front. The interior contains an office, early timber shower cubicles and a kitchen.
- The Croquet Club has a court (lawn) overlooked by a timber and fibrous cement clubhouse. It is set on low concrete blocks and has a gabled roof clad in corrugated iron and topped by two decorative ventilators. The interior comprises a large open hall lit by windows with coloured glass inserts, a kitchen and (store?)
- The Ipswich Bowling Club is located in the northern section of Queens Park and comprises a two-storey late 20th century brick clubhouse and bowling greens.

Queens Park also contains several memorials. These are:

- The Macfarlane Memorial (1894). This commemorates a former Ipswich mayor and Member of Parliament John Macfarlane and is in the form of a sandstone obelisk on a corbelled base with a leaded marble plaque on the northern face. On the back of the monument, the stonemason is identified as Ernest Greenway, Ipswich.
- The WB Darker Memorial Rotunda (1949). This Rotary Club of Ipswich project is dedicated to Walter Darker; a prominent Rotarian who was Chairman of Directors of several major Brisbane companies, President of the Associated Chamber of Commerce of Australia and Chairman of the Queensland Division of the Red Cross. The shelter is hexagonal in form with a metal-clad roof supported on timber posts with decorative brackets. It shelters seating.
- The Naval Monument (1967). This faces Brisbane Street and is a cairn of concrete bricks on a concrete base and is topped by a metal anchor. A metal plaque on the base records its dedication to the naval servicemen of the Ipswich and West Moreton District.

Other built features in the park include an open-air wedding chapel, a modern kiosk and children's playground, bush houses and a nursery.

== Heritage listing ==
Queens Park was listed on the Queensland Heritage Register on 27 September 2002 having satisfied the following criteria.

The place is important in demonstrating the evolution or pattern of Queensland's history.

Queens Park is important in demonstrating the pattern of development in Queensland, being an early park reserve intended to serve the scientific and economic needs of the colony as a botanic garden and also as a place of resort for public recreation. It is also associated with the development of several sports organisations in Ipswich, the croquet, bowls and lawn tennis associations having facilities in the park from early in the 20th century.

The place demonstrates rare, uncommon or endangered aspects of Queensland's cultural heritage.

Queens Park was one of three government reserves for gardens located at the early settlements of Ipswich, Toowoomba and Warwick, other of which were later established in a few other key regional centres.

The place is important in demonstrating the principal characteristics of a particular class of cultural places.

It is a good example of its type, being an early Queens Park Reserve for botanic and recreational purposes, which began under the aegis of the Brisbane Botanic Gardens and the administration of boards of trustees chosen from prominent local citizens, then eventually passing into the control of local government authorities. It preserves examples of mature plantings, garden layout, stone walls, bush houses, rotundas and other park structures which reflect changes in ideas and usage over time.

The place is important because of its aesthetic significance.

Queens Park has aesthetic significance as a major landmark in the city of Ipswich. Its natural landform of gentle slopes and elevated position contribute to the visual character of the town and important vistas can be obtained to and from the park. It contains several major buildings of good quality design, such as the Burley Griffith incinerator, the sports clubhouses and the park curator's house and features many fine examples of stonework in local limestone.

The place has a strong or special association with a particular community or cultural group for social, cultural or spiritual reasons.

The park has a strong association with the people of Ipswich as a place of recreation, incorporating a parklands, zoo area, facilities for tennis, bowls and croquet, a band rotunda, a wedding chapel and is a source for plants for homes in Ipswich.

The place has a special association with the life or work of a particular person, group or organisation of importance in Queensland's history.

It has associations with the life and work of Walter Hill, the first Director of the Brisbane Botanic Gardens, and of the early 20th century curator, F W Turley, who oversaw much of the planting and landscape features that are still evident today and with other curators and gardeners. It is also associated with the prominent Ipswich men who served as Trustees from 1862 until the last part of the 19th century and with architects M W Haenke and W Burley Griffith who designed buildings in the park.

== Ipswich Nature Centre ==
The Ipswich Nature Centre is located within the boundaries of the park and features a number of native animal species including tiger quolls, dingoes, southern hairy-nosed wombats, swamp wallabies, brush-tailed rock wallabies, red kangaroo, greater bilbies, emus, wedge-tailed eagles, lace monitors, spotted python, saw-shelled turtles and over thirty other species of birds, mammals and reptiles.
