= East Ipswich, Queensland =

East Ipswich
- Suburb
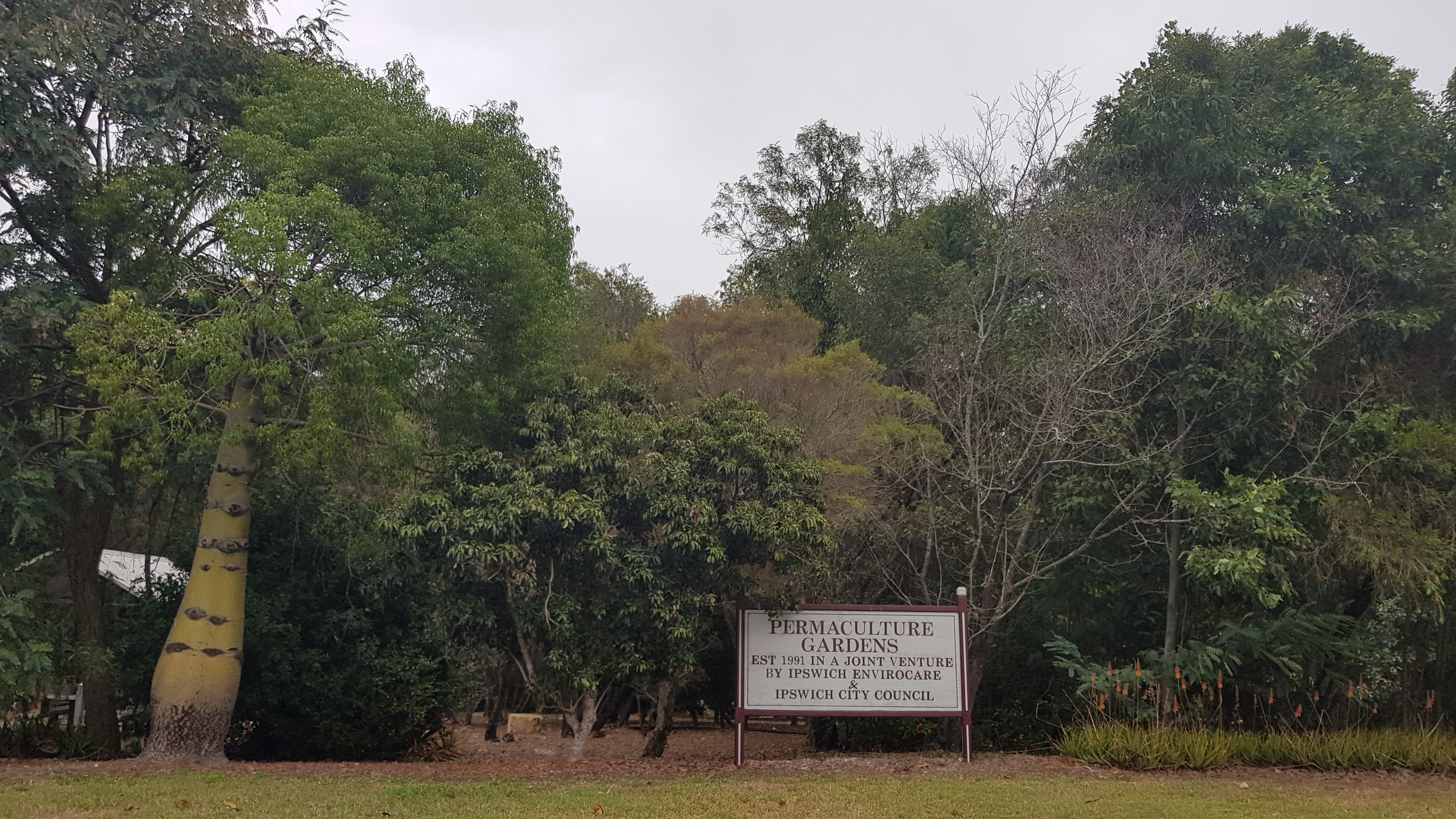
- Permaculture Gardens, 2023

- Interactive map of East Ipswich
- Coordinates: 27.6066°S 152.7761°E
- Country: Australia
- State: Queensland
- City: Ipswich
- LGA: City of Ipswich
- Location: 38.5 km (23.9 mi) from Brisbane; 2.5 km (1.6 mi) from Ipswich

Government
  - State electorate: Ipswich
  - Federal division: Blair

Area
  - Total: 1.7 km^{2} (0.66 sq mi)

Population
  - Total: 2,321 (2021 census)
  - Density: 1,370/km^{2} (3,540/sq mi)
- Time zone: UTC+10:00 (AEST)
- Postcode: 4305
Suburbs around East Ipswich
| Basin Pocket | Moores Pocket | Moores Pocket |
| North Ipswich | East Ipswich | North Booval |
| Ipswich | Newtown | Booval |

East Ipswich is a residential inner-city suburb of Ipswich in the City of Ipswich, Queensland, Australia. In the 2021 census, East Ipswich had a population of 2,321 people.

== Geography ==
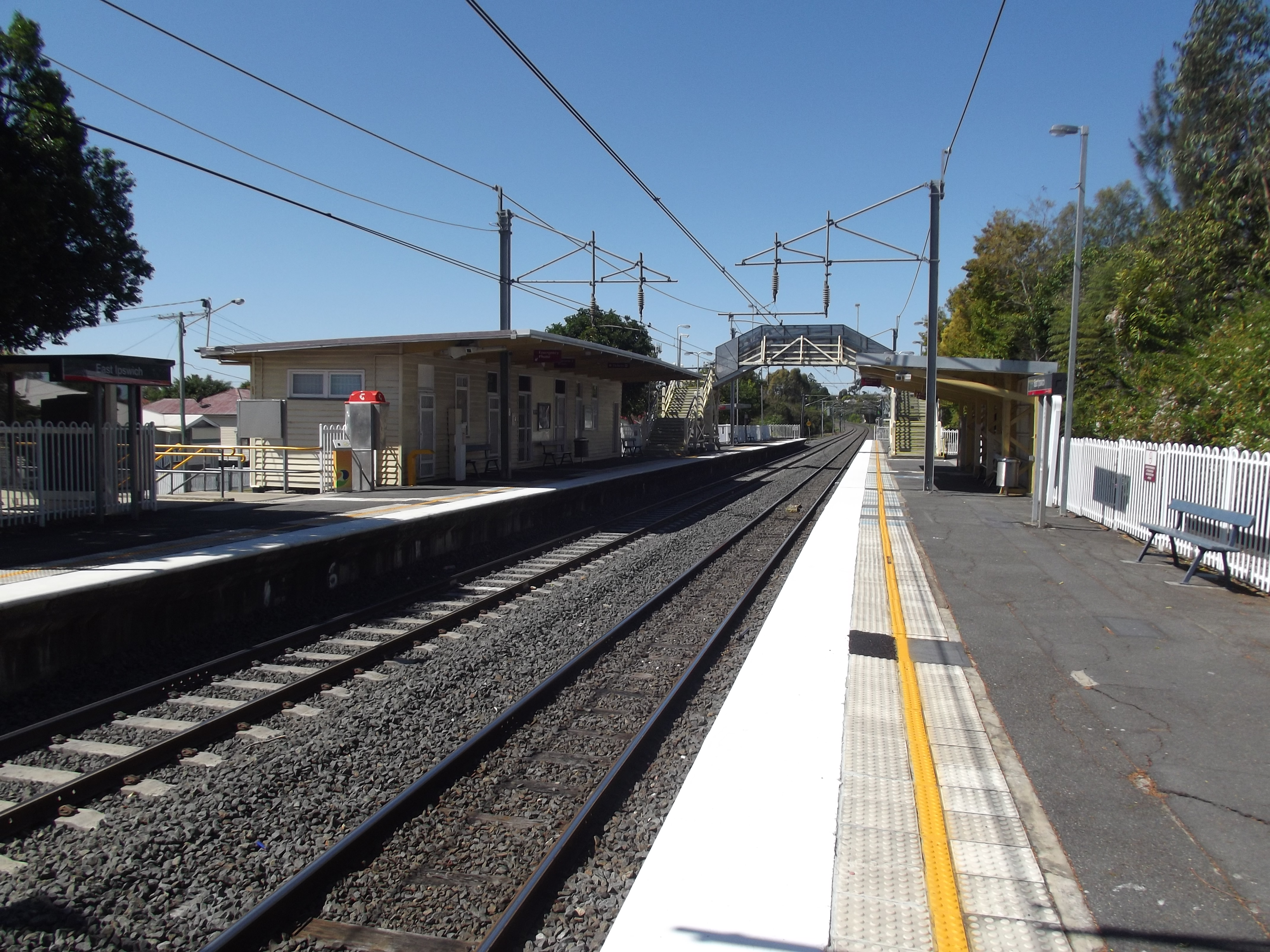
East Ipswich Railway Station, 2012

One of the older suburbs, East Ipswich is predominantly made up of weatherboard and fibro houses punctuated with larger heritage houses, and newer townhouses and flats.

The suburb is bordered on the north and west by two sections of the Bremer River (split by the small suburb of Basin Pocket); and to the south by Brisbane Road, the city's main arterial link to the Ipswich Motorway.

The Main Line railway passes through the suburb from east (Ipswich) to west (Booval); the suburb is served by the East Ipswich railway station.

A small set of shops on Jacaranda Street provides basic services, while several restaurants line Brisbane Road.

== History ==
On Sunday 12 June 1949, the Apostolic church was officially opened by Apostle Emil Zielke of Bundaberg. The ceremony was attended by almost 1,000 people. It was the first church of the Apostolic Church of Queensland to be established in Ipswich. The church had originally been erected at Waterford, but it was demolished and re-erected in East Ipswich by voluntary labour.

Ipswich East State School opened on 28 January 1958 with an initial enrolment of 166 students rising to 235 students that year.

In August 1980, East Ipswich Uniting Church congregation in Chermside Road joined Trinity Uniting Church in North Booval.

== Demographics ==
In the 2011 census, East Ipswich had a population of 2,194 people.

In the 2016 census, East Ipswich had a population of 2,410 people.

In the 2021 census, East Ipswich had a population of 2,321 people.

== Transport ==
East Ipswich railway station provides access to regular Queensland Rail City network services to Brisbane, Ipswich and Rosewood via Ipswich.

== Education ==
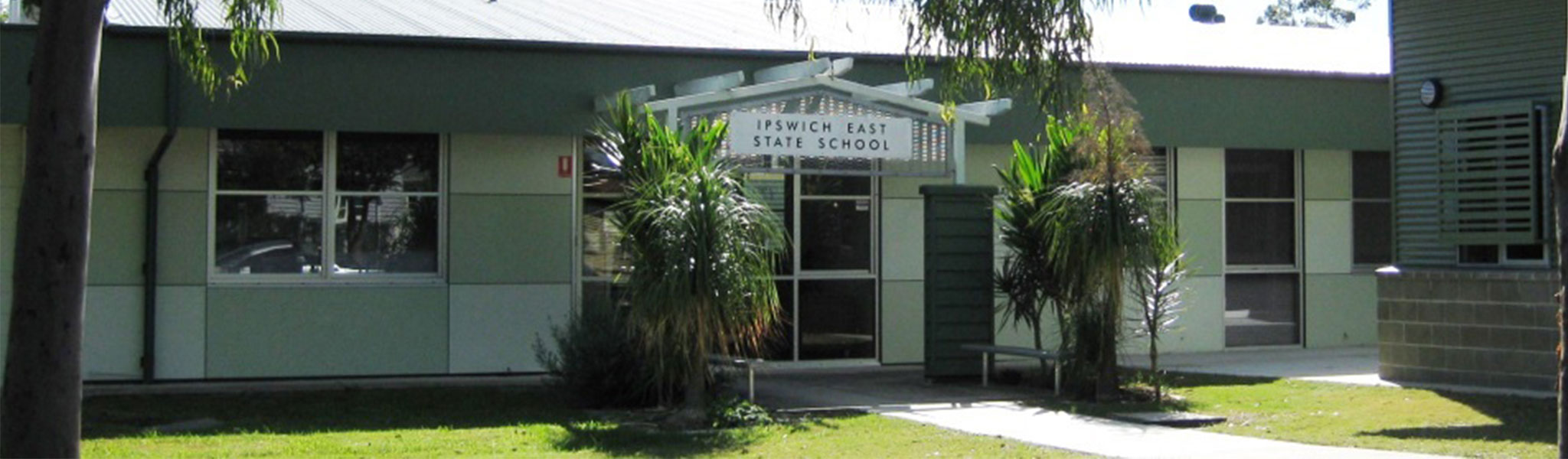
Ipswich East State School, 2024

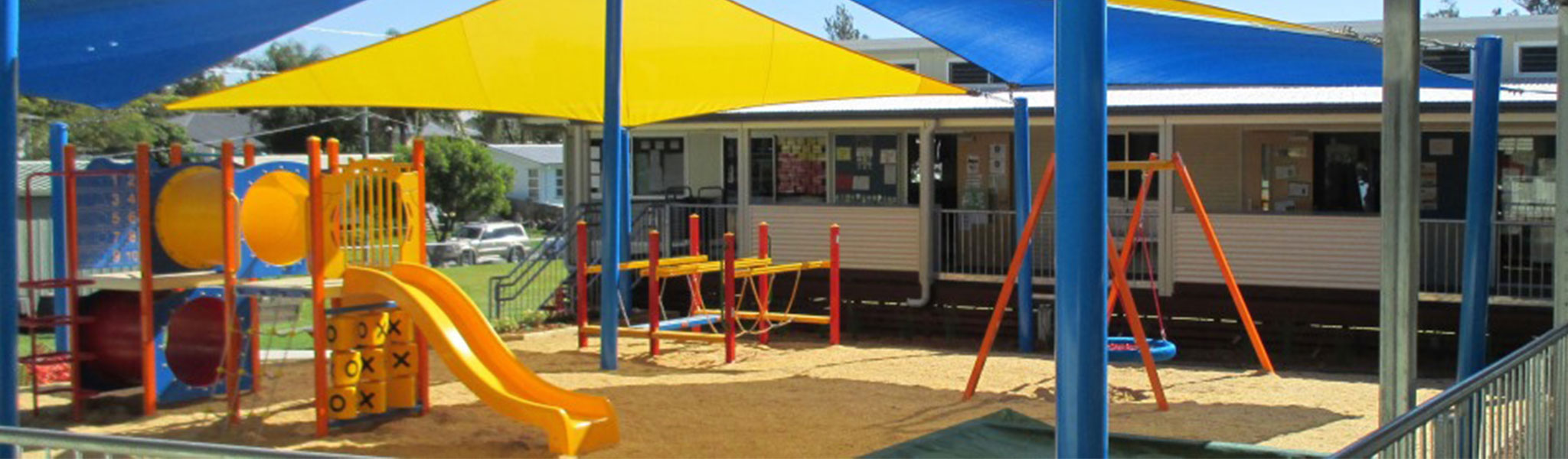
Playground, Ipswich East State School, 2024

Ipswich East State School is a government primary (Prep–6) school for boys and girls at 18–24 Jacaranda Street (27.6068°S 152.7769°E). In 2017, the school had an enrolment of 373 students with 42 teachers (35 full-time equivalent) and 28 non-teaching staff (17 full-time equivalent). It includes a special education program.

Ipswich Positive Learning Centre is a specific-purpose primary and secondary (5–10) school at 12 Blackwood Street (27.6057°S 152.7781°E).

There is no general purpose secondary school in East Ipswich. The nearest government secondary schools are Bremer State High School in Ipswich CBD and Bundamba State Secondary College in Bundamba.

== Sports facilities ==
- Hockey/mixed use field
- Vigoro ground which hosts seasonal competitions
- West End Rugby league Football Club
- Ipswich United Services Bowls Club

== Places of worship ==
The Apostolic Church is at 25 Kendall Street.

== Heritage listings ==
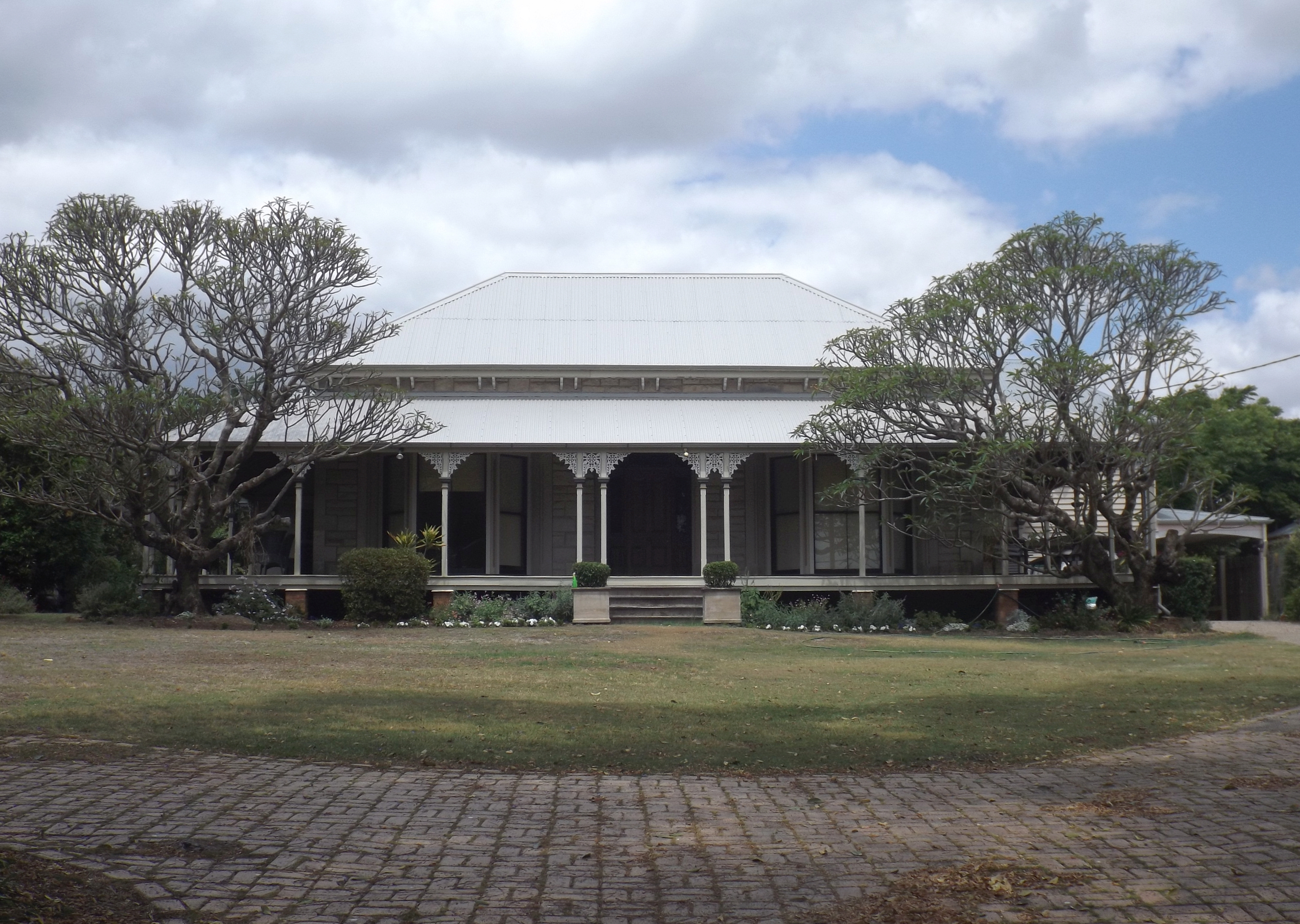
The Kyeewa residence dates from around 1890.

East Ipswich has a number of heritage-listed sites, including:

- 1 York Street: Kyeewa
