= Walter Burley Griffin Incinerator, Ipswich =

Former Australian incinerator

Walter Burley Griffin Incinerator
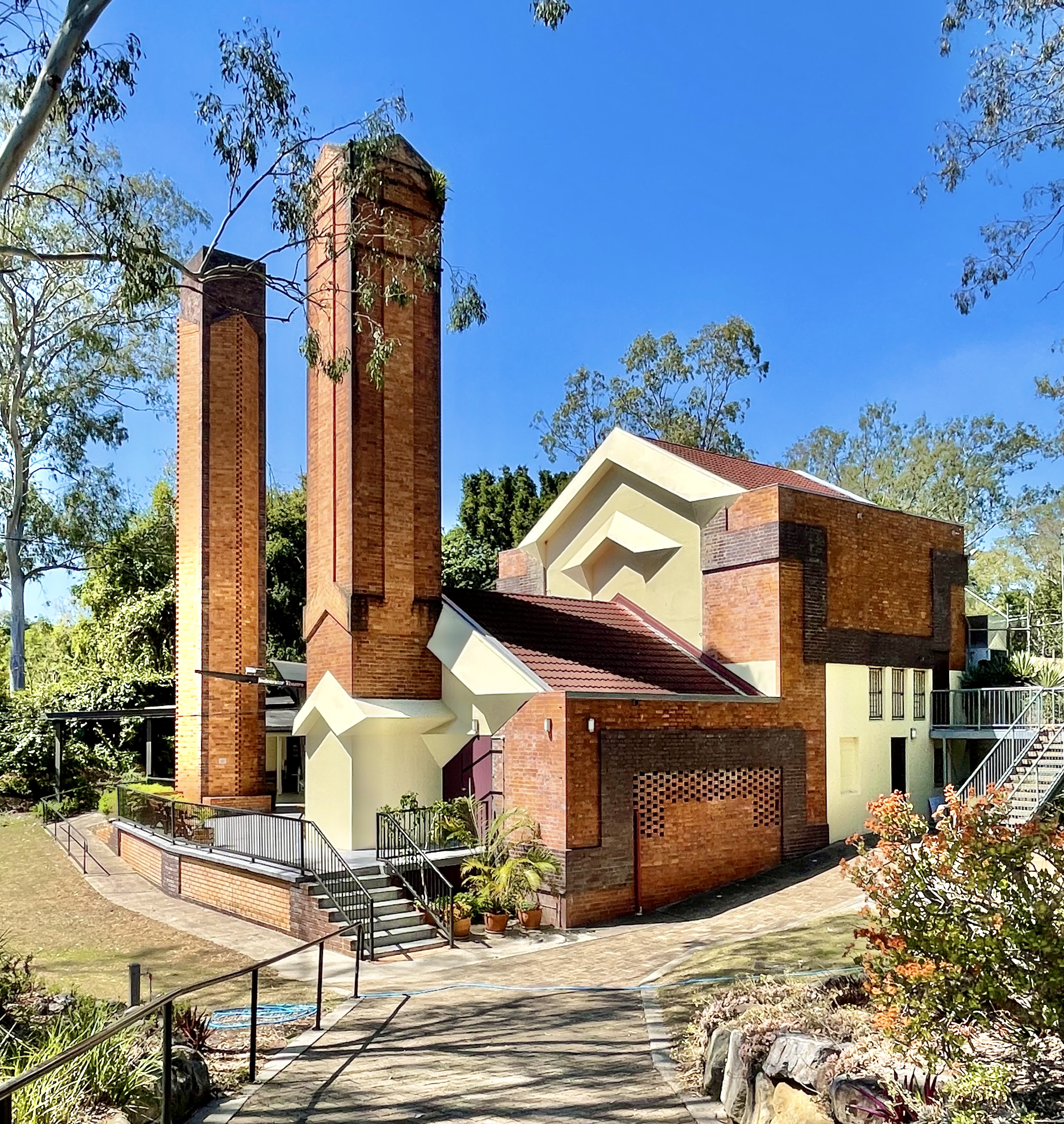
- Walter Burley Griffin Incinerator, 2021

- Location within Queensland Location within Australia
- 27.6195°S 152.7669°E
- Location: 10A Milford Street, Ipswich, City of Ipswich, Queensland, Australia

History
- Design period: 1919–1930s (interwar period)
- Built: 1936–1940

Site notes
- Architect: Walter Burley Griffin

Queensland Heritage Register
- Official name: Walter Burley Griffin Incinerator (former), The Incinerator Theatre
- Type: state heritage (built)
- Designated: 21 October 1992
- Reference no.: 600596
- Significant period: 1936–1940 (fabric); 1930s–1960s (historical)
- Significant components: chimney/chimney stack

Walter Burley Griffin Incinerator is a heritage-listed former incinerator at 10A Milford Street, Ipswich, City of Ipswich, Queensland, Australia. It was designed by Walter Burley Griffin and built from 1936 to 1940. It is also known as The Incinerator Theatre. It was added to the Queensland Heritage Register on 21 October 1992.

== History ==
The Incinerator Theatre, situated in Queen's Park, Ipswich and opened in 1969, was converted from a 1936 refuse incinerator designed by Walter Burley Griffin for the city of Ipswich.

Architect Walter Burley Griffin was born and educated in America and graduated from the renowned school of architecture at the University of Illinois in 1899. Between 1901 and 1906 he was an associate of the famous architect Frank Lloyd Wright. In 1911 he entered a design competition for the future capital of Australia. His winning entry served as the basis for the design of Canberra and Griffin moved to Australia where he designed a number of significant buildings such as the Capitol Theatre in Melbourne and the Sydney suburb of Castlecrag. During the Great Depression, work for architects was severely reduced and Griffin and his partner, Eric Milton Nicholls, gained the bulk of their work from designs for municipal incinerators. These utilised the reverberatory system patented by Australian engineer John Boadle. The Reverberatory Incinerator Company constructed twelve incinerators in the eastern states, all of distinctive design. Only six are believed to survive, none of them as incinerators. The construction of the Ipswich incinerator was supervised by local architect George Brockwell Gill and was opened in 1936. It is the only building designed by Walter Burley Griffin in Queensland.

To implement the processing of rubbish, the incinerator was built into a hill to allow road access to the top and bottom of the building. On the upper level, trucks carrying rubbish backed in through roller doors and dumped their cargo into hoppers. The refuse was then raked into two burning chambers. Unburned residue was doused with water then hauled by electric motor to an area to the west of the incinerator. The building was initially designed with one chimney, but adding a second work unit and chimney in 1940 extended its capacity. As Griffin was by then dead, it is assumed that his partner, Eric Nicholls, designed these.

The incinerator was designed to process the rubbish generated by a city of 20,000 people, but by 1960 the population of Ipswich was twice this number. Moreover, by this time it was no longer thought environmentally appropriate to dispose of rubbish by burning. Use of the incinerator was therefore discontinued and as the empty building began to be targeted by vandals, in 1965 the council considered demolishing it. Many people wished to see the building retained and a symposium sponsored by the Ipswich Chamber of Commerce supported its preservation. The Ipswich branch of the Arts Council approached the Ipswich City Council who agreed to grant them a short-term lease providing that a viable use for the building was found. Following several renewals of this lease, in 1969, the Ipswich Little Theatre decided that the building should be converted to an intimate theatre and contributed financially to this project.

The Ipswich Little Theatre is a community theatre formed in 1946 after the pattern of the Little Theatre movement in Britain. Amateur theatre has been important in the development of Australian drama as it provided an opportunity for local playwrights to be heard, as professional theatres tended to stage British and American productions. When commercial theatre declined during the Depression, amateur dramatic societies became a significant part of the cultural life of Australia, being the only form of live performance accessible to a large section of the community. They have been and still are a training ground for actors, playwrights, directors and designers and have given the public an opportunity to hear locally written drama. Ipswich Little Theatre has always fostered local writers although they have also produced Australian and imported plays.

Since its inception, the need for a cheap and readily available venue for meetings, rehearsals and performances had been a constant problem. Initially, the society used the CWA clubrooms, the Cambrian Hall and the Old Ipswich Town Hall for performances with meetings and rehearsals held at various places including private homes. Once the society began to acquire scenery, props etc. the need for a permanent venue became more pressing and a fund for this purpose was started in the mid-1950s. Progress received a setback when television arrived and eroded the interest of the public in live theatre. In 1966 the Little Theatre moved to the 4IP building in Brisbane Street. Performances were held at the Town Hall. However, in 1969 this closed and was no longer available as a venue.

In this year the Incinerator was converted into a theatre seating about 80 people. The conversion was effected by using the chimney end of the building, previously thought of as the rear, as the entrance. Engineer Ian Pullar, a member of the Little Theatre, carried out the design and planning. Changes made to effect the conversion included adding an entrance balcony with removable railings, toilets and changing rooms, fire escapes and a covered outdoor area. A rubbish hopper was removed to create a stage area and scenery tower and the space previously used for machinery was converted into an auditorium. The theatre was opened on 22 November 1969 by the Ipswich Little Theatre Company as the Incinerator Theatre.

In 1974 when the Ipswich Branch of the Arts Council went into indefinite recess a new group comprising ILT members and members of the community was formed to continue conversion of the incinerator and promotion of cultural activities. In 1977 ILT took over the lease and responsibility for the building. The available space was not quite adequate and in 1982 a new building designed by Graham Killoran and named the Jean Pratt building was constructed nearby for meetings, rehearsals and storage. The pressed aluminium roof provided to the incinerator in 1966 proved unsatisfactory and was replaced by tiles in 1988. A paved courtyard was created. The first conversion work to the incinerator had provided only primitive facilities and a new amenities building designed by Bruce Buchanan Architects was opened in 1994 to provide better catering facilities and public toilets. The Ipswich Little Theatre Society currently has a twenty-year lease from the Ipswich City Council

== Description ==
The incinerator is in a landscaped setting within Queen's Park. The original building comprises two interlocking gable-roofed brick structures partially set into a hillside. The section to the east is four storeys high and that to the west two storeys high. An additional chimney stands alongside the building. The design includes moulded brickwork and concrete dressings but has fewer decorative elements than Griffin's other incinerators. The floors are concrete and the roof timber framed and clad with tiles. The theatre is entered by steps going up onto the flue between the chimneys and the stage has been installed at the far end in the tipping area. The lowest floor level behind the stage has facilities for the actors including a small kitchen. The level above this has dressing rooms and toilets and the top level, where trucks entered, is now used for the storage of scenery flats.

A rehearsal building has been constructed to the west of the incinerator and is a single storey brick building known as the Jean Pratt Building.

Immediately to the north of the former incinerator is a single storey concrete kitchen and amenities block built in 1994.

== Heritage listing ==
The former Walter Burley Griffin Incinerator was listed on the Queensland Heritage Register on 21 October 1992 having satisfied the following criteria.

The place is important in demonstrating the evolution or pattern of Queensland's history.

The construction, use, expansion and eventual obsolescence of the former Ipswich municipal incinerator demonstrates a growing concern with public health during the twentieth century and of the civic programs undertaken to promote it. In its secondary use as a community theatre the building also provides evidence for the contribution made by the Little Theatre movement to the growth of cultural life in Australia.

The place demonstrates rare, uncommon or endangered aspects of Queensland's cultural heritage.

The former incinerator is one of only six surviving examples of the twelve incinerators of this type built in Australia. It is also the only example of the work of architect Walter Burley Griffin in Queensland.

The place is important because of its aesthetic significance.

Although the former incinerator was intended as an industrial building, it is also aesthetically pleasing in its form and setting and was sufficiently well regarded by the community to trigger a campaign to preserve it. Its aesthetic qualities have been important to the success of its recycling as a venue for the performing arts.

The place has a strong or special association with a particular community or cultural group for social, cultural or spiritual reasons.

As the first permanent home of the Ipswich Little Theatre Society, the building has a special connection with this community theatre which has made an important contribution to the cultural life of Ipswich.

The place has a special association with the life or work of a particular person, group or organisation of importance in Queensland's history.

The former incinerator has a special association with the life and works of Walter Burley Griffin, illustrating a phase of his career and being as the only work by this architect in Queensland.

== See also ==
- Walter Burley Griffin Incinerator, Willoughby
- Walter Burley Griffin Incinerator, Essendon
