= North Booval, Queensland =

North Booval Ipswich, Queensland
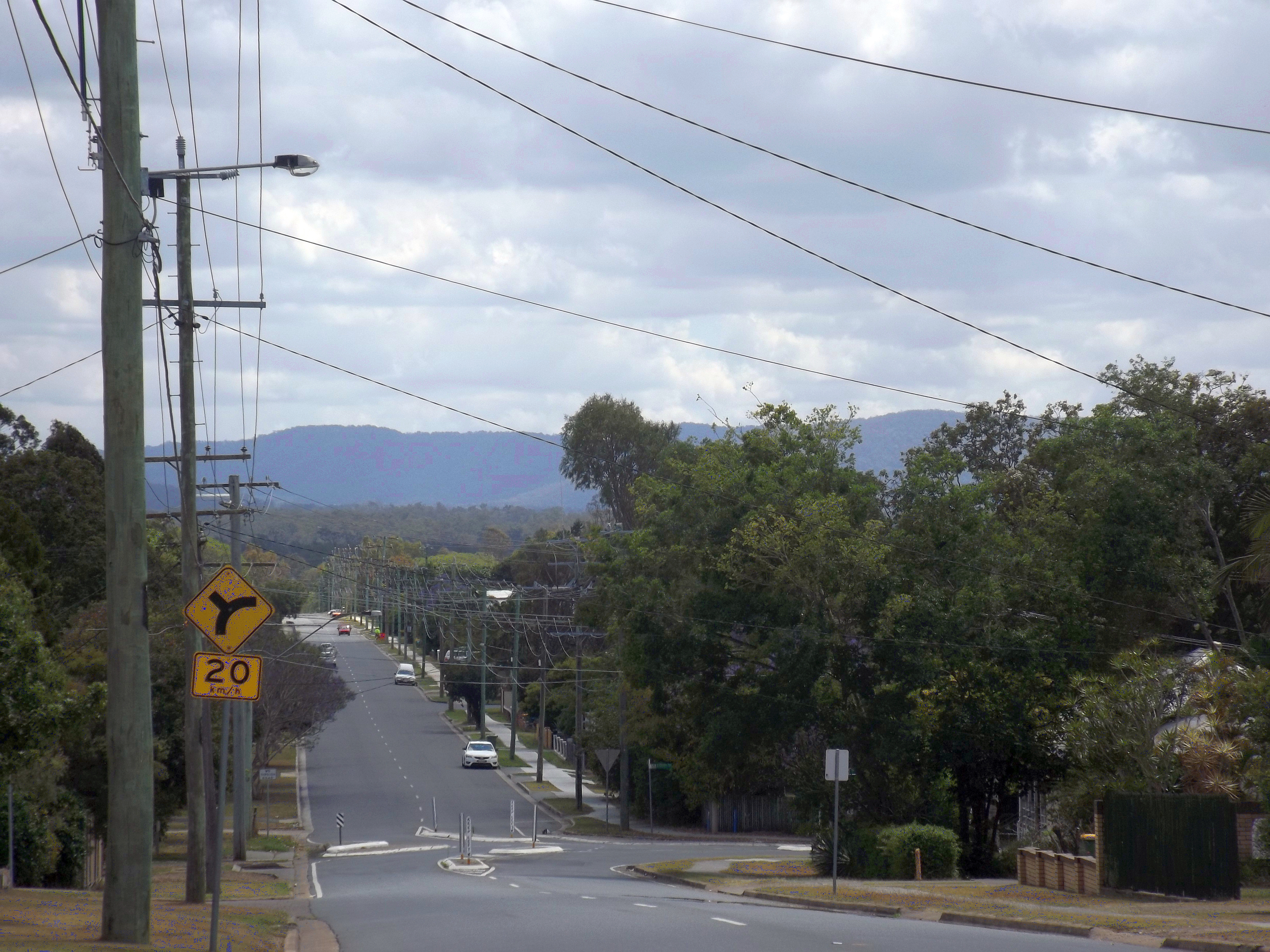
- North Station Road, 2015

- Coordinates: 27.5975°S 152.7911°E
- Population: 3,041 (2021 census)
  - Density: 1,014/km^{2} (2,630/sq mi)
- Postcode(s): 4304
- Area: 3.0 km^{2} (1.2 sq mi)
- Time zone: AEST (UTC+10:00)
- Location: 5.8 km (4 mi) NE of Ipswich CBD; 38.1 km (24 mi) SW of Brisbane
- LGA(s): City of Ipswich
- State electorate(s): Ipswich
- Federal division(s): Blair
Suburbs around North Booval:
Tivoli	North Tivoli	Bundamba
Moores Pocket	North Booval	Bundamba
East Ipswich	Booval	Bundamba

North Booval is a suburb of Ipswich in the City of Ipswich, Queensland, Australia. In the 2021 census, North Booval had a population of 3,041 people.

== Geography ==
North Booval is bounded to the north and west by the Bremer River, to the east by Bundamba Creek, and to the south by the Main Line railway.

The land use is predominantly residential, except for the northern river flats which is used for grazing on native vegetation.

== History ==
Trinity Ipswich Uniting Church was formed in July 1970 as a cooperative parish of a number of Ipswich churches:

- Booval Congregational Church, originally located on the corner of Brisbane Road and South Station Road until December 1969, and then at a house on the corner of Sloman Street and South Station Road where it closed in July 1970
- North Booval Presbyterian Church in Bridge Street
- North Booval Methodist Church in Tuggerah Street

The cooperative parish operated from a number of its predecessors' premises until a new church building at 114 Jacaranda Street was dedicated on 15 September 1973. During the 1974 floods, the Bridge Street church was used to store contents from flooded homes and as an office for people requiring assistance because of the floods. It was later moved to the Jacaranda Street site as a hall, while the Tuggerah Street church was moved to the Jacaranda Street site as a kindergarten. Following the amalgamation of the Methodist, Presbyterian and Congregational Churches into the Uniting Church in Australia in 1977, the co-operative parish was renamed Trinity Uniting Church.

In August 1980, East Ipswich Uniting Church congregation in Chermside Road joined Trinity Uniting Church. Later Bundamba Uniting Church and Blackstone Uniting Church also joined Trinity Uniting Church which was then renamed Trinity Ipswich Uniting Church.

== Demographics ==
In the 2016 census, North Booval had a population of 3,175 people.

In the 2021 census, North Booval had a population of 3,041 people.

== Transport ==
North Booval is serviced by Booval railway station, which is located on its southern border.

== Parks and sports facilities ==
- MJ Kinnane Park
- Rossner-Gibney Park
- Jack Barkley Park
- Fail Park

== Amenities ==
Trinity Uniting Church is at 114 Jacaranda Street. It is part of the Bremer-Brisbane Presbytery, and is one of four congregations co-operating together as the Uniting Churches of Ipswich. The congregation includes people from the Pacific Island nation of Niue, which holds services in their Niuean language on some weeks and joins with the main congregation for shared worship in other weeks.

Vision Christian Family is in Gledson Street.

== Education ==
There are no schools in North Booval. The nearest primary school is Ipswich East State School is East Ipswich. The nearest secondary school is Bundamba State Secondary College in Bundamba.
