= Booval House =

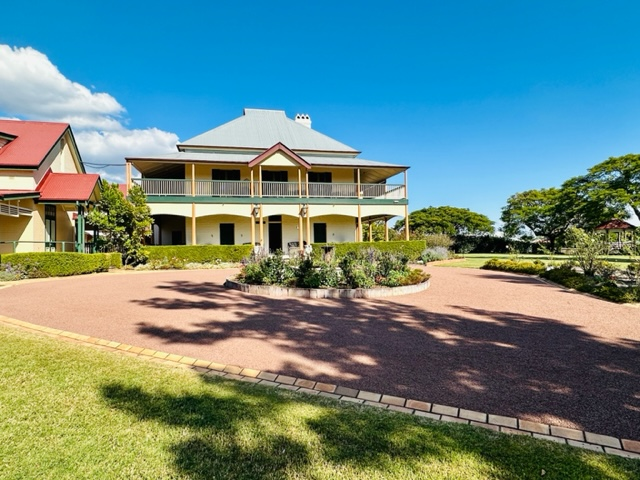
- Booval House in 2023

- Location within Queensland Location within Australia
- 27.6155°S 152.7938°E
- Location: 14 Cothill Road, Booval, City of Ipswich, Queensland, Australia

History
- Design period: 1840s–1860s (mid-19th century)
- Built: 1857–1896

Queensland Heritage Register
- Official name: Booval House, St Gabriel's Convent
- Type: state heritage (landscape, built)
- Designated: 21 August 1992
- Reference no.: 600549
- Significant period: 1850s, 1890s (fabric); 1850s–1890s (historical); 1930s– (social)
- Significant components: service wing, cellar, garden/grounds, residential accommodation – main house
- Builders: William Hancock

Booval House is a heritage-listed detached house at 14 Cothill Road, Booval, City of Ipswich, Queensland, Australia. It was built in 1857 by William Hancock and extended in 1896 to a design by George Brockwell Gill. It is also known as St Gabriel's Convent. It was added to the Queensland Heritage Register on 21 August 1992.

== History ==
Booval House is a two-storey brick house built in the 1850s for George Faircloth, manager of the Bank of Australasia in Ipswich. The builder was William Hancock and the architect was probably William Wakeling.

In December 1859, Faircloth stated in a testimonial that architect William Wakeling had been engaged by him privately, as well as being engaged for supervision of St Paul's Anglican Church. This private commission was most probably Booval House.

The original dwelling at Booval Estate circa 1861

The house was completed by at least 20 December 1859 when Queensland Governor George Bowen stopped there for refreshments and a change of clothing at the start of his first visit to Ipswich. It was the first major house in the Booval area.

In October 1853, Faircloth was transferred to Ipswich to pen the first 'northern' branch of the Bank of Australasia. He purchased Booval Estate lands consisting of 310 acres (130 ha) from Charles Daveney in February 1856. The title purchase was from the colony of New South Wales. Queensland had not yet become a colony itself. The country estate was 3 miles (4.8 km) from Ipswich Town.

In the 1850s, Faircloth had invested in Moggill Coal Mine, in collaboration with John Panton, Henry Buckley, Louis Hope and Frederick Bigge. Flooding and exhaustion of coal led to closure of the mine and the company was wound up in 1861.

This may have been a factor in Faircloths's later loss of Booval House, but perhaps of greater significance was his dealings as bank manager. In 1855 he was cautioned by the bank's superintendent because he had exceeded the bank's lending limits. This related especially to lending money to Joseph Fleming, the founder of a large industrial village ( Bremer Mills) on the Bremer River at Bundamba. By 1859, Fleming had borrowed 30,000 Pounds, half of the bank's cash. In 1860, Faircloth was 'warned' again by the Superintendent but Faircloth continued to provide advances. By December 1861, the cash account at Ipswich had run up to £200,000. By July 1862, Faircloth was dismissed, resulting in the loss of his 900 Pounds salary. Fleming's Mills were sold by the Bank of Australasia.

Faircloth then took over the business of Walter Gray & Co, but that also failed.

Of note is that Faircloth mortgaged Booval Estate to the (then) Bank of Queensland in 1860.

In the early 1860s, many Ipswich people started cotton plantations to take advantage of a worldwide shortage caused by the American Civil War. Faircloth grew cotton on much of the 40 acres (16 ha) surrounding his house. Adjacent to his land was that of the Ipswich Cotton Company under its chairman John Panton; Faircloth sold portion of his farm, in 1861, to the Ipswich Cotton Co which had 100 acres (40 ha) under cultivation and exported its first 30 bales in July 1862. However, cotton did not fulfil its early expectations and many companies and individual growers lost money .

Booval House was auctioned in 1868 under instructions from the liquidators, the Bank of Queensland.

The purchaser was William Welsby, a local builder (and father of author Thomas Welsby).

The 1868 and 1874 auction notices provide invaluable records of the property at those times.

Welsby died suddenly in 1873. The property was auctioned in 1874, and the purchaser was John Ferrett, the former Trustee of Ipswich Cotton Co. Ferrett had opened a coalmine, the Radstock Pit at Woodend in the 1850s and later had an interest in the adjacent Woodend Mine. He also appears to have continued farming to some extent at Booval House.

Booval House was advertised for rent in 1884, the reason uncertain. According to Ferrett family records, the Ferrett's moved to another residence at Brisbane Road, Ipswich, closer to Ipswich Town. After John Ferrett died in 1894, control of the property passed to his nephew Harry who was also involved in coal-mining in the Bundamba area, financing the Borehole Mine. In 1896, architect George Brockwell Gill called tenders for a timber extension to the rear of the house and a new iron roof.

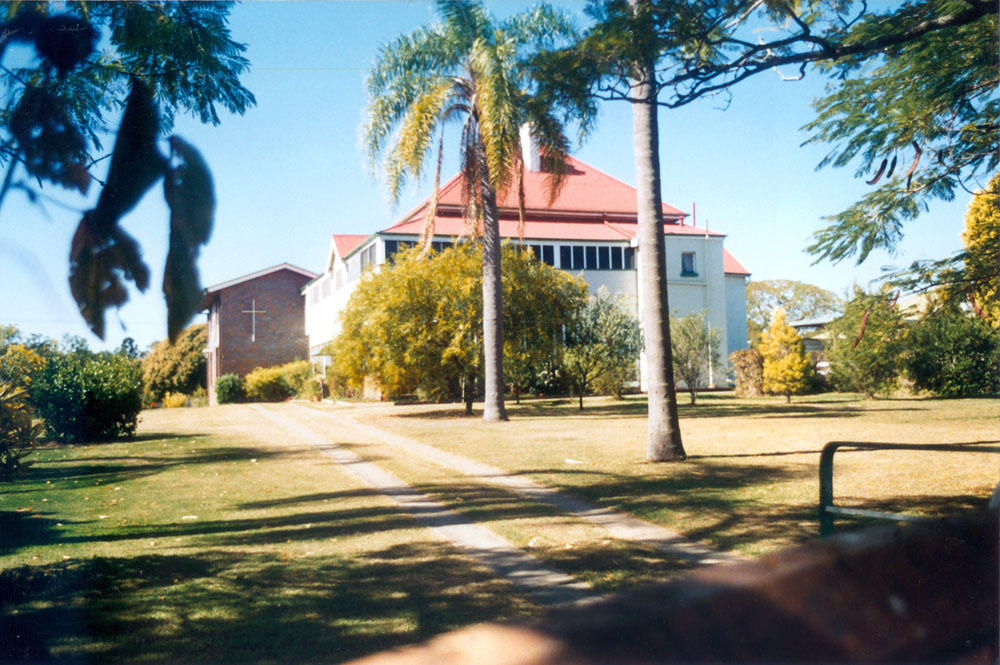
Years of maintenance dereliction and decline hid Booval House from the community

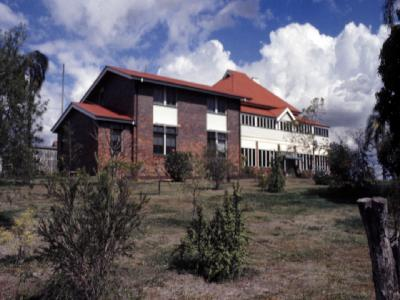
The chapel connected to the main house

Booval House remained in the Ferrett family until 1921 when it was sold to the Catholic Church. After standing empty for several years, it was renovated and reopened in 1930 as St Gabriel's Convent for the Sisters of Mercy. A convent school was built adjacent to the house.

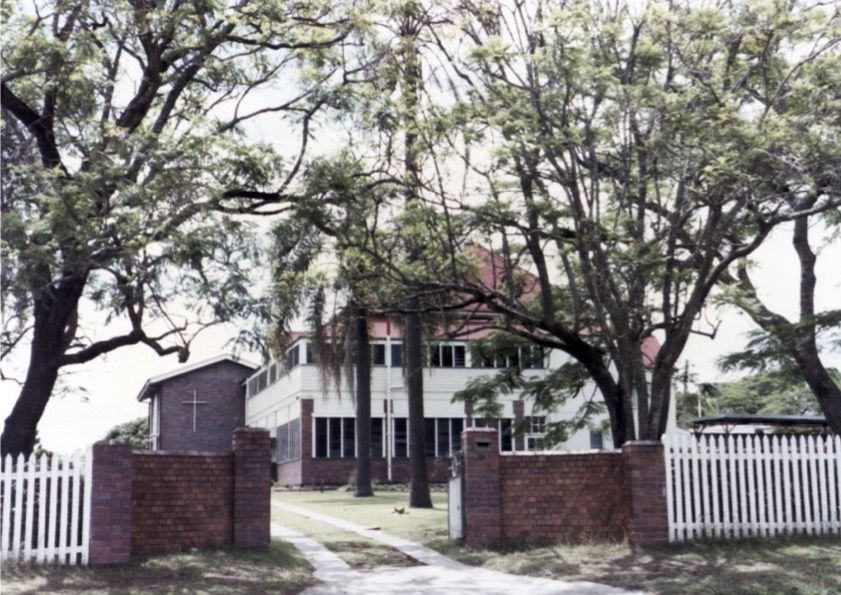
Looking at Booval House from Cothill Road

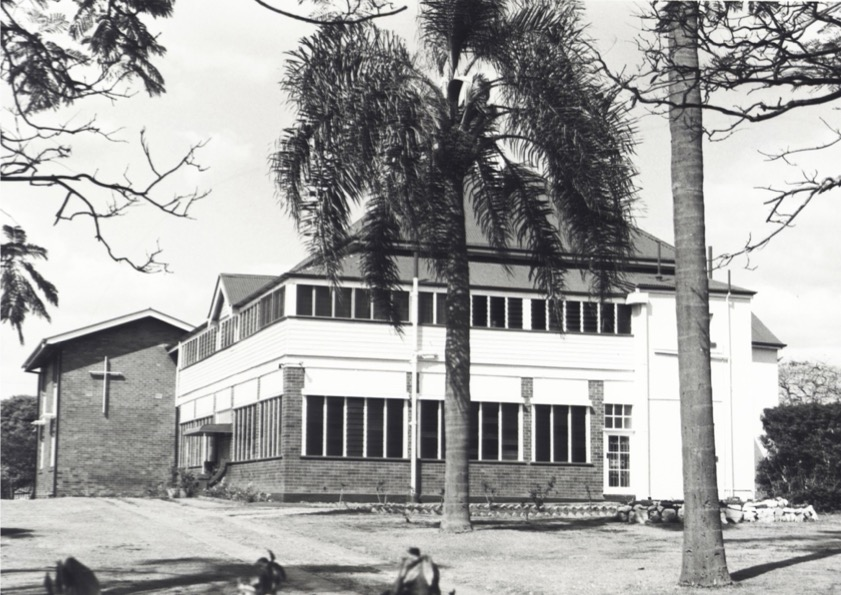
When Booval House was a convent

Following termite damage in 1946, the verandahs were altered and brick supporting columns were built. A brick extension containing a chapel and bedrooms was added in 1969. The number of sisters declined in the 1980s and the house was empty for some time, then was sold in September 1997.

Booval House was purchased by gynaecologist Dr David Baartz in 2018. The chapel was restored to its Catholic heritage and blessed by Father James O'Donoghue of St Mary's Church, Ipswich, as the Chapel of John Paul the Great. Renewal of the gardens has been undertaken to carry on the legacy of this historic Ipswich residence.

In July 2021, Dr Omar Mansour, an Ipswich surgeon purchased Booval House.

After acquiring Booval House from Dr Baartz, to establish as a family home, Booval House underwent some modifications to cater and comfort a young growing family. Minimally invasive ducted air conditioning was installed in the main house, solar panels added to the steep carport roofs, and a pool at the eastern end of the property.

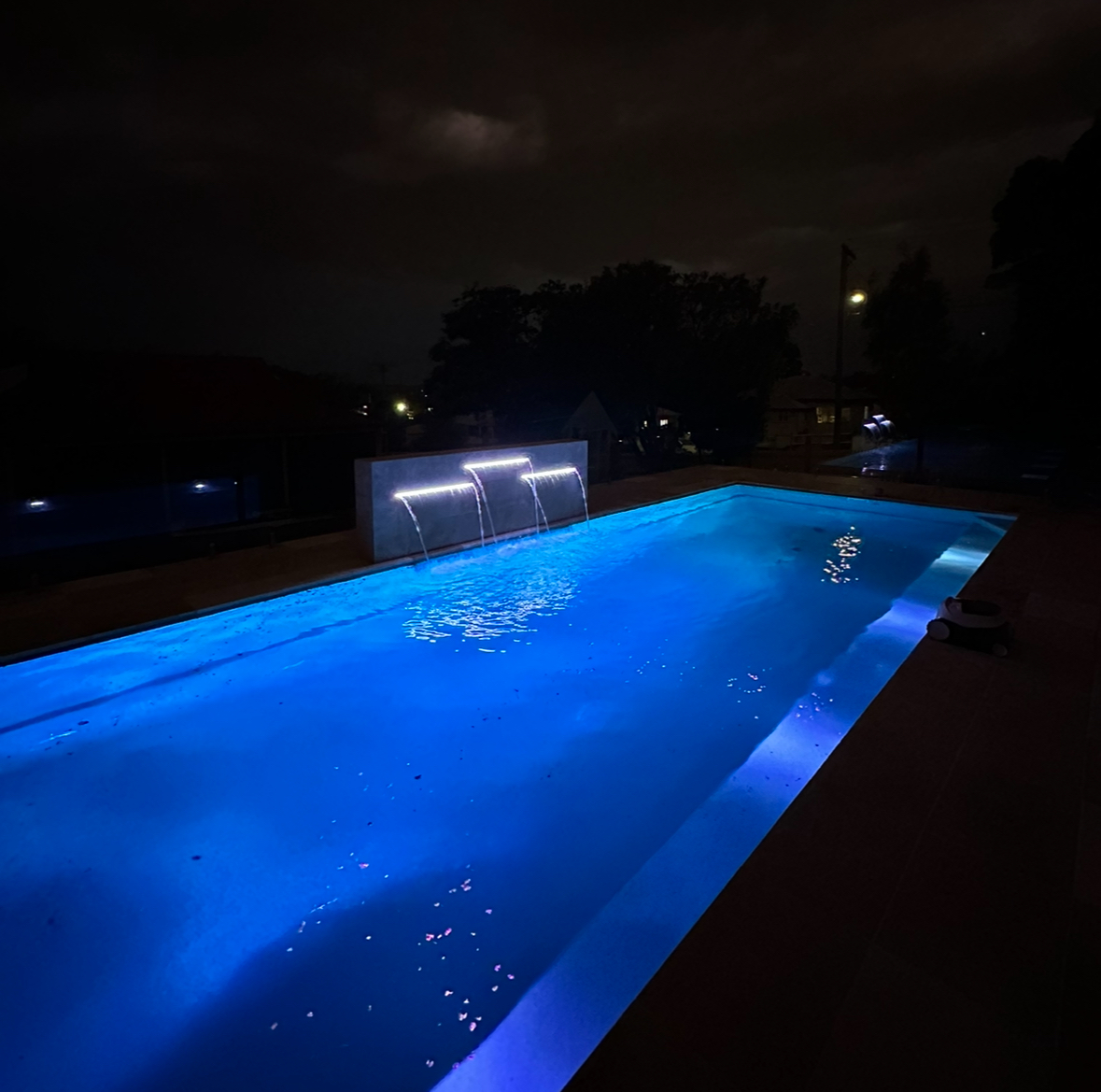
A 21st century home boasting all the comforts.

== Description ==
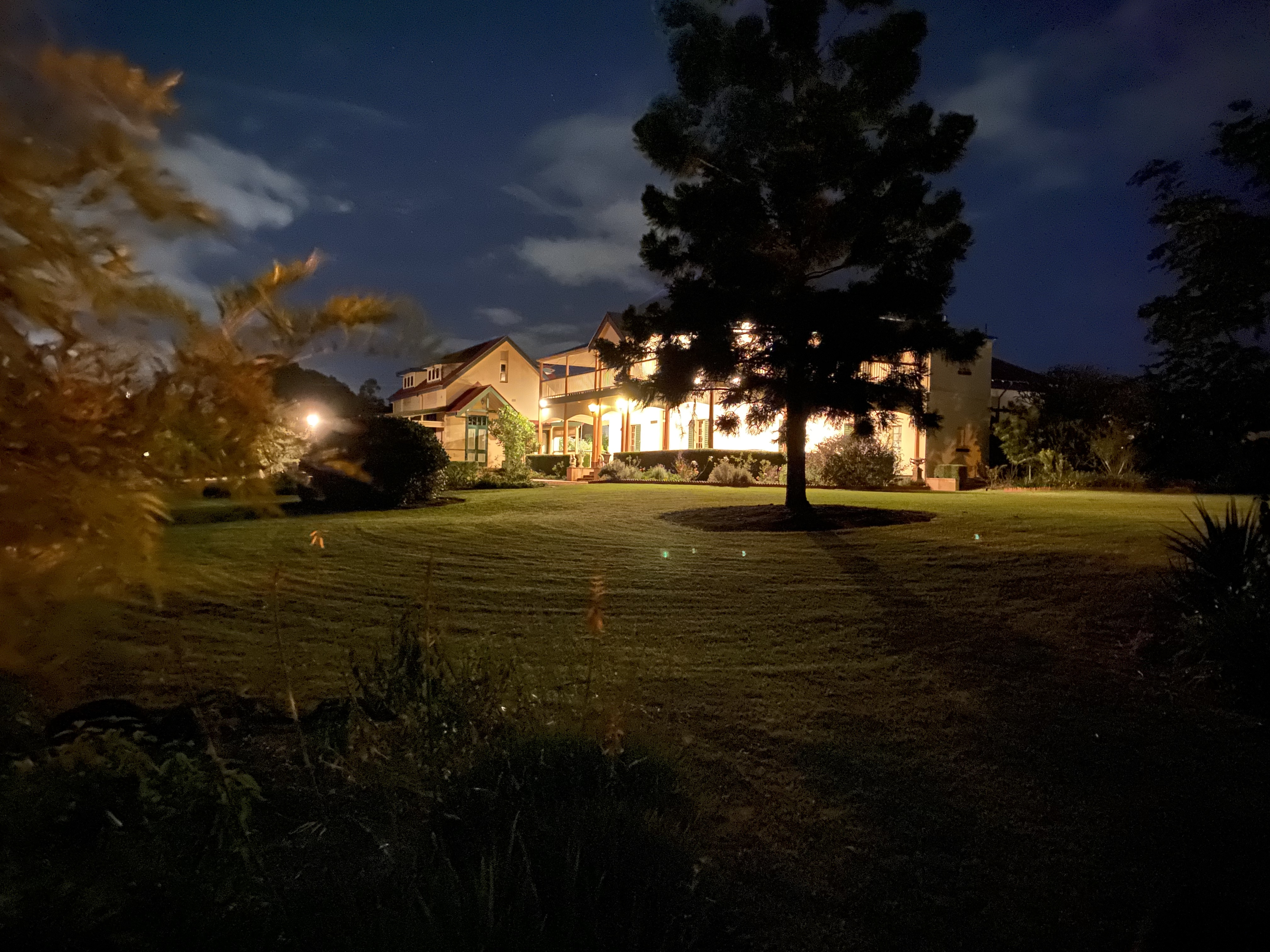
Booval House lit up at night

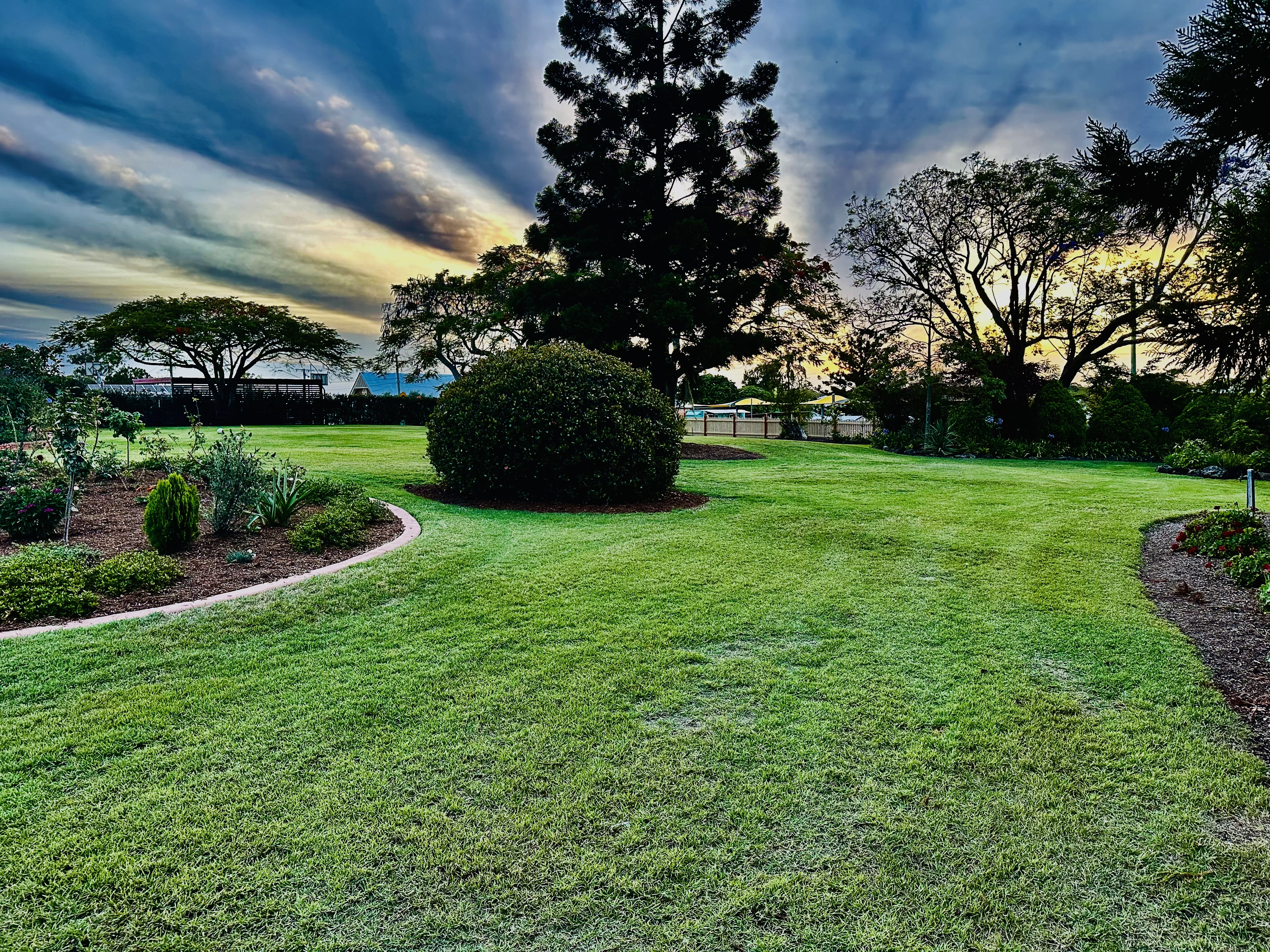
Spectacular sunsets from Booval House Gardens

Booval House is a two-storey brick building with a steeply pitched hipped roof clad in corrugated galvanised iron and with a separate skillion roof over the verandahs on three sides. All of the verandahs, both ground level and upper floor, were enclosed with louvres and fibro and aluminium cladding by the Sisters of Mercy. In 1997 when conservation commenced, except for some unusual, original tapered timber columns on the upper level and a few original hidden balusters, all of the original architectural detail had been removed.

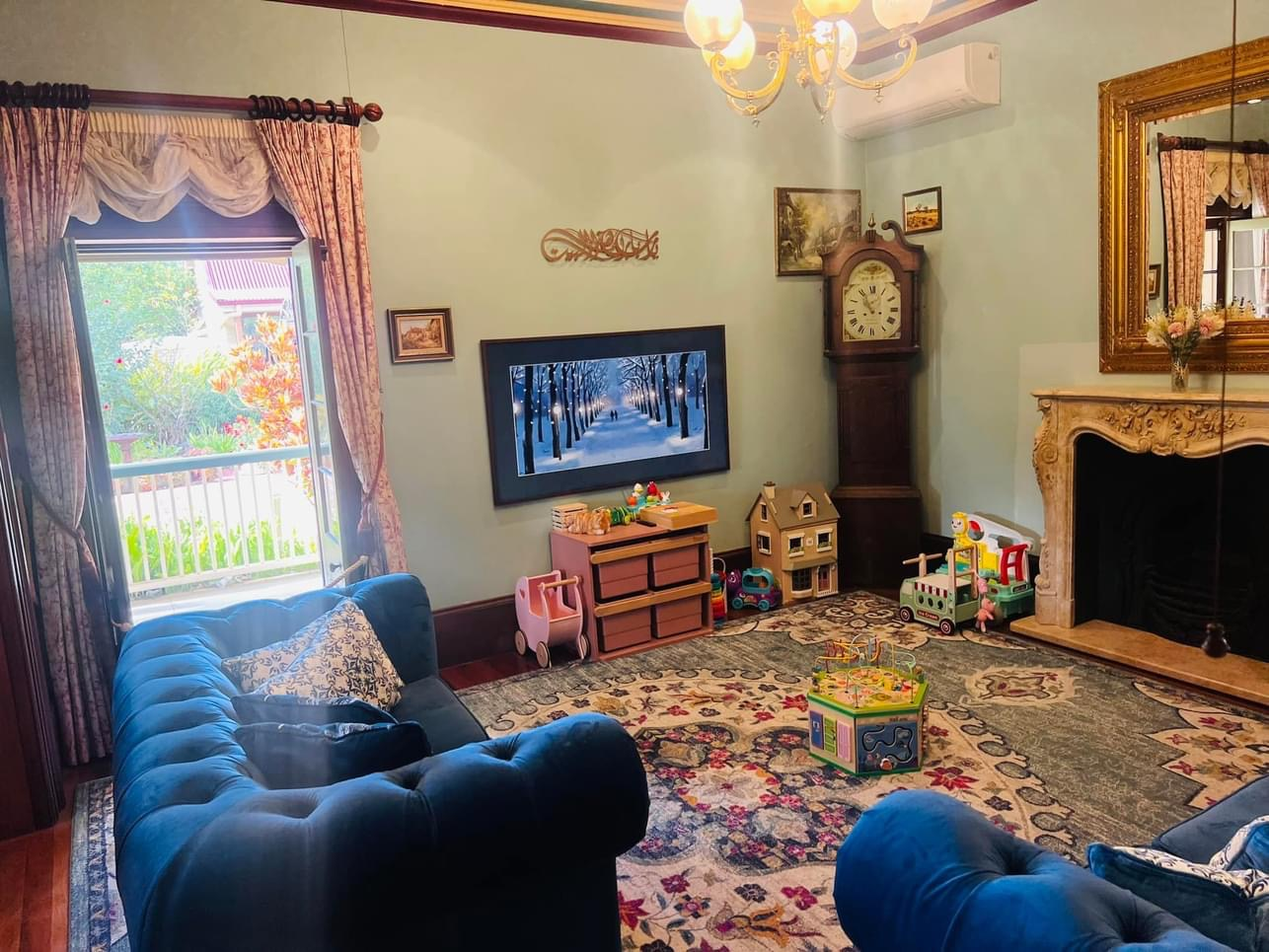
Space use over time changes with society

At ground floor level, the original main core of the house is made up of four rooms, a central hallway and a staircase. Large double bi-parting doors separate two of the main rooms ( original dining and drawing rooms). The hallway leads to an original lavatory box room and cellar. a doorway from the original dining room leads to the original detached kitchen wing and service entry, and subsequent 1896 attached kitchen and rear access. There are three fireplaces, one with marbled paintwork on timber. The chimneys for these fireplaces were closed up, with all cleaned and two reopened during the conservation.

Original skirtings, architraves, French doors and some cornices have survived and are of painted timber in simple design. All of the original ceilings in the ground floor rooms appear to have been replaced, some with vee-jointed tongue and groove boards and the drawing room with art-deco style fibrous plaster c. 1930. ( See note below re the upper floor ceilings) Where not covered by wall-to-wall vinyl and carpet, it is evident that some of the earlier Hoop Pine floors have been replaced with narrow-width hardwood and the drawing room floor was concreted! A substantial amount of the early glass in the doors and windows has been replaced with figured obscure "arctic" glass probably c. 1950.

During conservation work, the concrete was removed, the sub-floors were excavated ( to enable termite inspections) new 'galvanised stell stumps' were installed and the flooring renewed throughout the ground floor.

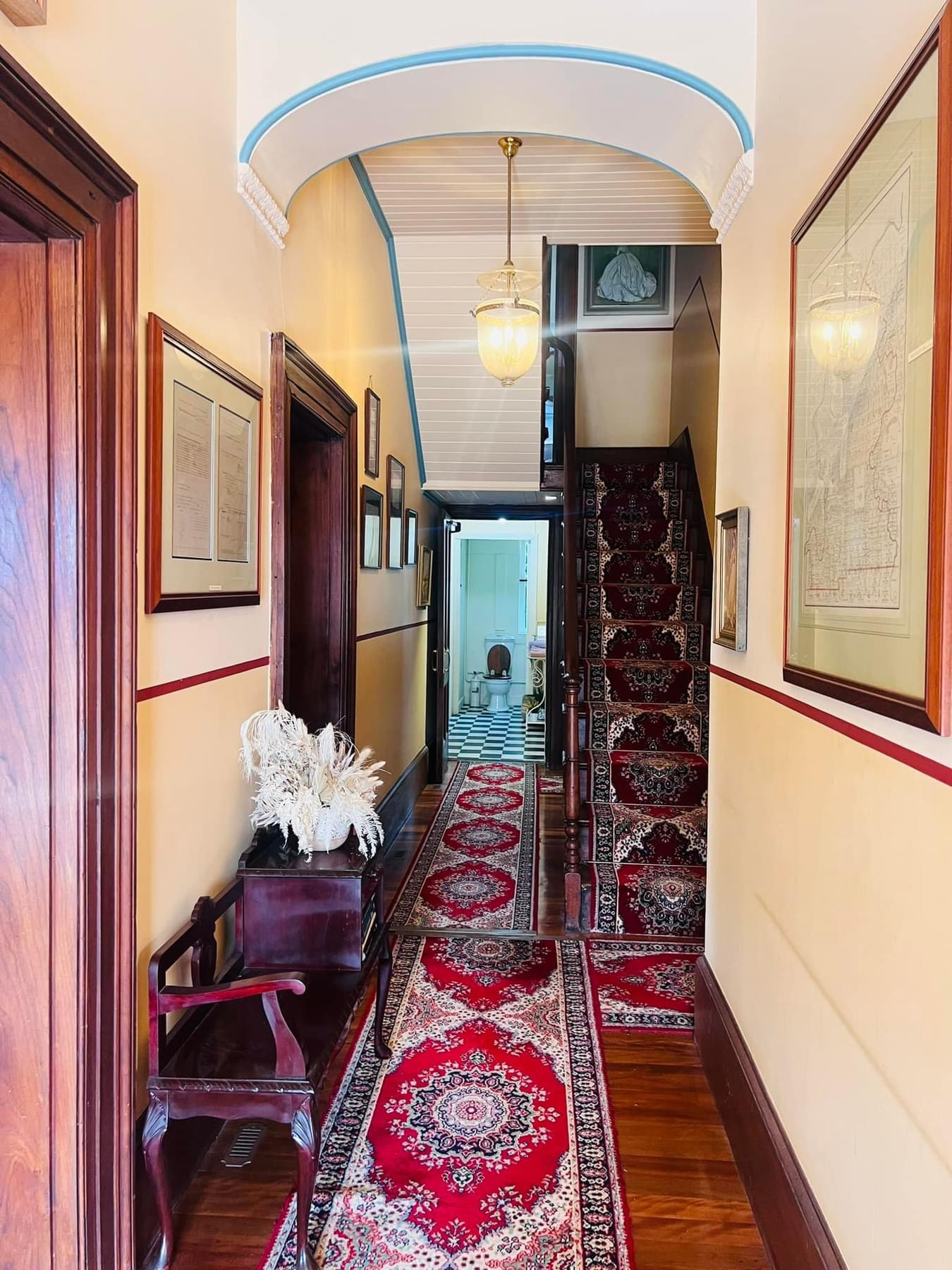
Keeping with original Georgian architecture narrow staircase and British colonial colours

The internal staircase is of simple design with a low height cedar handrail supported on square painted timber balusters and a turned cedar newel post. The stair is narrow and steep and contains a half landing.

There is an original rear wing constructed of brickwork on the mid southern side of the house. The original Box room flooring has been replaced by concrete ( further evidence of previous severe termite damage). There is evidence of original ceiling hooks, and the box room contains an access manhole and a ladder leading down to an underground cellar approximately 5 by 5 metres (16 by 16 ft) in size. The cellar has wall niches for storage and two metal ventilating ducts leading to the outside air. The original outside access had been bricked up by the convent, apparently to stop children going into the cellar (or the dungeon as they called it).

The kitchen wing was added in 1896 and is a single storey hipped-roof timber-frame structure with a large brick fireplace/range at the southern end. Apart from the fireplace, no early fitout survives in this 1896 kitchen or the scullery/laundry immediately to the south.

The upper level of the main house contains four main rooms generally consistent with the plan form beneath. There is also a room accessed directly from the half-landing of the stair, and is directly above the Box Room. All of these rooms were further subdivided by the convent, mainly to create more 'cells' for the Nuns, and this resulted in original timber being sawn to allow new walls or storage.

The upstairs rooms have TGVJ ceilings and three bedrooms contain cedar framed fireplaces (all of which were converted to storage by the convent . The original 1850s roof was shingles. Over time, the roof developed leaks and the original plaster and lathe ceilings became damaged and were replaced (at different times based on the TGVJ boards). There was not visible termite damage to the top floor ceilings, and only the drawing room ceiling appeared to have termite damage on the found floor. It is not known why the other ground floor ceilings were replaced, but presumably the plaster and lathe was too damaged to repair.

In similar fashion to the ground floor, all rooms have French doors opening to the convent-enclosed verandahs.

Throughout the house, the joinery has been painted and the plastered walls are either papered or painted. No early decoration is visible. Most rooms have fluorescent lighting. with electrical wiring laid across the ceilings

Verandahs at the lower level have been enclosed with facebrick walls and banks of louvre windows. At the upper level, the undersill has been clad with fibro and weatherboards and windows of obscure coloured glass extend full length above sill height. Some original (but badly damaged by later work for the convent) octagonal tapered timber posts remain visible from the inside and there is a triangular pediment placed centrally on the northern facade. The entrance at ground level is secured by means of a contemporary roller shutter door. Parts of the verandahs have been ceiled with ripple iron fixed to provide a fall to an outer gutter under the leading edge of the upper level verandah.

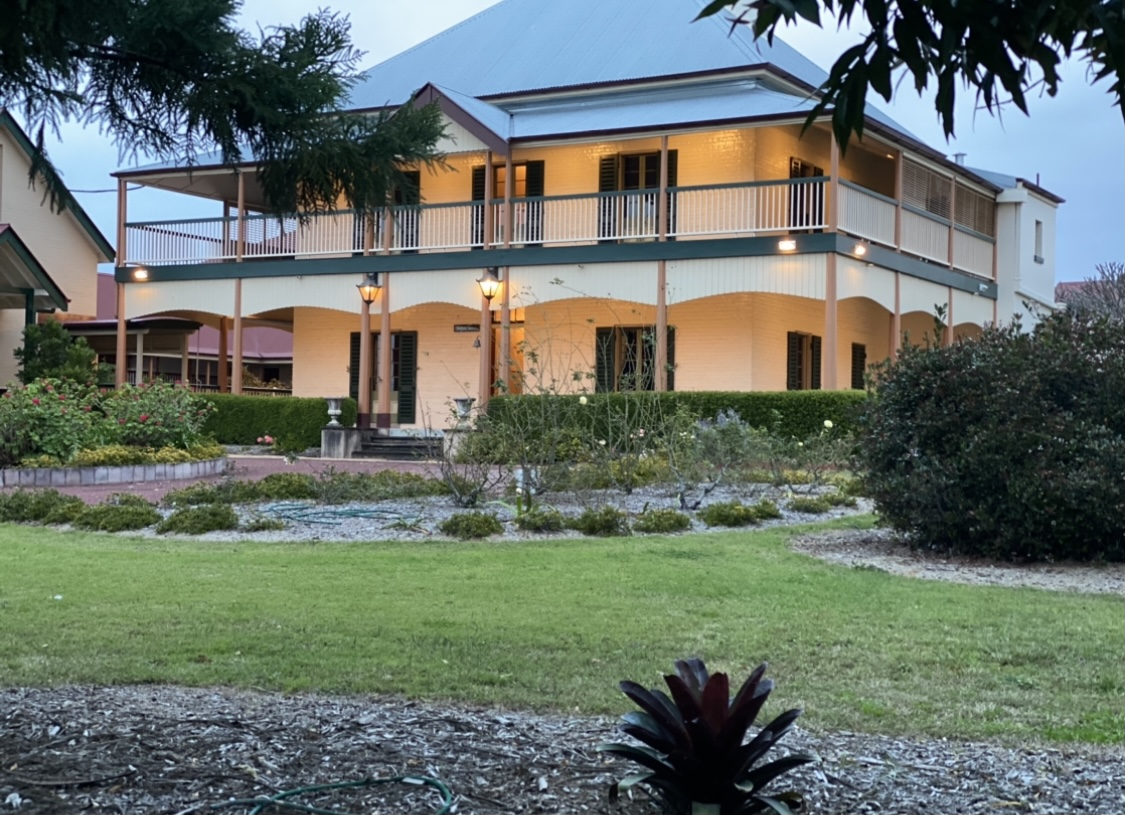
Returning to become a home once again

During conservation, the verandah balustrades and verandah posts ( from ground to top floor height) rebuilt, using the remnants as templates. All the verandah enclosures, ground and top floor, were removed. The French doors were rehung as original, opening internally, with replacement shutters installed externally. The convent erected external and rusting fire escape stairs were removed.

A substantial two-storey brick chapel has been constructed in 1969 to the east of the main building and is linked to the north-east verandahs at both upper and lower levels. The chapel wing has four upper bedrooms, a chapel and sanctuary and internal staircase. The roof has a 20* pitch, unlike the original house and later new outbuildings. All of the architectural features, form and materials are of 1960s origin.

Approved conservation work undertaken 2015/16 resulted in the removal of the top level walkway, such that the original house is now free-standing again. The roof line was altered and includes a 40* pitch, with a very functional verandah added to the northern side of the chapel. All asbestos was removed. The Chapel has been retained, and the top floor accommodation is now open plan ( because of the upper floor changes).

Outbuildings included a rudimentary shed and fernery to the southeast of the grounds and a modern carport on the south-western corner. During conservation, this old shed was removed and replaced with an approved garage and garden workroom wing, built quite compatible with the original house.

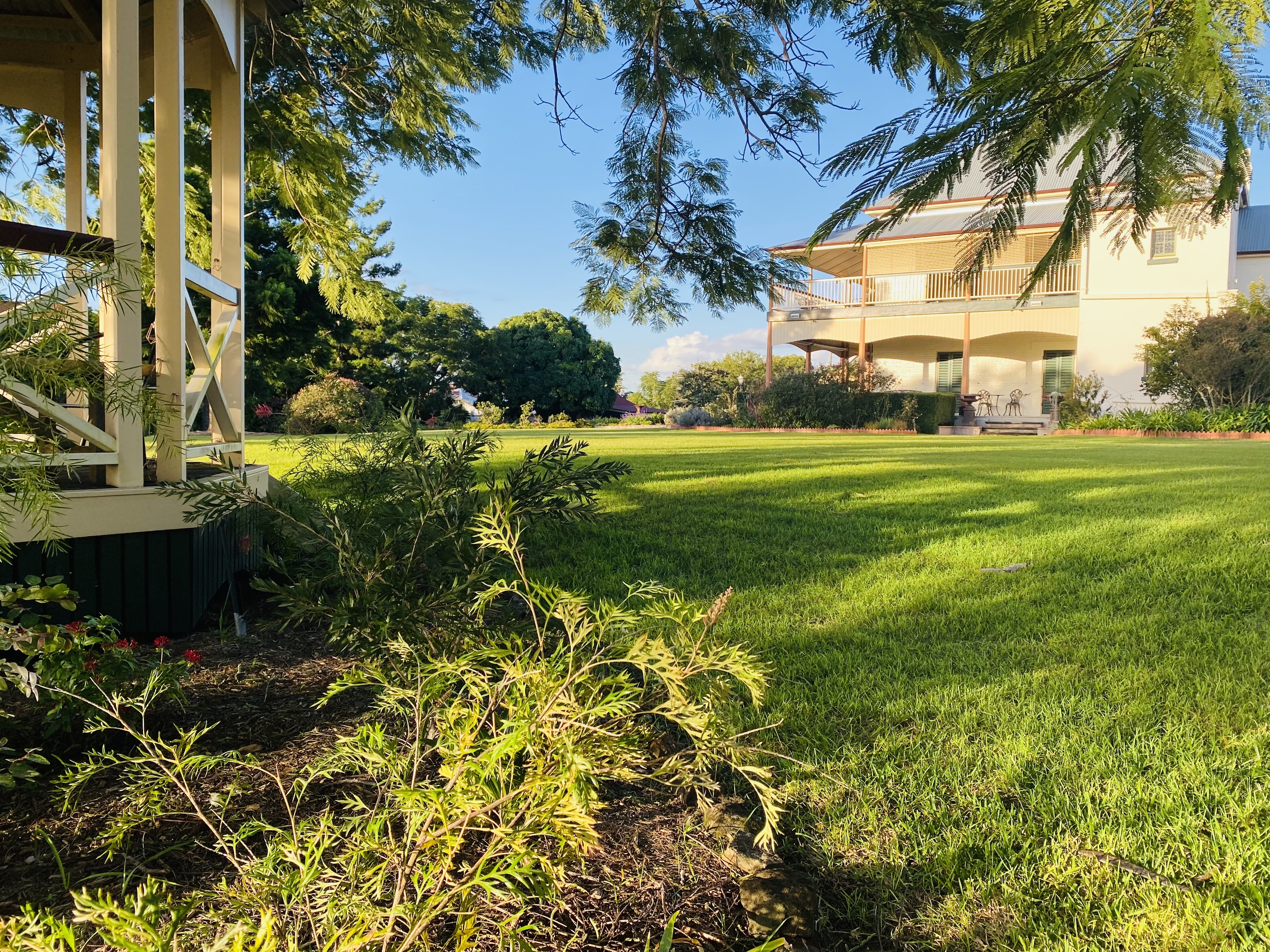
Shaded pergola to enjoy nature and tea

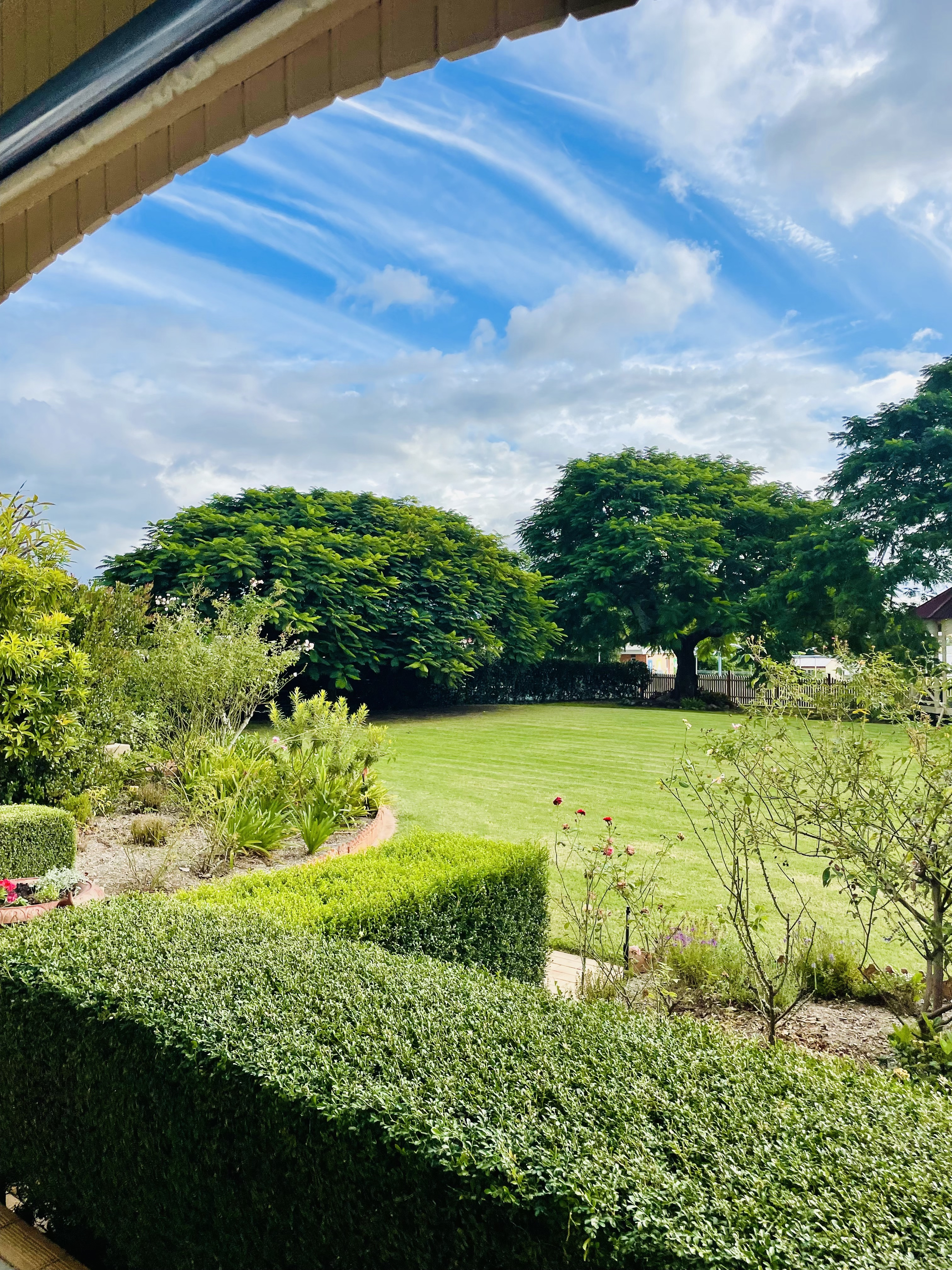
Lush gardens and lawns surround Booval House

The garden contains some major but all relatively recent trees, most notably cocos palms to the northern garden, mango trees forming a dense screen to the northern adjoining properties and some poinciana and jacaranda trees along the Cothill Road frontage. There was no evidence of any original gardens.

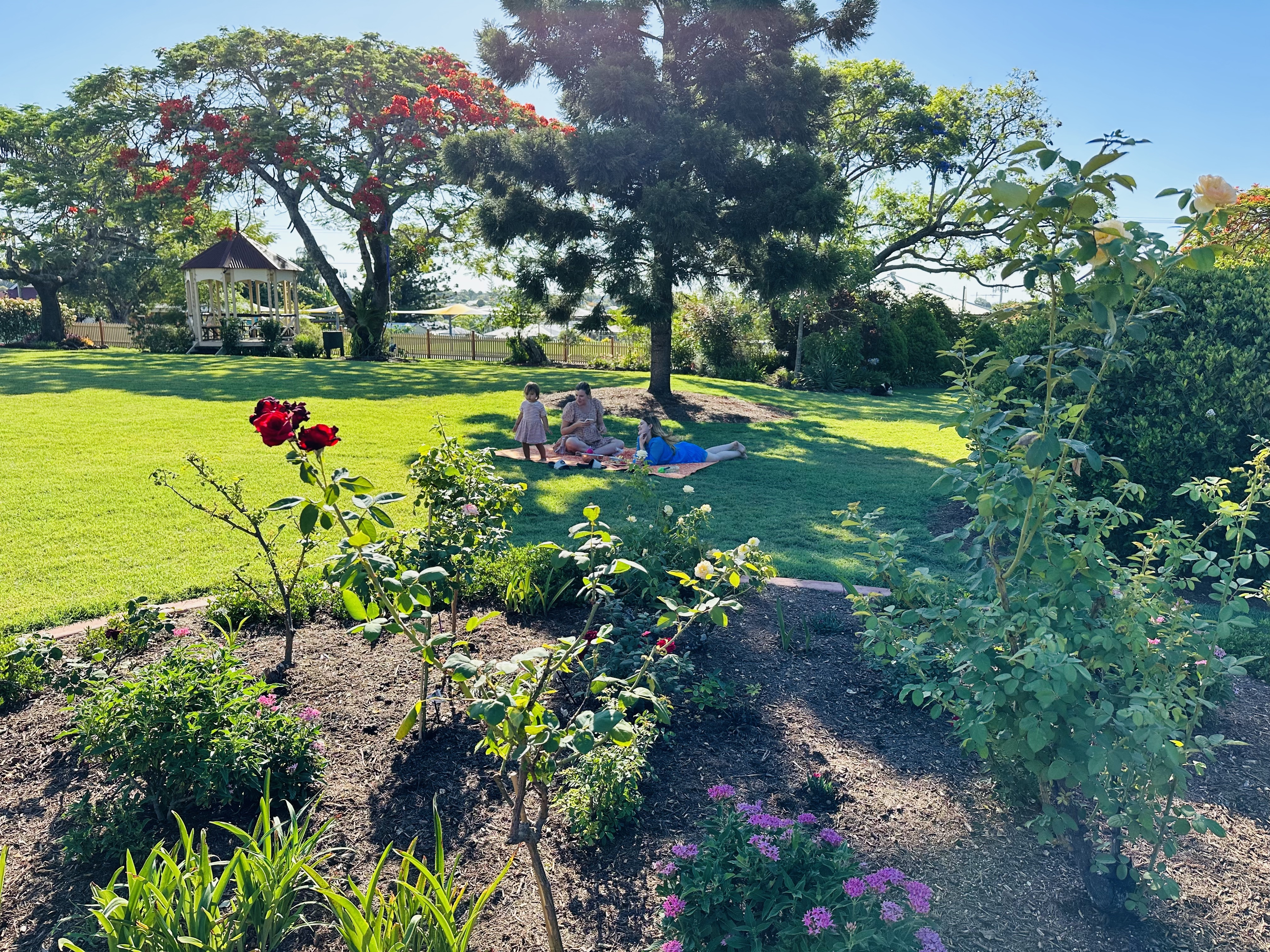
Throughout the year the garden transforms in colour and beauty

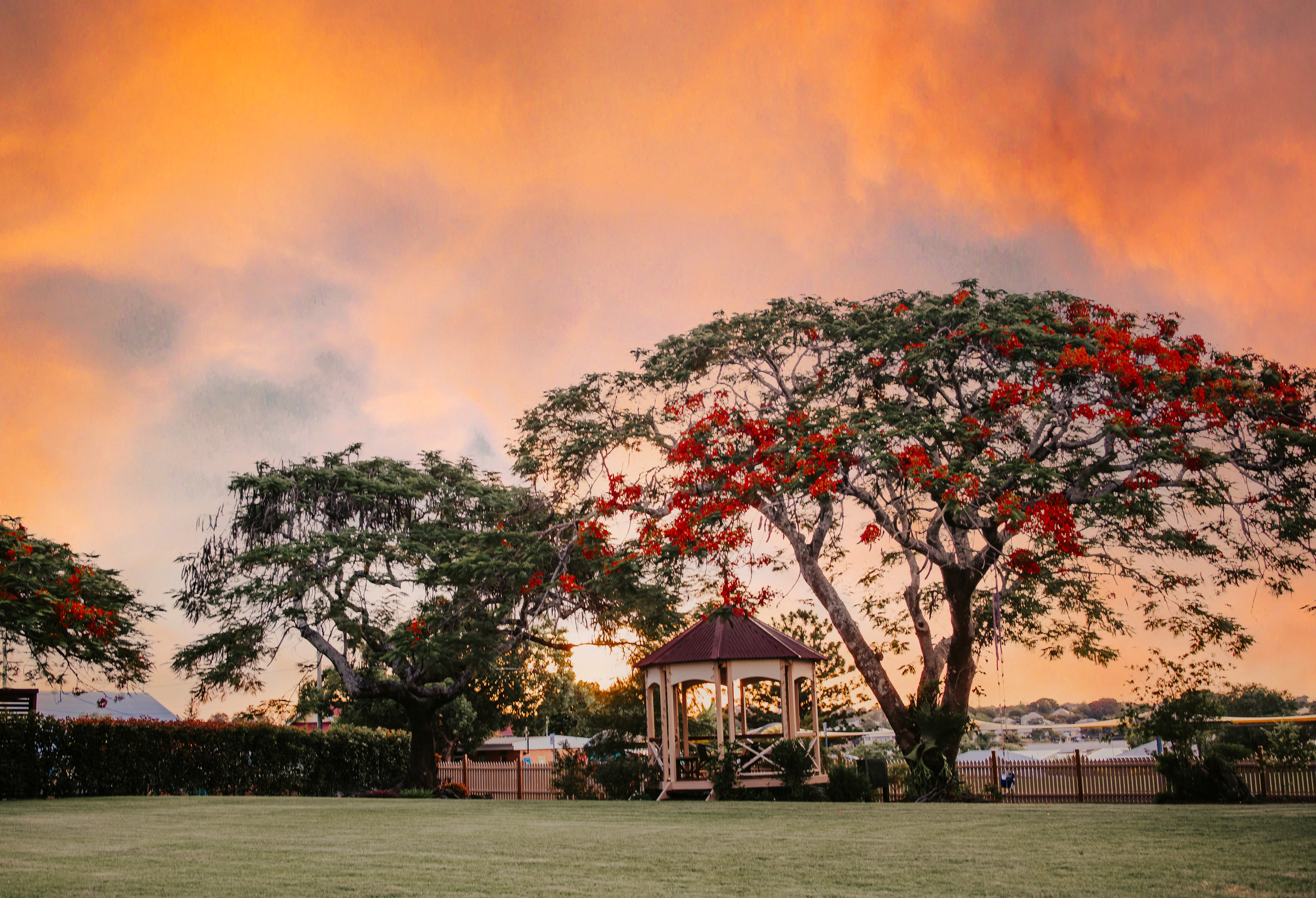
The sky and trees put on a colour show all year round

During conservation, and with Heritage Council approval, most of the Mango trees were removed- because of the significant public risk associated with the copious mango fruit falling onto public walking areas.

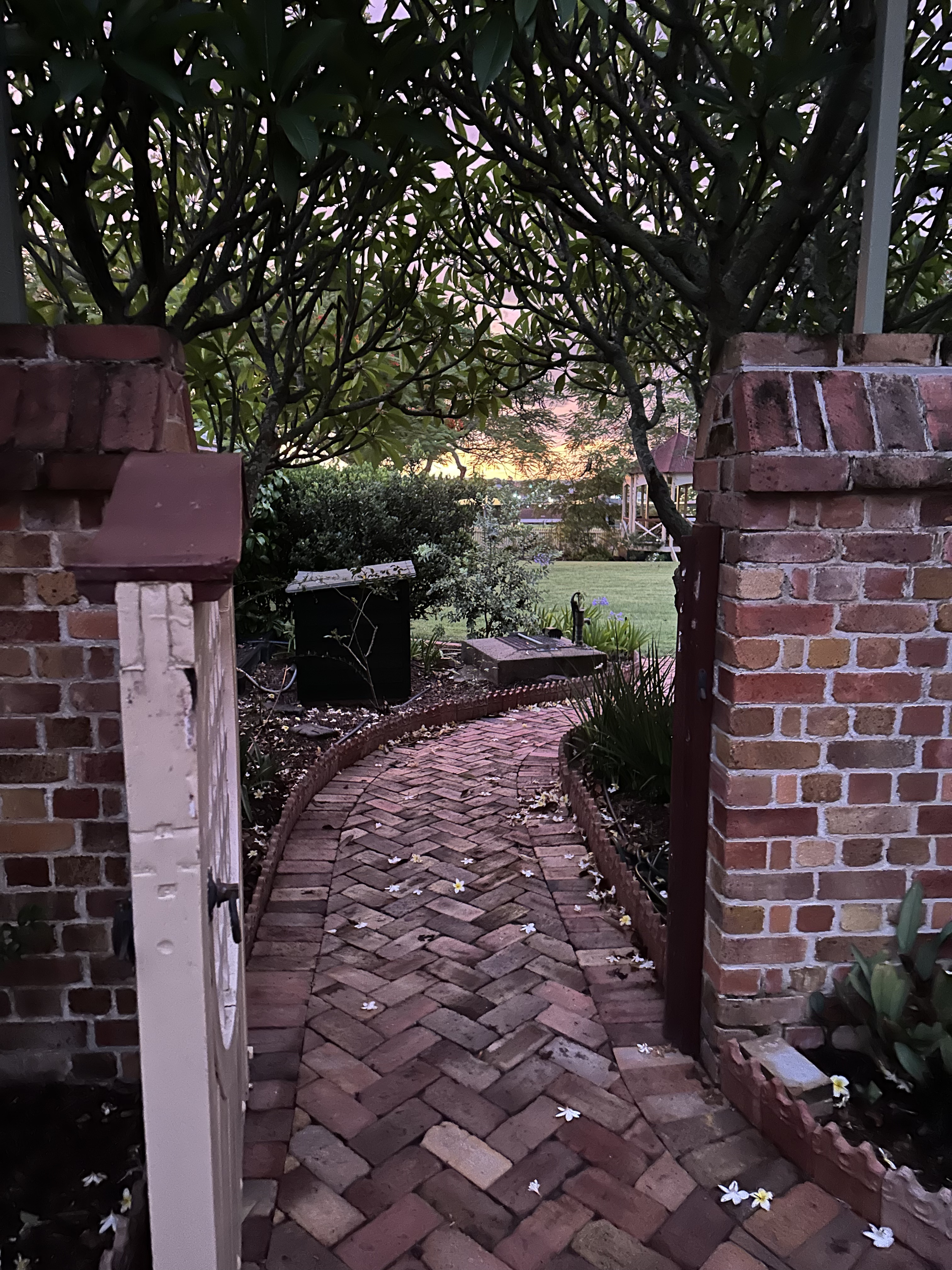
At the back of Booval House, a private garden is enclosed with a gate that previously serviced Government House.

The Cothill Road boundary fence line was partly a recent and poorly growing acalypha hedge with some remnant arrow head pickets. As part of the conservation, a new period gate was erected, and later the hedge replaced by a period picket fence. The weldmesh fence to the other frontage ( French Street) was likewise replaced with pickets.

== Heritage listing ==
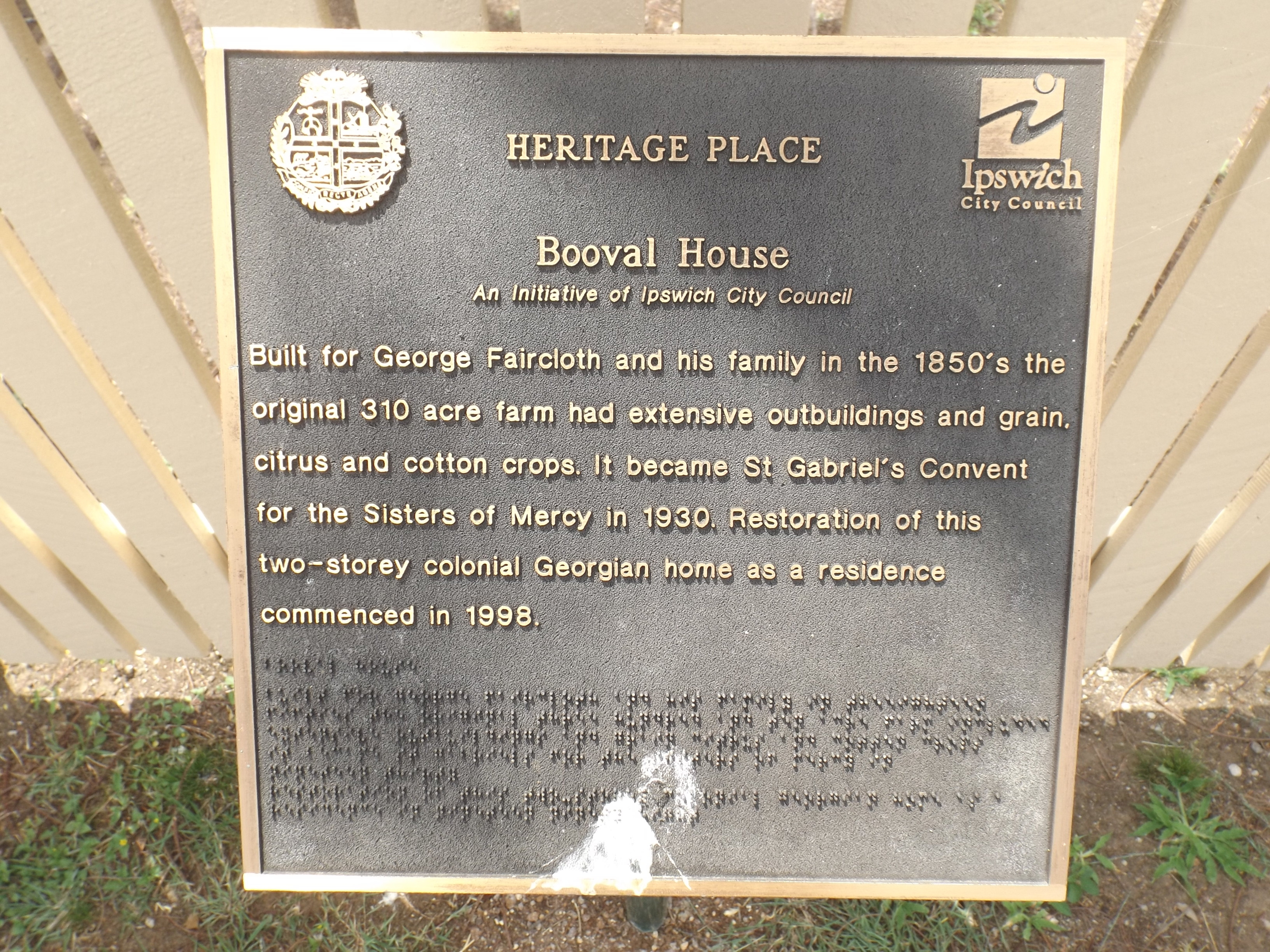
Ipswich City Council plaque, 2015

Booval House was listed on the Queensland Heritage Register on 21 August 1992 having satisfied the following criteria.

The place is important in demonstrating the evolution or pattern of Queensland's history.

It has a strong association with the early cotton-growing industry in Queensland in the 1860s; with two important early entrepreneurs George Faircloth and John Ferrett; and with the work of the Sisters of Mercy since 1930.

The place demonstrates rare, uncommon or endangered aspects of Queensland's cultural heritage.

Built between 1857 and 1859, Booval House is a rare surviving example of a substantial two-storeyed brick house of the 1850s.

The place is important in demonstrating the principal characteristics of a particular class of cultural places.

Built between 1857 and 1859, Booval House is a rare surviving example of a substantial two-storeyed brick house of the 1850s.

The place is important because of its aesthetic significance.

Although the exterior has been altered, its general form and massing and its surrounding garden exhibit aesthetic characteristics valued by the community.

The place has a special association with the life or work of a particular person, group or organisation of importance in Queensland's history.

It has a strong association with the early cotton-growing industry in Queensland in the 1860s; with two important early entrepreneurs George Faircloth and John Ferrett; and with the work of the Sisters of Mercy since 1930.

It is possibly associated with early architect William Wakeling.
