= Bundamba railway station =

Railway station in Queensland, Australia

Bundamba
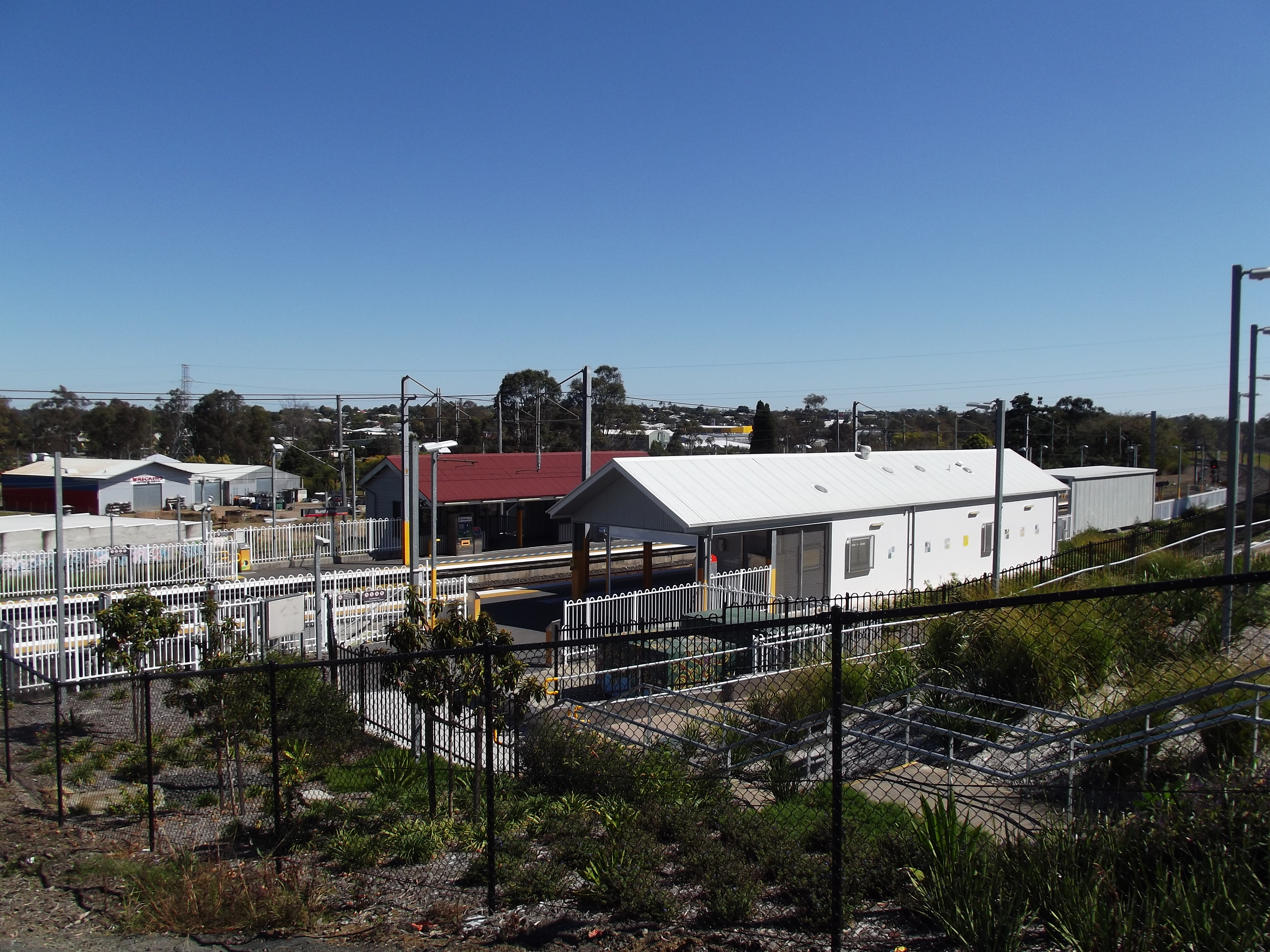
- Southbound view in September 2012

General information
- Location: Mining Street, Bundamba
- Coordinates: 27.6074°S 152.8048°E
- Owner: Queensland Rail
- Operator: Queensland Rail
- Line: T1 Ipswich/Rosewood
- Distance: 34.06 kilometres from Central
- Platforms: 2 side
- Tracks: 2

Construction
- Structure type: Ground
- Parking: 60 bays

Other information
- Station code: 600341 (platform 1); 600342 (platform 2)
- Fare zone: Zone 3
- Website: Queensland Rail

History
- Opened: 5 October 1874; 151 years ago
- Rebuilt: 21 October 2024

Services
Preceding station	Queensland Rail	Following station
Ebbw Vale towards Caboolture via Roma Street	T1 Ipswich/Rosewood line	Booval towards Ipswich or Rosewood
Location

Bundamba is a railway station operated by Queensland Rail on the Ipswich/Rosewood line. It opened in 1874 and serves the Ipswich suburb of Bundamba. It is a ground level station, featuring two side platforms.

== History ==
From 8 January 2024 until 21 October 2024, Bundamba station was temporarily closed for an accessibility upgrade, which includes a new footbridge with lift access, upgraded security cameras, and full-length, high-level platforms.

== Platforms and services ==
Bundamba is served by trains operating to and from Ipswich and Rosewood. Most city-bound services run to Caboolture and Nambour, with some morning peak trains terminating at Bowen Hills. Some afternoon inbound services on weekdays run to Kippa-Ring. Bundamba is seven minutes from Ipswich and 51 minutes on an all-stops train from Central.

Bundamba platform arrangement
Platform	Line	Destination	Notes
1	T1 Ipswich/Rosewood	Ipswich or Rosewood	
2	T1 Ipswich/Rosewood	Roma Street (to Caboolture and Nambour/Gympie North lines)	
