= Booval War Memorial =

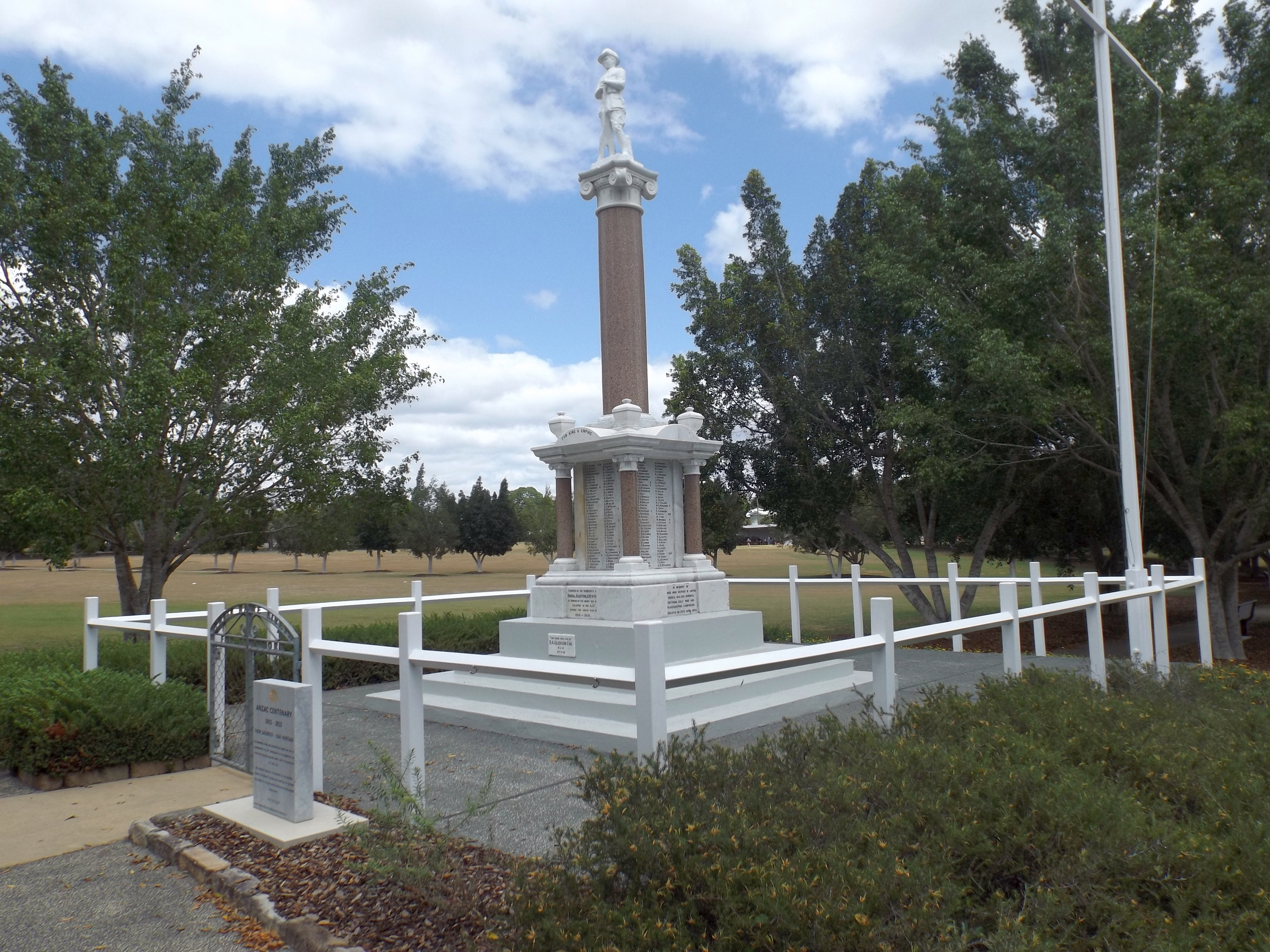
- Memorial in 2015

- Location within Queensland Location within Australia
- 27.6154°S 152.7848°E
- Location: Green Street, Booval, City of Ipswich, Queensland, Australia

History
- Design period: 1914–1919 (World War I)
- Built: 1919

Queensland Heritage Register
- Official name: Booval War Memorial
- Type: state heritage (built)
- Designated: 21 October 1992
- Reference no.: 600550
- Significant period: 1919– (social); 1919 (historical, fabric)
- Significant components: memorial – soldier statue, trees/plantings, park / green space, war trophy/ies, fence/wall – perimeter

Booval War Memorial is a heritage-listed memorial at Green Street, Booval, City of Ipswich, Queensland, Australia. It was built in 1919. It was added to the Queensland Heritage Register on 21 October 1992.

== History ==
The Booval War Memorial was unveiled on the 15 February 1919 by Queensland Governor, Sir Hamilton Goold-Adams. The marble and granite memorial was produced by Ipswich monumental masonry firm, F Williams and Company and honours the 221 local men who served during the First World War. Later plaques honour the 16 who died in the Second World War Plaques commemorating later conflicts have also been added.

In 1918, a committee was established to represent the Ipswich suburbs of Booval, Silkstone, Newtown and Raceview. Funds were raised by entertainments and public subscription to erect a war memorial, of which the foundations were laid by a voluntary "working bee". On 27 July 1918, the foundation stone was laid by David Gledson, Member of the Queensland Legislative Assembly for Ipswich. The total cost was £499.

The land was originally in the private ownership of Harold Foote and later subdivided. In 1914 it was resumed by the Bundamba Shire Council for the purpose of a park reserve and after the amalgamation of Councils it came under the jurisdiction of the Ipswich City Council.

Australia, and Queensland in particular, had few civic monuments before the First World War. The memorials erected in its wake became our first national monuments, recording the devastating impact of the war on a young nation. Australia lost 60,000 from a population of about 4 million, representing one in five of those who served. No previous or subsequent war has made such an impact on the nation.

Even before the end of the war, memorials became a spontaneous and highly visible expression of national grief. To those who erected them, they were as sacred as grave sites, substitute graves for the Australians whose bodies lay in battlefield cemeteries in Europe and the Middle East. British policy decreed that the Empire war dead were to be buried where they fell. The word "cenotaph", commonly applied to war memorials at the time, literally means "empty tomb".

Australian war memorials are distinctive in that they commemorate not only the dead. Australians were proud that their first great national army, unlike other belligerent armies, was composed entirely of volunteers, men worthy of honour whether or not they made the supreme sacrifice. Many memorials honour all who served from a locality, not just the dead, providing valuable evidence of community involvement in the war. Such evidence is not readily obtainable from military records, or from state or national listings, where names are categorised alphabetically or by military unit.

Australian war memorials are also valuable evidence of imperial and national loyalties, at the time, not seen as conflicting; the skills of local stonemasons, metalworkers and architects; and of popular taste. In Queensland, the soldier statue was the popular choice of memorial, whereas the obelisk predominated in the southern states, possibly a reflection of Queensland's larger working-class population and a lesser involvement of architects.

Many of the First World War monuments have been updated to record local involvement in later conflicts, and some have fallen victim to unsympathetic re-location and repair.

Although there are many different types of memorials in Queensland, the digger statue is the most common. It was the most popular choice of communities responsible for erecting the memorials, embodying the ANZAC Spirit and representing the qualities of the ideal Australian: loyalty, courage, youth, innocence and masculinity. The digger was a phenomenon peculiar to Queensland, perhaps due to the fact that other states had followed Britain's lead and established Advisory Boards made up of architects and artists, prior to the erection of war memorials. The digger statue was not highly regarded by artists and architects who were involved in the design of relatively few Queensland memorials.

Most statues were constructed by local masonry firms, although some were by artists or imported.

The Booval memorial was designed and executed by the well known and highly regarded Ipswich monumental masonry firm F Williams and Company. Frank William's reputation prompted Daphne Mayo to work as an apprentice to him to learn the art of carving. She did this while waiting to begin a travelling scholarship which had been postponed due to the outbreak of the First World War.

Daphne Mayo is one of Australia's best known sculptors, responsible for many significant works such as the pedimental relief on Brisbane City Hall, the friezes and capitals on the Brisbane Tattersalls Club and the bronze doors for the State Library of New South Wales. She was born in England in 1895 and came to Brisbane in her childhood.

The statue on the Booval War Memorial is attributed to Mayo as the memorial was constructed during this time and bears a strong resemblance to a model made by her. The statue is of a style repeatedly used by Williams.

== Description ==
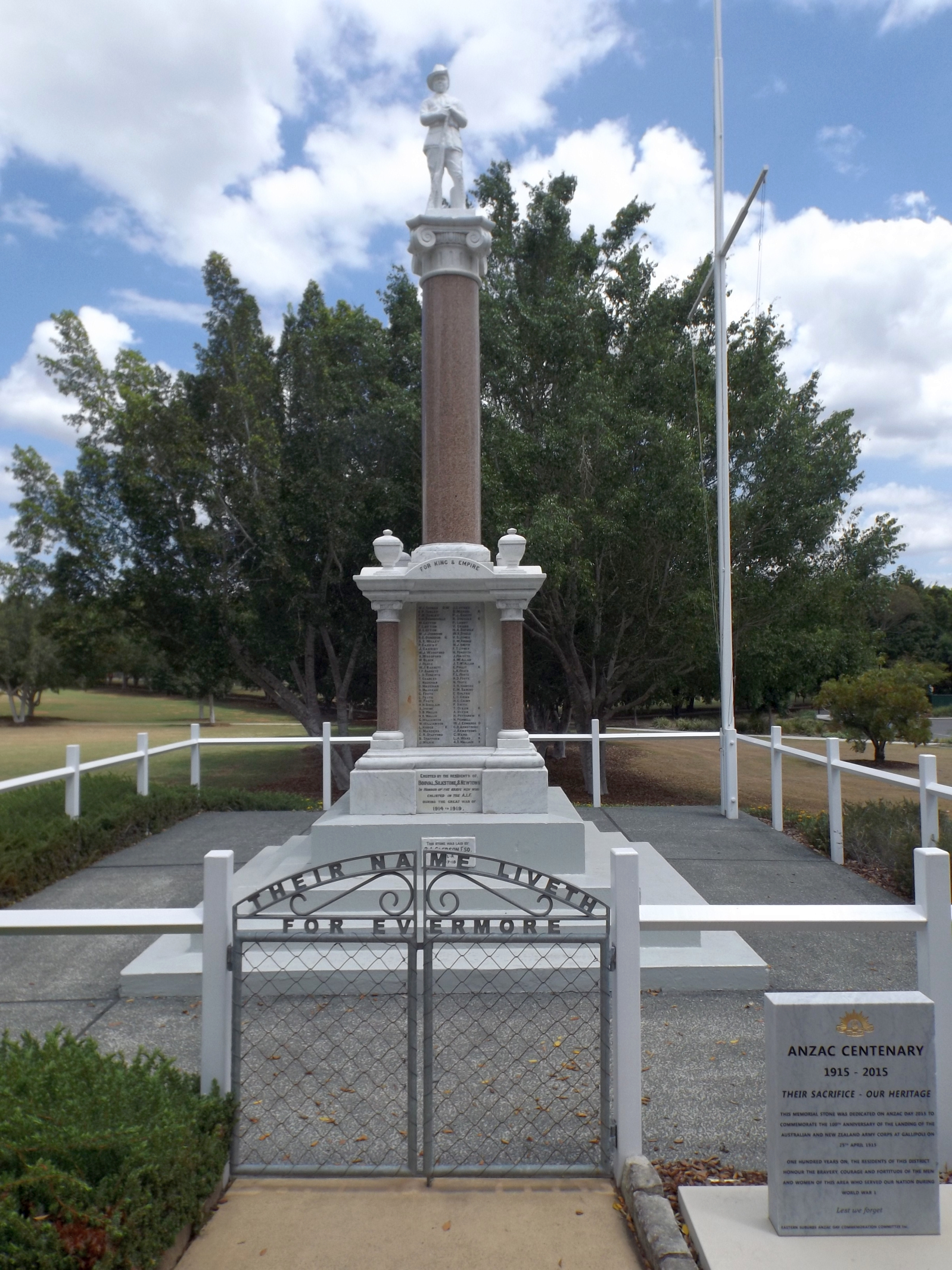
Memorial in 2015

The First World War Memorial is situated in a park in Booval facing Green Street. The park is surrounded by a low fence consisting of white painted timber posts linked by a metal chain. Hill's figs (Ficus microcarpa var. Hilli) line the boundary of the park. New landscaping is currently under construction and comprises a pathway and planting, symmetrically laid out with the memorial as the focal point. The original fence surrounding the memorial has been removed.

Access to the park is through a new timber pergola. This is flanked by two large fig trees which align with two more fig trees at the rear of the park. A new pathway leads from the centre of the pergola to the memorial with a gun or "war trophy" centrally located between the two. The pathway forms a square around the memorial and rejoins at the rear to continue to a rockery and seating. At the rockery, the path branches out diagonally, leading to an exit in one direction and a children's play area in the other. Newly planted trees line the pathway and a flagpole is located on the north side of the memorial.

The memorial stands 22 feet (6.7 m) from the ground and comprises a pedestal and column surmounted by a digger statue.

The granite and marble memorial sits on a stepped base of Melbourne bluestone which is painted. Surmounting the base is the pedestal, sitting on a marble plinth capped with torus and cyma recta moulding. The central portion of the pedestal is recessed on all faces and bears the leaded names of the 221 local citizens who served in the First World War and the 16 who died in the Second World War. Also projecting from the plinth at the four corners are free standing columns of red granite with Ionic order bases and capitals. These support a large cornice surmounted by marble urns at each corner with a simple curved pediment between.

Above the cornice is a column of red granite with an Ionic capital of marble. This is surmounted by a marble digger statue, smaller than life-sized standing at ease with arms reversed and supported by a tree stump. He stands with his feet slightly apart and the rifle rests beside one foot and is held across his body.

== Heritage listing ==
Booval War Memorial was listed on the Queensland Heritage Register on 21 October 1992 having satisfied the following criteria.

The place is important in demonstrating the evolution or pattern of Queensland's history.

War Memorials are important in demonstrating the pattern of Queensland's history as they are representative of a recurrent theme that involved most communities throughout the state. They provide evidence of an era of widespread Australian patriotism and nationalism, particularly during and following the First World War.

The place is important in demonstrating the principal characteristics of a particular class of cultural places.

The monuments document the period and reflect popular taste in the interwar years..

Unveiled in 1919, the memorial at Booval demonstrates the principal characteristics of a commemorative structure erected as a record of a major historical event. This is achieved through its materials and design elements. As a digger statue it is representative of the most popular form of memorial in Queensland

The place is important because of its aesthetic significance.

The memorial is of aesthetic significance both as a landmark and for its high level of workmanship, design and materials.

The place has a strong or special association with a particular community or cultural group for social, cultural or spiritual reasons.

It has a strong association with the community as evidence of the impact of a major historic event.

The place has a special association with the life or work of a particular person, group or organisation of importance in Queensland's history.

It also has special associations with monumental masonry firm F Williams and Company and Australia's best known female sculptor of the 1930s, Daphne Mayo.
