= North Tivoli, Queensland =

North Tivoli Ipswich, Queensland
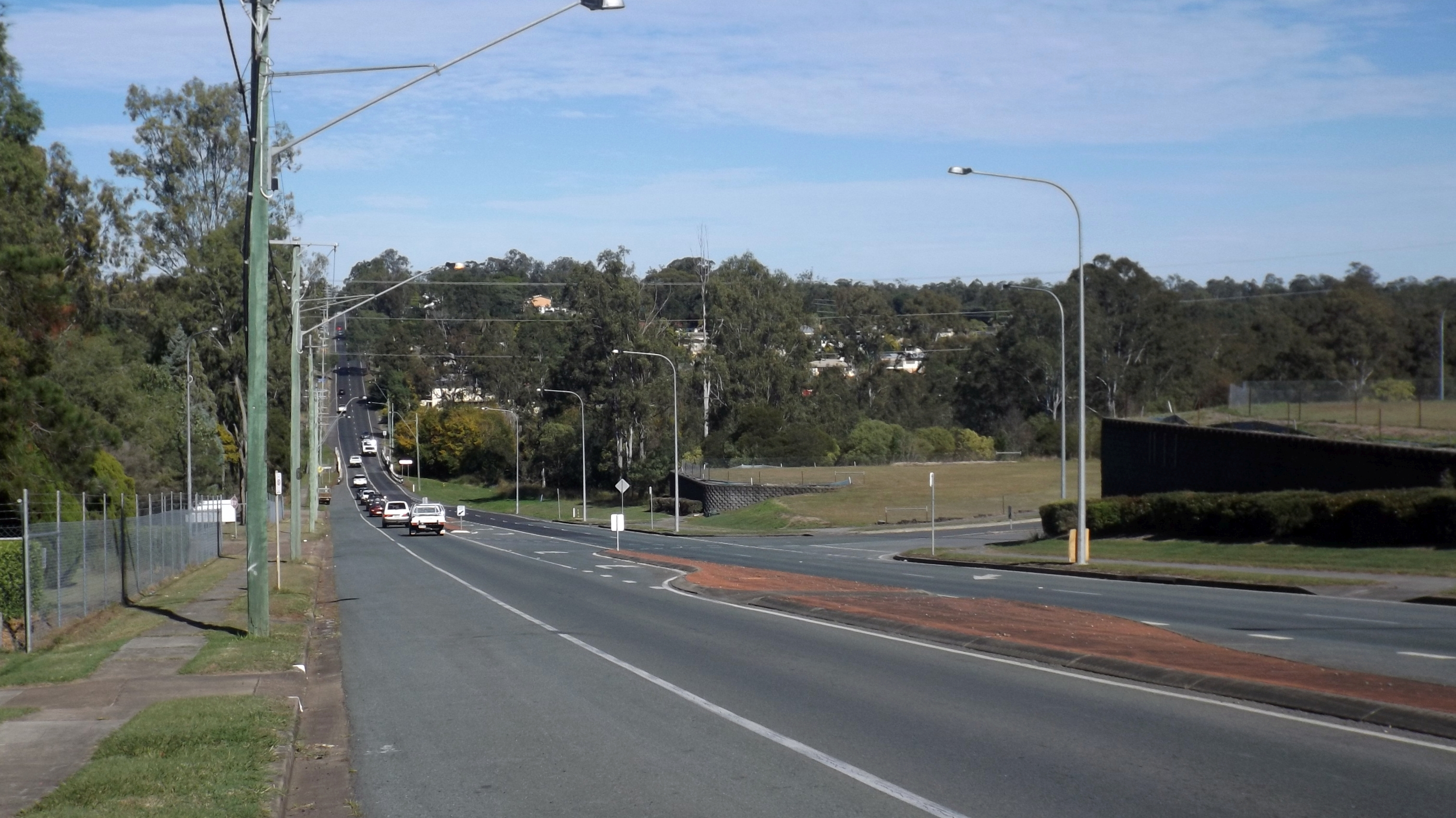
- Mount Crosby Road, 2015

- Coordinates: 27.5800°S 152.7888°E
- Population: 84 (2021 census)
  - Density: 46.7/km^{2} (121/sq mi)
- Postcode(s): 4305
- Area: 1.8 km^{2} (0.7 sq mi)
- Time zone: AEST (UTC+10:00)
- Location: 5.6 km (3 mi) NNE of Ipswich; 39 km (24 mi) SW of Brisbane
- LGA(s): City of Ipswich
- State electorate(s): Ipswich West
- Federal division(s): Blair
Suburbs around North Tivoli:
Chuwar	Chuwar	Karalee
Tivoli	North Tivoli	Karalee
Tivoli	North Booval	Bundamba

North Tivoli is a suburb of Ipswich in the City of Ipswich, Queensland, Australia. In the 2021 census, North Tivoli had a population of 84 people.

== Geography ==
The northern boundary of North Tivoli follows the Warrego Highway. Mount Crosby Road runs through from west to north.

The Bremer River marks the southern border. Most of the suburb is used for industrial purposes; the eastern half of the suburb is occupied by a single business, producing blended landscaping soils and compost.

== Demographics ==
In the 2016 census, North Tivoli had a population of 96 people.

In the 2021 census, North Tivoli had a population of 84 people.

== Education ==
There are no schools in North Tivoli. The nearest primary school is Tivoli State School in Tivoli. The nearest secondary school is Ipswich State High School in Brassall.
