= Booval railway station =

Railway station in Queensland, Australia

Booval
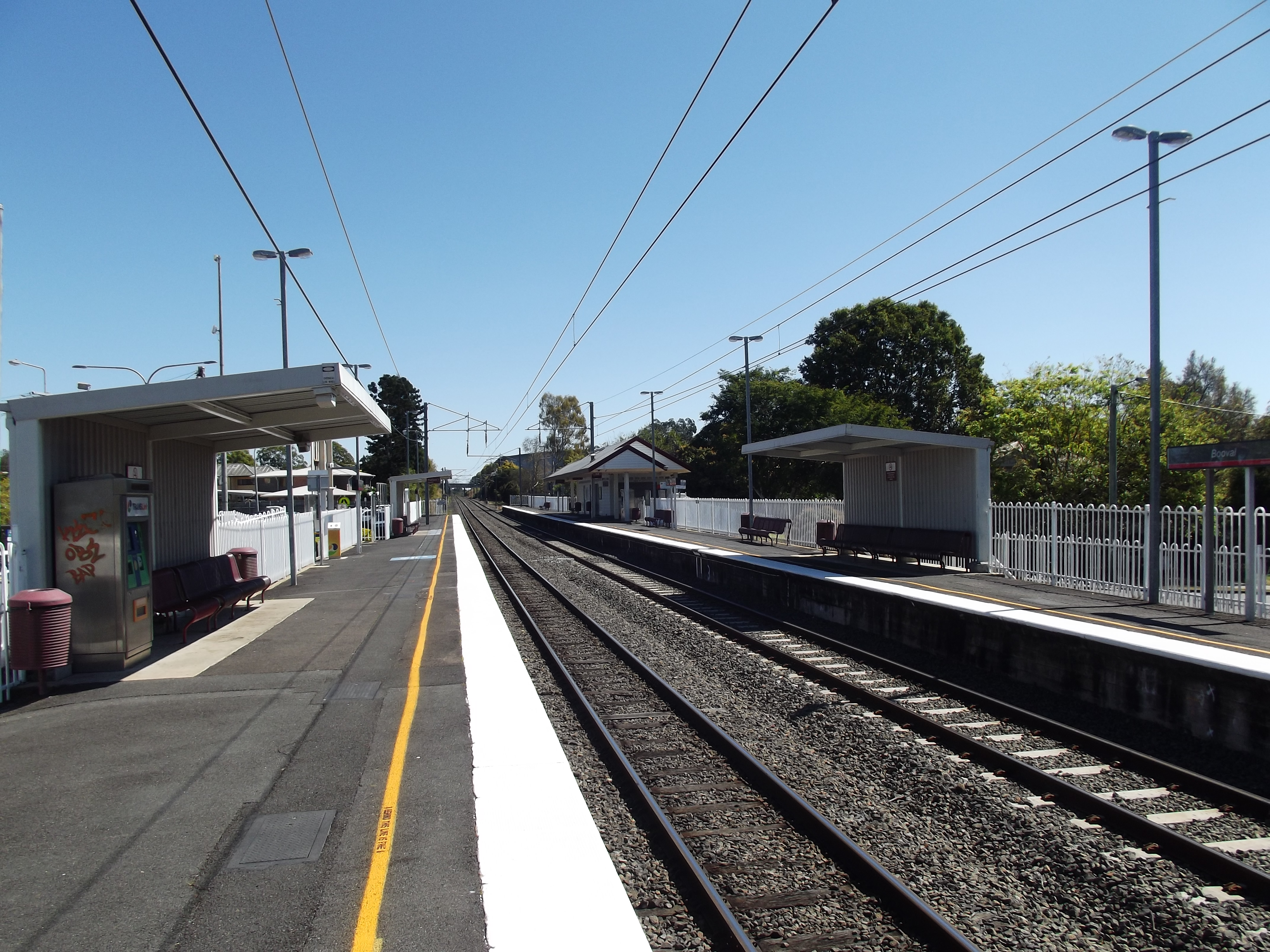
- Westbound view from Platform 1 in September 2012

General information
- Location: South Station Road, Booval
- Coordinates: 27.6093°S 152.7894°E
- Owner: Queensland Rail
- Operator: Queensland Rail
- Line: T1 Ipswich/Rosewood
- Distance: 35.52 kilometres from Central
- Platforms: 2 side
- Tracks: 2

Construction
- Structure type: Ground
- Parking: 205 bays

Other information
- Station code: 600343 (platform 1); 600344 (platform 2)
- Fare zone: Zone 3
- Website: Queensland Rail

History
- Opened: 1876; 150 years ago
- Rebuilt: 1993; 33 years ago

Services
Preceding station	Queensland Rail	Following station
Bundamba towards Caboolture via Roma Street	T1 Ipswich/Rosewood line	East Ipswich towards Ipswich or Rosewood
Location

Booval is a railway station operated by Queensland Rail on the Ipswich/Rosewood line. It opened in 1876 and serves the Ipswich suburb of Bundamba. It is a ground level station, featuring two side platforms.

== Platforms and services ==
Booval is served by trains operating to and from Ipswich and Rosewood. Most city-bound services run to Caboolture and Nambour, with some morning peak trains terminating at Bowen Hills. Some afternoon inbound services on weekdays run to Kippa-Ring. Booval is five minutes from Ipswich and 53 minutes on an all-stops train from Central.

Booval platform arrangement
Platform	Line	Destination	Notes
1	T1 Ipswich/Rosewood	Ipswich or Rosewood	
2	T1 Ipswich/Rosewood	Roma Street (to Caboolture and Nambour/Gympie North lines)	

== Transport links ==
Westside Bus Company operate two bus routes via Booval station:

- 503: Bundamba to Riverlink Shopping Centre
- 514: Booval to Moores Pocket
