= Bundamba State Secondary College =

Location
- South East Queensland; Bundamba, Queensland; Australia; 27°36′52.88″S 152°48′47.26″E

Information
- Former name: Bundamba State High School
- Type: Public secondary school
- Motto: Success With Honour
- Established: 1970; 56 years ago
- Principal: Sandra Quinn
- Grades: 7–12
- Gender: Both
- Enrolment: 879 (2023)
- Hours in school day: 6
- Website: www.bundambassc.eq.edu.au

Bundamba State Secondary College is a public, co-educational, high school, located in the Ipswich suburb of Bundamba, in Queensland, Australia. It is administered by the Department of Education, with an enrolment of 879 students and a teaching staff of 82, as of 2023. The school serves students from Year 7 to Year 12.

== History ==
The school opened on 27 January 1970, under the name Bundamba State High School (BSHS) and adopted its present name on 1 January 2003.

A new library was constructed for the school in 1976, and during 1988, "a multiuser microcomputer system" was trialed at the school.

In November 2017, a significant marking error at the school was identified by the principal, which downgraded many students' papers, with the Department of Education admitting that it could affect some students being able to attend university.

== Notable alumni ==
- Rhan Hooper, Australian Rules Football player.
- Shayne Neumann, member of the Australian Parliament for Blair.

== See also ==
- List of schools in Queensland
