= Bundamba, Queensland =

Bundamba Ipswich, Queensland
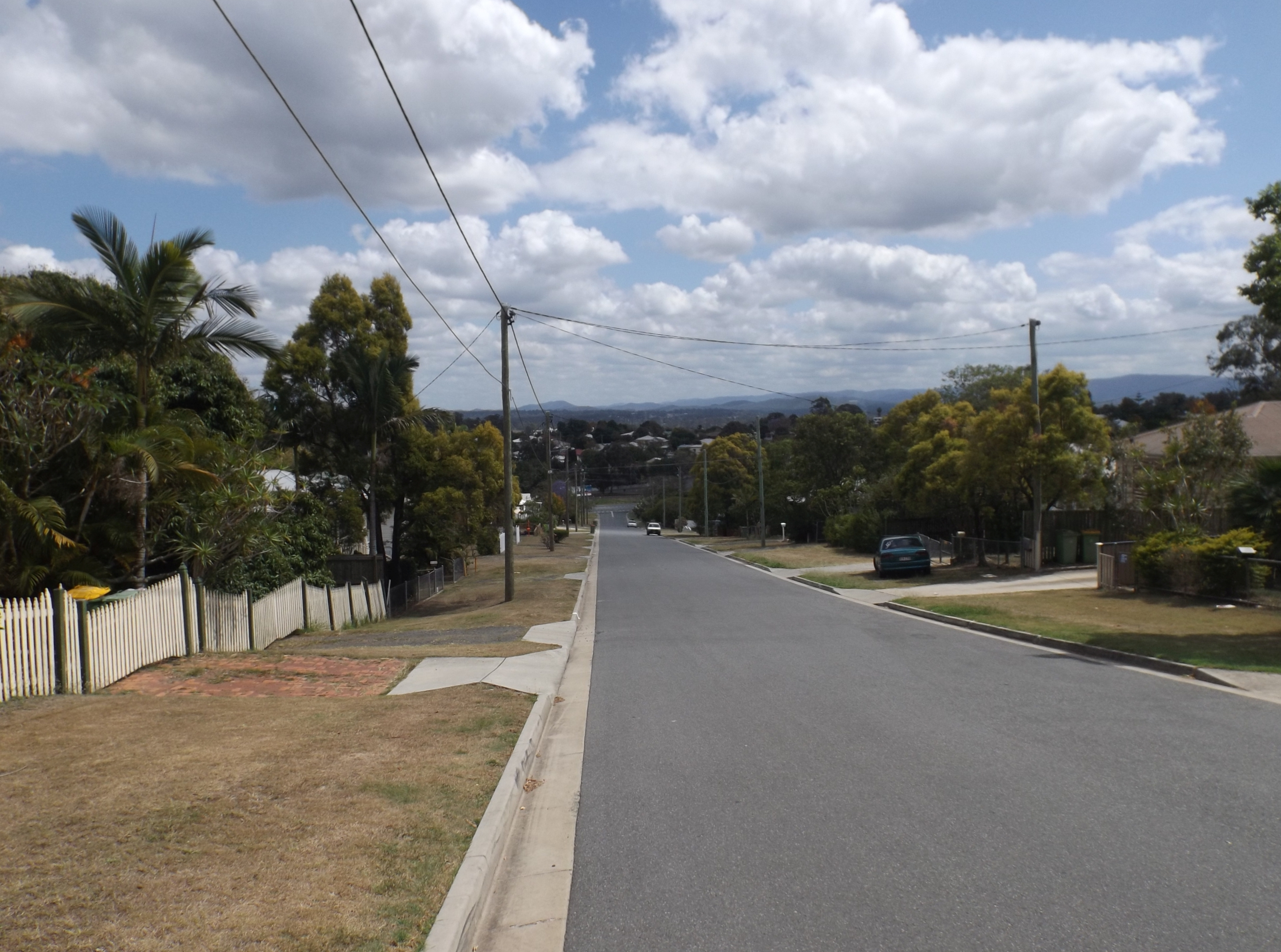
- Harold Street, 2015

- Coordinates: 27.6044°S 152.8091°E
- Population: 6,542 (2021 census)
  - Density: 594.7/km^{2} (1,540/sq mi)
- Postcode(s): 4304
- Area: 11.0 km^{2} (4.2 sq mi)
- Time zone: AEST (UTC+10:00)
- Location: 6.3 km (4 mi) ENE of Ipswich CBD; 35.1 km (22 mi) SW of Brisbane CBD
- LGA(s): City of Ipswich
- State electorate(s): Bundamba; Ipswich
- Federal division(s): Blair
Suburbs around Bundamba:
North Tivoli	Karalee	Riverview
North Booval; Booval	Bundamba	Dinmore; Ebbw Vale
Silkstone	Blackstone	New Chum

Bundamba is a suburb of Ipswich in the City of Ipswich, Queensland, Australia. In the 2021 census, Bundamba had a population of 6,542 people.

== Geography ==
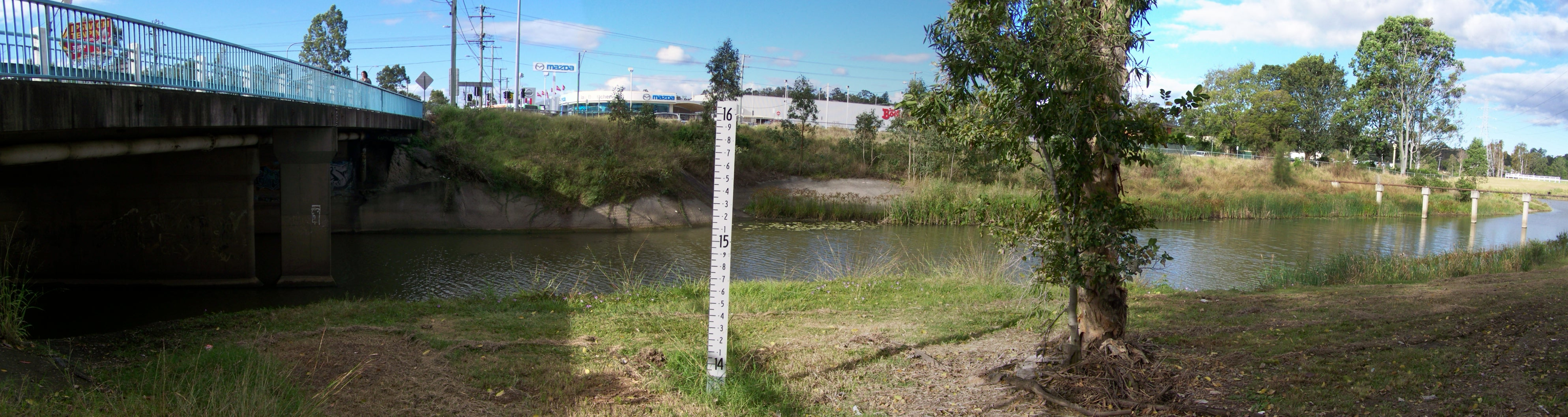
Bundamba Creek

The Bremer River forms the western part of the suburb's northern boundary. The Warrego Highway enters the suburb at its north-eastern corner (Riverview) and then forms the eastern part of the suburb's northern boundary before crossing the river to the north (Karalee). The suburb is mostly bounded to west by Bundamba Creek, which becomes a tributary of the Bremer River at the suburb's north-western corner (27.5856°S 152.7897°E).

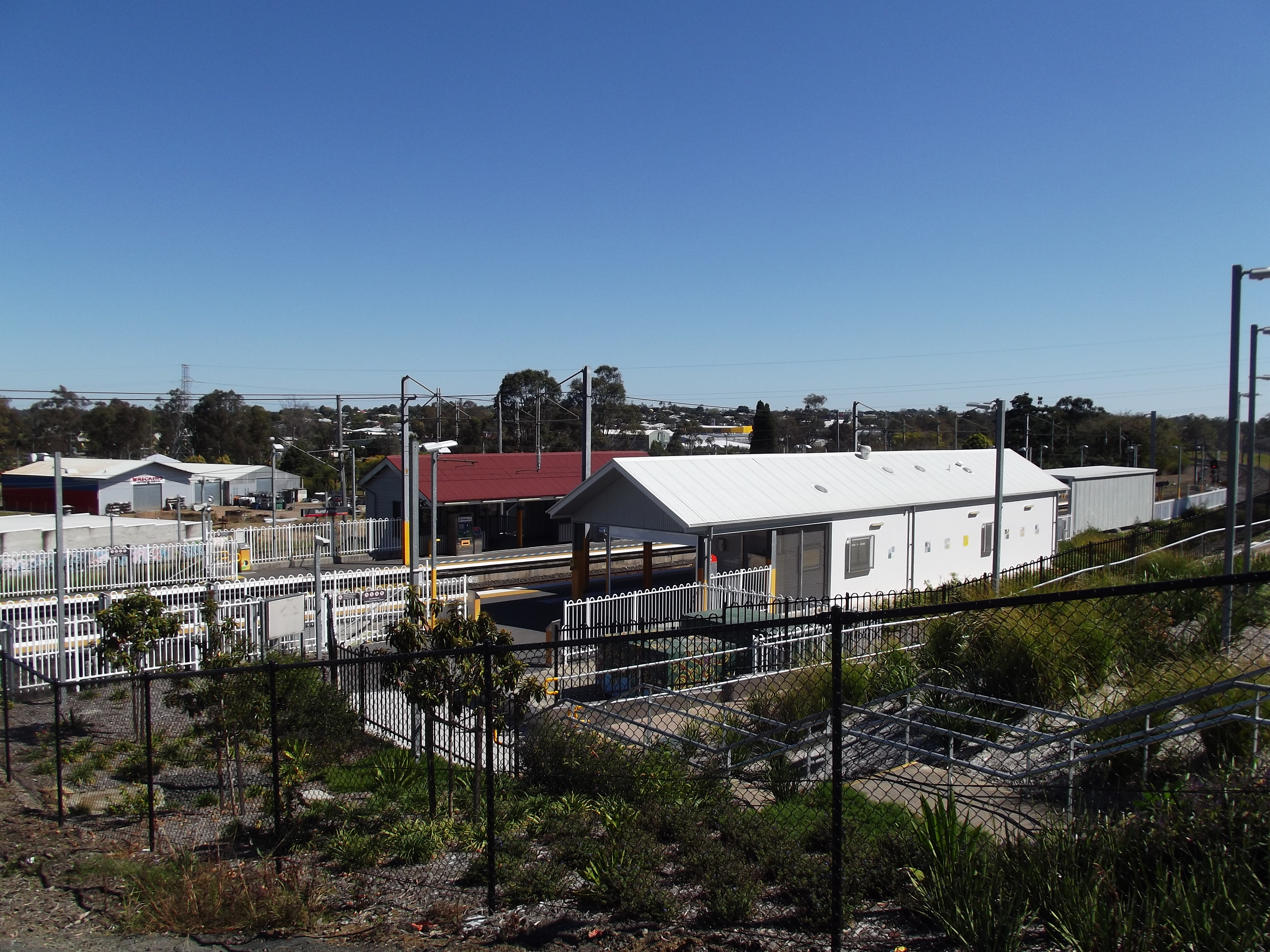
Bundabamba railway station, 2012

Ipswich Racecourse (formerly known as Bundamba Racecourse) is in the south-west of the suburb at 219 Brisbane Road (27.6158°S 152.8046°E).

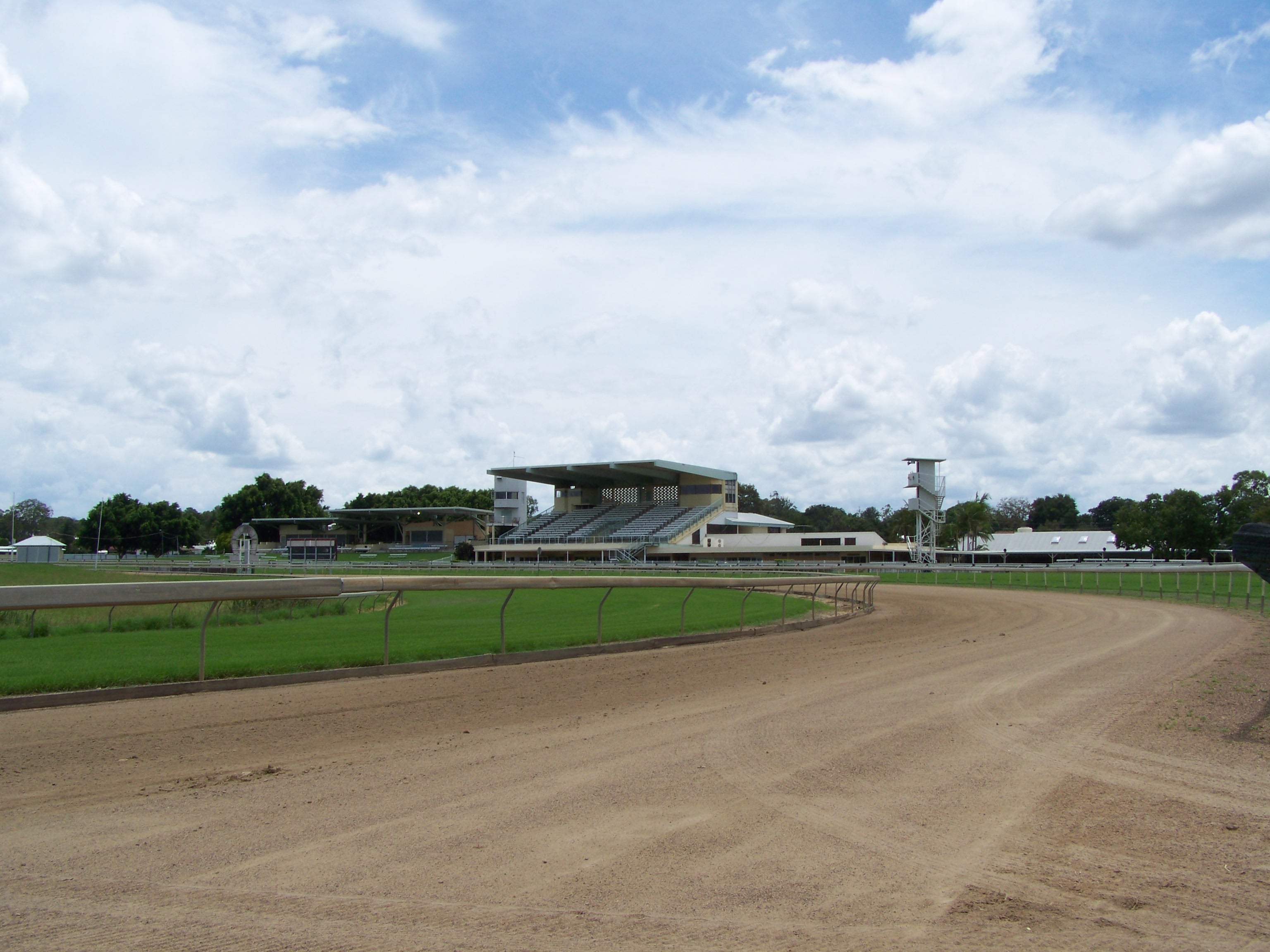
Ipswich Racecourse

Brisbane Road enters the suburb from the east (Ebbw Vale) and exits to the west (Booval). The Main Line railway runs just to the north of Brisbane Road, entering the east (Dinmore), forming part of the eastern boundary with Ebbw Vale, then traverses the suburb exiting to the west (North Booval / Booval). The suburb is served by the Bundamba railway station (27.6075°S 152.8049°E). The Swanbank railway line splits from the main track at Bundamba railway station to serve the Swanbank Power Station in Swanbank to the south with Bundamba Racecourse railway station just across the suburb boundary in Booval (27.6136°S 152.8011°E) serving the racecourse.

The Cunningham Highway forms a small section of the suburb's south-eastern boundary (New Chum).

Bundamba has the following hills:

- Bergins Hill (27.6132°S 152.8199°E) 84 metres (276 ft) above sea level
- Station Hill (27.6059°S 152.8102°E) 59 metres (194 ft) above sea level

which are the focal point for two neighbourhoods within the suburb:

- Bergins Hill (27.615°S 152.8094°E)
- Station Hill (27.6066°S 152.8094°E)

The suburb consists of residential and industrial areas, with a variety of shops lining Brisbane Road. There is grazing on land near the river in the north of the suburb.

== History ==
The origin of the name Bundamba is from the Ugarapul language meaning place of the stone axe. It was initially written as Bundumba, then Bundanba, and then on 30 January 1932, the name was officially standardised as Bundamba.

The name Bergins may refer to either Denis Bergin or Thomas Bergin. Denis Bergin was the publican of the Prince Alfred Hotel at Bundamba; he was also a prospector and the Bergin coal seam is named after him. Thomas Bergin was a bailiff who lived in the area.

A Primitive Methodist Church opened on Monday 31 July 1865 in Mr Seymour's paddock.

Bundamba Lower State School opened on 7 February 1873. In 1913 it was renamed Bundamba State School.

Bundamba Upper State School opened on 2 February 1874. In 1909. it was renamed Ripley State School. It closed in 1930 due to low student numbers. It was at 1166-1176 Ripley Road in present-day South Ripley.

From the 1880s, the Redbank - Bundamba Loop Line was progressively developed to provide a series of railway sidings serving the coal mines in the area.

In December 1895 the Anglican Diocese's architect John Buckeridge called for tenders to erect the Church of All Saints in Bundanba. The land was donated by Miss Ferrett and Mr Harry Ferrett. Bishop William Webber laid the foundation stone on Friday 24 January 1896. Bishop Webber opened and dedicated the new church on Saturday 16 May 1896. In April 1897 Harry Ferrett was married in the church. In 1913 the church building was moved by rolling it on beer barrels to Silkstone. In 1930 it was moved again on a flat-top lorry to its current location in Booval. A new church hall for All Saints' Anglican Church was opened in Booval on Sunday 10 May 1930. The second All Saints' Anglican Church was dedicated in Booval in 1983.

Bundamba State High School opened on 27 January 1970 and was renamed Bundamba State Secondary College on 1 January 2003.

At some time after 1980, Bundamba Uniting Church and Blackstone Uniting Church joined Trinity Uniting Church in North Booval which was then renamed Trinity Ipswich Uniting Church.

Motivated by the Millennium drought, the Bundamba Advanced Water Treatment Plant commenced construction in September 2006 and was completed in June 2008. It was built as part of the Western Corridor Recycled Water Project. Its purpose was to supply purified recycled water for use in the Swanbank Power Station which had previously drawn its water from the Wivenhoe Dam, competing with the supply of drinking water.

== Demographics ==
In the 2016 census, Bundamba had a population of 6,514 people.

In the 2021 census, Bundamba had a population of 6,542 people.

== Education ==
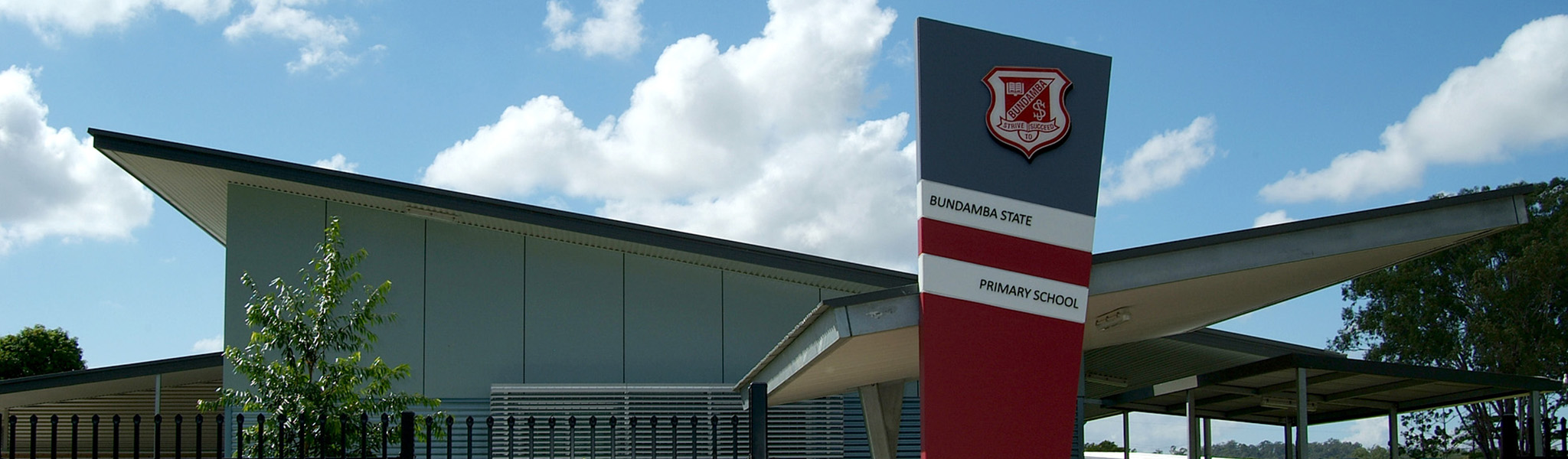
Bundamba State School, 2010

Bundamba State School is a government primary (Early Childhood-6) school for boys and girls at 221 Brisbane Road (27.6112°S 152.8044°E). In 2018, the school had an enrolment of 551 students with 44 teachers (41 full-time equivalent) and 28 non-teaching staff (20 full-time equivalent). It includes a special education program.

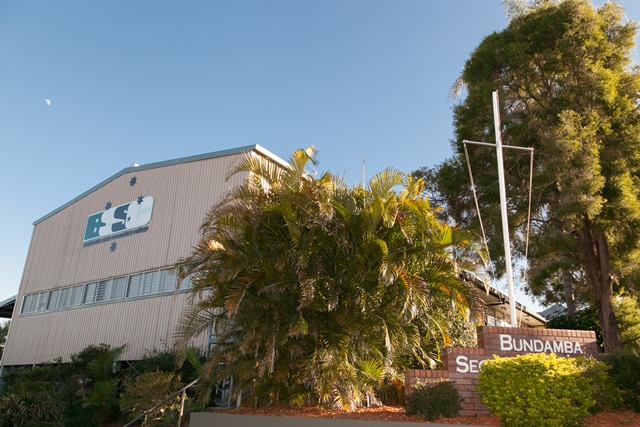
School hall, Bundamba State Secondary College, 2015

Bundamba State Secondary College is a government secondary (7-12) school for boys and girls at 15a Naomai Street (27.6149°S 152.8136°E). In 2018, the school had an enrolment of 897 students with 86 teachers (83 full-time equivalent) and 52 non-teaching staff (36 full-time equivalent). It includes a special education program and an intensive English language program.

Bundamba has a campus of TAFE Queensland (formerly known as The Bremer Institute of TAFE) at 22 Byrne Street (27.6047°S 152.8108°E). It delivers post-secondary practical vocational training.

Bundamba has a campus of the Queensland Pathways State College on the corner of Mary and Byrne Streets on the TAFE campus (27.6048°S 152.8109°E). The college is a secondary (10-12) school for boys and girls, which seeks to retain students in school who have difficulties in engaging with mainstream secondary education. The college has its headquarters in Coorparoo, Brisbane.

Bundamba has a campus of the YMCA Vocational School at the corner of River Road and Mary Street on the TAFE campus (27.6040°S 152.8096°E). It is a private secondary (8-12) facility for boys and girls with a focus on vocational training for marginalised or disadvantaged The school has its headquarters at Kingston in Logan City.

== Facilities ==
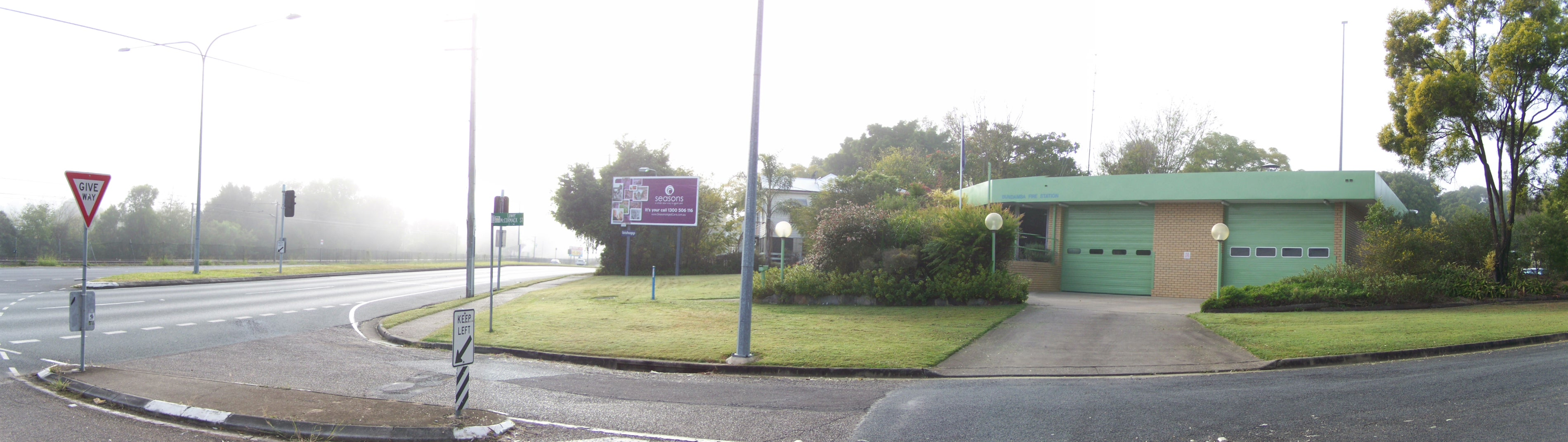
Bundamba Fire Station

Bundamba Advanced Water Treatment Plant is a sewage treatment plant at 5 Hanlon Street (27.5891°S 152.8103°E) in the north of the suburb near the Bremer River. It supplies purified recycled water to the Swanbank Power Station through a 7.3-kilometre (4.5 mi) pipeline.

Bundamba Fire Station is at 61 Brisbane Road (27.6074°S 152.8145°E).

== Amenities ==
Sports facilities in the suburb include:

- Ipswich Knights Soccer Club at 254 Brisbane Street (coord|-27.6107|152.8011|type:landmark_region:AU-QLD|name=Ipswich Knights Soccer Club)
- Bundamba Gym & Swim Centre at 256 Brisbane Road (27.6109°S 152.8028°E)
- Sport centre at 21 Agnes Street (27.6086°S 152.8032°E) offering roller skating and rebound volleyball

There are a number of parks in the area:

- Alf Kalamafoni Park (27.6134°S 152.8148°E)
- Alfred Seymour Park (27.5994°S 152.8071°E)
- Ann Street Reserve (27.6090°S 152.8144°E)
- Betty Bork Park (27.5924°S 152.8300°E)
- Bill Austin Park (27.6138°S 152.8188°E)
- Bundamba Memorial Park (27.6097°S 152.8094°E)
- Bundamba Swim Centre (27.6111°S 152.8027°E)
- Jack Barkley Park (27.6073°S 152.7981°E)
- Len & Susan Miller Park (27.6179°S 152.8186°E)
- Lorikeet Street Reserve (27.6124°S 152.8120°E)
- Muller Park (27.6078°S 152.8192°E)
- Norm Brown Park (27.6094°S 152.8155°E)
- Quinn Court Reserve (27.5965°S 152.8286°E)
- Rotary Park (27.6105°S 152.8021°E)
- Thomas Purnell Park (27.6094°S 152.7989°E)
- Tite Family Park (27.6045°S 152.8025°E)
- Tom Easterbrook Park (27.6235°S 152.8134°E)

== Attractions ==
Steam trains operated by Queensland Pioneer Steam Railway runs tourist services between Bundamba Racecourse railway station and Swanbank station.

== Transport ==
Bundamba railway station provides access to regular Queensland Rail City network services to Brisbane, Ipswich and Rosewood via Ipswich.
