= Bundamba Racecourse railway station =

Railway station in Brisbane, Queensland, Australia

Coordinates: 27.6136°S 152.8011°E

The Bundamba Racecourse railway station is located in Booval, City of Ipswich, Queensland, Australia (). It is on the Redbank - Bundamba Loop line which extends to the Swanbank Power Station in Swanbank.

== Description ==
The Racecourse platform is opposite from the entrance to Bundamba Racecourse. The Racecourse is provided with more facilities than the usual provincial meeting and, on Bundamba race days, metropolitan races in Brisbane are not run. To provide services for the Brisbane racegoer, public transport operates to Bundamba and takes the form of trains, buses and taxis.

All trains are hauled by B18¼ Class or BB18¼ Class 4-6-2 locomotives, and wooden suburban carriages are normally used. Up to and during 1962, four trains were run to the course on meeting days and one of these trains ran an additional shuttle service by returning to Bundamba, to connect with a regular Brisbane - Ipswich suburban train. From the first meeting in 1963, a decline in patronage has resulted in services being reduced to three trains, plus the shuttle service. In the next coming years the shuttle service ceased altogether.

Racecourse siding was shortened by five chains at the Bundamba end in connection with the installation of flashing lights at the busy Brisbane Road level crossing on 5 November 1963 with a two-position colour light Down Starter from the Racecourse to Bundamba.

The Bundamba Racecourse station is used by Queensland Pioneer Steam Railway for the tourist train services between Bundamba Racecourse station and Swanbank.
