= Silkstone State School =

- Location within Queensland
- 27.6190°S 152.7841°E
- Location: Molloy Street, Silkstone, City of Ipswich, Queensland, Australia

History
- Design period: 1914–1919 (World War I)
- Built: 1915, 1915, 1918, 1928, Formal Garden, front path

Site notes
- Architect: Department of Public Works (Queensland)

Queensland Heritage Register
- Official name: Silkstone State School
- Type: state heritage
- Designated: 29 March 2019
- Reference no.: 650091
- Type: Education, research, scientific facility: School-state
- Theme: Educating Queenslanders: Providing primary schooling
- Builders: Department of Public Works

Silkstone State School is a heritage-listed state school at Molloy Street, Silkstone, City of Ipswich, Queensland, Australia. It was designed by the Department of Public Works and built in 1915 by the Department of Public Works. It was added to the Queensland Heritage Register on 29 March 2019.

== History ==
Silkstone State School was established in 1915, originally on a 9-acre (3.6 ha) site, 2.7 kilometres (1.7 mi) east of the Ipswich CBD. More land was added to the school between 1946 and 1948, totalling the size of the school at 13 acres (5.3 ha). The school retains an excellent example of a suburban timber school building (Block A, built 1915) set in landscaped grounds with mature trees and playing fields. In continuous operation since its establishment, it has been a focus for the local community as a place for important social and cultural activities.

The Ipswich area was the traditional land of the Jagara people. Free European settlement began in the area in 1842 and it developed as a mining town and river port for Darling Downs pastoralists, becoming a municipality (Borough of Ipswich) in 1860.

Coal mining was one of Ipswich's premier industries and by the turn of the century several extensive coal mines employing large numbers of miners had been established on the Ipswich coal fields, several kilometres east of the city's CBD. The largest and most profitable mine by this time was Aberdare, owned by former Welsh miner and prominent Ipswich entrepreneur, Lewis Thomas. Miners and their families, many of whom had come to Australia from Wales, lived in the suburbs near the fields, including Blackstone, Bundamba, Newtown, and Silkstone. This close-knit mining community celebrated their Welsh culture, establishing one of Queensland's earliest Welsh churches (United Welsh Church) in Blackstone in 1886. One year later they held the first eisteddfod, heralding the beginning of this continuing tradition in Ipswich.

To service this population, Newtown State School was established in 1882. As enrolments grew the school became overcrowded and residents in neighbouring suburbs, particularly Silkstone, whose children attended the Newtown school, appealed to the Department of Public Instruction for a school of their own. The department decided to construct a new, larger school for the area, replacing the Newtown school. In 1914 it purchased a 9-acre (3.6 ha) hilltop site, overlooking the surrounding area, for the new school. The former site of the Newtown school became Newtown Park (approximately 500m west of Silkstone State School).

Under the stewardship of the Department of Public Works (DPW) and its staff (who were some of Queensland's most innovative architects), school buildings became more advanced through an evolution of standard designs. The department retained responsibility for school design from 1893 to 2013 and focused on improving the natural ventilation and lighting of classroom interiors to produce superior education environments. In the early 20th century, with a growing concern about child health in education, the DPW evolved its school building designs with recommendations from medical professionals on light and ventilation. Notably, high-set buildings were introduced c. 1909, providing better ventilation as well as informal teaching space and a covered play area in the understorey. This form became characteristic of Queensland schools. A technical innovation developed at this time was a continuous, hinged ventilation flap on the wall at floor level to increase air flow into the classroom and, combined with a ceiling vent and large roof fleche, improved internal air quality and decreased temperatures. Windows were considerably enlarged and sills were lowered to provide a greater amount of light into the room. These windows were provided to one wall of the classroom only, the wall to the left hand side of the student, and any other windows remained small and very highset. Dr Eleanor Bourne's stress on light from the left hand side is only one of her many recommendations for the health of children. However, it is not clear if this was to encourage right handedness. Smaller classrooms in serial arrangement were preferred as they were easier to light well and correctly. The lighter and airier interiors met with immediate approval from educationalists.

The early twentieth century experimentation culminated in the 1914 introduction of the suburban timber school building type, solving many of the problems of light, ventilation, and classroom size that plagued previous school designs, as well as providing the ideal, modern education environment. The grandest of the standard timber designs of the time, and including all of the lighting and ventilation techniques developed, the type was used for large, model, or high-profile schools in growing suburban areas. It was not extensively deployed, lasting until around 1920. It was this new type (designated C/T8) that was chosen for Silkstone and it would be the most substantial built. In 2019 Silkstone is the most substantial extant example of the type and the most substantial known to have been built. It is comparable to Gympie State High School (built 1917, destroyed by fire 1955) and Bundaberg State High School (Block D, designed 1919 and built 1920, extant in 2019) but both are smaller than Silkstone. No other buildings of this type are known to have been built that are comparable in size to Silkstone. Gympie had 12 classrooms with 507.06 square metres (5,457.9 sq ft) of total classroom area and 8 feet 6 inches (2.59 m) wide verandahs. Bundaberg had ten classrooms with 522.47 square metres (5,623.8 sq ft) total classroom area and 7 feet (2.1 m) wide verandahs. Silkstone had ten classrooms with 567.20 square metres (6,105.3 sq ft) total classroom area and 10 feet (3.0 m) wide verandahs.

In May 1915, a marble tablet requested by the school committee was laid at the school by the Minister for Public Instruction, JW Blair, on the centre of the understorey wall of the building, which was still under construction. Amongst other dignitaries present, was the Under-Secretary for Education, JD Story. The ceremony was well attended by school committee members, parents, and future students. The minister proclaimed that "the people were about to have a new school on most modern lines, erected on one of the finest sites in Queensland ... It was for the sake of the child that the new and improved style of school building had been introduced".

The new school was officially opened on 4 December 1915. Initially called the Silkstone-Newtown School, by August 1916 it was formally named Silkstone State School. The opening ceremony was attended by the Minister for Public Instruction, HF Hardacre, as well as other dignitaries including JD Story. Amidst a large crowd of staff, parents, students, and community members, the Minister declared Silkstone State School "one of the most beautiful schools, if not the most beautiful wooden school in Queensland". Further, he stated "the development of a series of architectural schemes had resulted in the present building, with its excellent provision for light, ventilation, and sanitation".

The new school building (known as Block A in 2019) was believed at the time to be the most innovative school design in Queensland, surpassing the much-celebrated Cannon Hill State School that had been opened only two months before (also a suburban timber school building). Cannon Hill State School was officially opened 25 September 1915 by Hardacre who then said it was the "best in the state on grounds of health and economy". Cannon Hill's suburban timber school building had seven classrooms, three fewer than Silkstone, while its classrooms were between 40.8 and 52 square metres (439 and 560 sq ft) compared to Silkstone's 42.3 and 64.6 square metres (455 and 695 sq ft). The two schools were similar in architectural detail and employed the same light and ventilation techniques. Silkstone State School stood on an elevated site, overlooking the district and to the distant southern mountains. It was a weatherboard structure with a 6 feet 6 inches (1.98 m) tall, open understorey of brick piers which included concreted play areas and small "lavatory stands" (hand washing basins). The building had a gabled Marseilles tile-clad roof with ventilation fleches and decorative timber work. It accommodated ten classrooms, separated by tall, glazed timber folding partitions with "hyloplate" (blackboard) panes, allowing the spaces to be combined. Of the ten classrooms: eight were 24 feet (7.3 m) wide by 19 feet (5.8 m) long, and two were 29 feet (8.8 m) wide by 24 feet (7.3 m) long. The building had 10 feet (3.0 m) wide verandahs on one side of the classrooms only. A head teacher's office and separate staff room were accommodated in a small central front projecting block.

The classrooms had abundant natural light and ventilation. They had 15 feet (4.6 m) high coved ceilings lined with decorative pressed metal and ventilation grilles connected via ducts to the roof fleches. The verandah walls had a hinged ventilation board at the base and windows in this wall were very highset with 8 feet (2.4 m) high sills. Other than these windows, each classroom had one wall with a large area of windows, sheltered by an external hood. The desks and hyloplate were arranged in relation to this window so that light from it fell on the left hand side of the student. These large windows were lowset with 3 feet (0.91 m) sills, an "acid obscured glass" bottom sash, and a fanlight that was fixed open. In this way optimum, single source light was provided yet a student's view outside was blocked.

A timber-framed and -clad teachers residence was also built on the north-east corner of the site in 1915. The total cost for both buildings was £4629. The Minister explained that "the influences of surroundings were so valuable that the Department was doing well in spending sums of money in beautifying architecture". He believed it would benefit the characters of children as well as being a credit to Queensland. The school was one of the largest in Queensland at the time with Block A designed to accommodate 528 students.

An important component of Queensland state schools was their grounds. The early and continuing commitment to play-based education, particularly in primary school, resulted in the provision of outdoor play space and sports facilities, such as ovals and tennis courts. Also, trees and gardens were planted to shade and beautify schools and schools celebrated Arbor Day from 1890. Aesthetically designed gardens were encouraged by regional inspectors, and educators believed gardening and Arbor Days instilled in young minds the value of hard work and activity, improved classroom discipline, developed aesthetic tastes, and inspired people to stay on the land.

From its beginning, Silkstone State School had a strong and active school committee which successfully implemented major improvements over many years. On 20 April 1916 the committee held an Anzac Day ceremony at the school featuring a flag raising ceremony on a recently installed flagpole donated by the Minister for Railways and fabricated in the Ipswich Railway Workshops. The school bell was also donated by the Ipswich workshops, with the pole on which it sat, donated by the Camerons, a prominent Ipswich family. Both the bell and flagpole were aligned with the centre of Block A with the bell post immediately north of Block A and the flagpole slightly north of where the formal entrance garden was later developed. The Anzac Day ceremony was attended by teachers and students and patriotic, moral lessons were given. Arbor Day was first celebrated at the school on 1 May 1916 and repeated in September that year. Both were well attended and Ipswich City Council donated many of the trees. Students were tasked with preparing the ground prior to planting. Following the initial ground preparations, the holes were deepened using gelignite donated by the Aberdare Collieries and detonated by local miners. Many trees were planted in the grounds and each teacher from the school was given the opportunity to name a tree; several were named after Department of Public Instruction administrators and others after former head teachers. By 1957 the flagpole was moved to the south of Block A in a small, central formal garden, while the bell was mounted to a square timber post (probably part of the original post) on the south porch of Block A at some time prior to 1985, probably at the time the teacher's room was extended in 1973.

Through the school committee's fund raising efforts and a "successful garden fete" held in the school grounds, in 1918 two tennis courts were laid south of the teacher's residence. The courts were revenue-producing, leased to sporting groups on Saturdays and hosted local and interstate competitive matches in the following decades. Over the years the tennis courts' surfaces were repeatedly refurbished to provide for superior playing.

Enrolments grew and in 1922 a new infants school building was built at a distance south of Block A. As with Block A, the infants school was designed on the most modern lines to provide the best learning environment for the children.

The school committee was active in the interwar years. Through its fundraising events it completed grounds improvement projects in the school, often with volunteer labour. This included a swimming pool in 1927, a path from Glebe Road to the front of the school laid by 1928, and a fernery and aviary in 1928. In 1929 the committee built a large gold-fish pond with elaborate central fountain in the front formal garden and decorative timber archways at the garden entrance. The committee purchased a film projector in 1933 for educational films for the children, making Silkstone State School the first Queensland school to install this innovative teaching technology.

In 1934 Block A's roof tiles were replaced with corrugated metal sheets, which was also performed on the teachers residence the following year. In 1937 the infants school was extended. During the Great Depression, further groundworks were undertaken by relief workers including cementing paths, fence maintenance, and building stone retaining walls to create terraces including terracing the northern playing field between Glebe Road and Block A was terraced into three flat fields.

The school grounds were extended westwards in 1947 when the land fronting Prospect Street was gradually acquired, affording the school a complete block. This comprised multiple land parcels and the relocation of a house off the site in 1948. Soon after, trees from the Ipswich City Council's nursery were planted along the Prospect Street boundary.

By 1951 enrolments at Silkstone State School had reached 1,000 students. To accommodate this, new classroom buildings were constructed between 1950 and 1963: Block E, three classrooms (1950); Block M, a temporary three classroom building (1951); Block D, five classrooms (1955); Block C, four classrooms (1956); and Block G, two classrooms (1963).

In 1954, a survey of Ipswich state schools praised Silkstone as having "one of the best" playing areas that left "little to be desired". Silkstone was then the "biggest state school in the area with an enrolment of 1100" and had "a playground area recognised as one of the best in the state".

For the school's 75th anniversary in 1957, a decorative metal entrance gate with brick pillars was constructed on Glebe Road. It was unveiled in November of that year by the Minister for Education, JCA Pizzey, and a plaque was laid to honour the occasion.

In the 1960s the local Lions Club planted a row of pencil pines along Molloy Street boundary on the east side of the south playing field.

Further buildings were added over time. A canteen was built in 1969. In the 1970s a preschool unit (Prep in 2019), classroom building (Block H in 2019), and library building were constructed. In 1996 a new classroom building (Block B in 2019) was built west of the library. In 2008 two large new brick classroom buildings (Blocks J and K in 2019) were added on the southern part of the north playing field (by this time the north playing field had lost its retaining walls dividing the different levels) and a modular building for Outside School Hours Care was added between the residence and the tennis courts. In c. 2010 another modular building was added for prep classes and a new large multi-purpose hall replaced the earlier hall. Some of the mature trees planted along Prospect Street in the late 1940s were removed for this building.

Deliberately-lit fires caused considerable damage to the school. The first in 1996 destroyed a 1950s classroom block. The second on 21 September 2009 destroyed the 1922 infants school buildings.

Over the years the fernery, aviary, the garden's archways, fish pond, and fountain were removed. The brick pillars at the Glebe Road entrance were removed and replaced by steel posts. However, the decorative ironwork was retained. Most of the stone retaining walls in the school were also removed, including the terracing on the north playing field.

Changes have been made to Block A over time. By 1948 enclosures were made to the verandahs and understorey and in 1973 the teachers rooms were extended. In 1992 the building was partially converted for administration use with the removal of folding partitions and pressed metal ceilings from these rooms and addition of suspended ceilings and partitions to form small offices. Some high-level windows were removed, doors and windows were rearranged, and new double hung windows were added. In 2009 some external stairs were demolished, verandahs were opened up with reconstruction of original verandah details, a lift was added to the central projecting wing, and further partitions were added.

In January 2015 the school residence was sold, becoming a private residence.

Silkstone State School, established in 1915, has played an important role in the Silkstone and district community and continues to do so. Generations of students have been taught there and many social events held in the school's grounds and buildings since its establishment. With its strong Welsh heritage, Silkstone State School has a long history of involvement in eisteddfods and over the years has achieved many awards for choral work. The school continues to be a centre for social, sporting and community events.

== Description ==
Silkstone State School stands on a large site in the suburb of Silkstone, 2.7 kilometres (1.7 mi) east of the Ipswich CBD. Bounded by roads on all sides, the school occupies an entire town block except for the northeast corner, where the former head teacher's residence, standing in a separate house yard, is now a private residence (not part of the QHR place). A complex of teaching buildings stands on the middle of the site with a playing field on the north and south sides.

The features of state level cultural heritage significance are:

- the site layout
- Block A, a large timber teaching building
- front entrance gate, path, formal garden, and forecourt
- north (front) and south playing fields
- tennis court
- mature trees

=== Block A (1915), suburban timber school building (C/T8) ===
Block A is a large symmetrical timber-framed and -clad building with a prominent gable roof surmounted by three tall ventilation fleches. Highset on tall face brick pillars, it is E-shaped in plan with centre and end wings projecting north to the building's front. The building has wide verandahs, with sweeping timber brackets and battened balustrade, that are the primary circulation. At the building's rear (south) is a small projecting porch with flanking stairs and battened timber work.

The building has been converted to administration use and has had seven of its ten large former classrooms divided by partitions to form smaller offices with suspended ceilings. The original lofty coved ceilings lined with pressed metal have been removed in some locations but are retained in at least four classrooms.

Doors and windows have been altered over time and include double-hung windows (c. 1992) onto the verandahs that mimic traditional detail.

=== Front Entrance Gate (1957) ===
A metal front entrance gate stands on the Glebe Street boundary and is the formal entrance to the school. It comprises metal side posts (which have replaced the original brick pillars), short decorative metal gates, and a decorative metal overhead arch bearing the school name.

=== Front Entrance Path (by late 1920s) ===
A straight concrete pedestrian path runs from the front entrance gate through the formal garden to the forecourt in front of Block A. The path is shaded by a grove of trees (existing here prior to 1946). The trees are an informal mixture of mature and immature or short-lived species including jacarandas, figs, palms, eucalypts, and melaleucas: none is of state level cultural heritage significance individually, however, their general location, form, character, and composition is.

=== Formal Garden (by 1928) ===
The formal garden is a large shield-shaped open grassed space enclosed by a low wide hedge. It is bisected by the front entrance path, which also branches to encircle it on the outside of the hedge on both sides. It has a central circular garden bed.

=== Forecourt (by 1928) ===
The forecourt is a flat area immediately north of the centre of Block A with a curved, branching concrete path from the front entrance path to both stairs of Block A. The layout is original but surfaces are modern.

=== North and South Playing Fields (1915) ===
The north and south playing fields are large grassed recreation fields for play and informal sport.

=== Tennis Court (1918) ===
A tennis court stands east of the front entrance path in its original location and size. It has a concrete surface surrounded by a tall chain link fence. Its appearance blends with the overall landscape and its surface colour and markings are not conspicuous.

=== Mature Trees ===
Additional to those mentioned earlier, trees of state level cultural heritage significance include:

- large shade trees on the school boundaries – a mix of trees including figs (Ficus sp.)
- a line of 'pencil pines' (Cupressus sp.) (planted 1960s) along the boundary between Molloy Street and the south playing field (remnants of a longer line, which was originally evenly-spaced)
- large shade trees (figs) on north edge of south playing field

== Heritage listing ==
Silkstone State School was listed on the Queensland Heritage Register on 29 March 2019 having satisfied the following criteria.

The place is important in demonstrating the evolution or pattern of Queensland's history.

Silkstone State School (opened 1915) is important in demonstrating the evolution of state education and its associated architecture in Queensland. The place retains an outstanding representative example of a standard government design that was a response to prevailing government educational philosophies. The suburban timber school building (Block A, built 1915), the most substantial example of its type, demonstrates the evolution of timber school design, including experimentation with light and ventilation, by the Department of Public Works.

The school's generous, elevated site and formal layout including entrance garden, mature trees, and open fields for play and sport demonstrates the importance of play and aesthetics in the education of children.

The place is important in demonstrating the principal characteristics of a particular class of cultural places.

Silkstone State School is important in demonstrating the principal characteristics of a Queensland state school of the early 20th century. These include: a teaching building of standard design by the DPW set in a landscaped site with mature trees, gardens, and play and sport areas.

Block A is an intact example of a suburban timber school building and demonstrates the principal characteristics of this type. These include highset timber-framed and -clad construction; open understorey accommodating play areas; facebrick understorey piers; symmetrical design with classroom wings linked by verandahs; verandah brackets; teachers rooms; hat and cloak rooms; and features for natural light and ventilation, including elevated classrooms with open understorey, high level windows and fanlights, lofty and coved ventilated ceilings, hinged wall ventilation flaps at floor level, and distinctive roof fleches.

The place is important because of its aesthetic significance.

Silkstone State School has aesthetic significance for its picturesque qualities created by the carefully composed relationship between Block A and landscape features of the place. Standing on the centre and highest part of the site, Block A is reached via an axial pedestrian path from a decorative entrance gate, through a grove, to a formal entrance garden and forecourt that reveals the building's impressive form.

Block A has a sense of pleasant simplicity and order through its elevated symmetrical form, dominant roof with prominent fleches, wide verandahs, extensive well-crafted timber work, and coved pressed metal ceilings. The building is enhanced by its setting with vistas to and from the building across the open, treed grounds.

The grounds include lines of mature boundary trees, and large grassed playing fields to the north and south, which creates an open verdant character within the surrounding close residential development.

The place has a strong or special association with a particular community or cultural group for social, cultural or spiritual reasons.

Silkstone State School has a strong and ongoing association with past and present pupils, parents, staff members, and the surrounding community through sustained use since its establishment in 1915. The place is important for its contribution to the educational development of Ipswich, with generations of children taught at the school, and has served as a prominent venue for social interaction and community focus. Contributions to its operations have been made through repeated local volunteer action, donations, and an active Parents and Citizens Association.
