= Box Flat Mine =

Coal mine in Queensland, Australia

- Location in Australia
- Location: Ipswich, Queensland, Australia; 27°39′26.33″S 152°48′26.44″E
- Products: Coal
- Opened: 1969
- Closed: 1987
- Company: Wm McQueen & Co.

The Box Flat Mine or Box Flat Colliery was located at Swanbank in Ipswich, Queensland, Australia. The mine opened in 1969 and operated until its closure on 30 June 1987. Its coal was mined for the operation of the Swanbank Power Station.

== Explosion ==
The Box Flat Mine disaster occurred on the 31 July 1972 when 17 miners lost their lives after an underground gas and coal dust explosion, 14 men who were working in the vicinity of the explosion and three miners who were working on a belt adjacent to the mine entrance. An eighteenth man Clarence Edwin Wolski died on 20 February 1974 as a direct result of injuries sustained in the Box Flat explosion. Eight of the dead were part of the mine rescue team.

At 6pm on 19 July, spontaneous combustion occurred in a pile of fallen coal in No. 2 level of Box Flat No.5 mine, assisted by a scheduled fan stoppage, during which reduced air flow allowed self-ignition of the coal heap. This developed into a large fire over an 8-hour period, assisted by the increased air flow when the mine fan was restarted. An explosive mixture of gases generated from the fire, water gas and coal dust, was ignited with resulting explosions in No 5 and No 7 mines, which were interconnected, at 2.47am.

A mine warden who was sent to investigate the explosion died later as a result of his injuries and some workers at the surface were also injured in the explosion. A later report found that safety requirements and regulations at the mine had not been complied with at the time of the accident, although it stopped short of concluding that these lapses were the cause of the disaster.

After the explosion, it was determined that no one could have survived and the decision was made not to send in rescuers in case there would be another explosion and instead seal the tunnel's entrances. The miners' bodies were never retrieved.

The incident was the worst mining disaster in Ipswich's history.

== Memorial ==
A memorial can be found at the old mine-site on Swanbank Road located near the power station. It honours those who lost their lives in the Box Flat Mine disaster. A bridge on an extension to the Centenary Highway is named in honour of the lives lost in the 1972 disaster.

== Legacy ==
The Box Flat Mine was serviced by the Bundamba-Swanbank coal line. After the Box Flat Mine closure the need to transport coal to fuel the power station became imperative. The Bundamba-Swanbank coal line transported most coal to the power station, so an additional balloon loop was built for the delivery of coal. There are now two balloon loops located on the branch line, the first balloon was used to stockpile coal for the power station, this loop is known as Box Flat. The second loop is known as Swanbank balloon and was used to deliver coal directly to the power station. The power station now uses gas as fuel and coal is no longer required.

The line has two uses. Queensland Pioneer Steam Railway operates a heritage steam train tour on a section of the line through the Box Flat balloon. It is also used by Queensland Rail to transport rail ballast from the stockpile which is kept at Box Flat.

== See also ==
- Coal in Australia
- List of disasters in Australia by death toll
