= Redbank-Bundamba Loop Line and The Swanbank Extension =

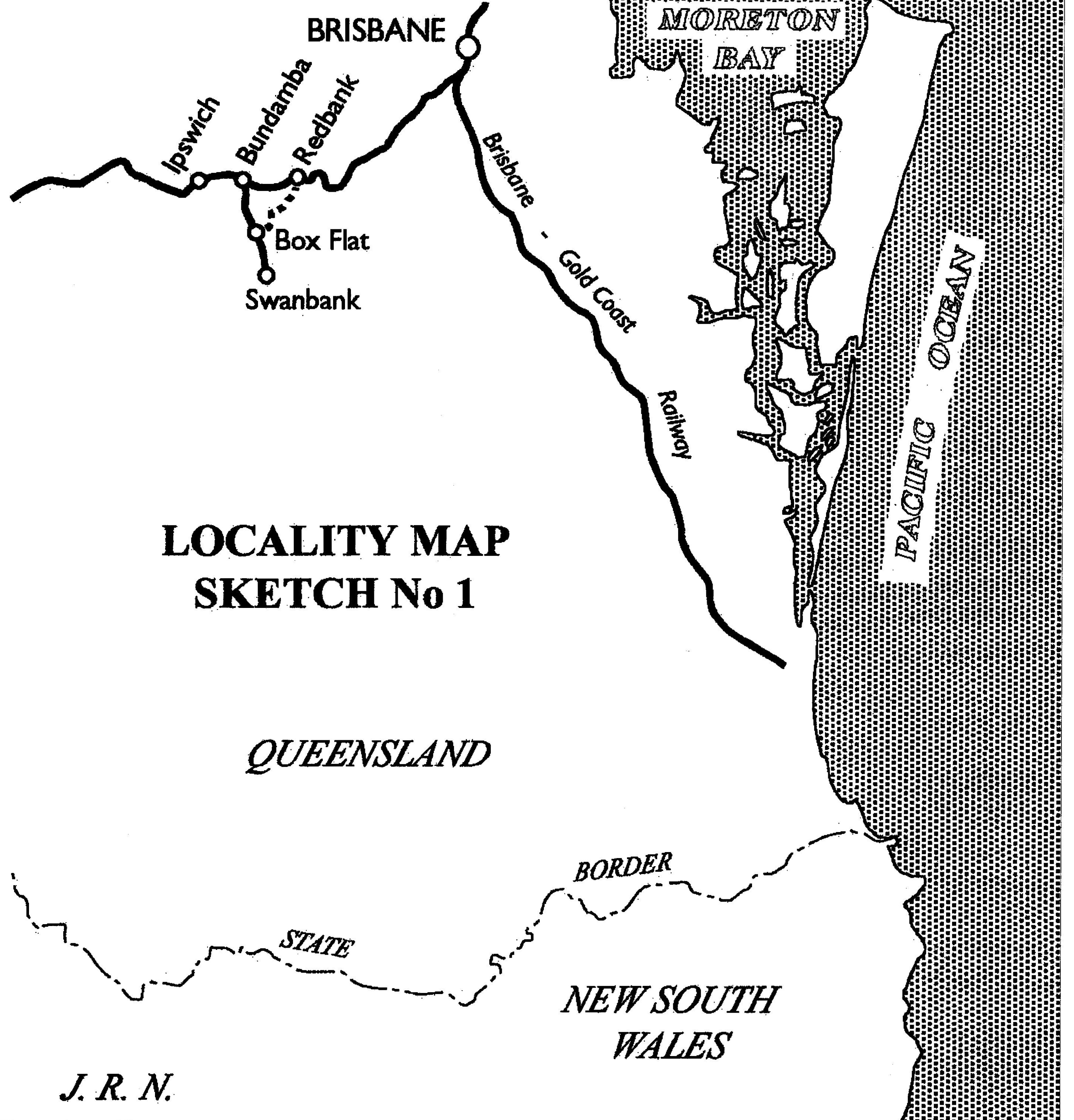
Map of Redbank-Bundamba Loop Line and The Swanbank Extension

The Redbank-Bundamba Loop Line was a branch line off the Main Line railway near Brisbane, Queensland, Australia. It was built to convey coal from the Bundamba and Redbank areas of the Ipswich coalfields. The Redbank-Bundamba Loop Line ran generally south-west from Redbank station to a point near Bundamba Creek called Box Flat Junction and from that point generally north along Bundamba Creek to Bundamba station.

The Swanbank Extension ran generally south-easterly from Box Flat Junction to the end of its extension. After the closure of the Redbank - Box Flat Junction section due to the closure of the nearby coal mines, this line remained to convey coal to the Swanbank Power Station.

== History ==
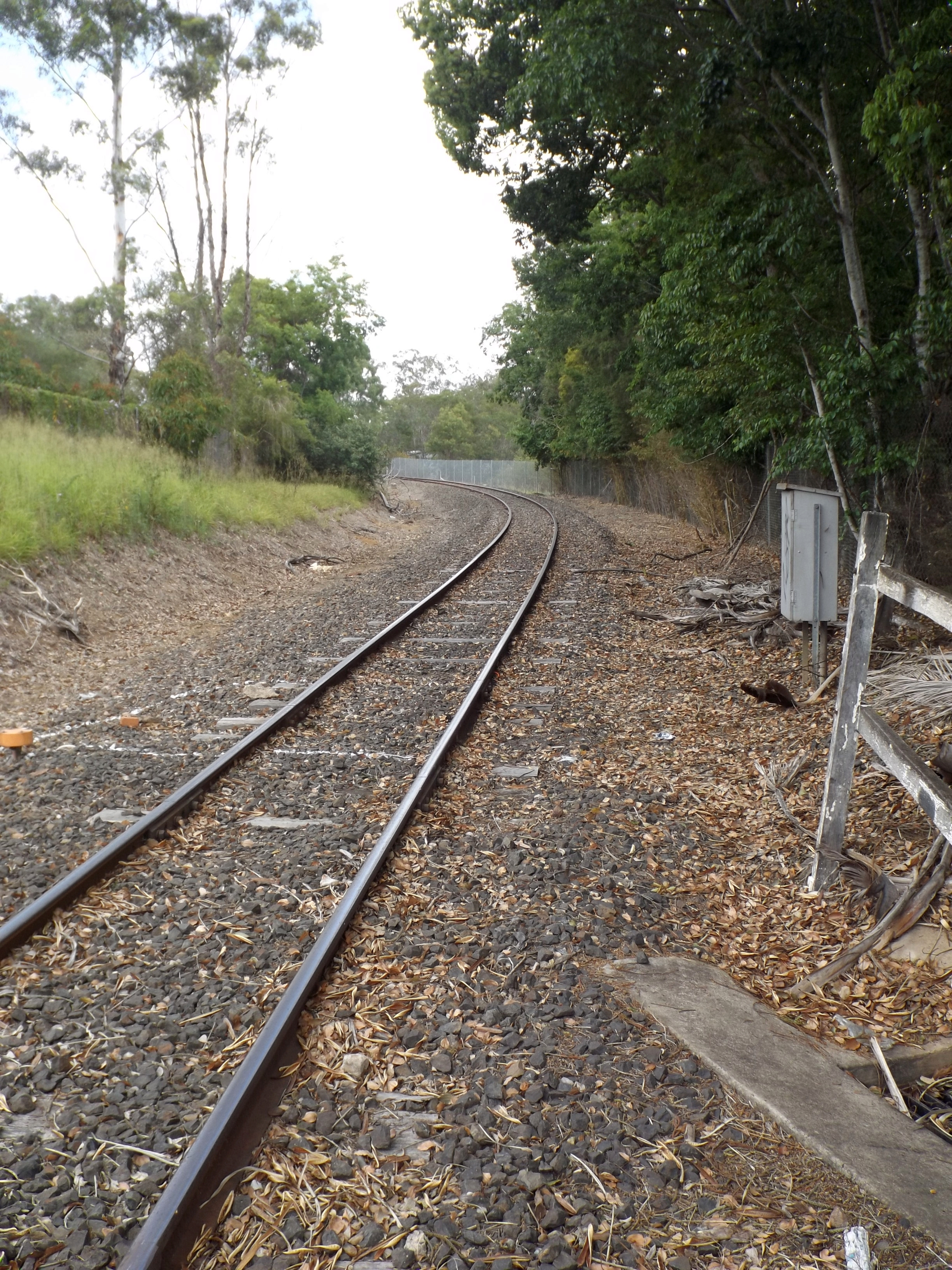
Swanbank Extension at Blackstone, 2015

In 1881, Lewis Thomas received parliamentary approval to build a 2 km tramway from Bundamba to his coal mine known as Aberdare at Blackleg Gully. In 1886, a 1 km extension to the West Moreton Colliery at Swanbank was approved, and the line was extended from the West Moreton Mine 3 km to New Swanbank Colliery and opened in 1895. Thomas's Railway Line was purchased by Queensland Government Railways on 1 January 1897. In 1975, the line was extended 5 km to the Swanbank power station.

A 10 km line from Redbank to a point originally known as '3 Mile 8 Chains' (now Box Flat Junction) was opened in 1904. From that time a succession of shunt trains serviced the numerous private sidings serving the new mines. Workers travelled in carriages attached to early morning and late afternoon shunt trains.

The line also served the Bundamba racecourse, with a platform about 1 km south of the junction. On race days special trains from Brisbane would run to and from the platform. The Redbank - Box Flat Junction section closed between 1971 and 1978. The Swanbank line (as the remainder became known) services the Box Flat mine (which began exporting coal through the Port of Brisbane in 1983) and the Swanbank power station, though with the recent conversion of the power station to burn natural gas, the line now sees little traffic.

The line has since become the home of the Queensland Pioneer Steam Railway, a heritage organisation, operating out of a depot at Box Flat, between two stations on the line, Racecourse and Swanbank.
