= Kilrie =

Type and origin
- Power type: Steam
- Builder: Perry Engineering
- Serial number: 265
- Build date: November 1924
Specifications
- Configuration
  - Whyte: New: 0-4-0T; 1960: 0-4-2T
- Gauge: 1,067 mm (3 ft 6 in)
- Driver dia.: 28 1/2 in (724 mm)
- Boiler pressure: 150 lbf/in^{2} (1.034 MPa)
- Cylinders: Two
- Cylinder size: 10 in × 24 in (254 mm × 610 mm)
- Valve gear: Walschaerts

Kilrie is a railway locomotive, built in South Australia.

Built by Perry Engineering of Gawler (S/N 265) in November 1924 this tiny locomotive was one of twelve similar units purchased by the State Rivers & Water Supply Commission of Victoria for use on the construction of the Hume Weir on the Murray River near Albury. Its driving wheels are 28.5 inch (724mm) diameter. These are driven by a boiler working at 150 pounds per square inch and two 10 inch (254mm) diameter by 24 inch (610mm) stroke cylinders actuated by Walschaerts valve gear. After use at the Hume Reservoir from 1925 to 1935, it was placed in storage until sold to the Pioneer Sugar Mill near Brandon, Queensland. It was converted from a 0-4-0T to its present 0-4-2T configuration during 1960 and at the same time converted to burn oil. Sold during 1978 to the Australian Narrow Gauge Preservation Society, who now operate the 2 ft (610 mm) narrow gauge Woodford Railway in Woodford, Kilrie was purchased by the 3 ft 6 in (1,067 mm) Queensland Pioneer Steam Railway on 27 April 2008. In its time at Swanbank it has been restored to proper working order, reconverted to coal burning and, for reasons of safety and train operation, has also been fitted with a Westinghouse automatic air braking system.
