= United Welsh Church, Blackstone =

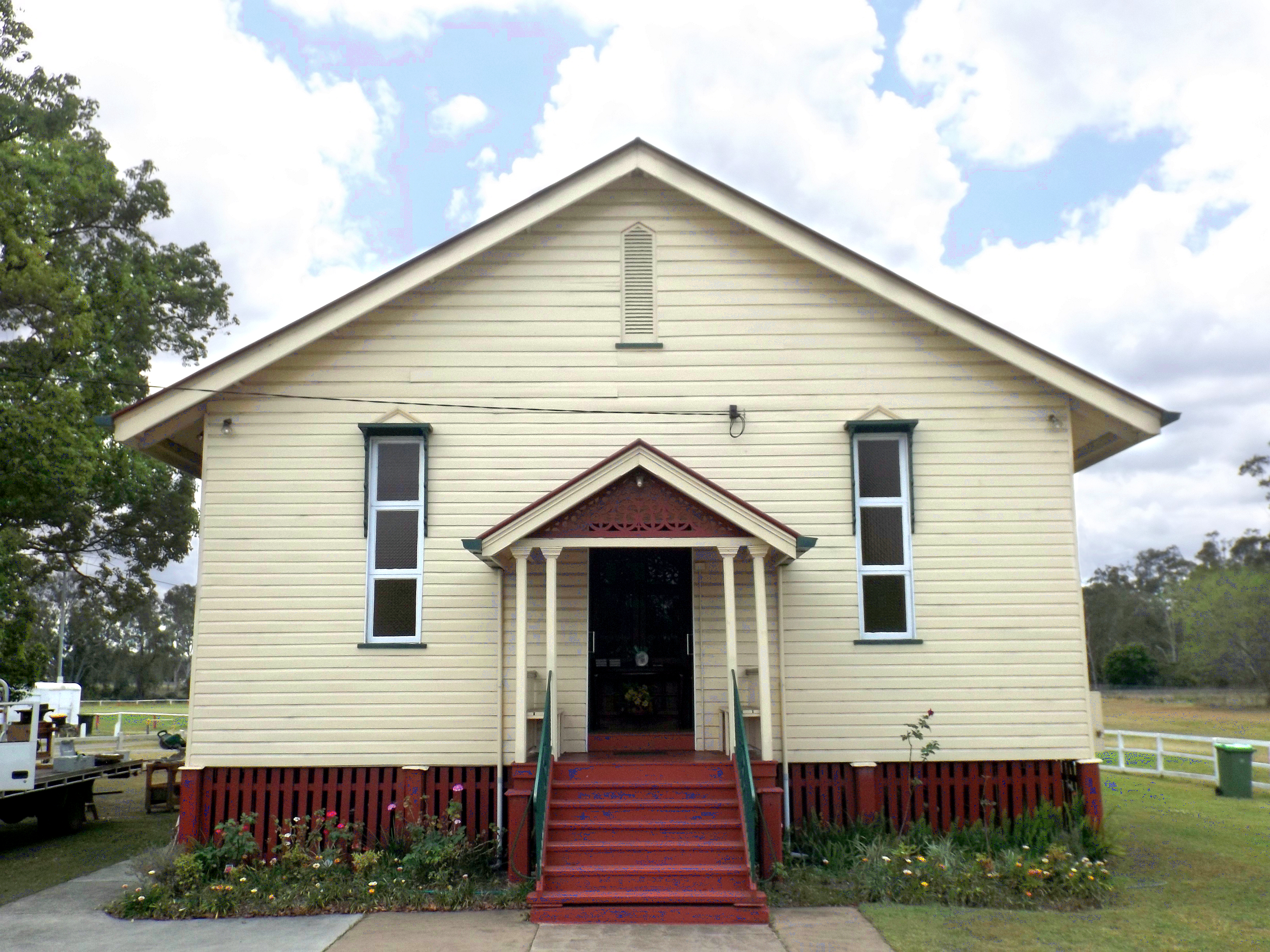
- Front of the building, 2015

- Location within Queensland Location within Australia
- 27.6234°S 152.7988°E
- Location: 6 Thomas Street, Blackstone, City of Ipswich, Queensland, Australia

History
- Design period: 1870s - 1890s (late 19th century)
- Built: 1886

Site notes
- Architect: Samuel Shenton

Queensland Heritage Register
- Official name: United Welsh Church, Blackstone, Welsh Chapel, Welsh Union Church
- Type: state heritage (built)
- Designated: 21 October 1992
- Reference no.: 600548
- Significant period: 1886 (fabric)
- Significant components: trees/plantings, memorial - honour board/ roll of honour, furniture/fittings, memorial - rock/stone/boulder, memorial - plaque
- Builders: Worley & Whitehead

United Welsh Church is a heritage-listed union church at 6 Thomas Street, Blackstone, City of Ipswich, Queensland, Australia. It was designed by Samuel Shenton and built in 1886 by Worley & Whitehead. It is also known as Welsh Chapel and Welsh Union Church. It was added to the Queensland Heritage Register on 21 October 1992.

== History ==
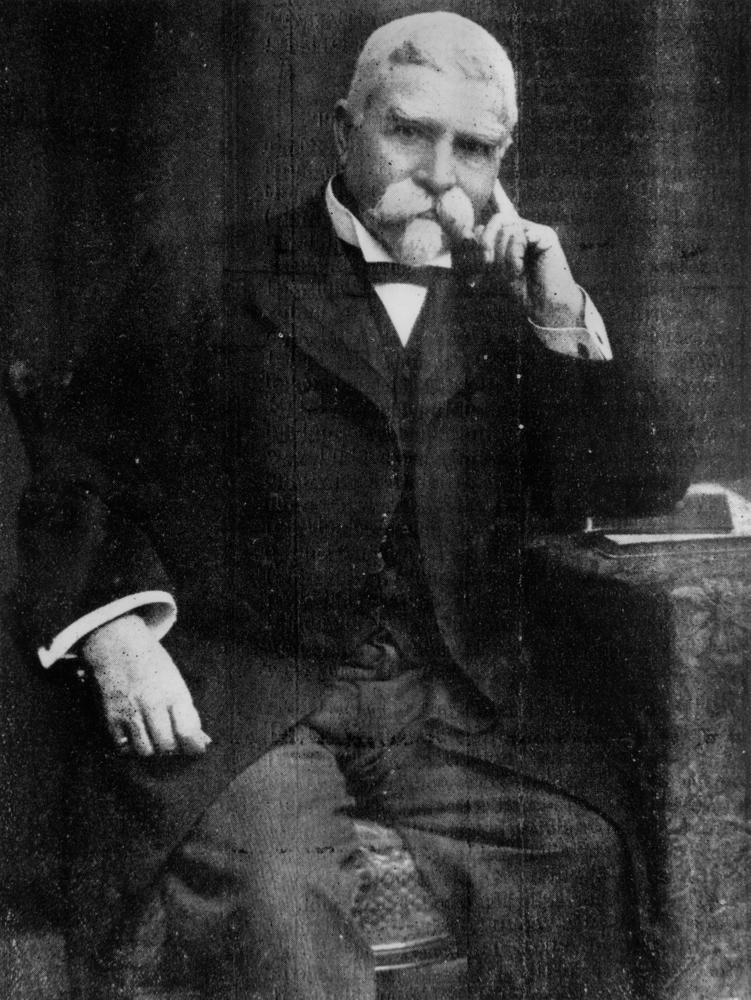
The Honourable Lewis Thomas M.L.C., who donated the land for the church

The United Welsh Church was built in 1886; it was designed by Ipswich builder/architect Samuel Shenton and constructed by Ipswich contractors Worley and Whitehead. The land was donated by coal-mine owner Lewis Thomas who also helped finance the church.

Lewis Thomas had begun to mine coal at Blackstone in the 1860s. In 1883, a group of Welsh people, formerly slate miners from Blaenau Ffestiniog, arrived in Blackstone to work for Thomas. Shortly after their arrival, they held a Protestant church service under a mulberry tree on the banks of Bundamba Creek. They agreed that Welsh nationality took priority over minor sectarian differences and formed a Welsh union church. The first combined service was held in a church hall in the nearby suburb of Newtown on 19 July 1883. Lewis Thomas then allowed use of a cottage in Blackstone for services. As the number of Welsh immigrants grew, this became too small and Thomas donated land for a church. The church building opened officially on 16 October 1886 with a tea-meeting and concert.

Early undated photographs show the church with exposed stud frame external walls; the walls are now chamferboard. It is not known when this work was carried out but it was at least by the 1930s. The building was painted and new seats were made in 1892, the work supervised by architect George Brockwell Gill who had taken over Shenton's practice. The toilets on the northern side were built c. 1975. The front windows, originally louvred, have been replaced with glass. The church was inundated to the level of the top windows in the 1893 flood, destroying the organ and early church records, and to a few centimetres above floor level in the 1974 flood.

A number of historic photographs, memorials and memorabilia have been placed on display in the main body of the church and in the rear meeting room. A war memorial honour board was installed in 1917 and a plaque was installed in 1986 to honour the centenary of the Cambrian Choir. A pair of glass and cedar doors bearing the name "Brynhyfryd" etched in the glass were installed as a screen inside the entry following the demolition of Lewis Thomas' mansion Brynhyfryd in the 1930s. A cedar fireplace surround from the mansion has been converted into a combined Welsh pioneers/World War II memorial. Leadlight windows depicting Welsh dragons were presented by the St David Society c. 1985.

The church was known as the Welsh Union Church in the early years but was being called the United Welsh Church by the early 20th century. The church has been controlled by trustees but is currently (1997) in the process of becoming incorporated. In the early years, a full-time minister was appointed but a part-time minister now conducts a weekly service.

The church has been a centre for community social life with activities including church teas, clubs, eisteddfodau and hymn festivals. Early church services were held in Welsh, and in the present day, some hymns are still sung in a mixture of Welsh and English, while Sunday School children are taught a few words of Welsh. The first Gymanfa Ganu (hymn festival) was held in 1902 and is still a biennial event.

An eisteddfod (a traditional music, literary and speaking competition) was held in the church on New Year's Day, 1887, a few months after the church was opened. A local choir was formed to contest this eisteddfod and is still operating as the Blackstone-Ipswich Cambrian Choir. Subsequent eisteddfodau were held in the church or in the Ipswich School of Arts as interest in the eisteddfod movement grew. In 1888, a Brisbane choir entered the competition and a Brisbane eisteddfod was then held in 1889. These inter-city competitions eventually grew to become the Queensland Eisteddfod, still contested every Easter. A junior eisteddfod and a Silkstone Eisteddfod are still held annually in Ipswich.

This is the only Welsh Church in Queensland and it is thought that there are only three others in Australia - in Sydney, Melbourne and Western Australia.

== Description ==
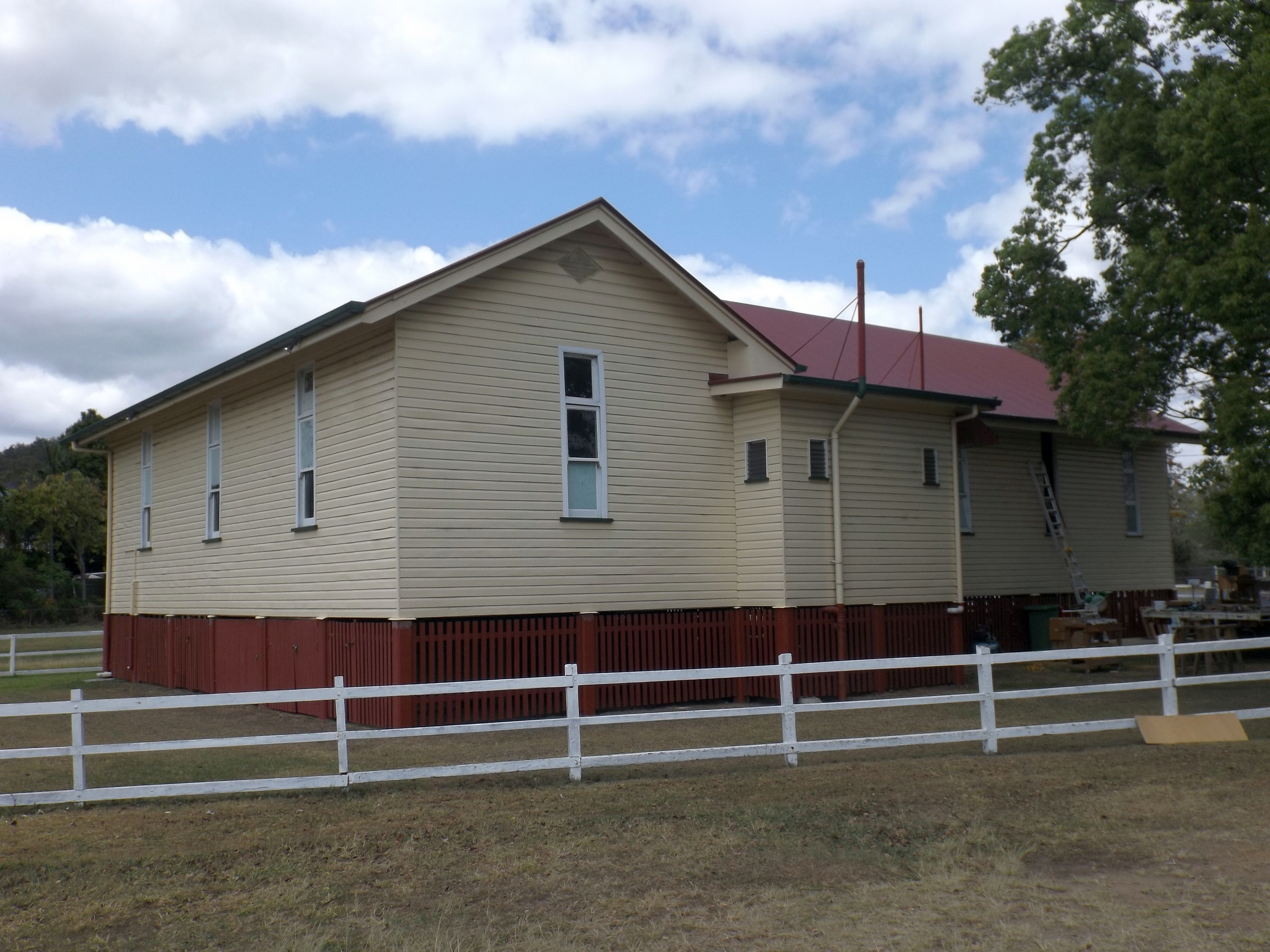
Back of the building, 2015

This modest timber church has a rectangular nave and sanctuary with rear vestry forming a simple "T" plan form. A contemporary skillion-roofed toilet block is constructed on the northern side.

Walls are of timber stud frame, now clad in chamferboard; the timber floor is supported on concrete stumps and the comparatively low-pitched gable roof is clad in corrugated galvanised iron. A front entrance porch with separate gable roof has a decorative fretwork pediment infill. Above the porch is a centrally-placed timber fixed ventilator window with a pointed head. The balustrading to the front steps is wrought iron.

The side windows of the church are pivoting timber casements. The front windows are framed externally in unusual projecting decorative timber hoods.

The interior feature some fine cedar joinery in the sanctuary area and liturgical fitments including a silky oak minister's chair. The timber pews have decorative ends bearing pew numbers. A pair of leadlight windows featuring the Welsh dragon are above the doors in the rear wall leading into the vestry/meeting room. The walls display several timber plaques and memorials.

A continuous open-fretwork ventilator runs the full length of the nave walls immediately below the roof springing point. The ceiling is boarded and has iron tie-rod roof trusses.

The rear vestry/meeting room is a large rectangular room with framed photographs and other memorabilia decorating the walls.

The grounds contain a very large camphor laurel tree on the northern side and two rock monuments, one bearing a centenary plaque and one a piece of rock from the site of the mansion "Brynhyfryd".

== Heritage listing ==
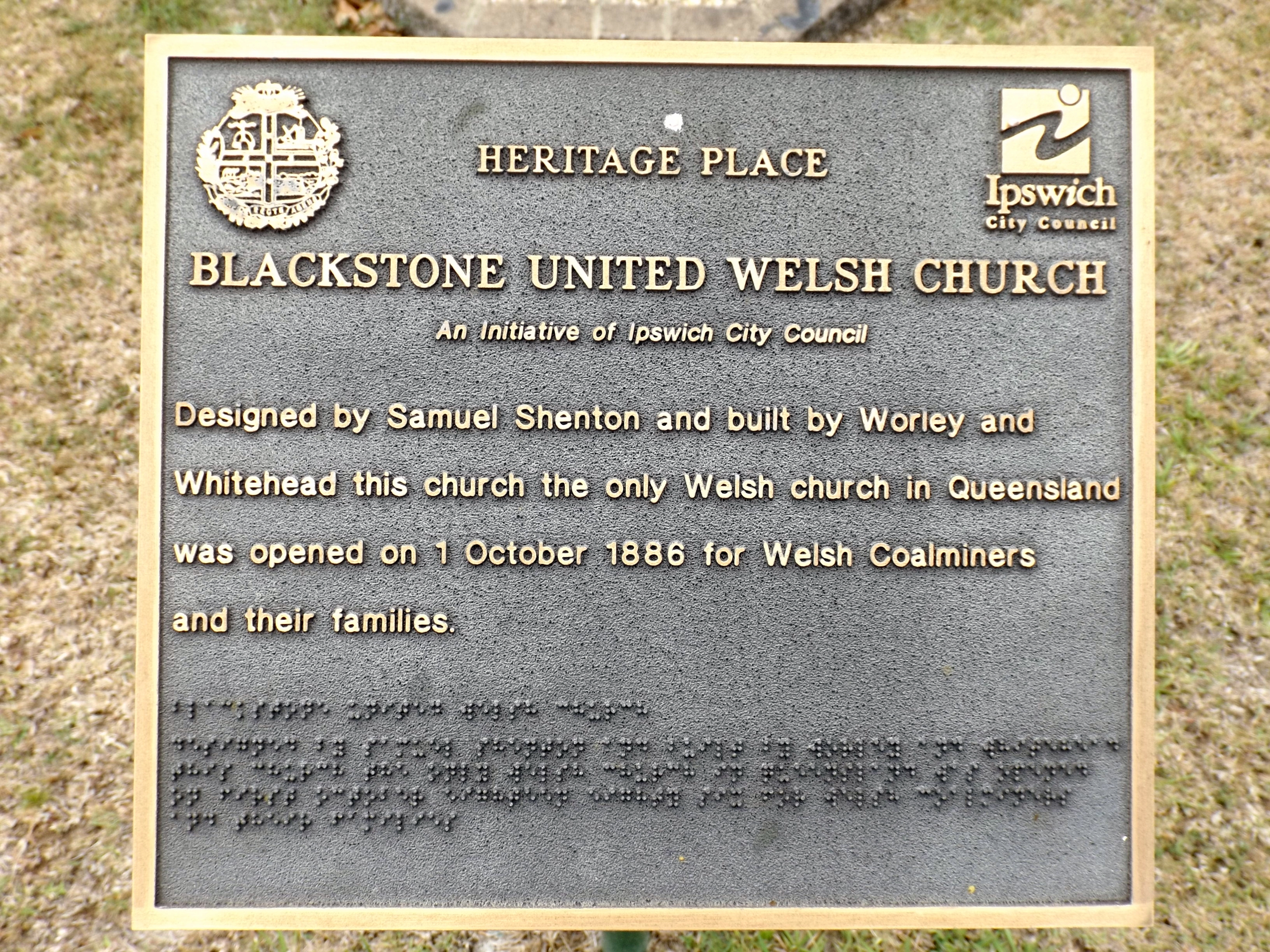
Site plaque, 2015

United Welsh Church, Blackstone was listed on the Queensland Heritage Register on 21 October 1992 having satisfied the following criteria.

The place is important in demonstrating the evolution or pattern of Queensland's history.

Built in 1886, the United Welsh Church is important in demonstrating the pattern of Queensland's history, in particular the pattern of immigration of Welsh families to coalmining areas in Queensland in the 1880s and the subsequent introduction of Welsh customs such as the Eisteddfod which remain part of Queensland cultural life.

The place demonstrates rare, uncommon or endangered aspects of Queensland's cultural heritage.

The church is the only Welsh Church in Queensland and appears to be one of only four in Australia.

The place has potential to yield information that will contribute to an understanding of Queensland's history.

The interior contains historic photographs, memorials, plaques and memorabilia and yields information about Welsh customs and culture maintained in an Australian context.

The place is important in demonstrating the principal characteristics of a particular class of cultural places.

The simple traditional form of the exterior and its associated large camphor laurel tree have landmark qualities near Bundamba Creek at the approach to the suburb of Blackstone.

The place is important because of its aesthetic significance.

The simple traditional form of the exterior and its associated large camphor laurel tree have landmark qualities near Bundamba Creek at the approach to the suburb of Blackstone.

The place has a strong or special association with a particular community or cultural group for social, cultural or spiritual reasons.

As a venue for church services, social events and eisteddfodau, the place has been closely associated with the social, cultural and spiritual life of Blackstone and of the wider Queensland community since 1886.

== Notable people ==
- T. Rees Thomas, Congregational minister attended this church in his youth
