= Silkstone, Queensland =

Silkstone
- Suburb
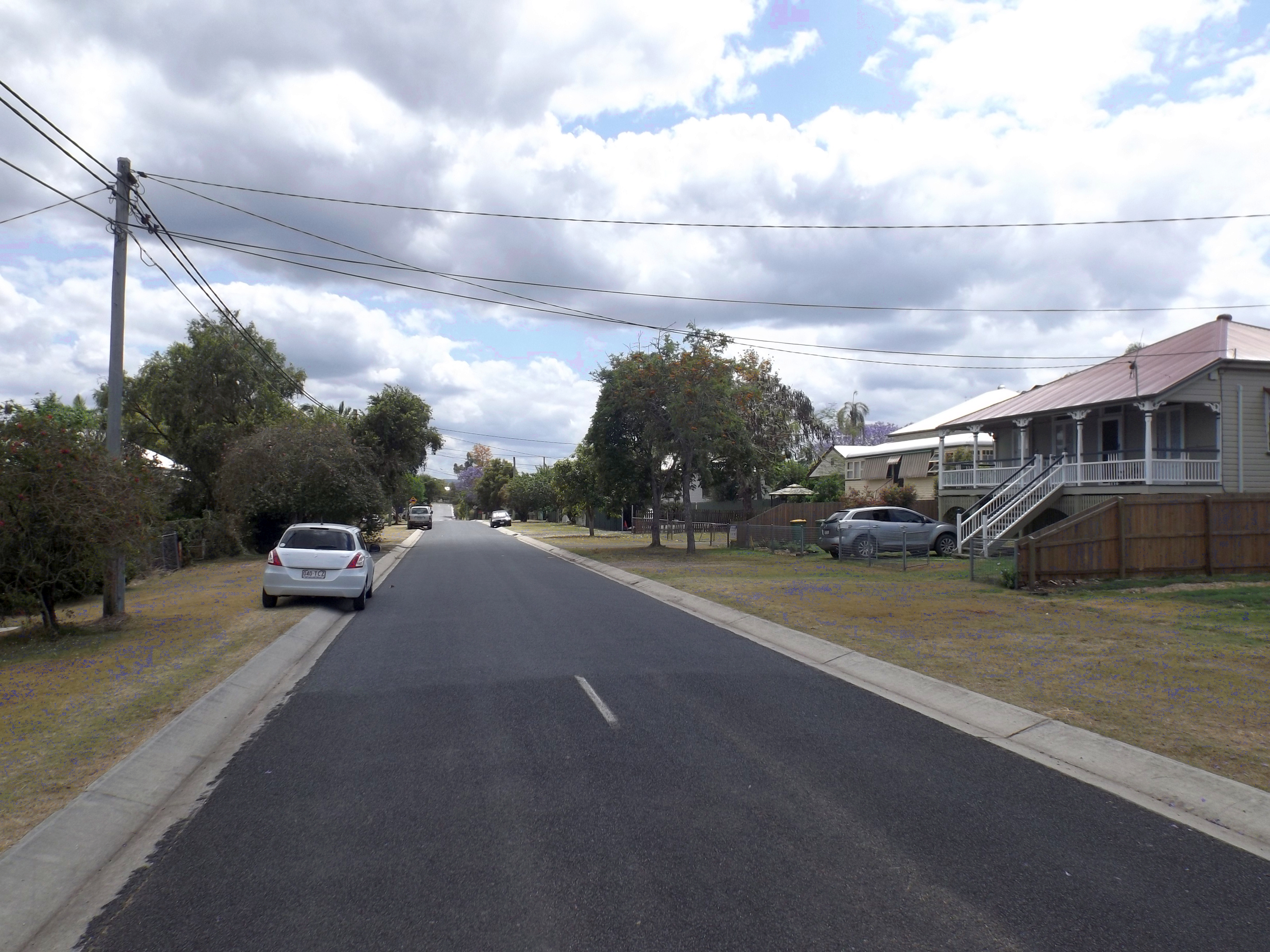
- Alice Street, 2015

- Coordinates: 27.6230°S 152.7900°E
- Country: Australia
- State: Queensland
- City: Ipswich
- LGA: City of Ipswich
- Location: 39 km (24 mi) from Brisbane; 3 km (1.9 mi) from Ipswich CBD

Government
  - State electorate: Ipswich
  - Federal division: Blair

Area
  - Total: 2.0 km^{2} (0.77 sq mi)

Population
  - Total: 3,830 (2021 census)
  - Density: 1,920/km^{2} (4,960/sq mi)
- Time zone: UTC+10:00 (AEST)
- Postcode: 4304
Suburbs around Silkstone
Newtown	Booval	Bundamba
Eastern Heights	Silkstone	Blackstone
Raceview	Raceview	Blackstone

Silkstone is a suburb in the City of Ipswich, Queensland, Australia. In the 2021 census, Silkstone had a population of 3,830 people.

== Geography ==
Bundamba Creek marks the eastern boundary of Silkstone.

== History ==
Newtown State School opened on 1 July 1882. In 1915 the school was moved to a new location and renamed Silkstone State School.

In December 1895 the Anglican Diocese's architect John Buckeridge called for tenders to erect the Church of All Saints in Bundanba (as Bundamba was then known) on land donated by Miss Ferrett and Mr Harry Ferrett. Bishop William Webber laid the foundation stone on Friday 24 January 1896. Bishop Webber opened and dedicated the new church on Saturday 16 May 1896. In April 1897 Harry Ferrett was married in the church. In 1913 the church building was moved by rolling it on beer barrels to Silkstone. In 1930 it was moved again on a flat-top lorry to its current location in Booval. A new church hall for All Saints' Anglican Church was opened in Booval on Sunday 10 May 1930. The second All Saints' Anglican Church was dedicated in Booval in 1983.

In 1912, a Baptist Church opened in Silkstone on the main Blackstone-Ipswich Road (now 169 Blackstone Road, 27.6220°S 152.7901°E). Tenders to erect the church were called for in May 1912. The stump-capping ceremony took place on Saturday 2 August 1912. The church opened on Saturday 30 November 1912. In August 1928 tenders were called to erect a new brick church building. The foundation stone was laid on Saturday 3 November 1928. The new church was erected to the east of the existing church and officially opened on Saturday 2 March 1929. Modern brick front facades were added to both buildings sometime after the 1950s.

Bremer State High School opened 26 January 1959 at 73 Blackstone Road (27.620825°S 152.780042°E). In 2011, the school relocated to a new site at 133-153 Warwick Road, Ipswich.

== Demographics ==
In the 2016 census, Silkstone had a population of 3,480 people.

In the 2021 census, Silkstone had a population of 3,830 people.

== Heritage listings ==
Heritage-listed sites in Silkstone include:

- Molloy Street (27.6190°S 152.7841°E): Silkstone State School

== Education ==
Silkstone State School is a government primary (Prep-6) school for boys and girls at Molloy Street (27.6190°S 152.7847°E). In 2017, the school had an enrolment of 828 students with 64 teachers (59 full-time equivalent) and 35 non-teaching staff (25 full-time equivalent). It includes a special education program.

Claremont Special School is a special primary and secondary (Prep-12) school for boys and girls at 136a Robertson Road (27.6295°S 152.7876°E). In 2017, the school had an enrolment of 144 students with 44 teachers (34 full-time equivalent) and 43 non-teaching staff (31 full-time equivalent).
