= Swanbank, Queensland =

Locality in Queensland, Australia

Swanbank
- Suburb
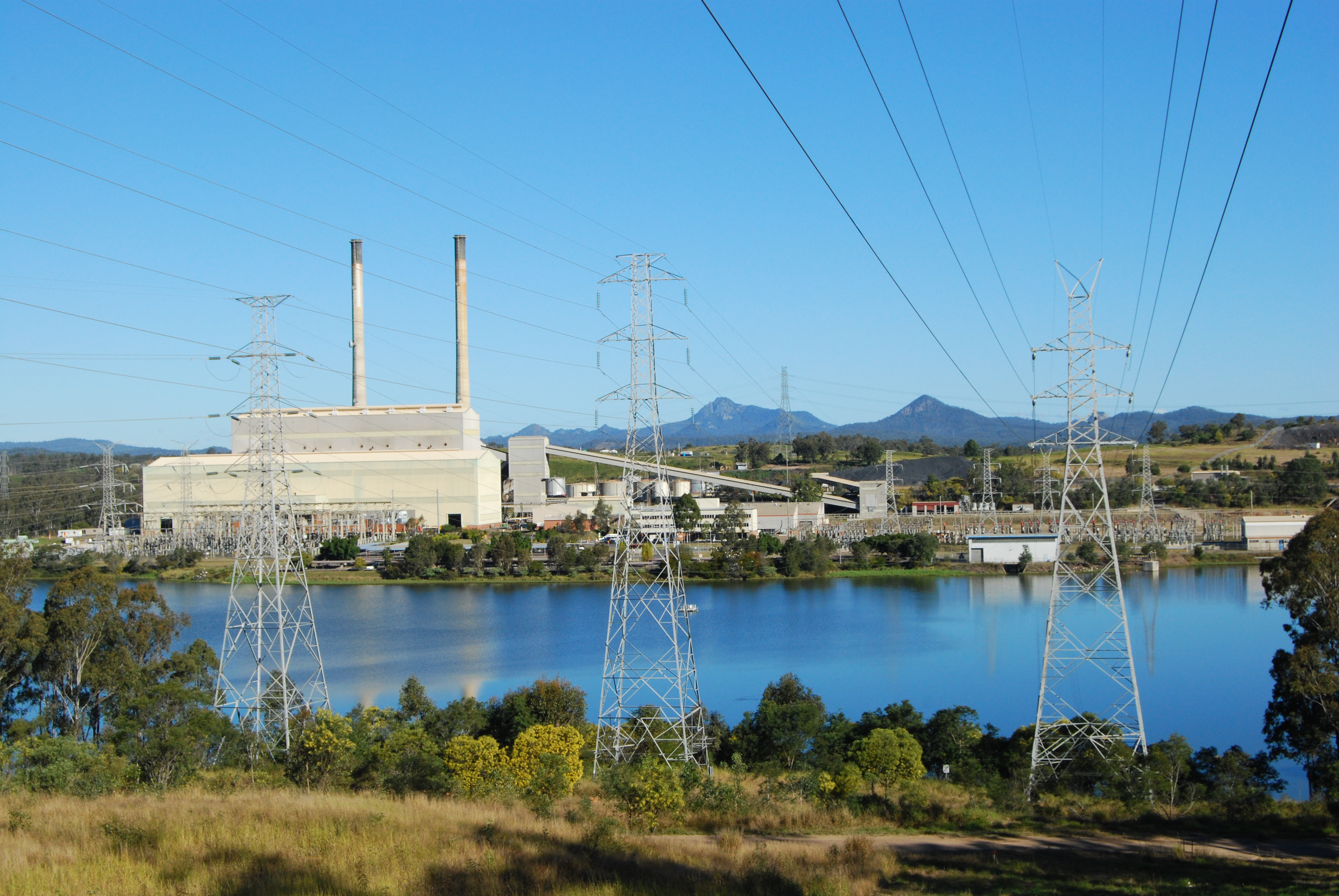
- Swanbank Power Station, 2009

- Interactive map of Swanbank
- Coordinates: 27.6597°S 152.8188°E
- Country: Australia
- State: Queensland
- City: Ipswich
- LGA: City of Ipswich
- Location: 10.3 km (6.4 mi) SE of Ipswich CBD; 43.1 km (26.8 mi) SW of Brisbane CBD

Government
  - State electorate: Bundamba
  - Federal division: Blair

Area
  - Total: 18.8 km^{2} (7.3 sq mi)

Population
  - Total: 0 (2021 census)
  - Density: 0.000/km^{2} (0.00/sq mi)
- Time zone: UTC+10:00 (AEST)
- Postcode: 4306
Suburbs around Swanbank
Raceview	Blackstone	Redbank Plains
Flinders View	Swanbank	White Rock
Ripley	South Ripley	South Ripley

Swanbank is an industrial locality in the City of Ipswich, Queensland, Australia. In the 2021 census, Swanbank had "no people or a very low population".

== Geography ==
The predominant land usage in Swanbank is industrial, including the Swanbank Power Station (27.6598°S 152.8134°E). There are both current and historic mines in the area. The south-west of the locality is used for grazing on native vegetation.

The Swanbank railway line enters the locality from the north (Blackstone) and terminates in two balloon loops. There are two railway stations:

- Swanbank railway station (27.6539°S 152.8147°E)
- Box Flat railway station (27.6442°S 152.8049°E)

== History ==
Early settler James Foote named the locality after his wife's birthplace Swanbank in Lanarkshire, Scotland. Previous names for this area were Logan Lagoon and Josey's Lagoon.

On 31 July 1972, the Box Flat Mine experienced an explosion which took the lives of 18 men and led to the closure of the mine.

== Demographics ==
In the 2016 census, Swanbank had "no people or a very low population".

In the 2021 census, Swanbank had "no people or a very low population".

== Heritage ==
Swanbank railway station is used by a heritage and railway preservation society. The heritage train trips are operated by Queensland Pioneer Steam Railway who have steam train rides around Swanbank rail loop which was used to service the coal needs of Swanbank power station.
