= Blackstone, Queensland =

Blackstone
- Suburb
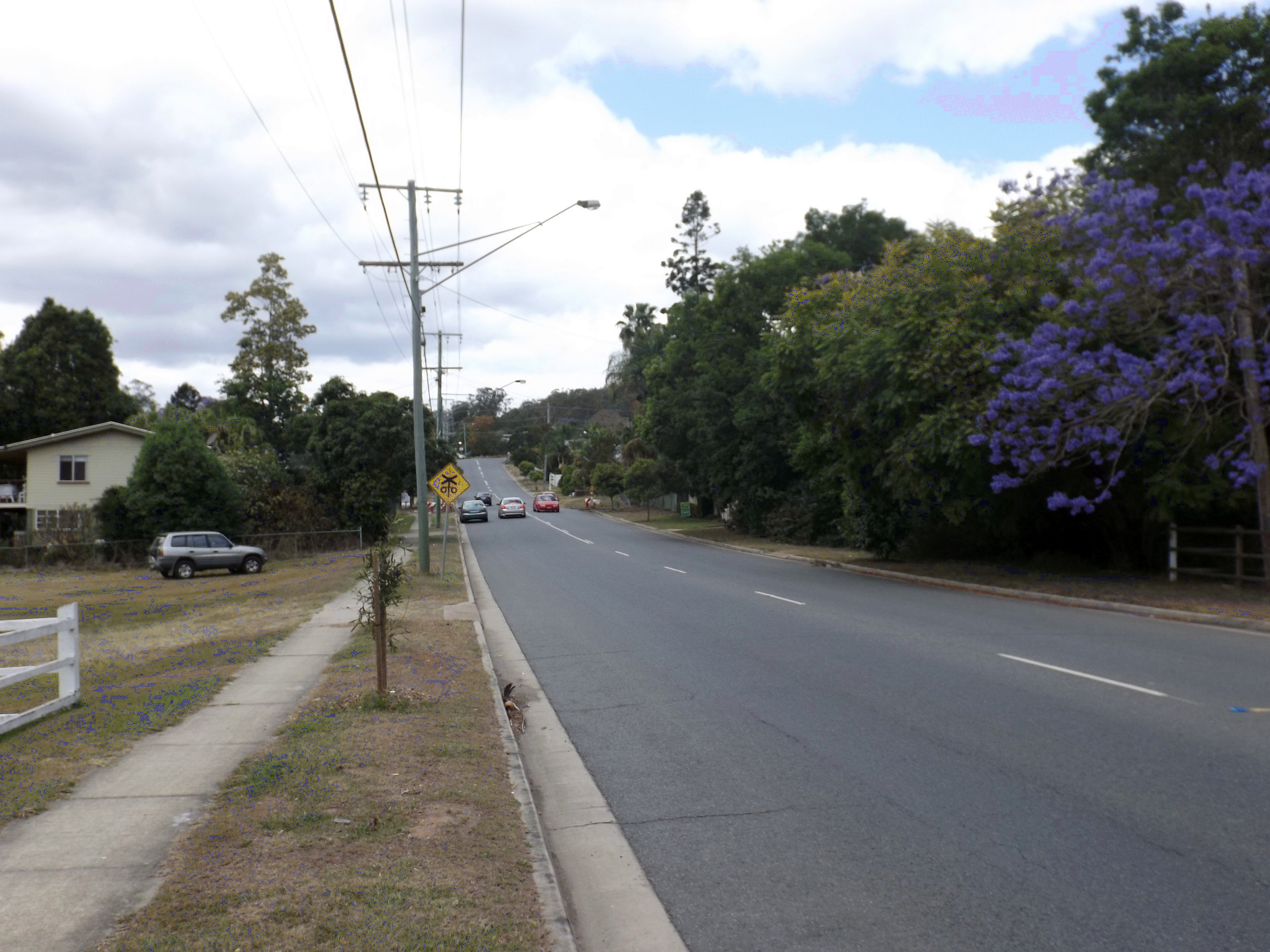
- Thomas Street, 2015

- Interactive map of Blackstone
- Coordinates: 27.6297°S 152.8030°E
- Country: Australia
- State: Queensland
- City: Ipswich
- LGA: City of Ipswich
- Location: 5.4 km (3.4 mi) WNW of Ipswich CBD; 37.2 km (23.1 mi) SW of Brisbane CBD

Government
  - State electorate: Bundamba
  - Federal division: Blair

Area
  - Total: 3.8 km^{2} (1.5 sq mi)

Population
  - Total: 1,144 (2021 census)
  - Density: 301/km^{2} (780/sq mi)
- Time zone: UTC+10:00 (AEST)
- Postcode: 4304
Suburbs around Blackstone
Silkstone	Bundamba	New Chum
Raceview	Blackstone	New Chum
Raceview	Swanbank	Swanbank

Blackstone is a suburb of Ipswich in the City of Ipswich, Queensland, Australia. In the 2021 census, Blackstone had a population of 1,144 people.

== History ==
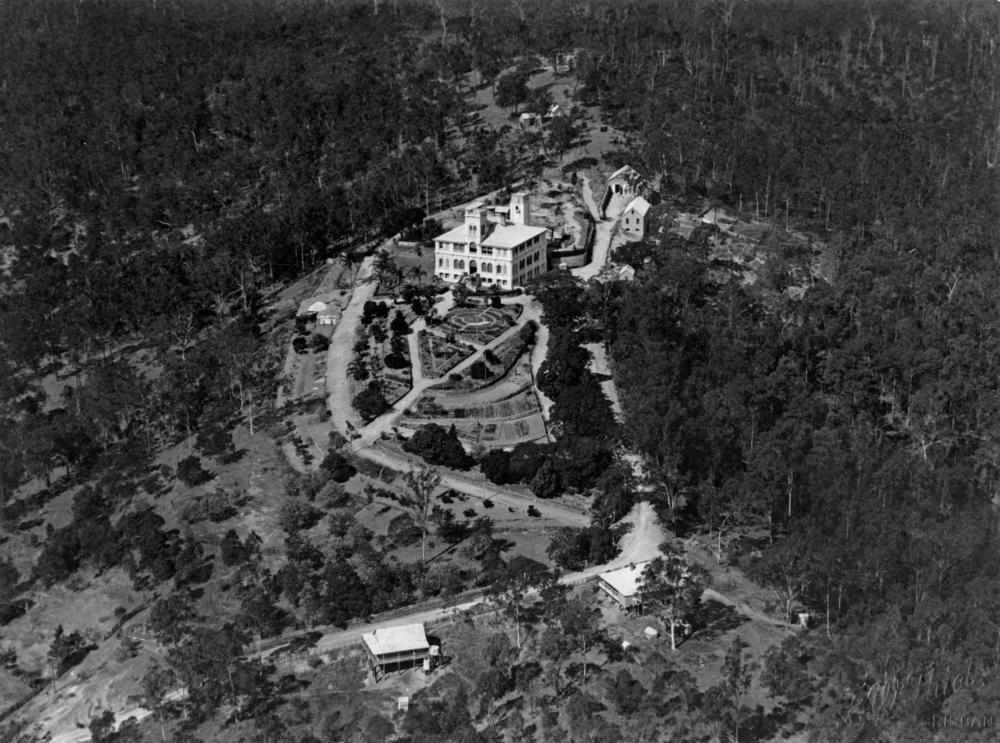
Brynhyfryd mansion, Blackstone (demolished 1937)

The district was originally called Bundamba Creek but this caused confusion with nearby Bundamba, so the postmistress Mrs Victoria Orr (nee Chantrill), second wife of pioneer engineer, Mr James Brown Orr, proposed the name Blackstone, believed to be a place in Ireland.

The area is renowned for its mining history and in 1866 Welshman Lewis Thomas established one of the first mines in the area. Blackstone has a rich Welsh history with Lewis Thomas having populated the community with Welsh miners and their families, who in turn established their own Cambrian choir and church in 1886, a School of Arts in 1891, a Soccer club in 1890, and public school in 1887.

After switching to mining at Dinmore in 1870, Thomas returned to open his first Aberdare Mine in 1876 and prospered thereafter. In 1881 the government granted him permission to build a private railway which developed by 1903 into a loop line connecting the mines from:

- Bundamba to Redbank:
- Blackheath
- Box Flat
- Fairbank
- Aberdare
- Bogside
- No 2, Mafeking
- Denham
- Swanbank
- Bonnie Dundee
- Rhondda
- Whitwood
- New Chum.

Blackstone Congregational Church was established in 1879 and was designed by architect Will Haenke. The church originally faced Thomas Street, but circa 1900 a new church building was constructed to face Mary Street with the original building being retained as a hall. In December 2007 the Samoan Methodist Church purchased the church with Samoan-language services being conducted from 27 January 2008.

Blackstone State School opened on 17 January 1887 and closed on 31 December 2009. The school was at 14 Hill Street (27.626°S 152.804°E). The school's website was archived.

At some time after 1980, Bundamba Uniting Church and Blackstone Uniting Church joined Trinity Uniting Church in North Booval which was then renamed Trinity Ipswich Uniting Church.

== Demographics ==
In the 2011 census, Blackstone had a population of 1,017 people.

In the 2016 census, Blackstone had a population of 1,024 people.

In the 2021 census, Blackstone had a population of 1,144 people.

== Heritage listings ==
Blackstone has a number of heritage-listed sites, including:

- 6 Thomas Street: United Welsh Church, Blackstone
- 14 Mary Street: Blackstone Congregational Church, Blackstone
- 20 Thomas Street: Cambrian House, Blackstone
- 16 Hill Street: Blackstone State School, Blackstone

== Education ==
There are no schools in Blackstone. The nearest primary schools are in neighbouring Silkstone, Raceview and Bundamba. The nearest secondary schools are in Bundamba and Ipswich CBD (Bremer State High School).

== Amenities ==
Samoan Methodist Church is at 14 Mary Street (corner Thomas Street, 27.6253°S 152.8004°E). The original church entrance can be seen from Thomas Street, while the later church entrance can be seen from Mary Street.
