= Swanbank Power Station =

Power station complex in Queensland, Australia

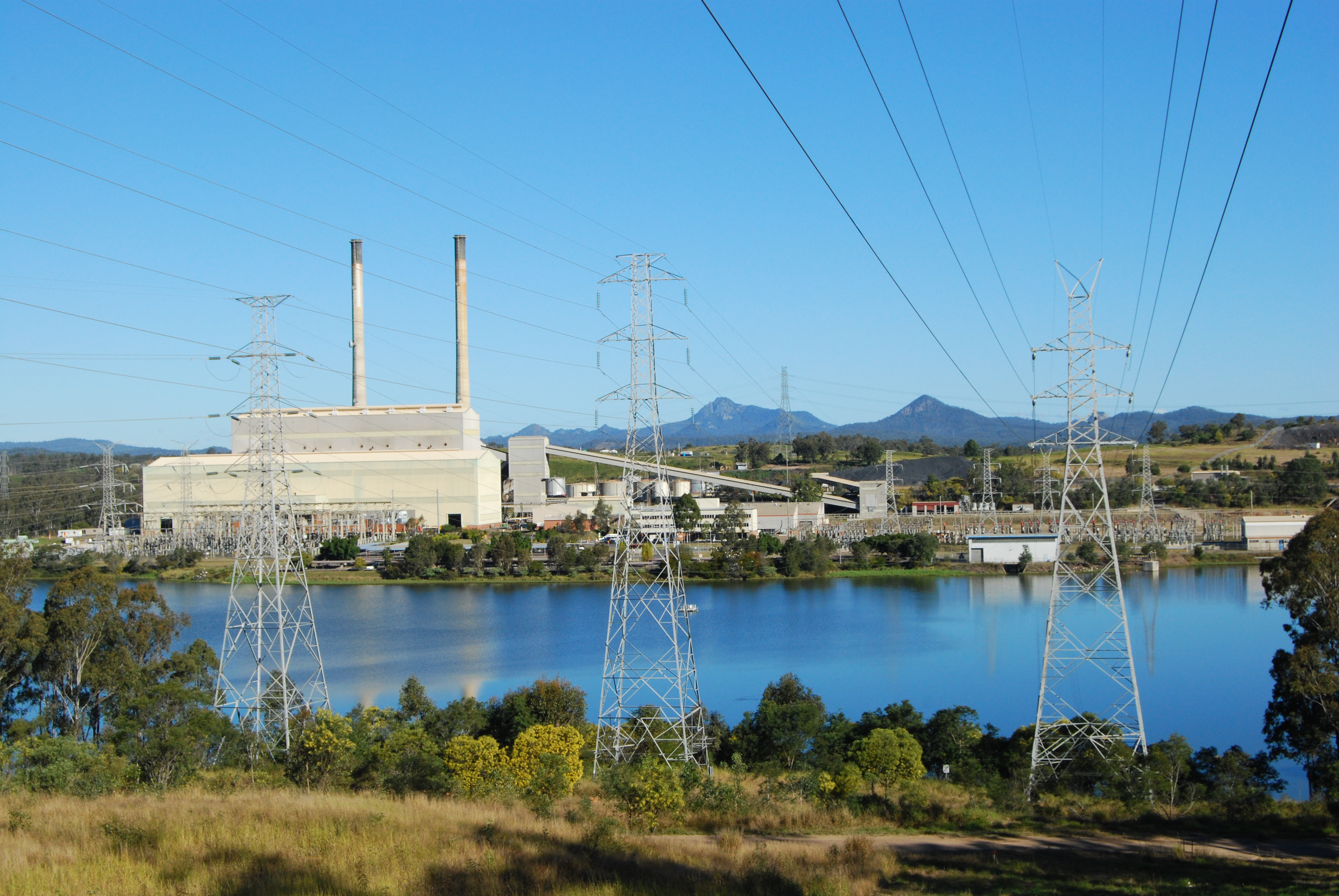
- Swanbank Power Station
- Country: Australia
- Location: Ipswich, Queensland
- Coordinates: 27.659783°S 152.813446°E
- Status: Operational
- Commission date: 1967 (Swanbank A); 1971 (Swanbank B); 1969 (Swanbank C); 2000 (Swanbank D); 2002 (Swanbank E)
- Decommission date: 2005 (Swanbank A); 2012 (Swanbank B); 2002 (Swanbank C); 2004 (Swanbank D)
- Owner: CleanCo Queensland

Thermal power station
- Primary fuel: Natural gas
- Secondary fuel: Landfill gas
- Combined cycle?: Yes

Power generation
- Units operational: 385 MW (Swanbank E)
- Make and model: Alstom GT26 (Swanbank E)
- Nameplate capacity: 385 MW

External links
- Commons: Related media on Commons

The Swanbank Power Stations are located in Swanbank within South East Queensland, Australia. The original power station was coal fired, but the site has since moved to gas. By 2007 the site had consisted of the highly efficient 385 megawatts (516,000 hp) gas-fired Swanbank E Power Station and the smaller 28 megawatts (38,000 hp) gas-fired Swanbank C Power Station. Swanbank E was written off by the Queensland Audit Office as having no value, as it is uneconomical to run in 2021.

== Components ==
Swanbank A was commissioned in 1967 and decommissioned in August 2005. It had six 66 megawatts (89,000 hp) steam turbines, and was powered by coal. The three 133-metre (436 ft) high, 7,000-tonne (6,900-long-ton; 7,700-short-ton) concrete smoke stacks were collapsed on 20 August 2006. All three were collapsed on the same day with a 10 second delay between each stack. The deconstruction and demolition project, undertaken by Trio Industries, was scheduled to be completed in February 2007.

Swanbank B was commissioned in 1971 with four 120 megawatts (160,000 hp) steam turbines, powered by coal. Four units of Swanbank B were decommissioned in April 2010, June 2010, 2011, and May 2012, due to the plant reaching the end of its operational life. The coal for Swanbank B came from coalfields in South-East Queensland, including New Acland Mine, by road. Water is supplied from Lake Moogerah and the Western Corridor Recycled Water Scheme began to supply the power station with water in August 2007.

Swanbank C was a small gas turbine generating plant, rated at 28 megawatts (38,000 hp). It had two Rolls-Royce Avon gas generators discharging into a power turbine which drove the generator. Middle Ridge Power Station was a similar design, with four gas generators discharging into two power turbines, one on each end of the 56 megawatts (75,000 hp) electrical generator. It was commissioned in 1969, and, in 2002, was expected to be decommissioned in December 2002.

Swanbank D was a small open cycle gas turbine. Delivering only 37 megawatts (50,000 hp), it was installed in 1999 but was sold by CS Energy in 2003/2004 and was decommissioned by 2004.

The much larger and more efficient Swanbank E was commissioned in 2002 with a single 385 megawatts (516,000 hp) combined cycle gas turbine. The gas turbine of Swanbank E was the largest of its type at the time of its commissioning. In 2011, Swanbank E set a world record for the continuous operation of an Alstom GT26 gas turbine. It had been running for 254 days when it was shut down on 9 July 2011 for planned maintenance.

In 2021, its owner, CleanCo Queensland, wrote down the entire value of the power station to zero, and expects to receive net losses until its expected retirement in 2036.

In February 2024, construction started for a 250 MW / 500 MWh grid battery at the B site, and commissioned in February 2026. A further 500 MW / 1000 MWh battery is planned.

== Protest ==
On 11 July 2008, four activists from Greenpeace Australia Pacific occupied the top of a 140-metre high Swanbank B smokestack for 33 hours. They descended over two hours on the next day, leaving a message for Australia's leaders – "Go Solar"- painted on the side of the smoke stack.

== See also ==
- List of active power stations in Queensland
