= Lewis Thomas (politician) =

Australian politician

The Hon Lewis Thomas
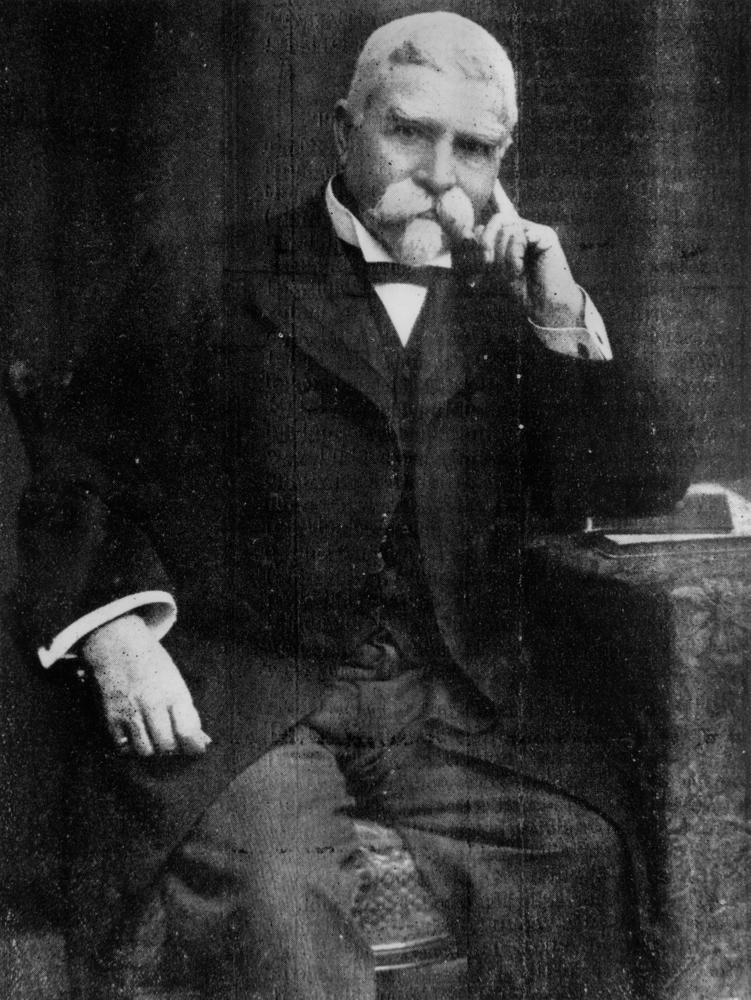

Member of the Queensland Legislative Assembly for Bundamba
- In office 13 May 1893 – 18 March 1899
- Preceded by: Thomas Glassey
- Succeeded by: James Cribb

Member of the Queensland Legislative Council
- In office 5 July 1902 – 16 February 1913

Personal details
- Born: Lewis Thomas; 20 November 1832 Llanfihangel Genau'r Glyn, Cardiganshire, Wales
- Died: 16 February 1913 (aged 80) Ipswich, Queensland, Australia
- Resting place: Ipswich General Cemetery
- Party: Ministerial
- Spouse: Anne Morris(m.1859 d.1930)
- Occupation: Gold miner, Colliery owner

Lewis Thomas (20 November 1832 – 16 February 1913) was a colliery owner and a member of both the Queensland Legislative Council and the Queensland Legislative Assembly.

== Early life ==
Thomas was born in November 1832 at Llanfihangel Genau'r Glyn, Cardiganshire, Wales to Thomas Thomas, carrier, and his wife Mary (née Hughes). At age nine he was working at a woollen factory and at fifteen was employed in the lead-mines of Esgair and Bwlch Gwyn. He moved on to working in the coal and iron mines of South Wales and in 1859 he set off to Australia.

Landing in Victoria, he worked as a gold miner but was unsuccessful and relocated to Queensland some two years later where he turned to coal mining in the West Moreton district. This time his venture was such a success that he opened up many of the coalfields in the area and with the building of railways across Queensland the demand for coal become even greater, earning him a vast fortune and eventually became known as the 'Coal King'. In 1890, Thomas retired from mining and handed over the business to his employees, who formed the Aberdare Co-Operative Coal Co. Ltd.

== Political career ==
Thomas, representing the Ministerial Party, was a candidate for the seat of Bundamba at the 1893 colonial election. He easily defeated the sitting member, Thomas Glassey, and remained as the member until he decided not to stand in the 1899 election.

Three years later, Thomas was appointed by premier Robert Philp to the Queensland Legislative Council, remaining there until his death in 1913.

== Personal life ==
In 1859, Thomas married Ann Morris at Llanfihangel Genau'r Glyn and together had 1 daughter, Mary, who grew up to marry Thomas Cribb Jr., the son of Thomas Bridson Cribb, the then Treasurer of Queensland. He had a great love of music, and for many years sponsored the annual Queensland Eisteddfodau, to which he gave between £60 and £100 to the chief choral contest. He was also patron of the Blackstone-Ipswich Cambria Choir and was often seen at the festivals in which they competed.

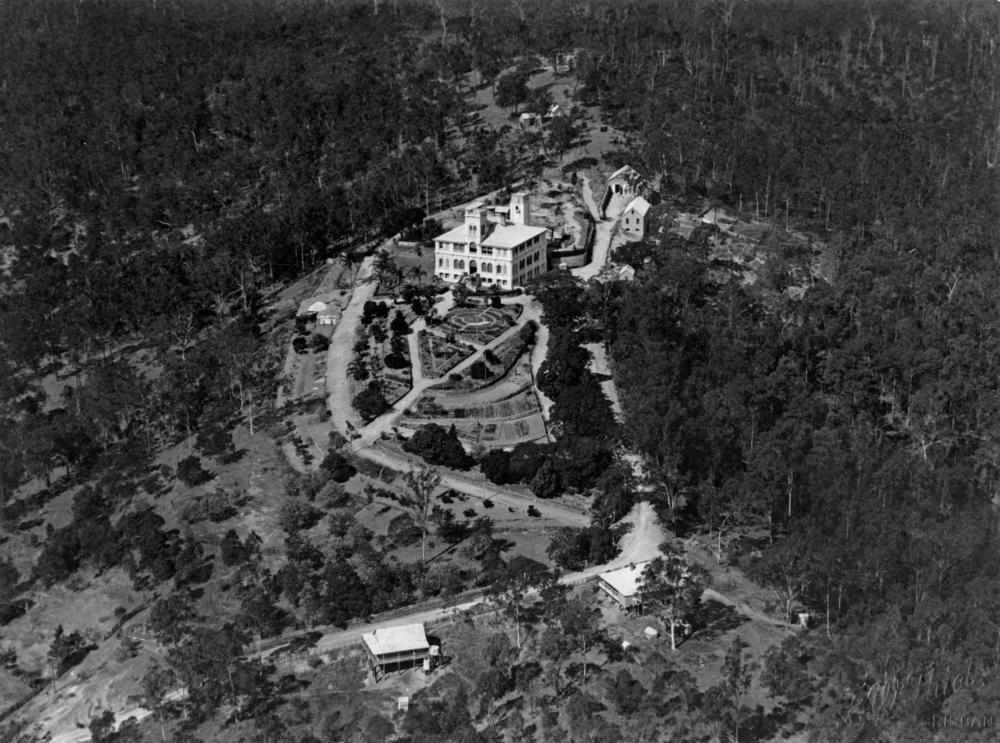
An aerial view of Brynhyfryd mansion at Blackstone, Ipswich, ca. 1930

Thomas was a trustee of the Ipswich Girls' Grammar School and also donated the annual 'Thomas Lewis Scholatship' to the boys Grammar School. Around 1905, Lewis was on a tour back to Wales, and while there he donated £1000 to establish a scholarship at the Aberystwyth University.

In 1890, Thomas built 'Brynhyfryd Mansion' at Blackstone. It was an elaborate home, three stories high and containing 49 rooms including a basement and a tower. It was built on top of a rich coal seam, and while Thomas was alive, refused to mine the coal as it would mean having to demolish his home.

== Later life ==
Thomas died in February 1913, and his funeral proceeded from his home in Blackstone to the Ipswich General Cemetery.

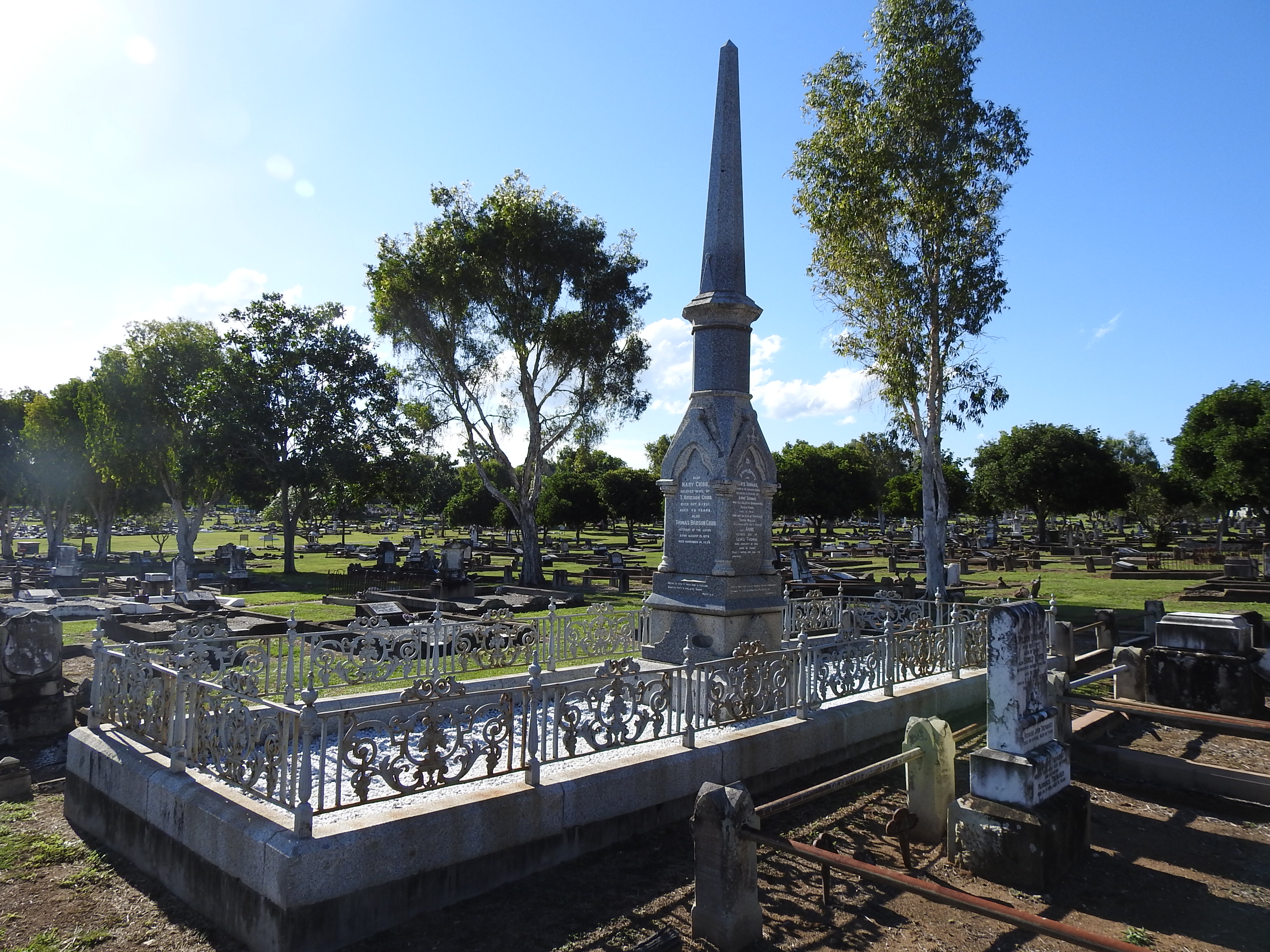
Family grave plot

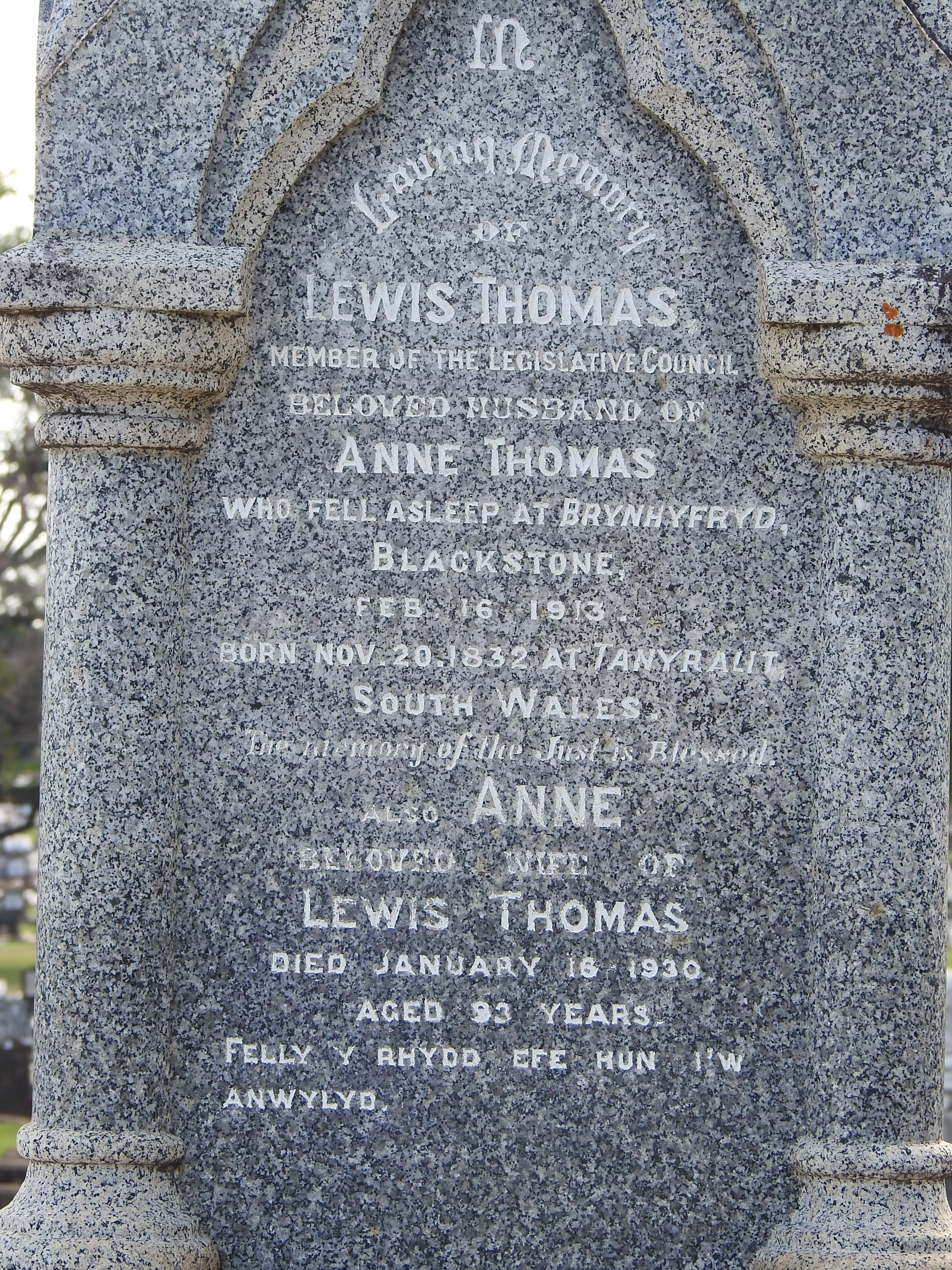
Monument face

After his death, his wife, daughter and her husband, continued to live in 'Brynhyfryd Mansion'. It was eventually sold in 1934 to Rylance Collieries and Brickworks who demolished the mansion in 1937 to mine the coal deposits below.

Parliament of Queensland
Preceded by Thomas Glassey	Member for Bundamba; 1893–1899	Succeeded by James Cribb
