= Ebbw Vale Memorial Park =

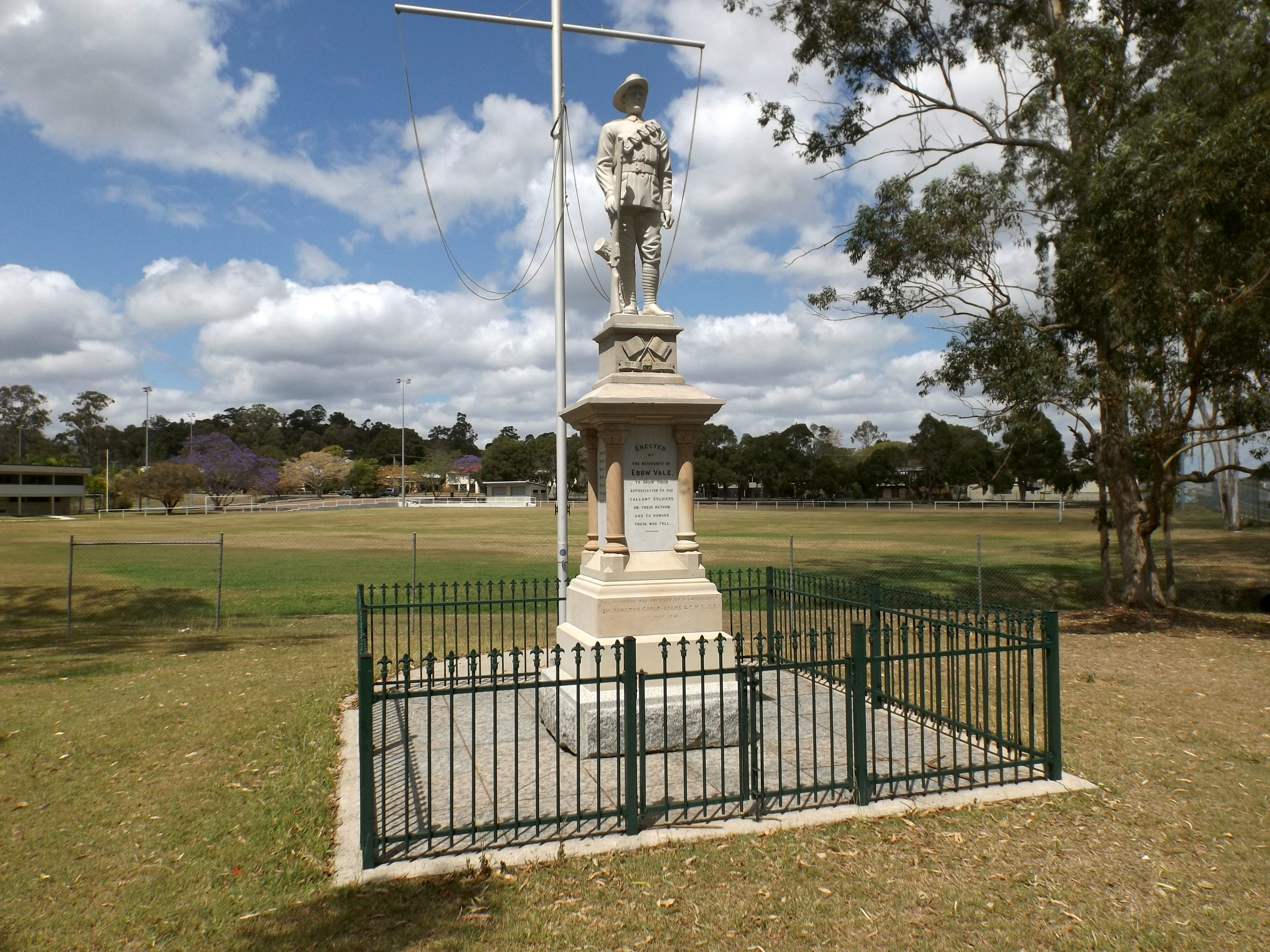
- War Memorial, 2015

- Location within Queensland Location within Australia
- 27.6056°S 152.8218°E
- Location: Brisbane Road, Ebbw Vale, City of Ipswich, Queensland, Australia

History
- Design period: 1870s - 1890s (late 19th century)
- Built: c. 1892 -

Queensland Heritage Register
- Official name: Ebbw Vale Memorial Park
- Type: state heritage (built)
- Designated: 17 May 2004
- Reference no.: 602433
- Significant period: c. 1892 -ongoing (fabric, historical use). 1912-1997 (historical, St Helens Soccer Club)
- Significant components: clubroom/s / clubhouse, sports field/oval/playing field, memorial - soldier statue, sports facilities

Ebbw Vale Memorial Park is a heritage-listed sports ground at Brisbane Road, Ebbw Vale, City of Ipswich, Queensland, Australia. It was built from c. 1892 onwards. It was added to the Queensland Heritage Register on 17 May 2004.

== History ==
Ebbw Vale Memorial Park was first known as the Whitwood ground, as in the early 1890s the owners of the Whitwood Colliery made the land available for their employees to use as a football ground. The colliery fielded two teams and soccer has been played at this venue ever since together with other sports.

Football in various forms is a very ancient game. It has been played in Britain since at least the Middle Ages, though there were few rules and these varied from one district to another. In 1815 the first written rules were drawn up and 1863 the Football Association was formed in Britain. At this time the two codes of Rugby and Association football were defined. In 1870 an 11 player team was agreed upon and regulations were further refined in the 1870s and 1880s.

The word "soccer" was coined from the abbreviation "assoc" (as opposed to the derivation of the term "rugger" from rugby) in the 1880s, though it was not in general use at that time.

This codification took place when many Britons were emigrating to Queensland and Ipswich drew miners from parts of England and Wales where football was very popular. Improvements to conditions and hours of work won by trade unions increased the leisure time of working people, including the gaining of a Saturday half day off, and this helped to promote team games like football.

In Queensland, the Anglo-Queensland Football Association was formed in Brisbane in May 1884, and regular matches were then held between the three foundation Brisbane teams. The Pineapple Hotel was used as headquarters of the Association and a team called the Pineapple Rangers was formed and played in the field behind the hotel, now used again for soccer games. The first soccer game played in Ipswich took place on the North Ipswich Reserve on 26 June 1886. Ipswich became officially involved with the Association from 1887. In 1889, the Association changed its name to the Queensland British Football Association. In the 1890s the game was well promoted and popular in Queensland; Maryborough and Rockhampton also having strong association football teams. Intercolonial matches were staged and in 1914 Brisbane hosted the second annual conference of the Commonwealth Football Association.

The land comprising Ebbw Vale Memorial Park was formed from Lot 227 acquired by William, Joseph, John and James Stafford in 1890 and an irregularly shaped strip of land, part of the adjoining lot 226, which was added to the block in 1892. The Stafford brothers owned the Whitwood Colliery, having sunk the Whitwood number 1 shaft near the end of Whitwood Road, Ebbw Vale in 1887. In 1899, number 2 shaft was sunk on the northern side of the Brisbane-Ipswich Railway line opposite Railway Street. The coal reserves in this area had previously been proven by driving a tunnel under the soccer field from the first shaft.

Several collieries had football teams formed by miners including Stafford brothers at Dinmore, Wright's at Tivoli and Lewis Thomas at Blackstone. The first soccer game at the Whitwood ground to receive press coverage was held on 5 July 1892, though it is clear that games had already been held there for some time. The home team at that game was a combination from the players of the Bush Rats, Dinmore and Whitwood teams. By 1893, the Whitwood ground was also being referred to as St Helen's as well and this name was later used for the football team itself. In 1909, when the nearby railway station opened, it was also called St Helens, before being renamed Ebbw Vale the following year. Ebbw Vale is a town in Wales and was the name of an early coal mine in the area.

In 1904 James Stafford left the colliery partnership and during 1911 all three of his brothers died. Johanna Stafford, widow of Joseph, took over the running of the business, though rising costs and a falling market affected profits. By 1917 she was in partnership with her brother in law, Richard Darker and his son, Walter. Around this time, members of the St Helen's Club, officially formed in 1912, were raising money locally with the intention of purchasing the ground, already referred to in 1915 by The Queensland Times as "the famous old Whitwood ground". This did not eventuate and in 1924, the Moreton Shire Council acquired the land, although the mining rights below 70 feet (21 m) continued with the colliery.

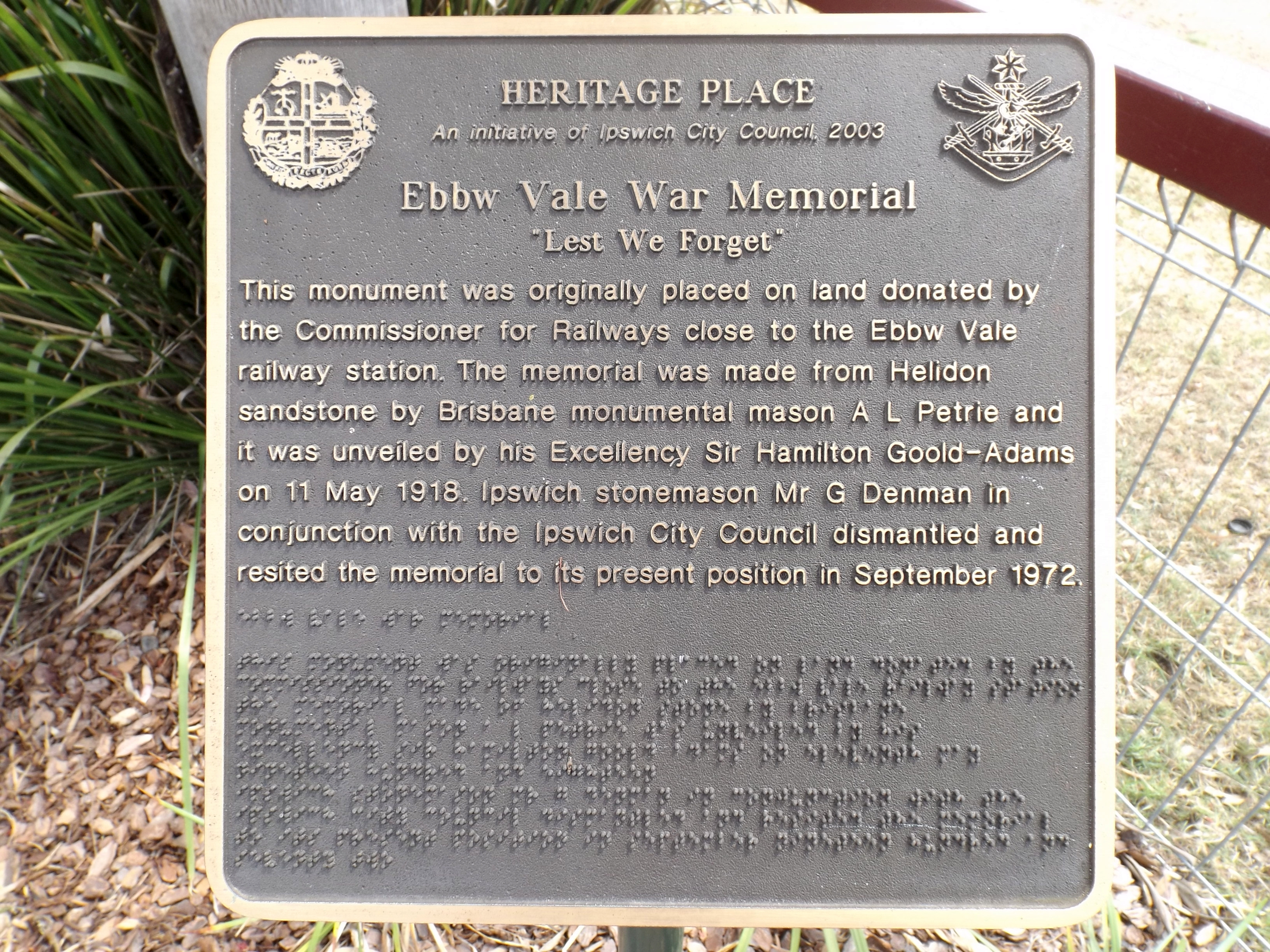
Ipswich City Council plaque, 2015

Responsibility for running and maintaining the field was originally in the care of "trustees" from the local community and it continued to be cared for by volunteer effort, in some cases over three or four generations of the same families. The players are said to have originally used a stand of trees on the ground for changing and then the verandah of Stan McCrea's house nearby.

In the 1940s, team sports suffered as players were called up for the defence forces, but St Helen's organised the Ipswich Essentials composed of miners, railway employees and others in reserved essential occupations. After the war, the club entered a golden era when soccer was very popular in Ipswich and matches between the four major district teams, Saint Helen's, Blackstone Rovers, Bundamba Rangers and the Dinmore Bushrats, were hotly contested. St Helen's was a very successful club and had large spectator support and a number of outstanding players. Lance Petie, Duncan McKenna and Chas Matters played for Queensland and Alan "Oscar" Pitcairn, Gordon "Bunny" Nunn, Col Kitching, Cliff Sander and Brian Vogler all played for Australia. Sander, Vogler and Kitching represented Australia in the 1956 Melbourne Olympic team, together with coach Al Warren. 1956 was a peak year for St Helen's peak when they won all major trophies offered.

In the 1960s soccer in Queensland became more professional and top players were drawn to major ethnic clubs in Brisbane. This inevitably had an effect on teams like St Helen's that lost players. Dinmore merged with Redbank and then this club merged with St Helens in 1966 to form St Helens United. In 1967 St Helens regained some team members and won the Ampol Cup.

In 1969, the local war memorial was moved to the grounds from near the Ebbw Vale railway station. This digger statue on a sandstone pedestal was made by Andrew Lang Petrie and was unveiled on Saturday 11 May 1918. It honours those from the area who served in World War I and includes the names of several soccer team members including William Jeffrey, Peter Jeffrey, H Mills and possibly LW Breslin.

Ebbw Vale became a suburb of Ipswich in 1949 and in 1971 a new certificate of title was issued to the Council of the City of Ipswich. It continued to be leased to the sports club, initially through individuals, then from 1993 to St Helen's United Soccer and Recreation Club Inc. At this time, the clubhouse was built using volunteer labour.

St Helen's merged with Coalstars Soccer Club in 1997 to form the Ipswich Knights. At the time it was agreed that the Coalstars' ground would be upgraded to QSF Premier League standards and the Ebbw Vale field used women's and junior matches. Some local families now have fourth generation members playing soccer on the field. While soccer has always been played at the ground, it has also provided a venue for cricket and for baseball, softball and touch football. Other clubs have also used the facilities. The field, being an accessible open space, has also been used for community gatherings at Christmas and on Australia Day. A community breakfast was held on the field for Anzac Day 2002.

== Description ==
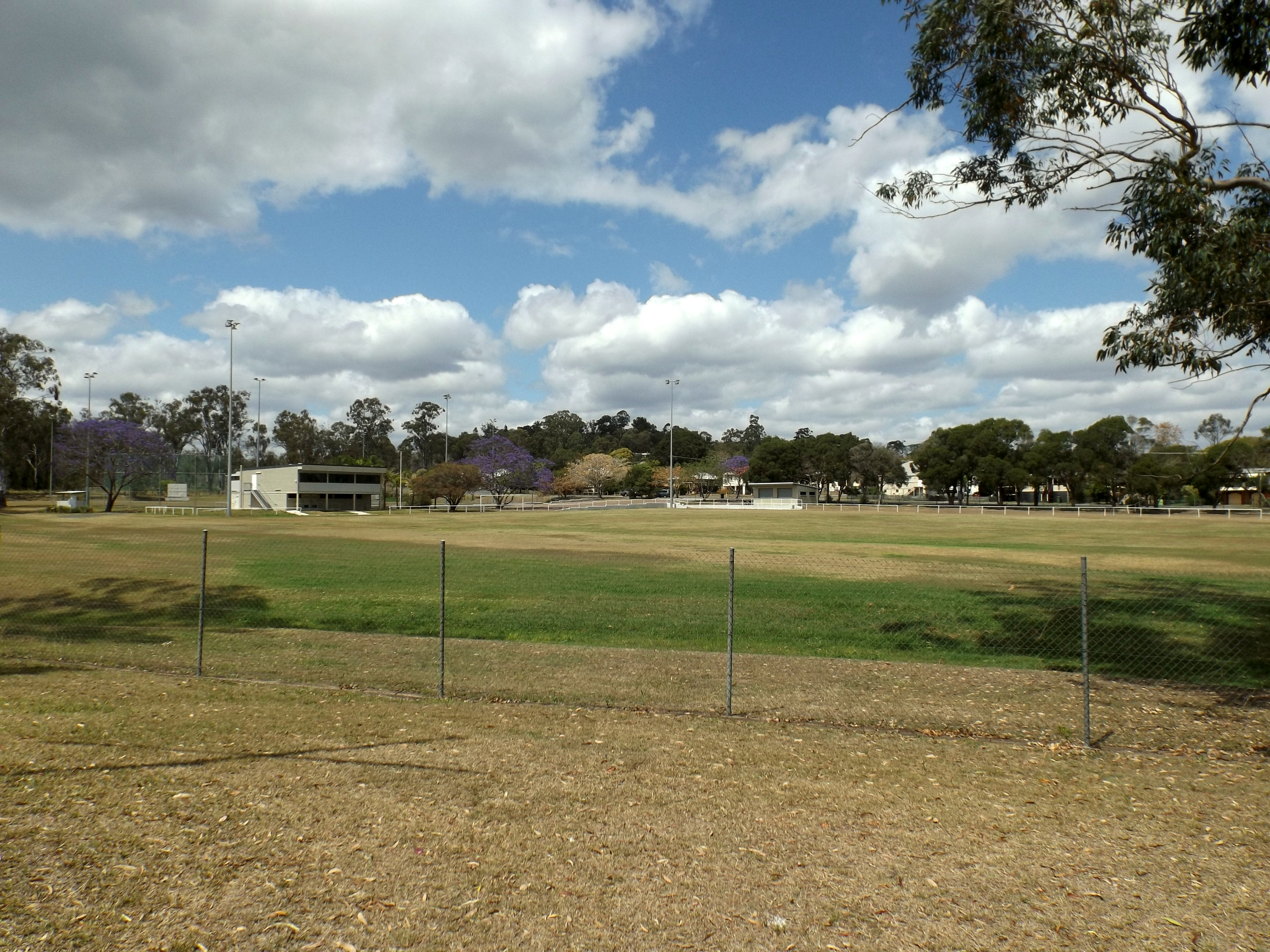
Soccer field, 2015

Ebbw Vale is a small suburb and the soccer field occupies approximately 1/7 of the populated land area.

The park contains two playing fields. The original soccer field faces Brisbane Road and the second field to the rear of the site is also used for cricket, baseball, softball and touch football as well as swap meets and other gatherings.

A car park and a two-storey brick clubhouse separate the two fields. The clubhouse has a skillion roof and large windows on the upper storey that overlook the main soccer field. There is also a bank of stands and a viewing box, a small canteen and concrete toilet block, a metal storage shed and a recreation area comprising a shelter, picnic tables and benches

The other major feature of the park is the war memorial that is situated at the corner of Brisbane Road and Jordan Street. It comprises a square granite base supporting a pedestal of white Helidon sandstone and a life-sized statue of a Digger in marching kit above crossed British and Australian flags. Pilasters of brown sandstone with Corinthian capitals separate recessed marble plaques on each face of the pedestal. These bear the names of 22 volunteers from the district.

== Heritage listing ==
Ebbw Vale Memorial Park was listed on the Queensland Heritage Register on 17 May 2004 having satisfied the following criteria.

The place is important in demonstrating the evolution or pattern of Queensland's history.

The ground at Ebbw Vale was made available as a venue for football and cricket games for employees of the Whitwood Colliery in the late 19th century. Soccer became an important sporting activity in Ipswich through the city's coal mining industry and its links with Yorkshire and Wales, where pit football teams were common. The Ebbw Vale field is connected with the development of soccer in Queensland, both as an early pit field and as the home of a successful club that produced a number of state, national and Olympic players in the mid 20th century.

The place demonstrates rare, uncommon or endangered aspects of Queensland's cultural heritage.

Ebbw Vale Memorial Park is uncommon as a 19th-century soccer ground in Queensland, which has been continuously in use for this purpose. Raymond Park (Pineapple Park) in Brisbane is slightly older, but this has not been in continuous use for soccer.

The place has a strong or special association with a particular community or cultural group for social, cultural or spiritual reasons.

Ebbw Vale Memorial Park has been traditionally maintained by community effort and local volunteers have cared for the ground and provided coaches and players, in some cases for several generations. The park has social significance as a testimony of continuous voluntary service and because it forms a recreational focus for the local community.
