= New Chum, Queensland =

New Chum Ipswich, Queensland
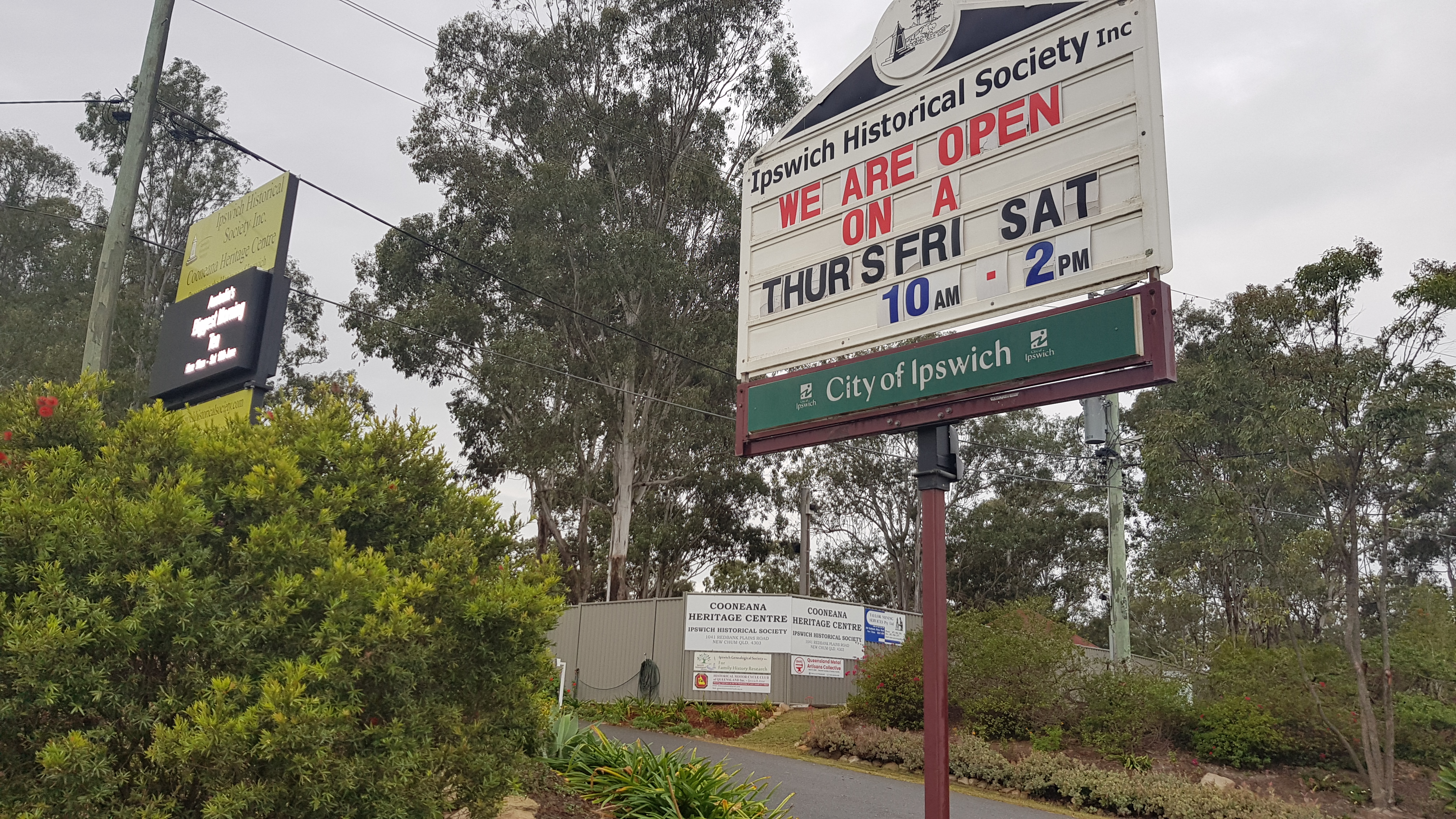
- Cooneana Heritage Centre, 2023

- Coordinates: 27.6180°S 152.8305°E
- Population: 0 (2021 census)
  - Density: 0.00/km^{2} (0.00/sq mi)
- Postcode(s): 4303
- Area: 6.0 km^{2} (2.3 sq mi)
- Time zone: AEST (UTC+10:00)
- Location: 34 km (21 mi) from Brisbane; 9 km (6 mi) from Ipswich
- LGA(s): City of Ipswich
- State electorate(s): Bundamba
- Federal division(s): Blair
Suburbs around New Chum:
Ebbw Vale	Dinmore	Riverview
Bundamba	New Chum	Collingwood Park
Blackstone	Redbank Plains	Collingwood Park

New Chum is a suburb in the City of Ipswich, Queensland, Australia. In the 2021 census, New Chum had "no people or a very low population".

== History ==
The suburb takes its name from the New Chum mine.

== Demographics ==
In the 2016 census, New Chum had "no people or a very low population".

In the 2021 census, New Chum had "no people or a very low population".

== Dinosaur fossils ==
Underground coal mines were present in the area from the late 1800s to towards the end of the twentieth century. In 1964, dinosaur footprints were discovered from the Rhondda colliery 230 metres below ground along the sandstone ceiling of the Striped Bacon coal seam. These were initially described as Eubrontes, a type of predatory dinosaur (theropod) footprint. Later, these footprints were considered as evidence for the world's largest Triassic theropod, with legs towering over 2 metres tall. A 3D evaluation of the fossil indicated the footprint length was much smaller than previously reported (34 cm rather than 46 cm long) and its shape was characteristic of the trace fossil genus (ichnogenus) Evazoum. The existing hypothesis is that Evazoum were made by prosauropods, ancestral forms of long-necked sauropod dinosaurs. The bipedal dinosaur track-maker may have resembled the dinosaur Plateosaurus, and this fossil is the only evidence of this group of dinosaurs in Australia. The next evidence for sauropodomorphs in Australia comes over 50 million years later in the Jurassic.

== Landfill ==
Cleanaway operates a landfill site in the suburb. The facility is the cause of odour complaints.
