= Dinmore railway station =

Railway station in Queensland, Australia

Dinmore
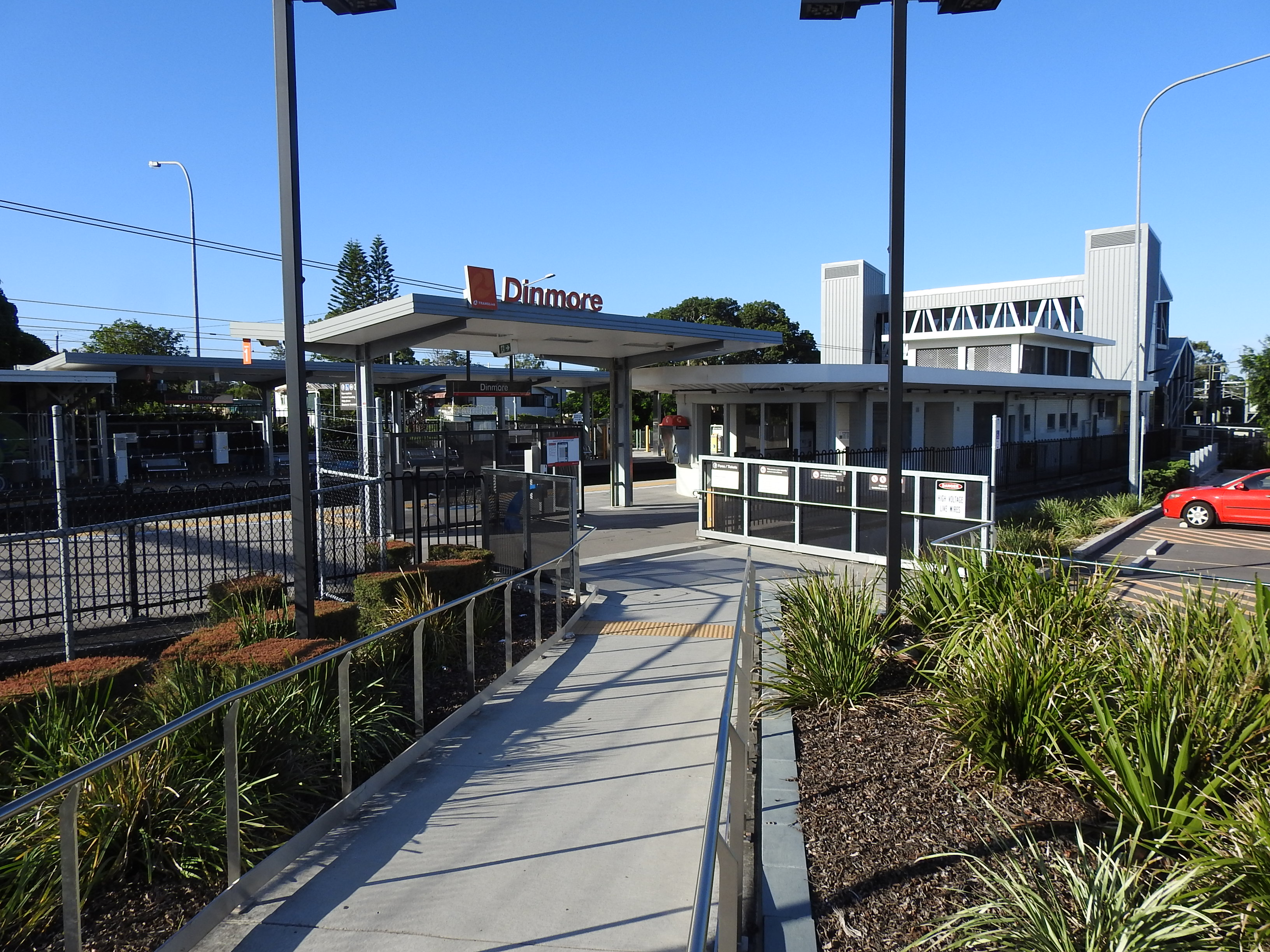
- Entrance to the station in March 2021

General information
- Location: Mason Street, Dinmore
- Coordinates: 27.5963°S 152.8336°E
- Owner: Queensland Rail
- Operator: Queensland Rail
- Line: T1 Ipswich/Rosewood
- Distance: 30.83 kilometres from Central
- Platforms: 2 side
- Tracks: 2

Construction
- Structure type: Ground
- Parking: 460 bays

Other information
- Station code: 600337 (platform 1); 600338 (platform 2)
- Fare zone: Zone 3
- Website: Queensland Rail

History
- Opened: 1884; 142 years ago
- Rebuilt: 2017; 9 years ago

Services
Preceding station	Queensland Rail	Following station
Riverview towards Caboolture via Roma Street	T1 Ipswich/Rosewood line	Ebbw Vale towards Ipswich or Rosewood
Location

Dinmore is a railway station operated by Queensland Rail on the Ipswich/Rosewood line. It opened in 1884 and serves the Ipswich suburb of Dinmore. It is a ground level station, featuring two side platforms.

== Platforms and services ==
Dinmore is served by trains operating to and from Ipswich and Rosewood. Most city-bound services run to Caboolture and Nambour, with some morning peak trains terminating at Bowen Hills. Some afternoon inbound services on weekdays run to Kippa-Ring. Dinmore is eleven minutes from Ipswich and 47 minutes on an all-stops train from Central.

Dinmore platform arrangement
Platform	Line	Destination	Notes
1	T1 Ipswich/Rosewood	Ipswich or Rosewood	
2	T1 Ipswich/Rosewood	Roma Street (to Caboolture and Nambour/Gympie North lines)	
