= Ebbw Vale railway station, Ipswich =

Railway station in Queensland, Australia

Ebbw Vale
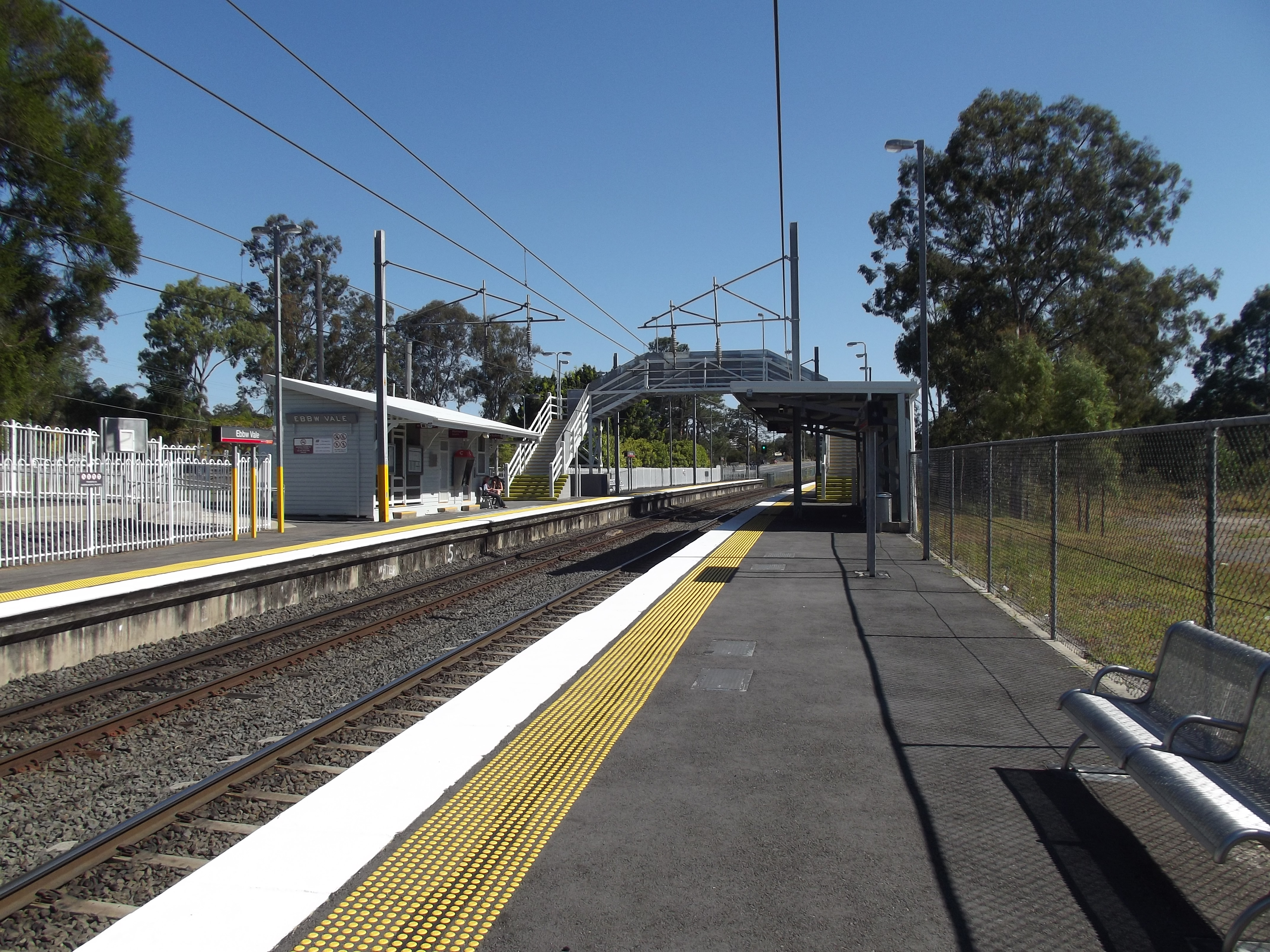
- South-west bound view from Platform 2 in September 2012

General information
- Location: Brisbane Road, Ebbw Vale
- Coordinates: 27.6034°S 152.8221°E
- Owner: Queensland Rail
- Operator: Queensland Rail
- Line: T1 Ipswich/Rosewood
- Distance: 32.23 kilometres from Central
- Platforms: 2 side
- Tracks: 2

Construction
- Structure type: Ground
- Parking: 72 bays

Other information
- Station code: 600339 (platform 1); 600340 (platform 2)
- Fare zone: Zone 3
- Website: Queensland Rail

History
- Opened: 5 October 1874; 151 years ago
- Former names: St Helens; Ebbwvale; Ebbw-vale

Services
| Preceding station | Queensland Rail | Following station |
|---|---|---|
| Dinmore towards Caboolture via Roma Street | T1 Ipswich/Rosewood line | Bundamba towards Ipswich or Rosewood |
Location

Ebbw Vale is a railway station operated by Queensland Rail on the Ipswich/Rosewood line. It opened in 1874 and serves the Ipswich suburb of Ebbw Vale. It is a ground level station, featuring two side platforms.

== History ==
It opened as St Helens, being renamed Ebbwvale in 1910. The name was hyphenated to Ebbw-vale and officially called Ebbw Vale by 1928.

== Platforms and services ==
Ebbw Vale is served by trains operating to and from Ipswich and Rosewood. Most city-bound services run to Caboolture and Nambour, with some morning peak trains terminating at Bowen Hills. Some afternoon inbound services on weekdays run to Kippa-Ring. Ebbw Vale is nine minutes from Ipswich and 49 minutes on an all-stops train from Central.

Ebbw Vale platform arrangement
| Platform | Line | Destination | Notes |
|---|---|---|---|
| 1 | T1 Ipswich/Rosewood | Ipswich or Rosewood | |
| 2 | T1 Ipswich/Rosewood | Roma Street (to Caboolture and Nambour/Gympie North lines) | |
