= Dinmore, Queensland =

Dinmore Ipswich, Queensland
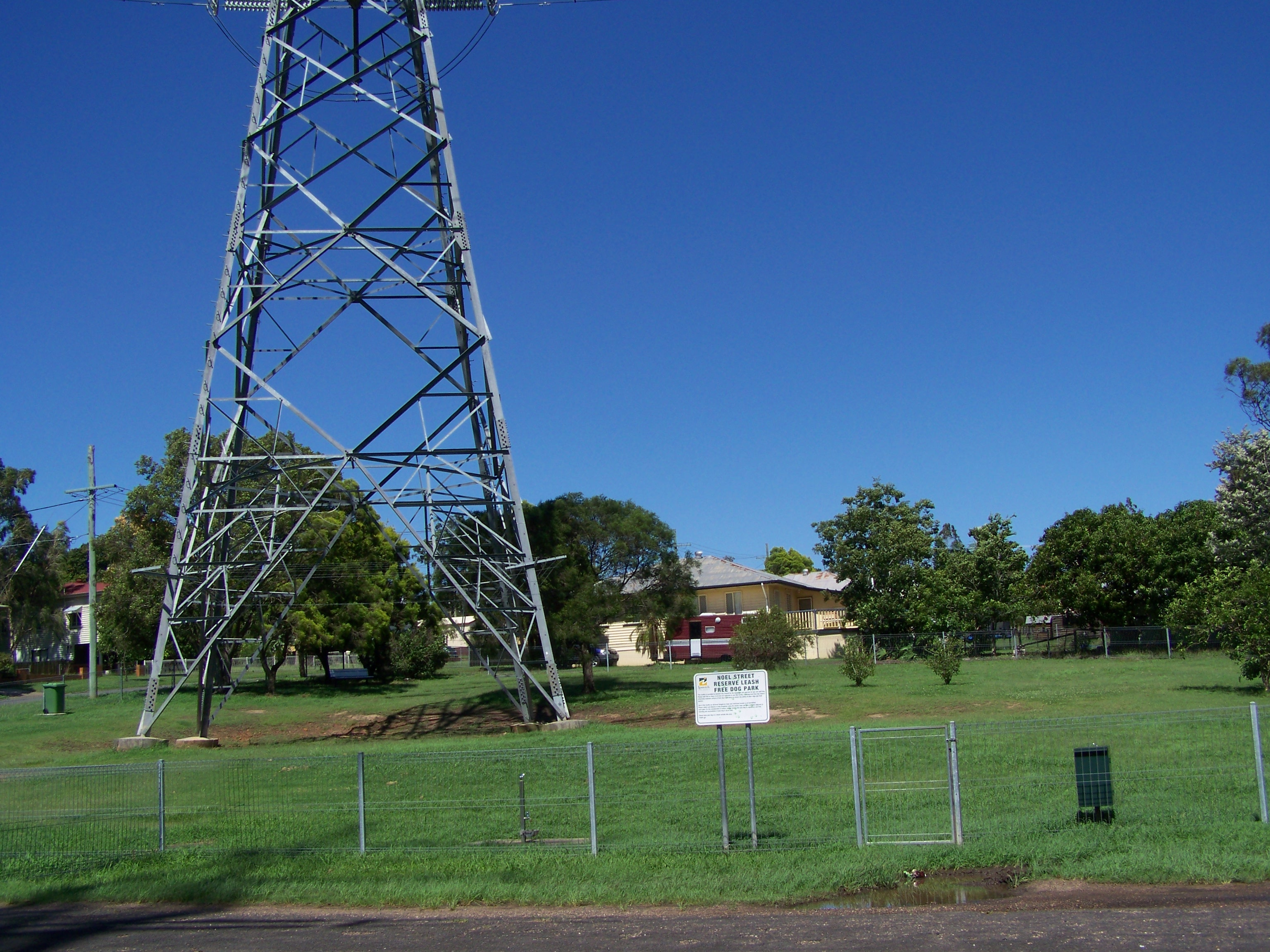
- Dog park, Dinmore, 2010

- Coordinates: 27.5966°S 152.8341°E
- Population: 1,109 (2021 census)
  - Density: 1,010/km^{2} (2,610/sq mi)
- Postcode(s): 4303
- Area: 1.1 km^{2} (0.4 sq mi)
- Time zone: AEST (UTC+10:00)
- Location: 8.1 km (5 mi) ENE of Ipswich CBD; 33.0 km (21 mi) SW of Brisbane CBD
- LGA(s): City of Ipswich
- State electorate(s): Bundamba
- Federal division(s): Blair
Suburbs around Dinmore:
Bundamba	Moggill	Riverview
Ebbw Vale	Dinmore	Collingwood Park
Blackstone	New Chum	Redbank Plains

Dinmore is a suburb of Ipswich in the City of Ipswich, Queensland, Australia. In the 2021 census, Dinmore had a population of 1,109 people.

== Geography ==
Dinmore is situated in the crossroads area of, and is basically bordered by, the Ipswich Motorway, the Cunningham Highway, and the Warrego Highway. Brisbane Road, the main street leading to the nearby historical centre of Ipswich, runs through the middle of Dinmore. Many of the locals call Dinmore, "The Gateway to the City," because it is at the entranceway to Ipswich, as well as being the entrance to Brisbane, from the West. Brisbane Road, in Dinmore, has a few shops and restaurants, with main shopping areas in nearby Booval and Redbank. Dinmore is only minutes from the city, but still has the feel of a rural suburb, with parks and green spaces throughout.

River Road (Queensland) runs from the Warrego Highway in Riverview to the Cunningham Highway in Dinmore.

== History ==
The origin of the suburb name is from a village called Hope under Dinmore in Herefordshire, England.

The Dinmore Pottery was opened in the 1880s, close to the original Dinmore settlement, almost by chance, rather than by specific forward planning. The original plan had been to establish a new mine shaft on the site, however the clay found there was of such a high quality that the establishment of a pottery and brickworks was thought to be a more viable proposition. Bricks were to be the main product produced until the turn of the century when the owners, Gilson and Rumble began making pottery and related items, as well as continuing with the production of bricks.

On 16 April 1887 auctioneer R.J. Cottell offered 140 suburban blocks in the Dinmore Township Estate. The estate was split by the Ipswich railway line into two sections. The section to the north of the railway line was bounded by the railway line to the south, Earl Street to the west, the Warrego Highway to the north and the River Road to the east. The section to the south of the railway line is bounded by the railway line to the north, River Road to the east, Brisbane Road to the south (to its intersection with Robert Street). The Dinmore railway station was to the immediate east of the estate.

In 1888, a Baptist Church opened in Dinmore.

Dinmore State School opened on 19 January 1891. It was on the south-west corner of River Road and Claydon Street (27.5937°S 152.8320°E). It closed on 31 December 2009. The school's website was archived.

In October 1901, a Methodist church was being erected at a cost of £200. It opened on Saturday 9 November 1901.

On Saturday 20 February 1915, a stump-capping ceremony was held for a new Anglican church in Dinmore. St Matthew's Anglican Church was dedicated circa 1915. It closed circa 1989. It was later occupied by the Second Samoan Congregational Church congregation, but is now in private ownership It is still extant at 8 New Chum Road (27.5987°S 152.8319°E).

== Demographics ==
In the 2006 census, Dinmore had a population of 897 people.

In the 2011 census, Dinmore had a population of 907 people.

In the 2016 census, Dinmore had a population of 875 people.

In the 2021 census, Dinmore had a population of 1,109 people.

== Amenities ==
Dinmore Murri Baptist Church is at 38 Brisbane Road (27.5980°S 152.8311°E).

== Transport ==
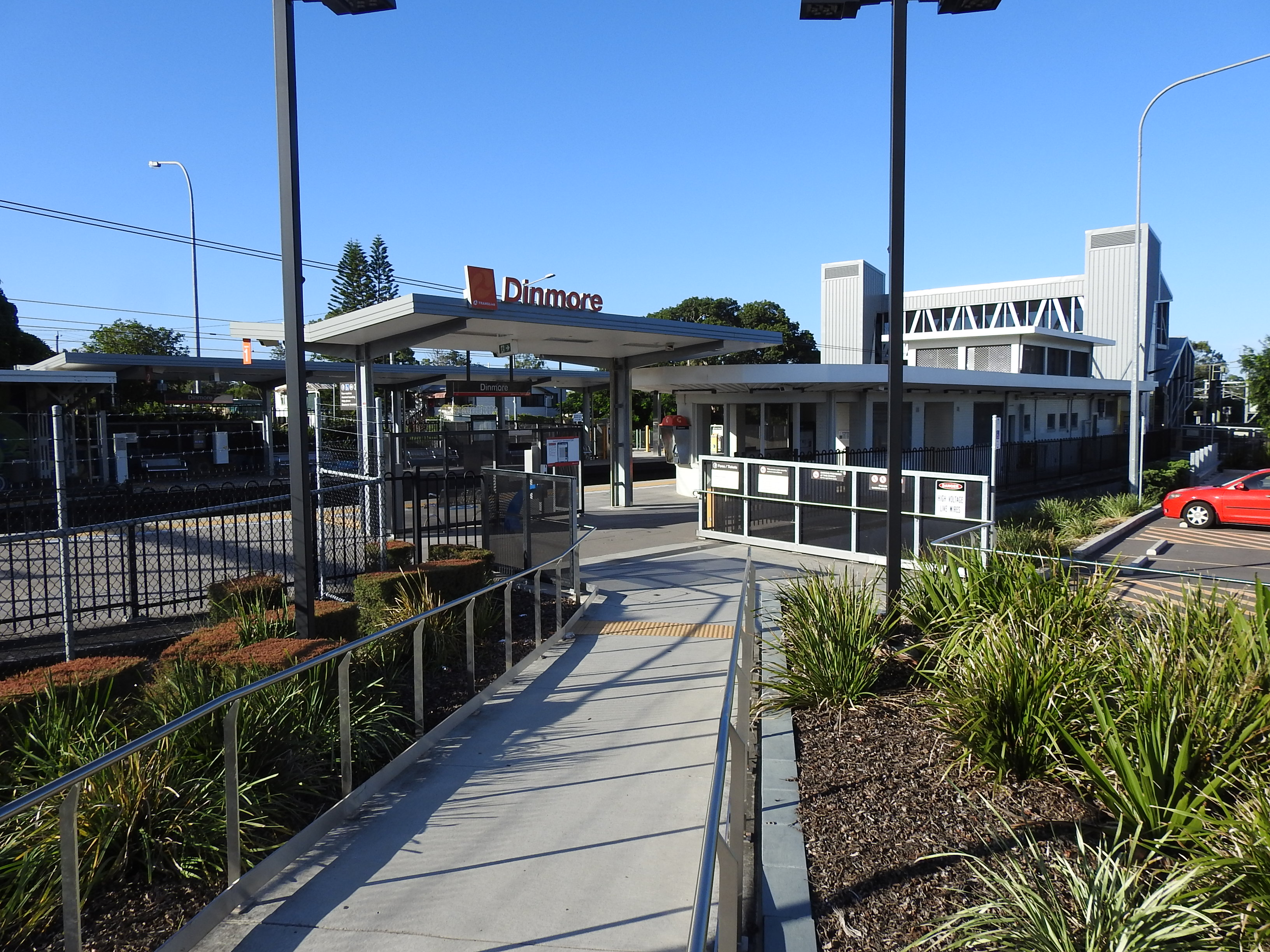
Rail station platform entrance

Dinmore railway station (27.5962°S 152.8335°E) provides access to regular Queensland Rail City network services to Brisbane, Ipswich and Rosewood via Ipswich. As well, regular bus services are available throughout. Dinmore Train station provides a hub for commuters coming from the Warrego Highway. A new car park was built at the station to allow for a substantial access point for driving commuters.

== Dinosaurs ==
Dinosaur tracks originating from the Upper Triassic (Norian) Blackstone Formation have been reported from Dinmore: 1) Rylance No. 5 Opencut colliery, Dinmore (Ipswich) from the Upper Triassic (Norian) Blackstone Formation (Thulborn 1998); 2) Rhondda colliery. These however originate from Ebbw Vale and New Chum, respectively.
