= Mount Walker, Queensland =

Mount Walker
- Suburb
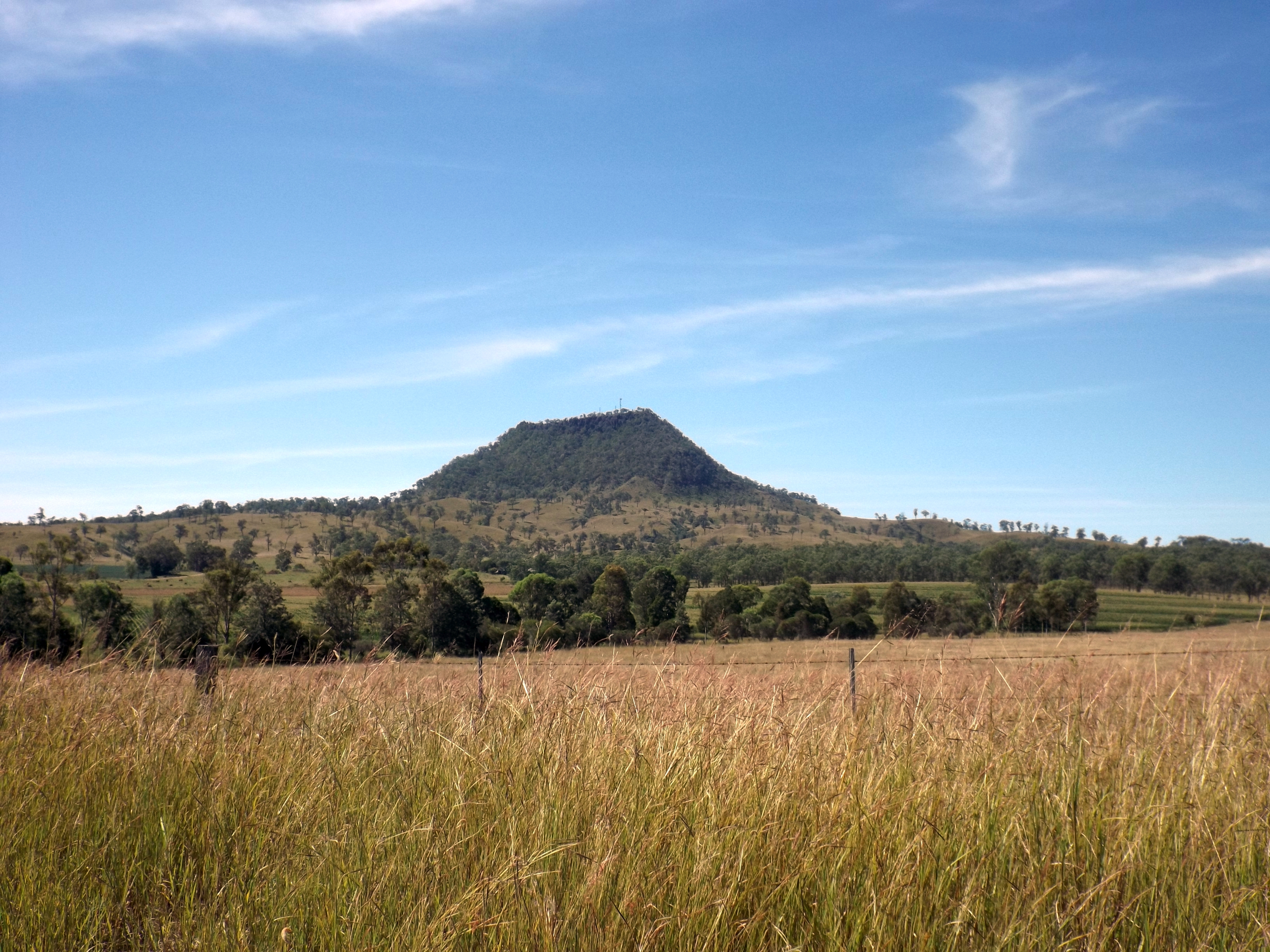
- Mount Walker viewed from Rosewood Warrill View Road, 2015

- Interactive map of Mount Walker
- Coordinates: 27.7772°S 152.5502°E
- Country: Australia
- State: Queensland
- LGA: Scenic Rim Region
- Location: 37.0 km (23.0 mi) SW of Ipswich CBD; 42.9 km (26.7 mi) NNW of Boonah; 73.3 km (45.5 mi) NW of Beaudesert; 76.1 km (47.3 mi) SW of Brisbane CBD

Government
  - State electorate: Scenic Rim
  - Federal division: Wright

Area
  - Total: 33.4 km^{2} (12.9 sq mi)

Population
  - Total: 129 (2021 census)
  - Density: 3.862/km^{2} (10.00/sq mi)
- Time zone: UTC+10:00 (AEST)
- Postcode: 4340
Suburbs around Mount Walker
Lower Mount Walker	Lower Mount Walker	Mount Forbes
Mount Walker West	Mount Walker	Coleyville
Rosevale	Rosevale	Coleyville

Mount Walker is a rural locality in the Scenic Rim Region, Queensland, Australia. In the 2021 census, Mount Walker had a population of 129 people.

== Geography ==
The locality is bounded to the west by the Bremer River.

Mount Walker is in the east of the locality (27.7881°S 152.5575°E), rising to 471 metres (1,545 ft) above sea level.

The land on the upper slopes of Mount Walker is undeveloped. Part of from that, the predominant land use is grazing on native vegetation with other areas of irrigated crop growing.

== History ==
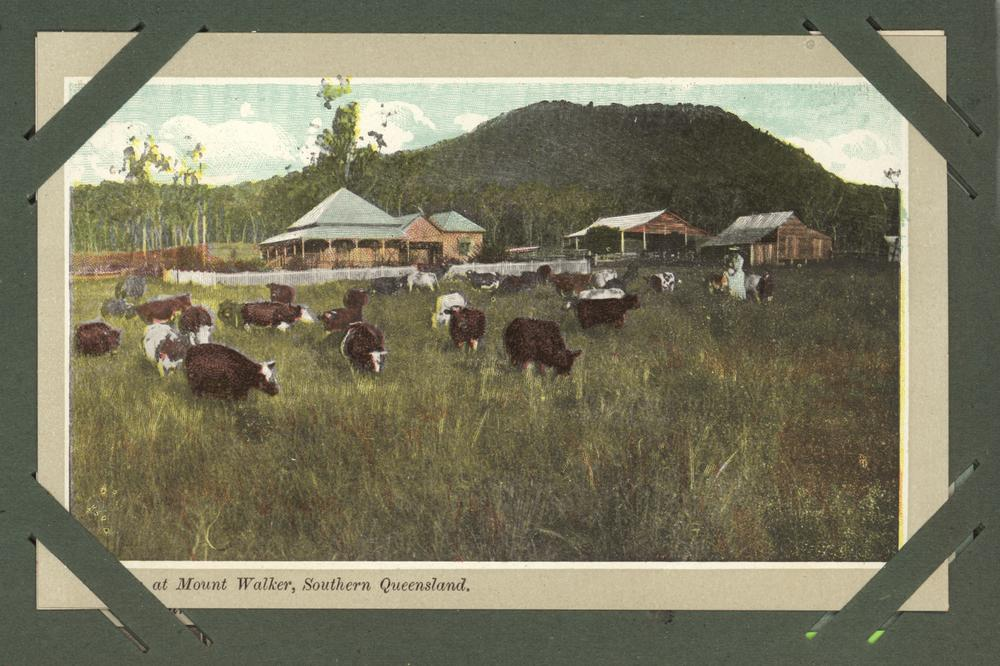
Farm at Mount Walker, circa 1907

The mountain was originally called Mount Forbes by John Oxley in honour of Sir Francis Forbes, the Chief Justice of New South Wales. However, it was later acquired the name Mount Walker. The origins of the name Walker are believed to be a shepherd of that name from the Franklyn Vale pastoral station. The locality takes its name from the mountain.

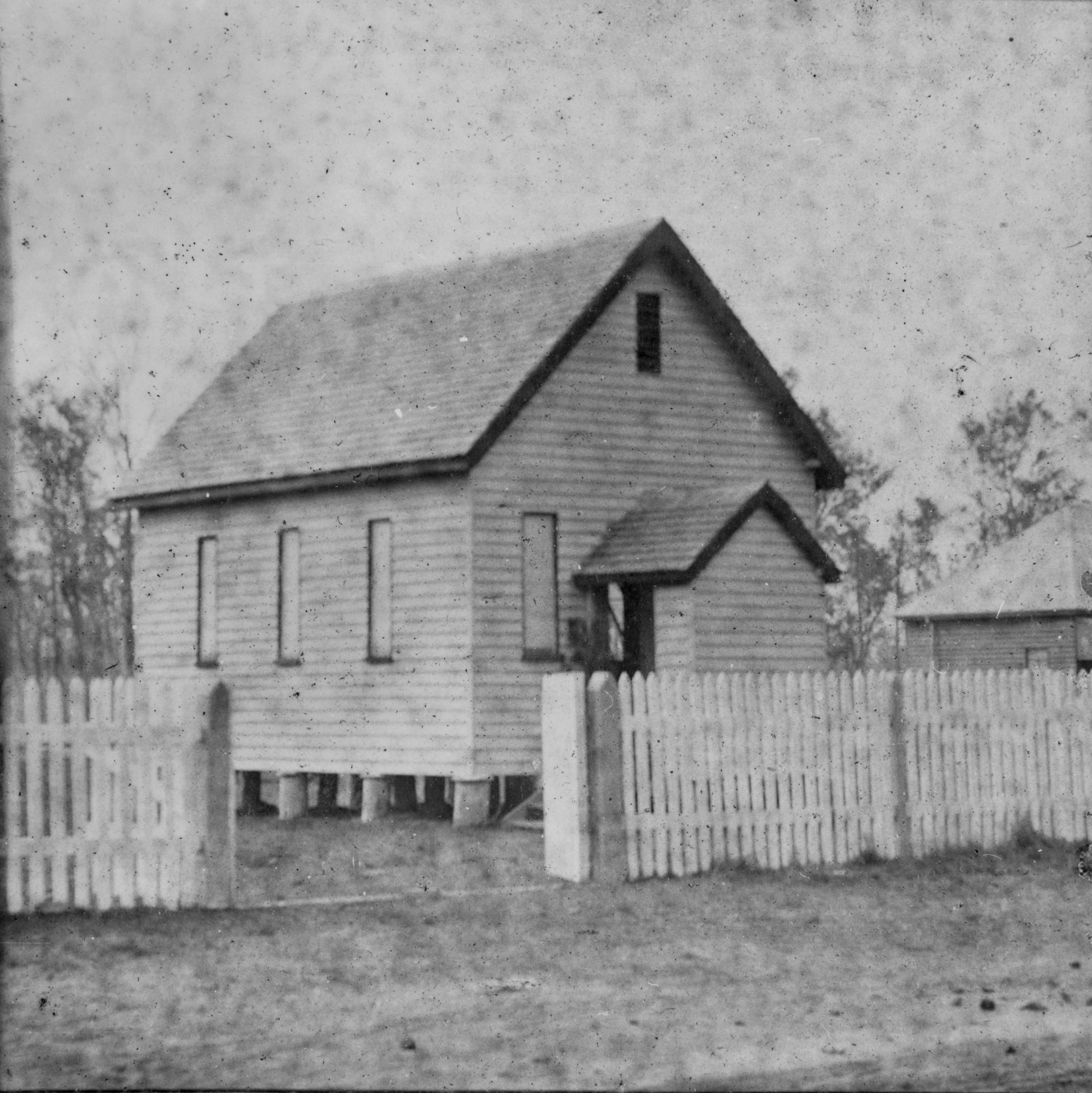
Mount Walker Congregational Church, circa 1896

Mount Walker German Baptist Church opened in 1872. For a time it was the headquarters for the German Baptist churches, until circa 1879 when that responsibility shifted to Engelsburg (now Kalbar) Baptist Church.

Mount Walker State School opened on 15 April 1878. It closed in December 1967. It was at 1775 Rosewood Warrill View Road (27.7805°S 152.5355°E) on a 25-acre (10 ha) site.

Mount Walker Church of Christ opened in 1884 and celebrated its 125th anniversary in 2009.

Mount Walker Congregational Church opened in 1896. It had closed by 1940.

Mount Walker Post Office opened on 1 October 1916 (a receiving office had been open from 1874) and closed in 1957.

== Demographics ==
In the 2016 census, Mount Walker had a population of 134 people. The locality contained 50 households, in which 51.9% of the population were males and 48.1% of the population were females with a median age of 42, 4 years above the national average. The average weekly household income was $1,208, $230 below the national average. 5.3% of Mount Walker's population was either of Aboriginal or Torres Strait Islander descent. 76.3% of the population aged 15 or over was either registered or de facto married, while 23.7% of the population was not married. 34.6% of the population attended some form of a compulsory education. The most common nominated ancestries were Australian (40.1%), English (19.8%) and German (9.3%), while the most common country of birth was Australia (79.4%), and the most commonly spoken language at home was English (86.7%). The most common nominated religions were Catholic (19.4%), Not stated (18.0%) and No religion (15.1%). The most common occupation was a technician/trades worker (26.2%) and the majority/plurality of residents worked 40 or more hours per week (49.2%).

In the 2021 census, Mount Walker had a population of 129 people.

== Education ==
There are no school in Mount Walker. The nearest government primary schools are Mutdapilly State School in Mutdapilly to the east and Warrill View State School in Warrill View to the south-east. The nearest government secondary school is Rosewood State High School in Rosewood to the north.

== Amenities ==
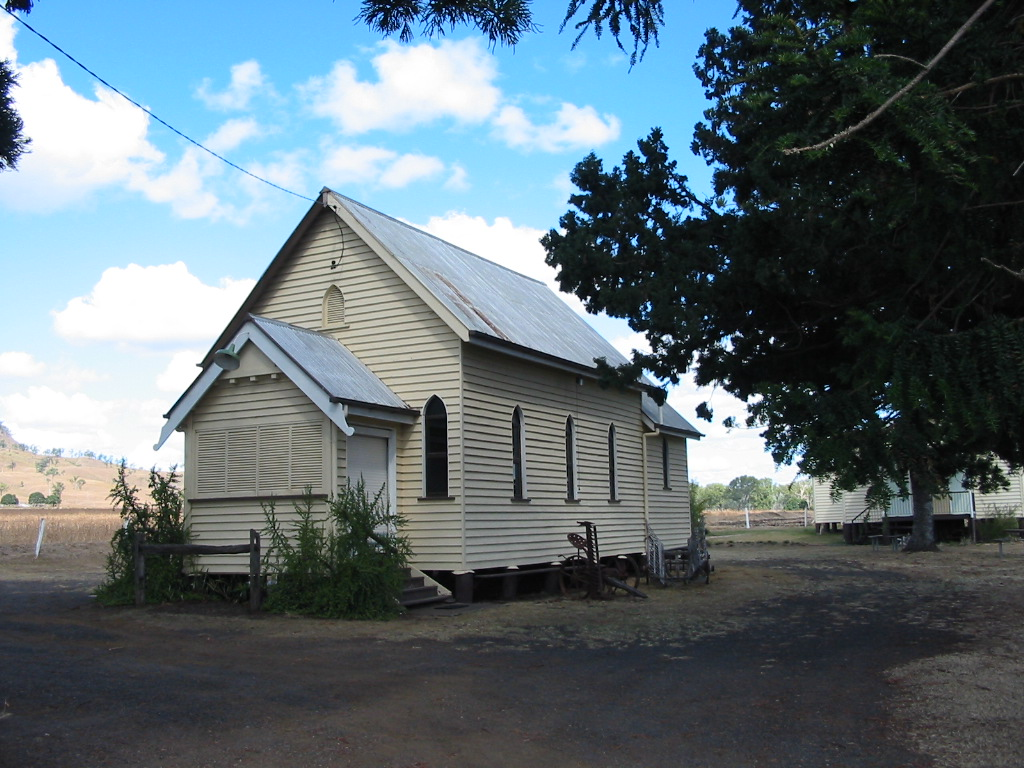
Church of Christ, Mount Walker, 2005

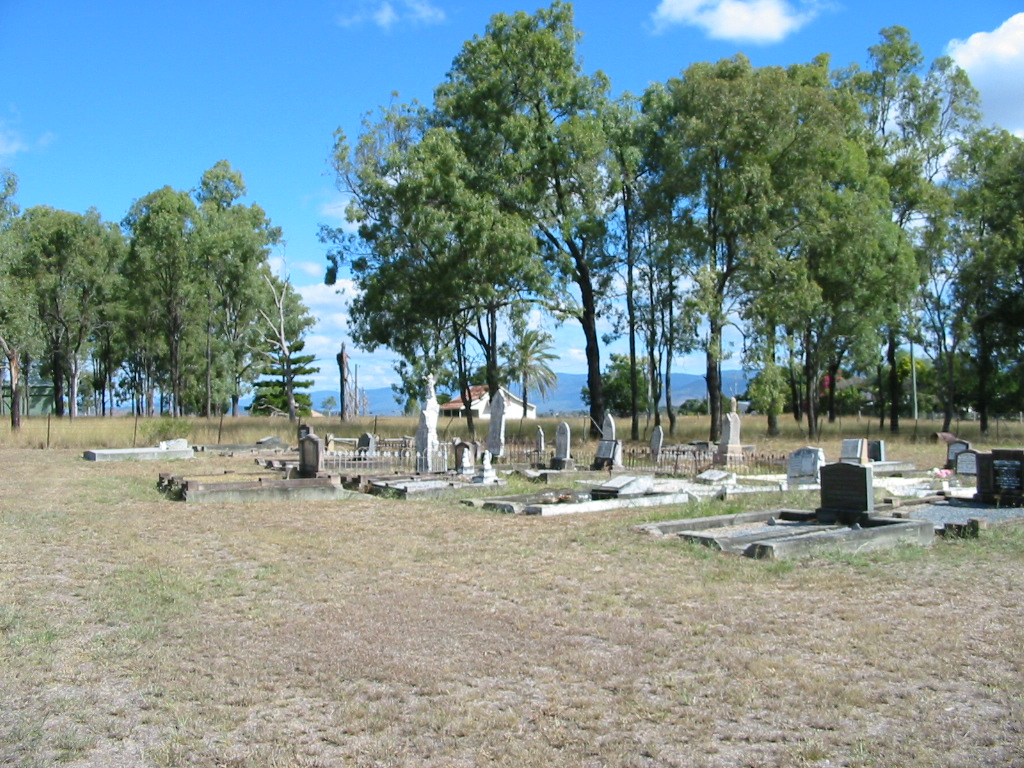
Mount Walker Public Cemetery, 2005

Mount Walker Church of Christ is located at 10 Hinrichsen Road, just off the Rosewood-Warrill View Road (27.7729°S 152.5374°E); weekly Sunday services are held at the church.

Mount Walker General Cemetery is located at 1744–1752 Rosewood-Warrill View Road (27.7788°S 152.5356°E).
