= Mount Walker West, Queensland =

Mount Walker West
- Suburb
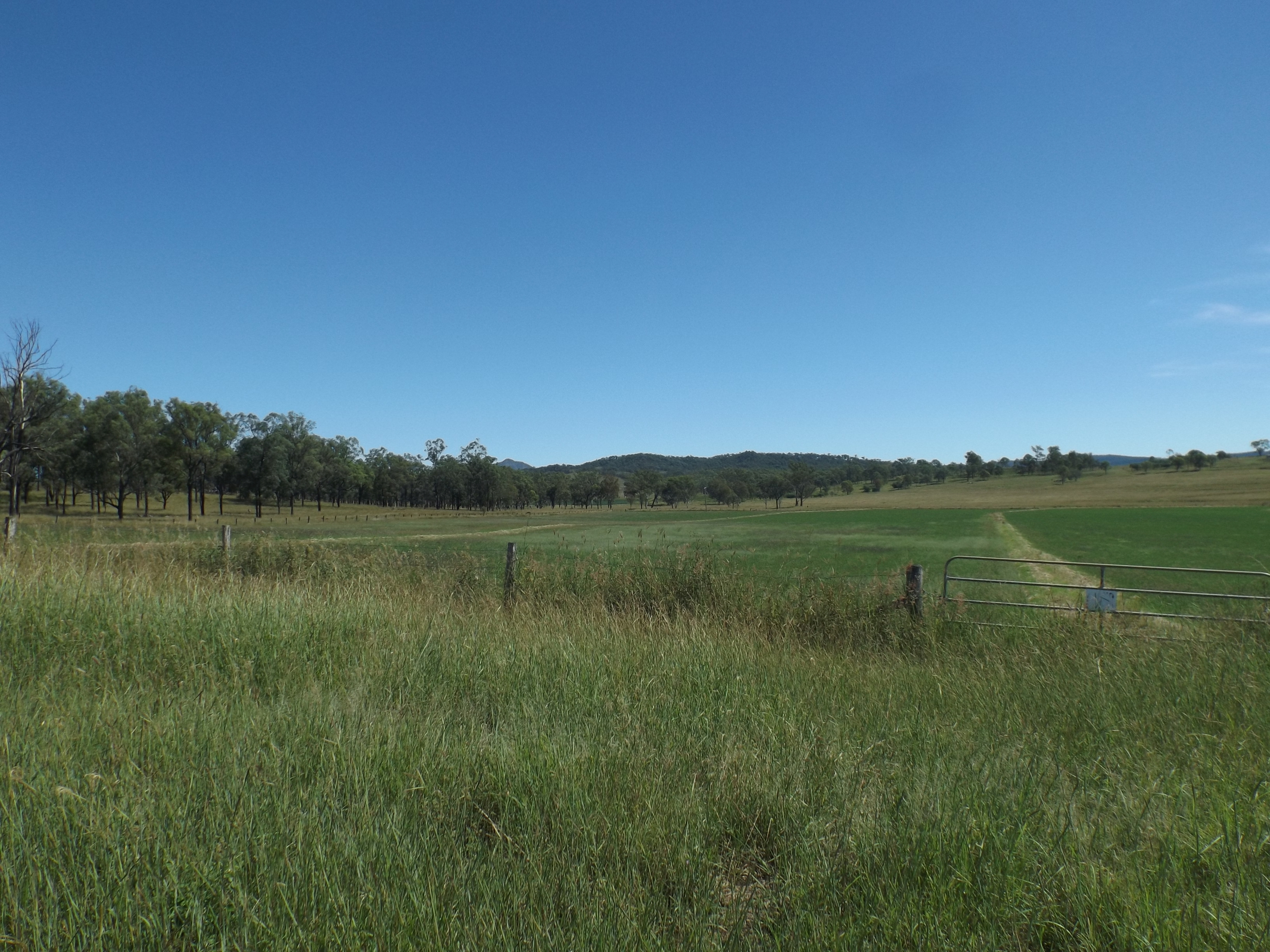
- Fields along Mount Walker West Road, 2015

- Interactive map of Mount Walker West
- Coordinates: 27.7819°S 152.5130°E
- Country: Australia
- State: Queensland
- LGAs: Scenic Rim Region; City of Ipswich
- Location: 40.1 km (24.9 mi) SW of Ipswich; 47.4 km (29.5 mi) NE of Boonah; 79.2 km (49.2 mi) SW of Brisbane; 101 km (63 mi) NW of Beaudesert

Government
  - State electorate: Scenic Rim
  - Federal divisions: Wright; Blair

Area
  - Total: 18.5 km^{2} (7.1 sq mi)

Population
  - Total: 31 (2021 census)
  - Density: 1.676/km^{2} (4.34/sq mi)
- Time zone: UTC+10:00 (AEST)
- Postcode: 4340
Suburbs around Mount Walker West
Mount Mort	Lower Mount Walker	Lower Mount Walker
Mount Mort	Mount Walker West	Mount Walker
Mount Mort	Merryvale	Rosevale

Mount Walker West is a rural locality split between the Scenic Rim Region and City of Ipswich local government areas of Queensland, Australia. In the 2021 census, Mount Walker West had a population of 31 people.

== Geography ==
Mount Walker West is in South East Queensland.

The locality is bounded to the east by the Bremer River. The elevation rises from 60 metres (200 ft) above sea level near the river in the east to 260 metres (850 ft) in the west of the locality.

The land use is a mixture of grazing on native vegetation, growing crops, and plantation forestry.

== History ==
The locality takes its name from the mountain Mount Walker, which was originally named Mount Forbes by John Oxley on 22 September 1824 after Sir Francis Forbes, the Chief Justice of New South Wales. The name was subsequently altered to Mount Walker, a shepherd called Walker on the Franklyn Vale pastoral run.

== Demographics ==
In the 2016 census, Mount Walker West had a population of 19 people.

In the 2021 census, Mount Walker West had a population of 31 people.

== Education ==
There are no schools in Mount Walker West. The nearest government primary schools are Warrill View State School in Warrill View to the south-east and Mutdapilly State School in Mutdapilly to the east. The nearest government secondary school is Rosewood State High School in Rosewood to the north-east.
