= Lower Mount Walker, Queensland =

Lower Mount Walker
- Suburb
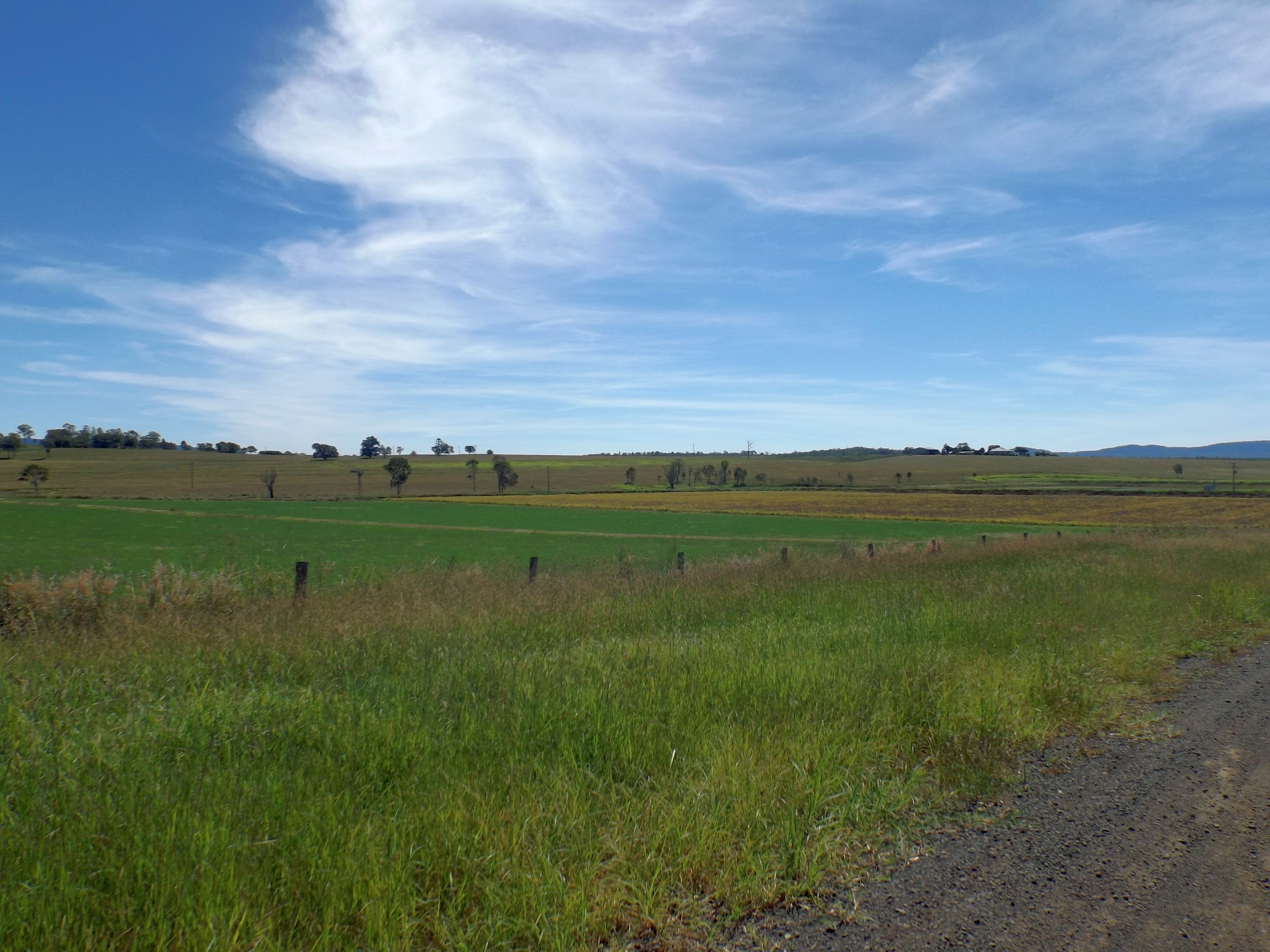
- Fields along Stokes Crossing Road, 2015

- Interactive map of Lower Mount Walker
- Coordinates: 27.7180°S 152.5252°E
- Country: Australia
- State: Queensland
- LGAs: City of Ipswich; Scenic Rim Region
- Location: 11.4 km (7.1 mi) SW of Rosewood; 30.6 km (19.0 mi) WSW of Ipswich; 52.7 km (32.7 mi) N of Boonah; 68.6 km (42.6 mi) WSW of Brisbane; 77.9 km (48.4 mi) NW of Beaudesert

Government
  - State electorate: Scenic Rim
  - Federal divisions: Blair; Wright

Area
  - Total: 58.6 km^{2} (22.6 sq mi)

Population
  - Total: 192 (2021 census)
  - Density: 3.276/km^{2} (8.486/sq mi)
- Time zone: UTC+10:00 (AEST)
- Postcode: 4340
Suburbs around Lower Mount Walker
Calvert	Lanefield; Rosewood	Ebenezer
Grandchester	Lower Mount Walker	Mount Forbes
Mount Mort	Mount Walker West	Mount Walker

Lower Mount Walker is a locality split between the Scenic Rim Region and City of Ipswich local government areas of South East Queensland, Australia. In the 2021 census, Lower Mount Walker had a population of 192 people.

== Geography ==
The Bremer River enters the locality from the south (Mount Walker West / Mount Walker) and exits to the north-east (Rosewood).

Rosewood-Warrill View Road enters the locality from the north-east (Rosewood) and exits to the south-east (Mount Walker).

Lower Mount Walker is home to a remnant swamp tea-tree forest which is considered critically endangered.

The land use is predominantly grazing on native vegetation with some crop growing, mostly near the Bremer River.

== History ==
Mount Walker Lower Provisional School opened on 12 November 1923. In 1927, the school building was relocated from Mount French to Lower Mount Walker. Mount Walker Lower State School was proclaimed on 19 March 1928. The school closed circa 1945. It was at 286-294 Mount Walker West Road (27.7051°S 152.5372°E).

== Demographics ==
In the 2016 census, Lower Mount Walker has a population of 185. The locality contained 70 households, in which 51.4% of the population were males and 48.6% of the population were females with a median age of 44, 6 years above the national average. The average weekly household income was $1,437, $1 below the national average. None of Lower Mount Walker's population was either of Aborigional or Torres Strait Islander descent. 65.2% of the population aged 15 or over were either registered or de facto married, while 34.8% of the population was not married. 31.5% of the population was currently attending some form of a compulsory education. The most common nominated ancestries were Australian (39.1%), English (21.0%) and Scottish (8.2%), while the most common country of birth was Australia (71.8%), and the most commonly spoken language at home was English (85.0%). The most common nominated religions were Catholic (26.7%), Anglican (20.6%) and Not stated (20.0%). The most common occupation was a cleric/administration worker (22.3%) and the majority/plurality of residents worked 40 or more hours per week (60.2%).

In the 2021 census, Lower Mount Walker had a population of 192 people.

== Education ==
There are no schools in Lower Mount Walker. The nearest government primary schools are:

- Ashwell State School in Ashwell to the north-west
- Rosewood State School in neighbouring Rosewood to the north
- Mutdapilly State School in Mutdapilly to the east
- Warrill View State School in Warill View to the south-east
- Grandchester State School in neighbouring Grandchester to the west

The nearest government secondary schools are Rosewood State High School in Rosewood to the north and Laidley State High School in Laidley to the north-west.
