= St Patrick's Church, Rosevale =

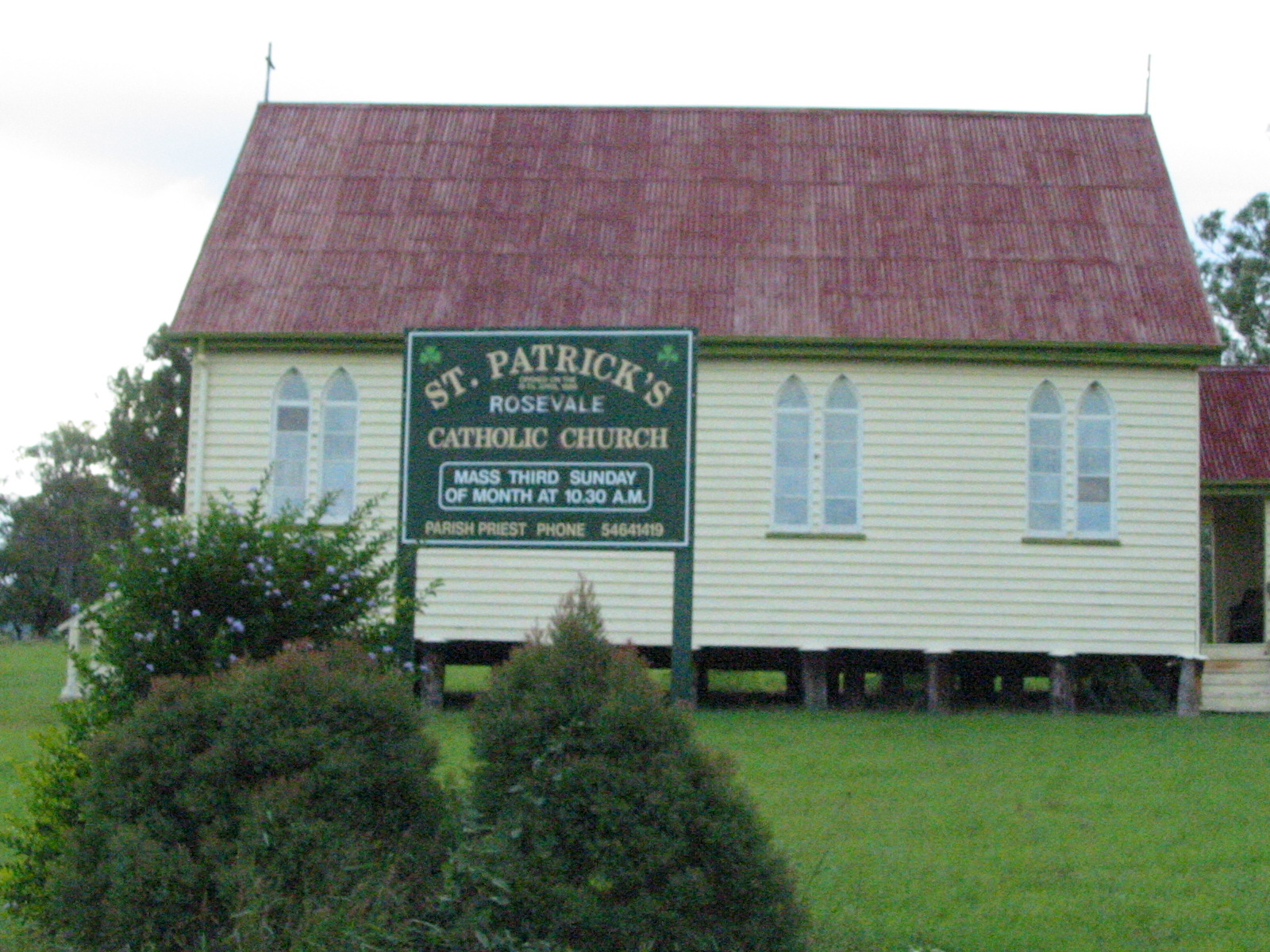
- St Patricks Catholic Church, Rosevale, 2006
- St Patrick's Church, Rosevale
- 27°51′01″S 152°28′43″E
- Address: Rosewood–Aratula Road, Rosevale, Scenic Rim Region, Queensland
- Country: Australia
- Denomination: Roman Catholic

History
- Status: Church
- Dedication: Saint Patrick
- Dedicated: 3 November 1889 by Archbishop Robert Dunne

Architecture
- Architect: Father Andrew Horan
- Architectural type: Church
- Years built: 1888 – 1889

Specifications
- Materials: Timber; corrugated iron; weatherboard

Administration
- Archdiocese: Brisbane

Queensland Heritage Register
- Official name: St Patrick's Church and Graveyard
- Type: State heritage (archaeological, built, landscape)
- Designated: 11 December 2009
- Reference no.: 602735
- Significant period: 1888–1889 (fabric); 1880s–ongoing (historical use)

St Patrick's Church is a heritage-listed Roman Catholic church at Rosewood–Aratula Road, Rosevale, Scenic Rim Region, Queensland, Australia. It was designed by Father Andrew Horan and built from 1888 to 1889. It was added to the Queensland Heritage Register on 11 December 2009.

== History ==
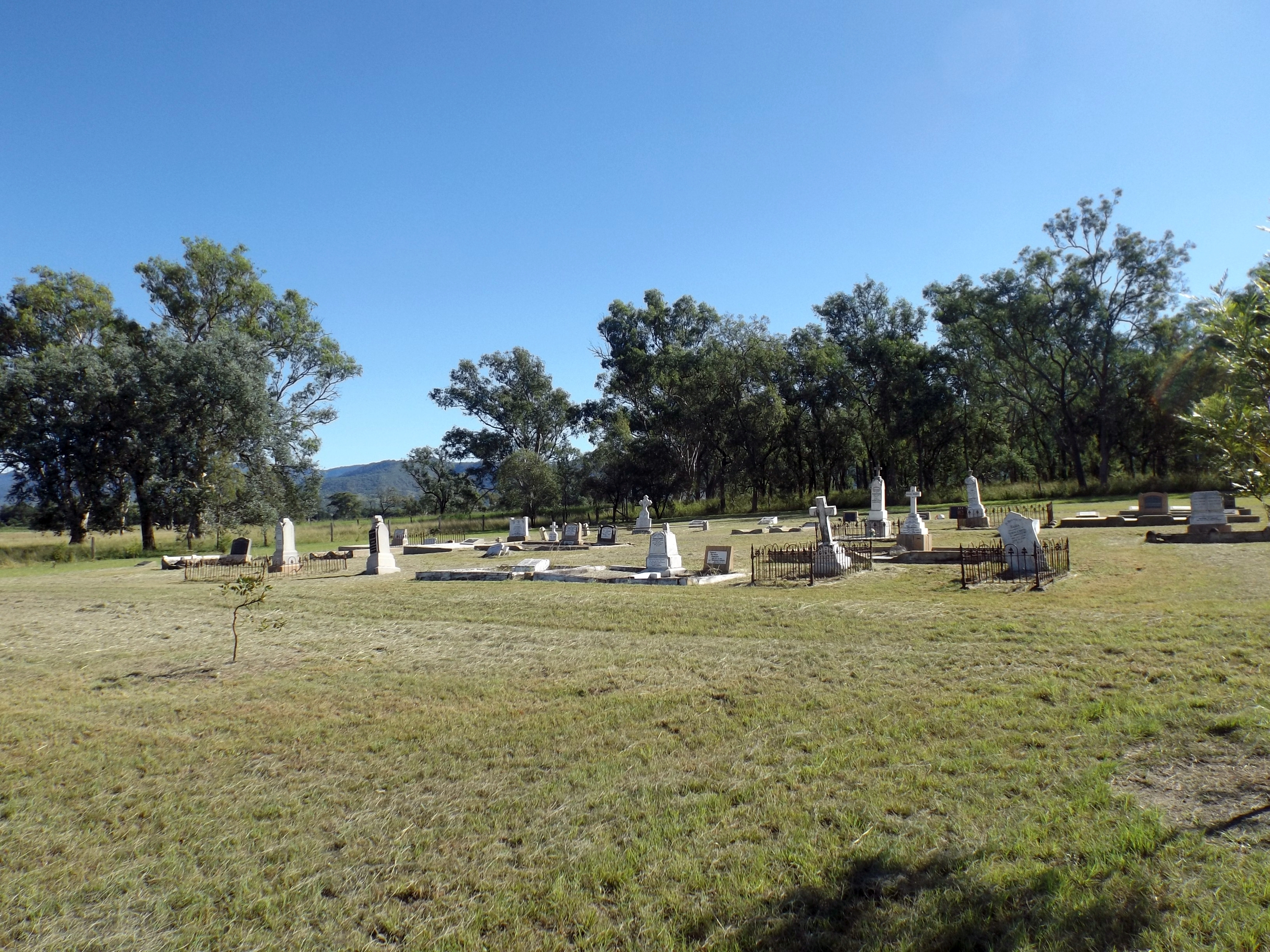
Graveyard, 2015

St Patrick's Church, a modest timber building in a picturesque rural setting, was opened in November 1889 to serve the small farming community of Rosevale, south of Ipswich in south-east Queensland. The adjacent graveyard was blessed at the same time as the church. Both remain in use, although church services are now restricted to an annual mass.

The Rosevale district was taken up c. 1846 as part of John Ross's sheep run (known variously as Rosa Ville, Rosa Vista, Rose Valley, Rose Vale, or Rosevale) during the earliest phase of free settlement and pastoral occupation in Queensland. The run extended over the lightly timbered plains of the Bremer River, with the head station situated near the present township of Rosevale. By 1848, when the lease was taken up by G John Brewster, Rosevale (Rosa Vista) comprised an estimated area of 25,600 acres with a grazing capability of 3,700 sheep. Franklin Valley (later Franklyn Vale) and Laidley runs to the north and north-west of Rosevale were owned by Joseph Robinson and together covered an area of 150,000 acres. In 1849, the Laidley and Franklyn Vale runs were acquired by partners Henry Mort and James Laidley.

Between 1848 and 1865, Rosevale was leased by a variety of early figures in Queensland history (including Charles Rolleston and Patrick Leslie in 1856, Charles Macarthur King in 1858 and Patrick Mayne in 1862) until acquired by Henry Mort in the mid-1860s to counter impending resumptions on his Laidley and Franklyn Vale properties.

The first farm blocks resumed from the Rosevale run were offered for sale in 1868, but were cancelled and re-offered in 1876. Most of these blocks were situated between the Bremer River and the road from Grandchester to Rosevale Station. In 1882, Henry Mort and partner surrendered the remainder of their Rosevale property in exchange for freehold land at Mount Mort, and this land also was subdivided into farms.

Selections on the resumed Rosevale land were taken up rapidly during the second half of the 1870s and first half of the 1880s, selectors being attracted by the rich alluvial farmland and promise of a future railway line from Rosewood through the Bremer River Valley to Rosevale and on to Warwick. The first wave of selectors comprised mainly Irish immigrants, followed within a few years by German settlers.

In the 1880s development of Rosevale as a community gathered momentum. A school was erected on a central site (approximately 500 metres (1,600 ft) north-east of the later site of St Patrick's Church) and opened in late November 1884 with 42 students. In July 1885, portions 83 to 86, Rosevale old head station, were reserved for township purposes. Although a town survey was never made, some businesses were attracted to the district, including a general store, butcher, baker, blacksmith, and in the 1890s a cheese factory and the Rosevale Co-operative Dairy Company.

As settlement in the Rosevale district expanded, the community's spiritual needs were met with the construction of a number of denominational buildings, including a Catholic church, Anglican church and Lutheran church.

In the 1870s, Irish Catholic families were among the first to take up agricultural land in the Rosevale district. Here they created a "little Ireland" centred on St Patrick's Church and the Catholic faith, which was sustained well into the 1930s.

Initially the Rosevale district was part of the Catholic parish of Ipswich established on 1 January 1849 within the Diocese of Sydney. This was a vast parish extending from Brisbane west to Warwick, south to Tenterfield and the Clarence and Richmond rivers districts, north to Maryborough, and north-west to Gayndah. In August 1852 the first parish priest, Father William McGinty, arrived and was stationed at Ipswich. In the 1850s and early 1860s he held masses in the Rosevale area in private homes. In December 1859 the colony of Queensland separated from New South Wales and the Roman Catholic Diocese of Brisbane, covering the whole of Queensland, was established. The parish of Ipswich was reduced at this time but was still a vast area extending from near Brisbane to the foot of the Great Dividing Range in the west and north to Nanango. Later, many smaller parishes were excised from the parent Ipswich parish.

The expansion of facilities in the Ipswich parish in the last quarter of the nineteenth century is closely associated with the 44 years of service by Father Andrew Horan as parish priest (1873–1917). Andrew Horan and his brothers Matthew and James – respectively parish priests of Gympie (1868–1923) and Warwick (1876–1905) – were nephews of James Quinn, first Bishop of Brisbane (1861–1881). All three closely identified with Quinn's desire to encourage Irish Catholic immigration to rural Queensland, and to establish Catholic churches, schools, convents and presbyteries throughout the Diocese of Brisbane.

Andrew Horan served the Ipswich parish during a period of rapid immigration to Queensland and extensive agricultural settlement. All the pastoral runs in the Ipswich parish that had been taken up in the 1840s were subdivided into smaller grazing and agricultural blocks between the 1860s and the early 1900s, populated by small farming communities served by tiny rural towns. In encouraging the establishment of rural churches throughout his parish and initiating construction of the very fine St Mary's Church at Ipswich (opened in 1904) and St Brigid's Church at Rosewood (opened in 1910), Father Horan ensured that Ipswich gained renown as one of the best equipped parishes in Australia. He chose prominent, elevated, extensive sites in the belief that a Catholic display of solidarity and capability would do much to elevate the social standing of Irish Catholic immigrants. By 1904 he had encouraged construction of 14 timber churches in the districts surrounding the city of Ipswich, some of which he designed (including St Brigid's at Rosewood and St Patrick's at Rosevale).

Prior to construction of a Catholic church at Rosevale, Father Horan travelled by horseback or buggy (a journey of about five hours from Ipswich) to conduct mass in the homes of local farmers, including Patrick Quirk, Michael Kelly and Hugh Ahearn. As the Irish Catholic community at Rosevale became more established, Father Horan encouraged his parishioners to erect a local church. A block of 11 hectares (26 acres) (portion 79, parish of Rosevale, county of Churchill) selected by William O'Niell in 1878, was acquired in Andrew Horan's name in mid-1888, having cost about £80. The site was centrally located among the earliest Rosevale selections. Surrounding blocks were held by local parishioners, including Patrick, Michael and John Quirk, Hugh and Julia Ahearn, James Tierney, and James and Patrick Hogan.

The foundation stone for the new church was laid by Father Horan on 18 November 1888. The building was erected by Ipswich contractor John Madden and his son, to plans prepared by Father Horan, and was completed by early November 1889 when church and altar were blessed by Archbishop Robert Dunne, who had replaced Bishop Quinn in 1882 and who in 1887 was appointed Archbishop of Brisbane and head of the Catholic Church in Queensland. About 200 persons attended the opening ceremony and the luncheon that followed.

Built on a slight rise west of the Bremer River and on what was by then the main road to Ipswich (now the Rosewood-Aratula Road), the church overlooked farming flats from Mount Wright to the Great Dividing Range. It was a hardwood weatherboard building, 48 feet (15 m) long by 28 feet (8.5 m) wide and 12 feet (3.7 m) from floor to ceiling, set on stumps, and with a galvanised iron roof. The floor was four-inch wide tongue-and-groove hardwood boards. The building was ventilated by four pairs of lancet windows along each side, two doors in the rear wall, and the front entry doors. Simple pine forms served as seating, and there was a "very pretty" altar at the sanctuary end of the nave. There was a small vestry in the south-west corner of the interior, near the altar, created by timber partitions lower than ceiling height. The building had cost over £400 to erect and furnish.

At the opening the Archbishop also blessed the adjacent graveyard within the churchyard. In the nineteenth century it was not unusual for denominational graveyards to be established within churchyards, particularly in south-east Queensland, where a number of Catholic, Anglican and Lutheran communities consecrated graveyards alongside their church buildings. A number of these are entered in the Queensland heritage register, including St Matthews Anglican Church, Grovely at Mitchelton in Brisbane (1869); Christ Church at Tingalpa (1868) and the Lutheran Cemetery at Carbrook (1875).

With the opening of a local church, regular masses were conducted at Rosevale by visiting clergy from Ipswich. From at least the mid-1880s, Father Horan had the assistance of a number of young curates. Most prominent was James Duhig (1897–1905), who succeeded Dunne as Archbishop of Brisbane in 1917. Duhig's biographer, Father TP Boland, later wrote:

"Rosevale was the scene of Duhig's happiest associations. He enjoyed the feel of a community both Catholic and Irish growing into being Australian. All his hopes were in such a community. He wanted to recreate it everywhere. Here was the Irish race, immemorial and Catholic, emerging from the shadows into bright prosperity. The brilliant Australian sunlight on flourishing farms seemed to figure the future. The Irish were stirring and Duhig was getting the feel of their movement. Consciously or unconsciously, he was preparing to be their leader."

When the parish of Rosewood was formed in 1915, Rosevale was included as part of the new parish, in which it remains.

At an unknown period a small porch was added to the front of St Patrick's Church at Rosevale and in 1921–1922 the building was renovated with the construction of a lancet-arched sanctuary canopy and a sacristy within the building. At the same time the interior was lined, and the linings and pews were stained and varnished. The work was carried out by a local parishioner, Mr Dwyer. The renovations and additions were blessed in January 1922 by Archbishop James Duhig, who as a curate of the Ipswich parish at the turn of the century had conducted mass often at the Rosevale church. Archbishop Duhig also attended St Patrick's golden jubilee celebrations in 1939. Despite some of the early Irish families having moved to other centres by this time, the celebrations were well attended.

Some small changes to the interior of the church were made in the 1960s following Vatican II, when the communion rail was taken up and stored elsewhere in the building and the decorative timber altar was cut lengthwise in half, so that the front could be moved forward for the priest to stand behind and face the congregation.

The number of local parishioners gradually declined through the twentieth century, but at the time of assessment in 2009, the place was still being maintained by families descended from the original Irish Catholic settlers.

In the early 1990s the church land at Rosevale was subdivided, creating a local road through the property. The land north of this road was sold off, the church retaining 2.562ha south of the newly created road. This subdivision did not affect the churchyard, which was located in the south-east corner of the original portion.

== Description ==
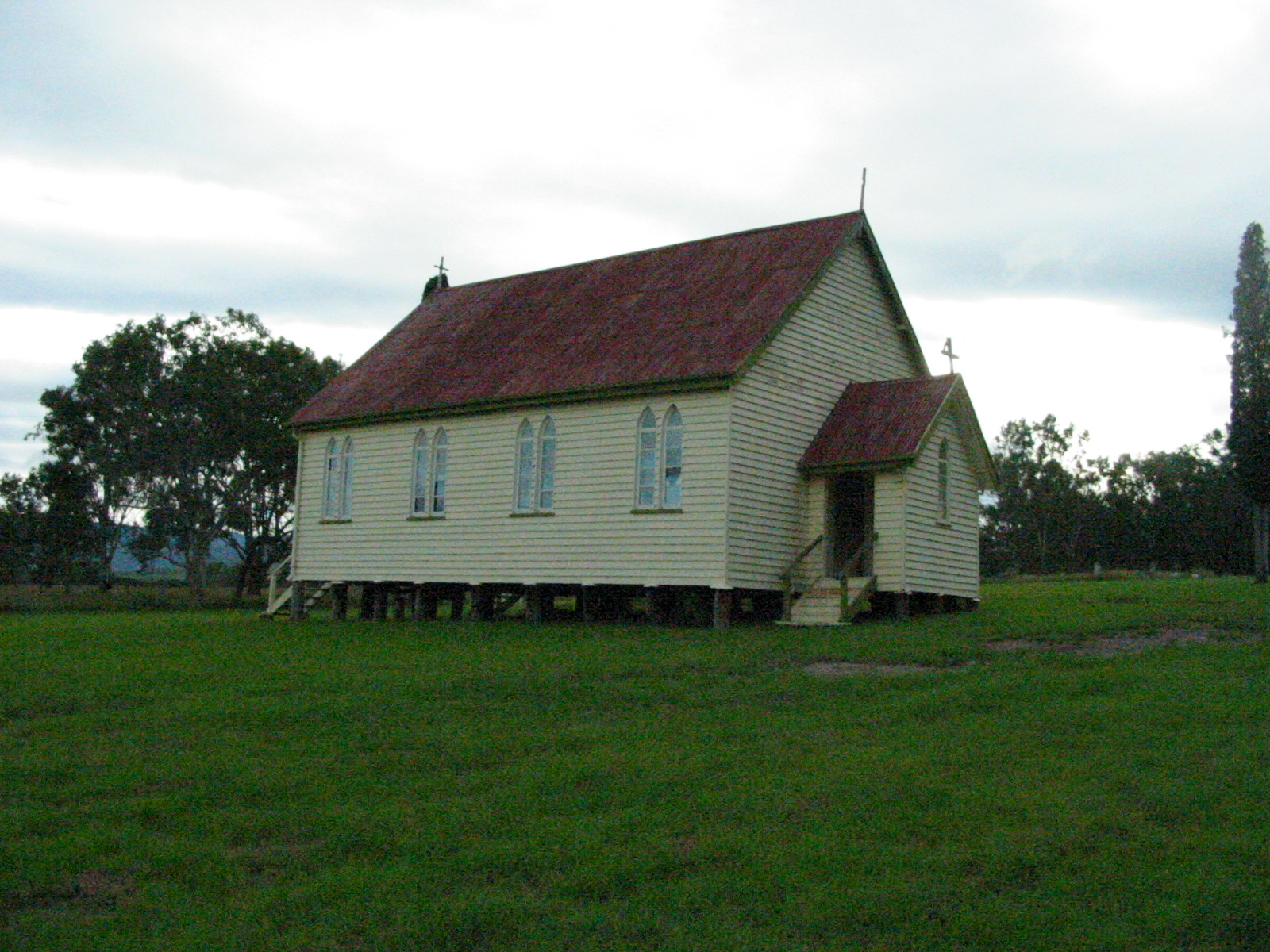
St Patricks Catholic Church, Rosevale, 2006

St Patrick's Church and graveyard is located approximately two kilometres north-west of the small township of Rosevale, in a farming district to the south-west of Ipswich. Built in 1889 at the instigation of the local Catholic community, this small timber building – with gabled roof, porch and simple gothic windows – has changed very little on its exterior. The church, graveyard and all other associated features are found at the cleared, eastern end of a long, rectangular block that slopes down towards the Rosewood-Aratula Road, which forms the eastern boundary of the property. A gate here provides vehicular access. The remainder of the property is covered in ironbark scrub and fenced off by a timber post and barbed wire fence. The northern boundary is defined by Dawson Road (unsealed) and lined with trees, while the southern boundary adjoins open farmland.

The church is a simple single-storey timber building measuring approximately fifteen metres long by nine metres wide, raised on timber ant-capped stumps. Orientated north-south, it has a gable roof and a small, gabled porch on the northern facade. It is positioned approximately one third of the way up the slope of the cleared area adjacent to two cypress (possibly Cupressus sempervirens or Italian Cypress) trees, a pine tree (possibly Pinus elliottii or slash pine) and a small timber outhouse behind it to the west and south-west. The middle third of the site is open grass with no visible features, while the western third at the top of the slope contains the grouped, marked graves of the burial ground and three separate graves in the far south-west corner. The only other tree within the fenced churchyard is a mature ironbark, near the northern boundary.

The church is timber-framed and clad with painted weatherboards. The gable roof is clad in corrugated iron with the ridge at each end having a simple wooden cross attached to it, one of the few decorative features found on the exterior. The church sits on a regular grid of timber stumps which, due to the slope of the site, vary in height so that the western edge of the building sits closest to ground level. The main entrance is through a small timber porch on the northern facade. A third timber cross, Celtic in style, decorates the top, outer end of the porch gable.

The main northern facade has few decorative features, apart from the small porch addition, which has a single window with a fixed, pointed-arch top light in the centre of its north-facing wall. The east and west facades are identical, featuring four sets of tall paired casement windows spaced equally along their length. Each window has four rectangular lights and a fixed pointed-arch top light. The south (rear) facade has two doors at each end that are accessed by timber steps with timber handrails. A recent PVC water tank sits on an old timber tank stand between these two doors.

The entry porch has openings facing east and west, accessed by timber steps. A timber pew has been placed along the northern wall as a seat. The large main door into the church itself is made from red cedar boards. Opening inwards, its two leaves have tops that form a pointed arch. Beyond this door, the central aisle runs through the nave towards the altar at the far end and is formed by rows of pews placed on either side. Two small rooms (a vestry and a sacristy) have been enclosed by timber-framed partitions on either side of the altar, with a pointed-arch ceiling spanning between them and forming a canopy above the sanctuary. Floors throughout are lined with timber boards with a single strip of red carpet running down the central aisle.

The ceiling over the nave is lined with wide, beaded timber boards painted white. Various members of the timber roof trusses project through the lining, including the tie beams and scissor braces. Brackets on the walls and black stains on the underside of the scissor braces that extend to meet the walls indicate the former use of kerosene lamps to light the church. Light fittings now hang from overhead tie beams. Wall linings in the nave date from the 1922 renovation. From floor level to waist height, they are lined with narrow vertical boards, topped with a dado rail. All are stained. Above this, they are lined with plywood sheets with cover strips, stained an orange-brown. Framed Stations of the Cross are spaced along the east, north and west walls, each with a small plaque naming the family that donated it. In the north-west corner is a stand-alone confessional made from dark-stained silky oak. In the north-east corner is a small timber pedal organ (no longer in use) that was manufactured by Mason & Hamlin, Boston, U.S.A. The early timber pews are made from pine and stained a dark brown.

The altar sits upon a raised platform in the sanctuary in the centre of the southern wall. Made from polished silky oak, intricately carved with floral patterns and religious motifs in relief, the altar was adapted to the liturgical changes brought about by Vatican II in the mid to late 1960s by being cut in two; allowing the priest to face his congregation using the front half shifted forward. The communion rail was also removed and is stored in the eastern side room (sacristy). Attached to the wall behind the rear portion of the altar is original wall ornamentation, namely a timber pointed arch surmounted by a plain cross, painted in white. A small statue of St Patrick sits on a narrow ledge at the front of the altar. The lower, arched ceiling over the altar is made from plywood sheets with cover strips and was added in 1922.

Facing the sanctuary on either side are doorways that open into the vestry and sacristy. Both rooms have doors to the exterior in the rear wall of the building. Their walls are clad in vertical timber boards (single-beaded for the vestry walls but narrower and without beading for the sacristy) and have an open frieze of vertical battens above door height. Semi-circular alcove shrines are built into the northern walls of both these rooms, facing the congregation. The western alcove houses a statue of the Virgin Mary. The eastern alcove contains a statue of the Sacred Heart of Jesus, while next to it is a statue of St Joseph on a separate triangular shelf.

Most of the marked graves in the church graveyard are grouped together in rows and aligned east–west. Approximately 68 names are recorded and dates range from the earliest in 1887 (an infant, Willy Hogan, whose name is included on a headstone with other family members) to the most recent in 2009. Dates on the headstones indicate that burials were taking place consistently from when the graveyard was first opened, peaking in the 1920s and 1930s, before declining in use after World War II; however since the 1990s burial numbers have been increasing. Headstones are made in a variety of styles and materials, some elaborate. Of note are an elaborately carved Celtic cross and several plots enclosed with wrought iron fencing. Older headstones tend to be made from marble and several have been broken. Families are generally buried together in a family plot or adjacent separate plots. Stonemasons recorded on some of the headstone include Ziegler of Toowoomba and F Williams of Ipswich. Recent burials are located along the western edge of the graveyard or in reserved family plots, and are usually marked with sandstone or concrete blocks with a granite plaque attached.

In the far south-west corner of the fenced churchyard are three graves marked by timber crosses and iron grave markers, said to be members of the Quirk family. The graves were once enclosed by a timber fence which has since collapsed leaving only the vertical corner posts.

Extensive and picturesque views of farmland and distant mountain ranges to the east and south are obtained from all over the site. The church itself, fronted by sloping grass lawns and set against a dark background of trees, also has picturesque qualities, especially when glimpsed in passing along the Rosewood-Aratula Road.

== Heritage listing ==
St Patrick's Church and Graveyard was listed on the Queensland Heritage Register on 11 December 2009 having satisfied the following criteria.

The place is important in demonstrating the evolution or pattern of Queensland's history.

St Patrick's Church and Graveyard, established in 1889 at Rosevale in south-east Queensland, is of particular significance for its association with a strongly Irish Catholic community which, at the turn of the nineteenth century and twentieth century, inspired in Ipswich curate Father James Duhig, later the influential Archbishop of Brisbane and head of the Catholic Church in Queensland (1917–1965), a vision for the future of Irish Catholic settlement in this State. Although this largely Irish community was established as early as the 1870s, unlike many other Irish groups which by the twentieth century had dispersed into the wider community, Rosevale's sense of being an Irish enclave and a successful "little Ireland" transplanted to Queensland was sustained well into the 1930s. According to his biographer, for James Duhig the Rosevale Catholic community, centred on its simple timber church, epitomised the successes and possibilities of rural Irish Catholic enterprise. The church and its accompanying graveyard remain strong testimony of early Irish rural settlement in Queensland.

The place is important in demonstrating the principal characteristics of a particular class of cultural places.

St Patrick's Church and Graveyard remains highly intact and is important in demonstrating the principal characteristics of a modest, late nineteenth century rural church complex comprising a simple timber church building, a separate outside earth closet, fenced churchyard with wide grassed areas and some trees, and graveyard. Set picturesquely on a slight rise overlooking a farming district, the place retains its early setting, extent, form, fabric and function, and is an excellent example of its type. The interior of the church building retains most of its early fixtures, fittings and furniture (1880s–1920s).
