= Coleyville, Queensland =

Coleyville
- Suburb
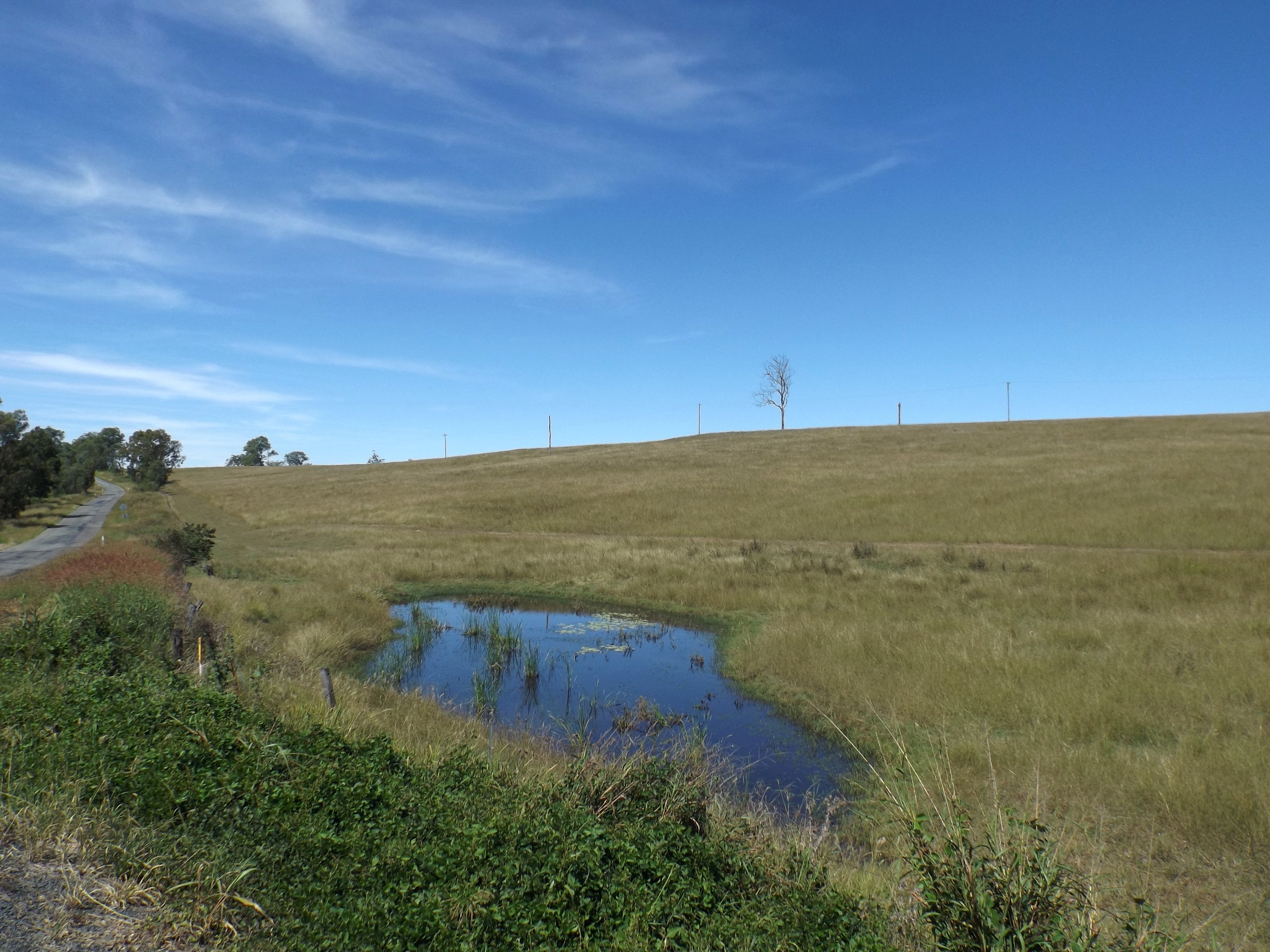
- Fields along Rosewood Warrill View Road, 2015

- Interactive map of Coleyville
- Coordinates: 27.8036°S 152.5888°E
- Country: Australia
- State: Queensland
- LGA: Scenic Rim Region
- Location: 26.5 km (16.5 mi) S of Rosewood; 36.7 km (22.8 mi) NNW of Boonah; 67.1 km (41.7 mi) NW of Beaudesert; 72.1 km (44.8 mi) SW of Brisbane

Government
  - State electorate: Scenic Rim
  - Federal division: Wright

Area
  - Total: 39.7 km^{2} (15.3 sq mi)
- Elevation: 65 m (213 ft)

Population
  - Total: 192 (2021 census)
  - Density: 4.836/km^{2} (12.53/sq mi)
- Time zone: UTC+10:00 (AEST)
- Postcode: 4307
Suburbs around Coleyville
Mount Walker	Mount Forbes	Mutdapilly
Mount Walker	Coleyville	Harrisville
Rosevale	Rosevale	Warrill View

Coleyville is a rural locality in the Scenic Rim Region, Queensland, Australia. In the 2021 census, Coleyville had a population of 192 people.

== Geography ==
In the east of Coleyville elevations rise towards the summit of Mount Walker. Mount Walker Creek, a tributary of Warrill Creek, is the main waterway in the locality. The land, like most parts of the Fassifern Valley, is mainly used for agricultural purposes.

== History ==
The locality is named after settlers Philemon and Sylvia Coley. in 1866 the couple emigrated from Halesowen, Worcestershire, England, and settled in the area.

Coleyville Provisional opened on 21 July 1890, On 1 January 1909 it became Coleyville State School. It closed in 1926 due to low attendances, but reopened in 1928. It closed permanently in 1964. It was located at 1080 Coleyville Road (27.8154°S 152.5646°E).

== Demographics ==
In the 2011 census, Coleyville and surrounds recorded a population of 392 people.

In the 2016 census, Coleyville had a population of 185 people. The locality contains 55 households, in which 50.0% of the population are males and 50.0% of the population are females with a median age of 45, 7 years above the national average. The average weekly household income is $1,812, $374 above the national average. 4.8% of Coleyville's population is either of Aborigional or Torres Strait Islander descent. 65.9% of the population aged 15 or over is either registered or de facto married, while 33.1% of the population is not married. 31.2% of the population is currently attending some form of a compulsory education. The most common nominated ancestries were Australian (31.3%), English (31.3%) and German (13.6%), while the most common country of birth was Australia (85.6%), and the most commonly spoken language at home was English (87.4%). The most common nominated religions were No religion (19.9%), Anglican (18.8%) and the Churches of Christ (16.5%). The most common occupation was a manager (19.2%) and the majority/plurality of residents worked 40 or more hours per week (52.9%).

In the 2021 census, Coleyville had a population of 192 people.

== Education ==
There are no schools in Coleyville. The nearest government primary schools are Mutdapilly State School in neighbouring Mutdapilly to the north-east and Warrill View State School in neighbouring Warrill View to the south-east. The nearest government secondary school is Rosewood State High School in Rosewood to the north.

== Facilities ==
Coleyville Cemetery is on Coleyville Cemetery Road (27.8014°S 152.5690°E).
