= Mount Mort, Queensland =

Mount Mort
- Suburb
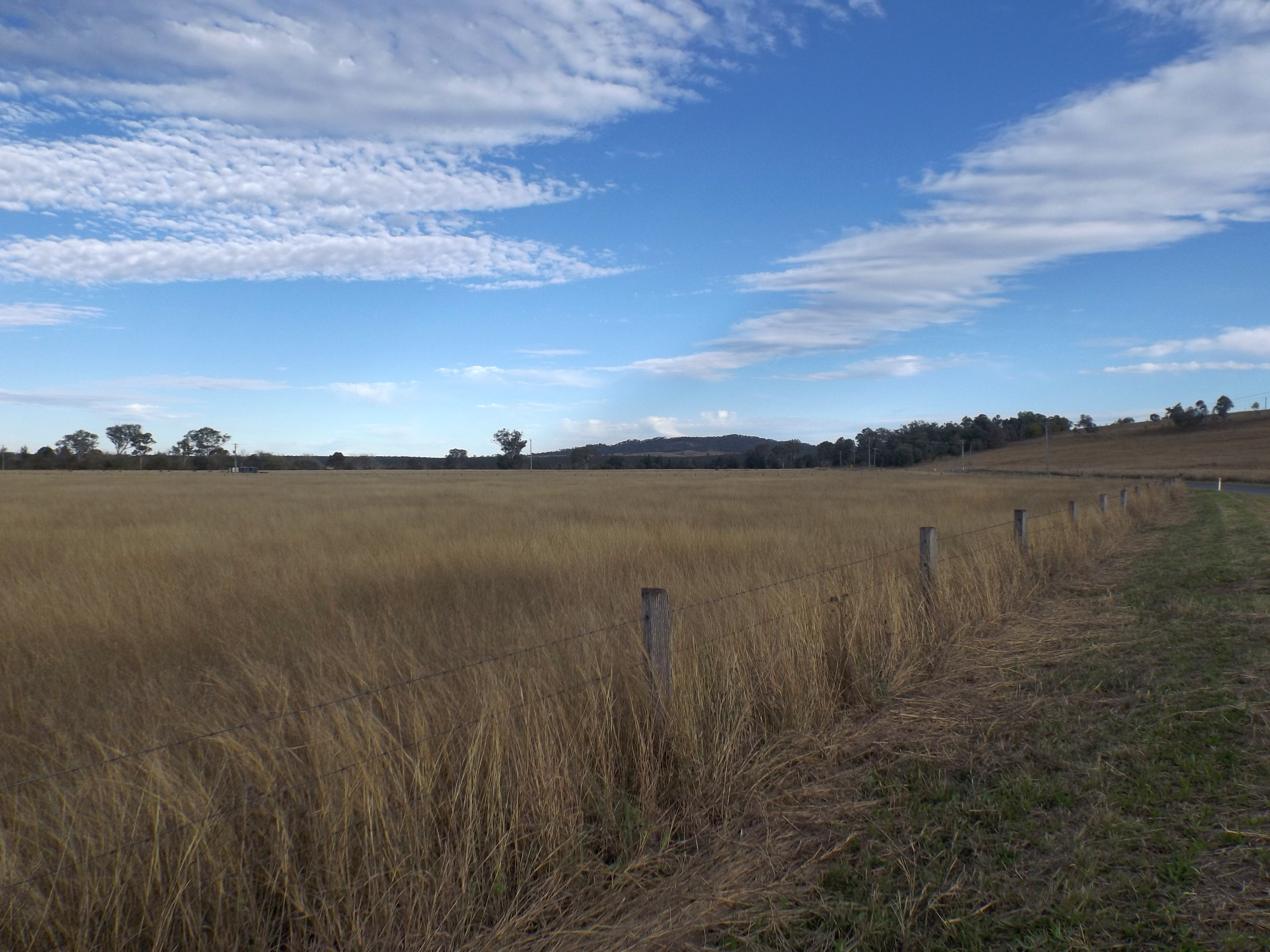
- Fields along Grandchester Mount Mort Road, 2015

- Interactive map of Mount Mort
- Coordinates: 27.7855°S 152.4377°E
- Country: Australia
- State: Queensland
- City: Ipswich
- LGA: City of Ipswich
- Location: 25.3 km (15.7 mi) S of Laidley; 25.5 km (15.8 mi) SW of Rosewood; 49.3 km (30.6 mi) SW of Ipswich CBD; 90.7 km (56.4 mi) WSW of Brisbane

Government
  - State electorate: Scenic Rim
  - Federal division: Blair

Area
  - Total: 102.0 km^{2} (39.4 sq mi)

Population
  - Total: 78 (2021 census)
  - Density: 0.765/km^{2} (1.981/sq mi)
- Time zone: UTC+10:00 (AEST)
- Postcode: 4340
Suburbs around Mount Mort
Mulgowie	Grandchester	Lower Mount Walker
Thornton	Mount Mort	Mount Walker West
Townson	Rosevale	Merryvale

Mount Mort, formerly known as Gehrkevale (German: [ˈɡeːʁkəveɪl] GAIR-kuh-vayl), is a rural locality in the City of Ipswich, Queensland, Australia. In the 2021 census, Mount Mort had a population of 78 people.

== Geography ==
The locality has a number of mountain features, including (from north to south):

- Red Gap (27.7626°S 152.3998°E)
- Edwards Gap (27.7679°S 152.3914°E)
- Mount Grey (27.8333°S 152.4311°E)

Franklin Vale Creek rises in the south-east of the locality and flows north through the locality exiting to the north (Grandchester).

The Liverpool Range runs near and through the western boundary of the locality with elevations over 600 metres (2,000 ft), compared to elevations of 100 to 150 metres (330 to 490 ft) along the valley of Franklin Vale Creek.

Beau Brummel Conservation Park is in the west of the locality. Apart from this protected area, the land use is predominantly grazing on native vegetation with some forestry and crop growing.

Grandchester - Mount Mort Road enters the locality from the north (Grandchester) and travels south through the lower-lying areas of the locality to the west of the creek and terminates within the south of the locality.

== History ==
In 1877, 48,000 acres (19,000 ha) were resumed from the Franklyn Vale pastoral run and offered for selection on 17 April 1877.

The locality was originally known as Gehrkevale after Carl Frederick Wilhelm Gehrke who purchased 100 acres (40 ha) circa 1881 and subsequently purchased a further 630 acres (250 ha). However, during World War I due to anti-German sentiment, the name was changed to Mount Mort, after the Mort family who settled there in 1849. Despite the locality name, there is no mountain by that name.

Gehrkevale Provisional School opened on 18 January 1904. On 1 January 1909, it became Gehrkevale State School. In May 1917, it was renamed Mount Mort State School. It closed temporarily between 1947 and 1949 due to low student numbers. It closed permanently on 18 September 1959. It was at 4 Alpers Road (27.80248°S 152.42483°E).

== Demographics ==
In the 2016 census, Mount Mort had a population of 91 people.

In the 2021 census, Mount Mort had a population of 78 people.

== Heritage listings ==
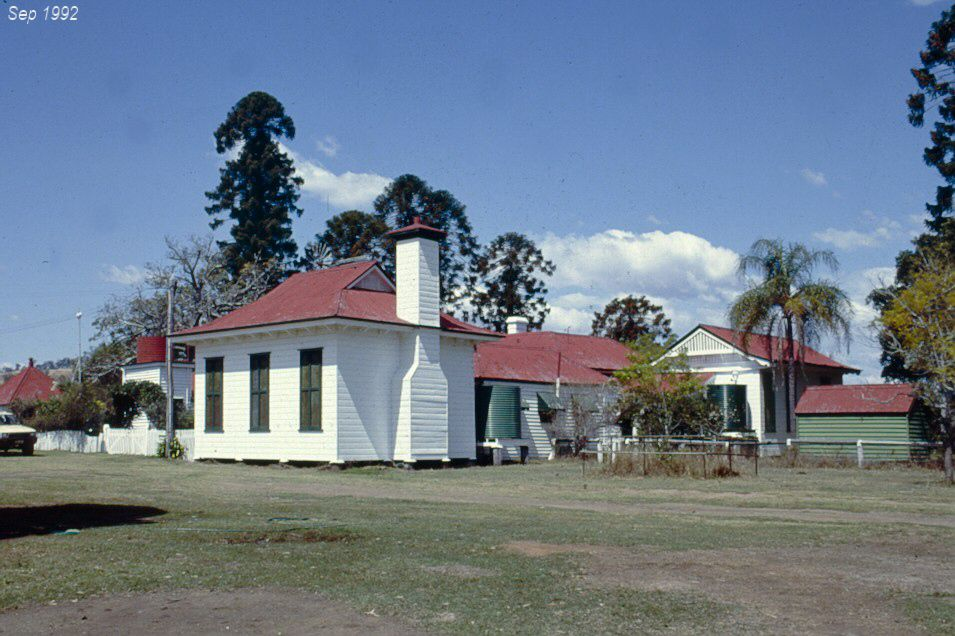
Franklyn Vale Homestead, 1992

Mount Mort has a number of heritage-listed sites, including:

- Franklyn Vale Homestead, Franklin Vale Road (27.7596°S 152.4564°E)

== Education ==
There are no schools in Mount Mort. The nearest government primary schools are Grandchester State School in neighbouring Grandchester to the north and Warrill View State School in Warrill View to the east. The nearest government secondary schools are Laidley State High School in Laidley to the north-west and Rosewood State High School in Rosewood to the north-east.

== See also ==
- List of Australian place names changed from German names
