= Rosevale, Queensland =

Rosevale
- Town
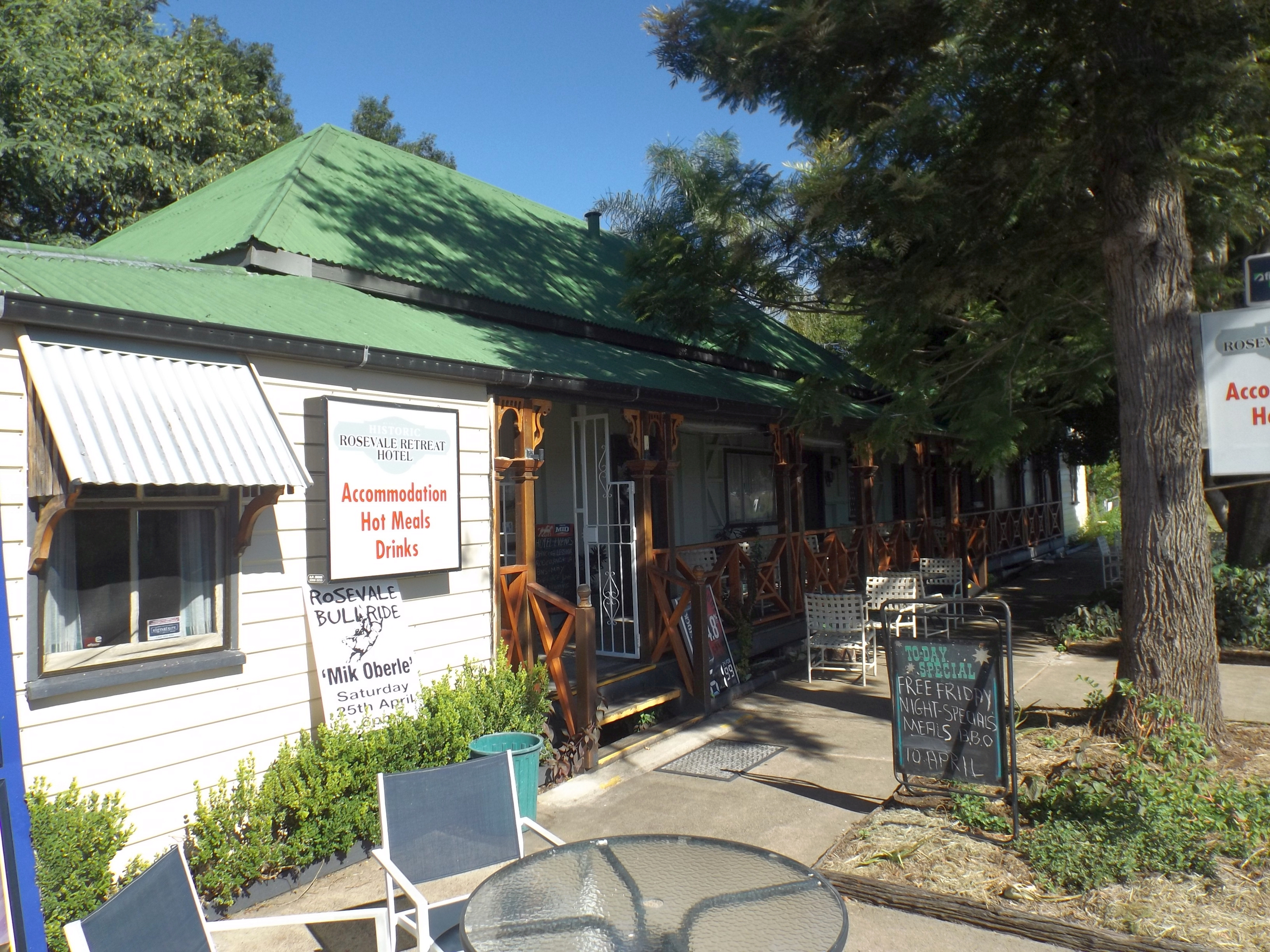
- Rosevale Retreat Hotel, 2015

- Interactive map of Rosevale
- Coordinates: 27.8594°S 152.4916°E
- Country: Australia
- State: Queensland
- LGA: Scenic Rim Region
- Location: 33.4 km (20.8 mi) SW of Rosewood; 42.1 km (26.2 mi) NW of Boonah; 51.5 km (32.0 mi) SW of Ipswich; 78.9 km (49.0 mi) WNW of Beaudesert; 90.5 km (56.2 mi) SW of Brisbane

Government
  - State electorate: Scenic Rim
  - Federal divisions: Wright; Blair

Area
  - Total: 133.7 km^{2} (51.6 sq mi)
- Elevation: 105 m (344 ft)

Population
  - Total: 212 (2021 census)
  - Density: 1.586/km^{2} (4.107/sq mi)
- Time zone: UTC+10:00 (AEST)
- Postcode: 4340
Localities around Rosevale
Mount Mort; Merryvale	Mount Walker West; Mount Walker	Coleyville
Townson	Rosevale	Warrill View; Silverdale
Moorang	Frazerview	Frazerview

Rosevale is a rural locality in the Scenic Rim Region, Queensland, Australia. In the 2021 census, the locality of Rosevale had a population of 212 people.

== Geography ==
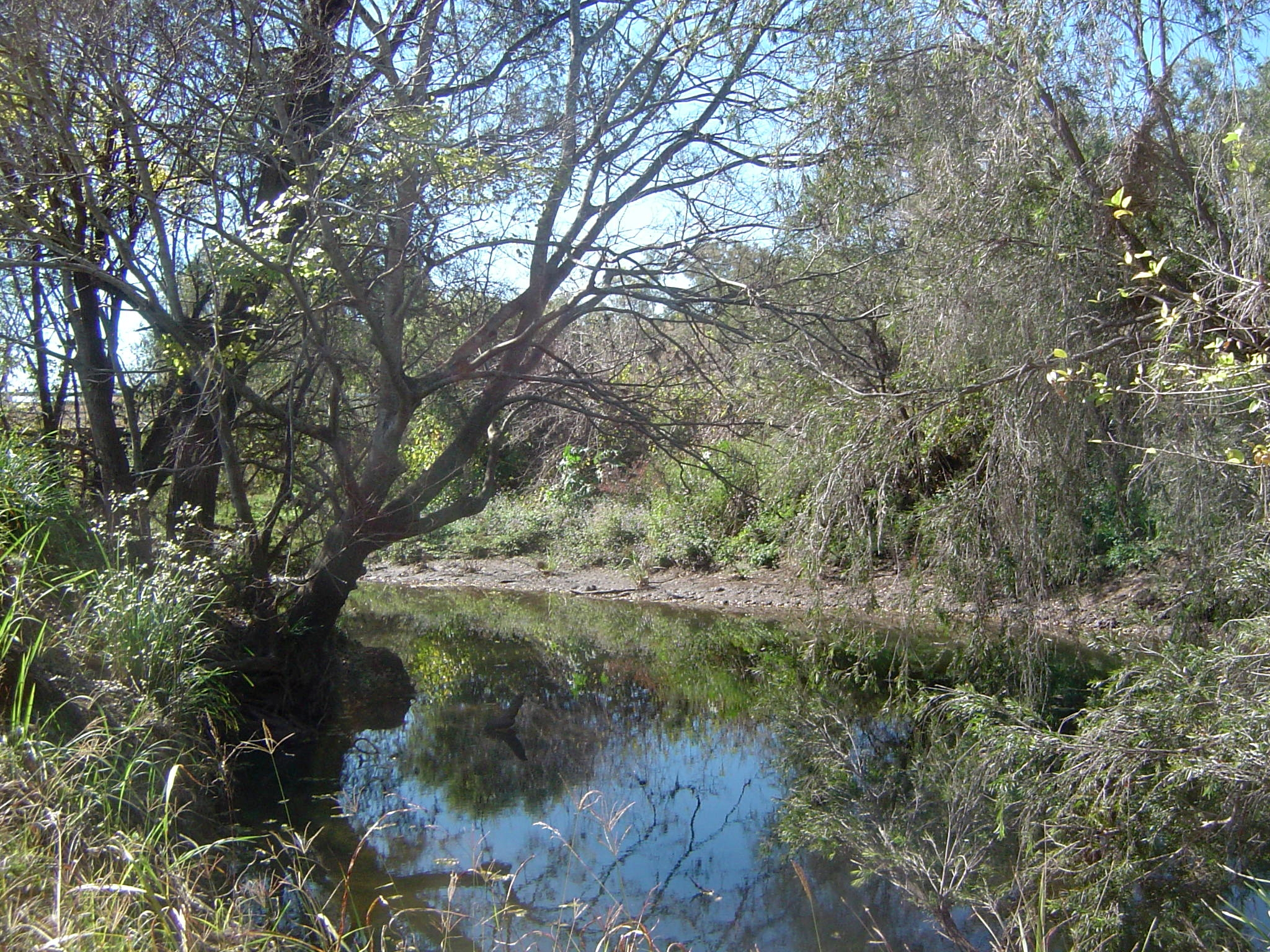
Bremer River, 2011

The Bremer River enters the locality from the south-west (Moorang) and exits to the north (Mount Walker West / Mount Walker).

== History ==
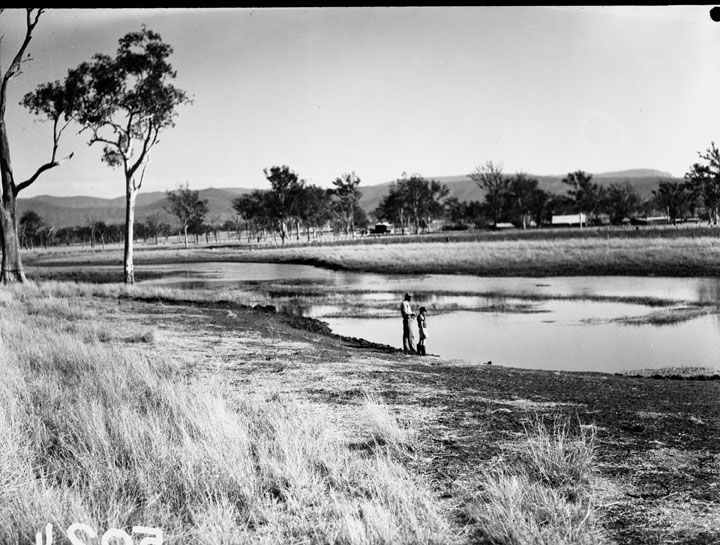
Spring fed waterhole, 1954

The name Rosevale is a corruption of Rossvale, the name of a pastoral run pastoral used first in 1850s by William Ross.

The Rosevale Retreat Hotel was built in 1852 as a homestead and is the state's oldest hotel building. A victualler's licence was granted in 1887 to a Matthew Carmody. The hotel closed in 2015.

Rosevale State School opened 24 November 1884. It was mothballed on 31 December 2009 and closed on 31 December 2010. The school was located at 628 Sellars Road (corner of Tierneys Bridge Road, 27.8466°S 152.4824°E). The school's website was archived.

St Stephen's Anglican Church was opened circa 1887. The church closed circa 1962.

Rosevale has previously belonged to the Shire of Mutdapilly, Shire of Moreton and the Shire of Boonah local government areas.

The Lutheran church burned down in 1928. In 1929 the Congregational Church in Peak Crossing was to be replaced so the former church building was purchased and relocated to Rosevale to become the new Lutheran church.

For a detailed history of the district see St Patrick's Church, Rosevale#History.

== Demographics ==
In the 2011 census, the locality of Rosevale had a population of 268 people.

In the 2016 census, the locality of Rosevale had a population of 208 people.

In the 2021 census, the locality of Rosevale had a population of 212 people.

== Heritage listings ==
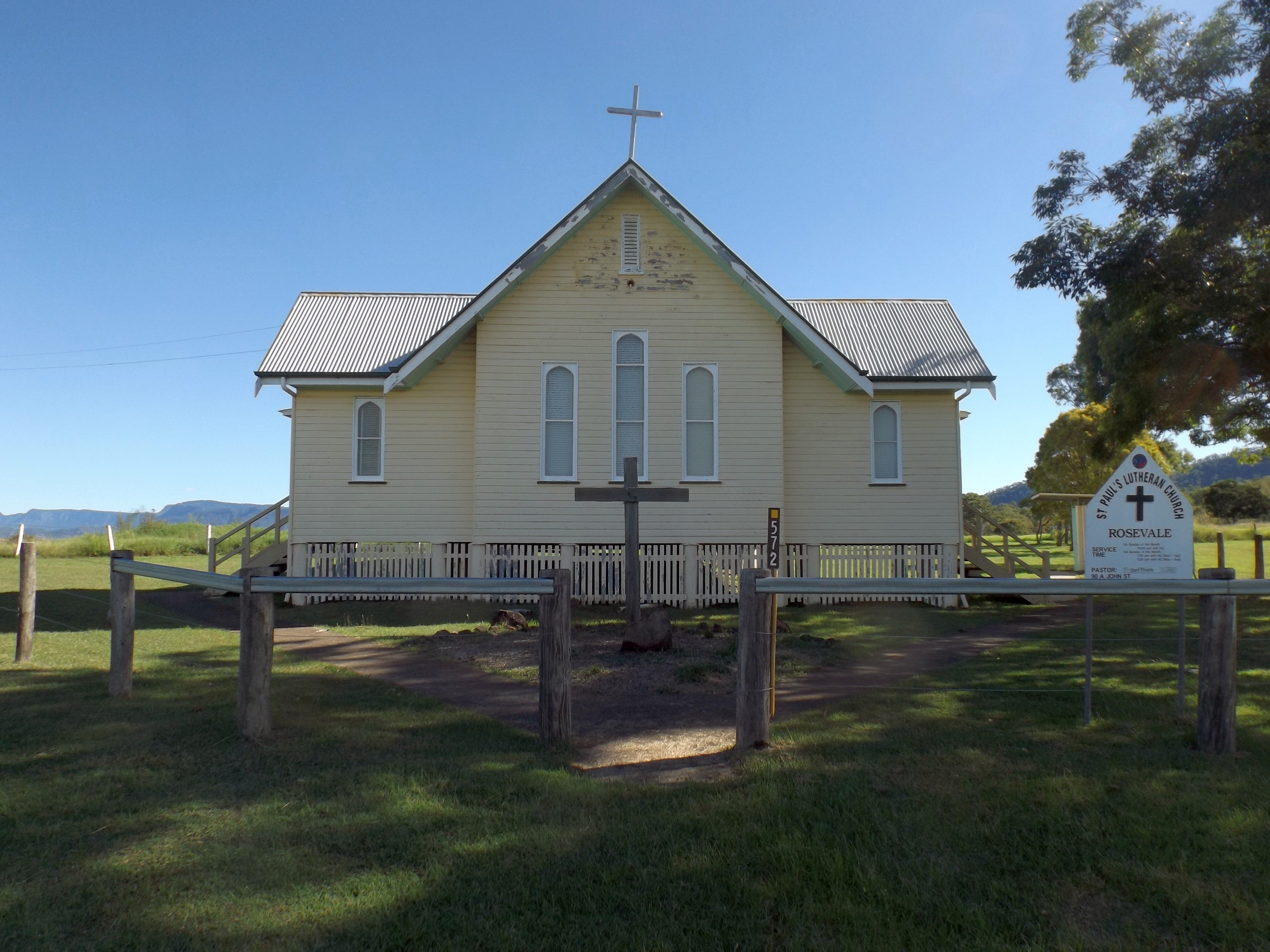
St Paul's Lutheran Church, 2015

Rosevale has a number of heritage-listed sites, including:

- St Patrick's Catholic Church and Graveyard, Rosewood–Aratula Road (27.8502°S 152.4786°E)
- St Paul's Lutheran Church, 572 Rosevale Road (27.8344°S 152.4849°E)
- Rosevale Retreat Hotel, 903 Rosevale Road (27.8624°S 152.4765°E)

== Education ==
There are no schools in Rosevale. The nearest government primary schools are Warrill View State School in neighbouring Warrill View to the east and Aratula State School in Aratula to the south. The nearest government secondary schools are Rosewood State High School in Rosewood to the north and Boonah State High School in Boonah to the south-east.
