= Mount Forbes, Queensland =

Mount Forbes
- Suburb
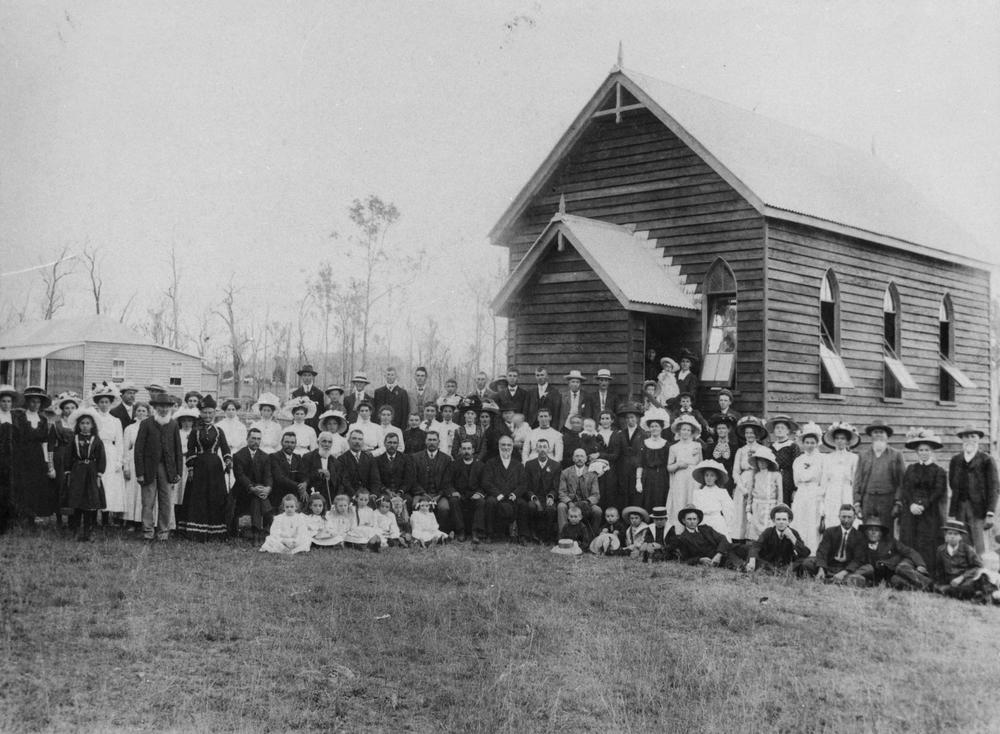
- Opening of the Mount Forbes Methodist Church, 1911

- Interactive map of Mount Forbes
- Coordinates: 27.7375°S 152.6117°E
- Country: Australia
- State: Queensland
- City: City of Ipswich
- LGAs: City of Ipswich; Scenic Rim Region
- Location: 26.6 km (16.5 mi) SW of Ipswich; 43.7 km (27.2 mi) N of Boonah; 64.4 km (40.0 mi) SW of Brisbane CBD; 71.0 km (44.1 mi) NW of Beaudesert

Government
  - State electorate: Scenic Rim
  - Federal divisions: Wright; Blair

Area
  - Total: 39.6 km^{2} (15.3 sq mi)

Population
  - Total: 262 (2021 census)
  - Density: 6.616/km^{2} (17.14/sq mi)
- Time zone: UTC+10:00 (AEST)
- Postcode: 4340
Suburbs around Mount Forbes
Lower Mount Walker	Ebenezer	Willowbank
Lower Mount Walker	Mount Forbes	Mutdapilly
Mount Walker	Coleyville	Mutdapilly

Mount Forbes is a rural locality split between the City of Ipswich and the Scenic Rim Region, Queensland, Australia. In the 2021 census, Mount Forbes had a population of 262 people.

== Geography ==
There is a mountain in the south-east of the locality, known as The Sugarloaf (27.7473°S 152.6351°E), rising to 74 metres (243 ft).

The land use is predominantly grazing on native vegetation.

== History ==
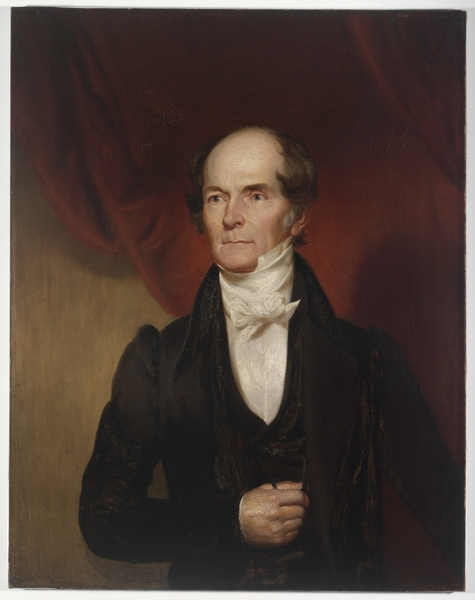
Francis Forbes

John Oxley chose the name Mount Forbes in 1824, after Sir Francis Forbes (1784-1841) the then Chief Justice of New South Wales to name the mountain now known as Mount Walker.

Mount Forbes Post Office opened on 1 July 1927 (a receiving office had been open from 1897) and closed in 1953.

Mount Forbes Provisional School opened on 10 November 1896. On 1 January 1909, it became Mount Forbes State School. It closed in 1948. It was at 222 Mount Forbes School Road (27.7388°S 152.6152°E).

Tenders were called in September 1910 to build a Methodist church. The stump-capping ceremony was held on Saturday 18 February 1911. Mount Forbes Methodist Church was officially opened on Sunday 7 May 1911 by Dr Henry Youngman, the President of the Methodist Church of Australasia; about 200 people attended. The timber church was 24 by 16 feet (7.3 by 4.9 m) and 11 feet (3.4 m) high with an iron roof; it could seat 100 people. It was designed by Thomas Freeman Theaker and built by Jacob Hoffman for £89/18/9. The church was at 211-215 Mount Forbes School Road (27.7380°S 152.6154°E).

In October 1994, the Woogaroo Koala Protection Society was established, being renamed Ipswich Koala Protection Society in 2000 as the group expanded its services to a wider area. A dedicated koala rehabilitation clinic was established in Mount Forbes in 2010.

== Demographics ==
In the 2016 census, Mount Forbes had a population of 263 people. The locality contains 93 households, in which 50.0% of the population are males and 50.0% of the population are females with a median age of 35, 3 years below the national average. The average weekly household income is $1,520, $83 above the national average. 3.0% of Mount Forbes's population is either of Aboriginal or Torres Strait Islander descent. 70.5% of the population aged 15 or over is either registered or de facto married, while 29.5% of the population is not married. 34.3% of the population is currently attending some form of a compulsory education. The most common nominated ancestries were Australian (35.7%), English (27.5%) and German (9.9%), while the most common country of birth was Australia (78.7%), and the most commonly spoken language at home was English (83.3%). The most common nominated religions were No religion (24.3%), Not stated (20.6%) and Anglican (14.7%). The most common occupation was a technician/trades worker (17.6%) and the majority/plurality of residents worked 40 or more hours per week (46.3%).

In the 2021 census, Mount Forbes had a population of 262 people.

== Education ==
There are no schools in Mount Forbes. The nearest government primary schools are Mutdapilly State School in neighbouring Mutdapilly to the south-east and Rosewood State School in Rosewood to the north. The nearest government secondary school is Rosewood State High School in Rosewood to the north.

== Amenities ==
The Ipswich Koala Protection Society is at 110 Brass Road (27.7095°S 152.6145°E). It has two ambulances designed for koalas and rescues over 180 koalas each year. It provides care for sick, injured or orphaned koalas with the aim of rehabilitating them and returning them to the wild.
