= Merryvale, Queensland =

Merryvale
- Suburb
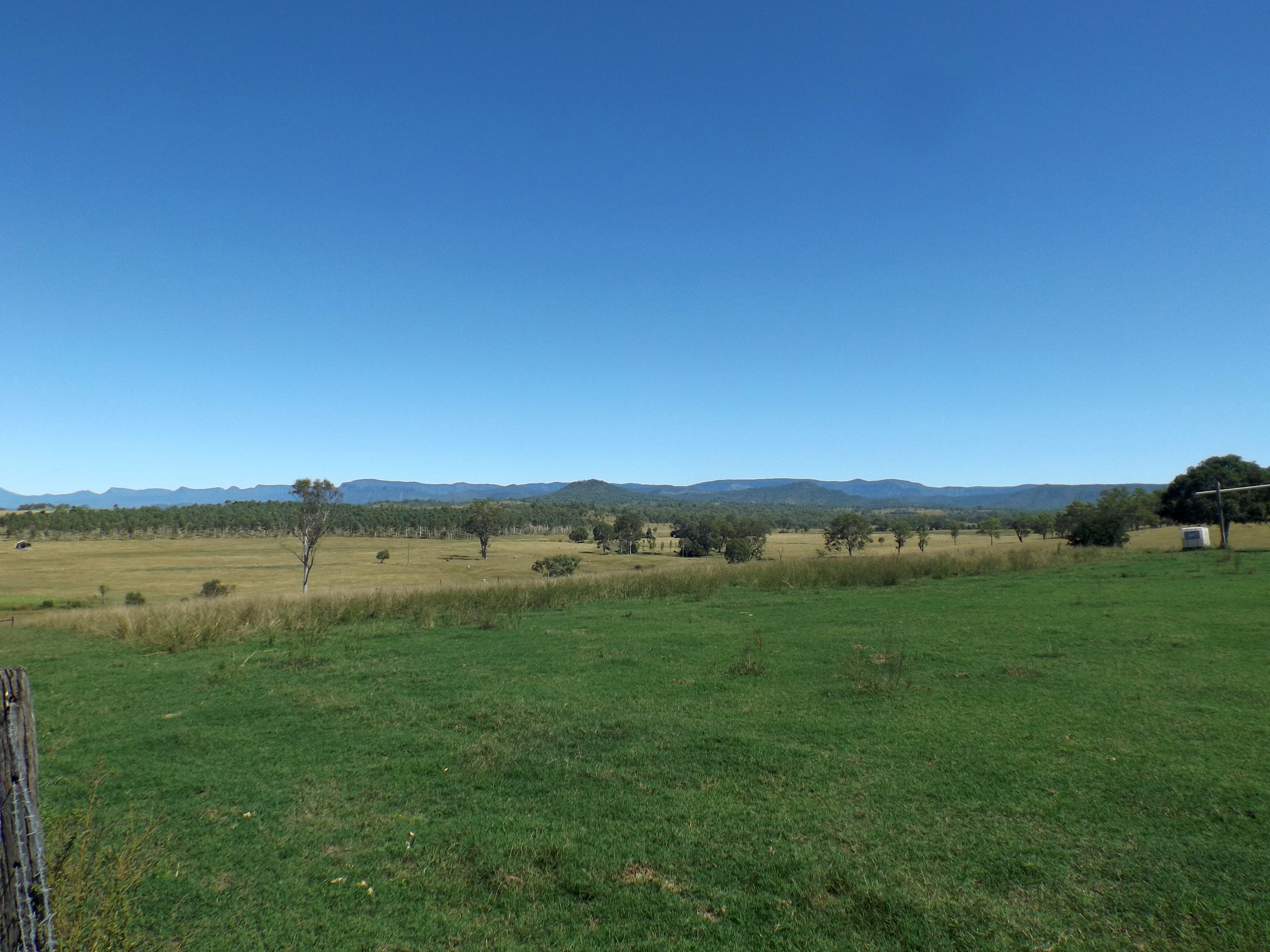
- Fields along Mount Walker West Road, 2015

- Interactive map of Merryvale
- Coordinates: 27.7972°S 152.4838°E
- Country: Australia
- State: Queensland
- LGA: Scenic Rim Region
- Location: 42.5 km (26.4 mi) SW of Ipswich; 49.8 km (30.9 mi) NW of Boonah; 80.3 km (49.9 mi) NW of Beaudesert; 82.1 km (51.0 mi) SW of Brisbane CBD

Government
  - State electorate: Scenic Rim
  - Federal division: Wright

Area
  - Total: 9.8 km^{2} (3.8 sq mi)

Population
  - Total: 32 (2021 census)
  - Density: 3.27/km^{2} (8.46/sq mi)
- Time zone: UTC+10:00 (AEST)
- Postcode: 4340
Suburbs around Merryvale
| Mount Mort | Mount Walker West | Mount Walker West |
| Mount Mort | Merryvale | Mount Walker West |
| Rosevale | Rosevale | Rosevale |

Merryvale is a rural locality in the Scenic Rim Region, Queensland, Australia. In the 2021 census, Merryvale had a population of 32 people.

== Geography ==
Merryvale is a predominantly agricultural area.

== History ==
Merryvale Provisional School opened on 10 September 1894. It closed in 1904 due to low enrolment, and was relocated and reopened on 5 March 1906 as Franklyn Vale Provisional School. On 1 January 1909, it became Franklyn Vale Provisional School, but again closed in 1915 due to low attendance. In 1922, it was moved back to Merryvale, reopening on 15 May 1922 as Merryvale State School. It celebrated its 50th jubilee on 7 August 1947. It closed again in 1950, reopened, then finally closed in 1961. It was on the north side of Greys Plains Road (approx 27.80094°S 152.47375°E.

== Demographics ==
In the 2016 census, Merryvale had a population of 22, in nine households. Its male/female populations were 52.0% and 48.0%, respectively, with a median age of 34, four years below the national average.

In the 2021 census, Merryvale had a population of 32 people.

== Education ==
There are no schools in Merryvale. The nearest government primary school is Warrill View State School in Warrill View to the east. The nearest government secondary school is Rosewood State High School in Rosewood to the north-east.
