= Franklyn Vale Homestead =

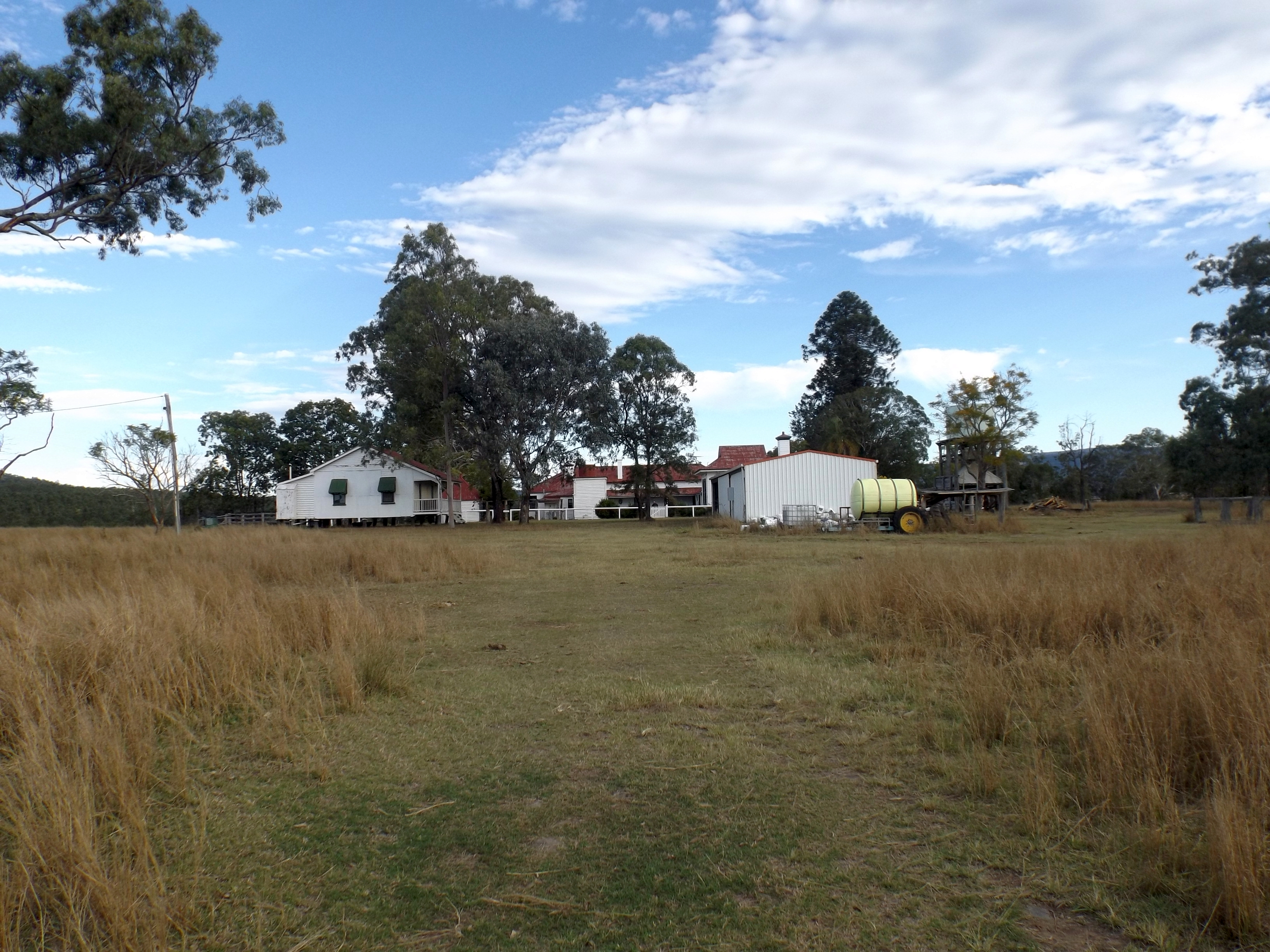
- Building in 2015

- Location within Queensland Location within Australia
- 27.7596°S 152.4564°E
- Location: Franklin Vale Road, Mount Mort, City of Ipswich, Queensland, Australia

Site notes
- Architect(s): Addison & Corrie, Robin Dods

Queensland Heritage Register
- Official name: Franklyn Vale Homestead
- Type: state heritage (landscape, built)
- Designated: 21 October 1992
- Reference no.: 600728
- Significant period: 1870s–1890s (historical)
- Significant components: trees/plantings, garden/grounds, out building/s, tennis court, tank stand, meat house, shed/s, residential accommodation – main house, kitchen/kitchen house, school/school room

Franklyn Vale Homestead is a heritage-listed homestead at Franklin Vale Road, Mount Mort, City of Ipswich, Queensland, Australia. It was built in the early 1870s. It was added to the Queensland Heritage Register on 21 October 1992.

== History ==
The present Franklyn Vale Homestead was erected in the early 1870s for Mr & Mrs Edward Crace, son-in-law and daughter of Henry Mort, the owner of the property. It replaced an 1849 slab dwelling, which then was used as a stables until demolished c.1949.

Originally, Franklyn Vale Station was part of the 60,000 hectares (150,000 acres) Laidley Plains leasehold which, along with Beau Desert, was taken up as a sheep run in 1843 by NSW squatter JP Robinson. The Laidley Plains run extended across the Franklin Valley, named after Sir John Franklin, Lieutenant-Governor of Van Diemen's Land 1837–43, and identified on Dixon's 1842 map of the Moreton Bay district.

In 1849 the lease and 13,000 sheep passed to Sydney businessman Thomas Sutcliffe Mort. His brother, Henry Jonathan Mort, who had been managing Cressbrook Station in the Brisbane River Valley for DC McConnel, then moved onto Laidley Plains as manager. In the early 1850s Henry began the conversion of Laidley Plains into a cattle station. In 1852 the lease was transferred to Henry Mort and his brother-in-law James Laidley, with Henry managing the Franklyn Vale section of the run, and James managing the remainder as Laidley Plains. This partnership was dissolved in late 1869, by which time government resumptions had reduced Franklyn Vale to about 4,000 hectares (9,900 acres) freehold.

Henry Mort removed his family to Sydney in 1855, where he joined his brother in Mort & Co. (later Goldsbrough, Mort & Co. Ltd), and thereafter resided only intermittently at Franklyn Vale, which was run by managers. However, he maintained a strong interest in Queensland, representing West Moreton in the NSW Legislative Assembly prior to the separation of Queensland.

From 1871 to 1876 Edward Kendall Crace, Henry's son-in-law, resided at Franklyn Vale as managing partner. The Mort family understands the present homestead was erected for Mrs Crace.

48,000 acres (19,000 ha) were resumed from the Franklyn Vale property and offered for selection on 17 April 1877.

By 1891 Franklyn Vale was owned jointly by Henry Mort and his sons Charles Franklyn and Arthur Edward Lisle. Charles had been associated with Franklyn Vale as bookkeeper/overseer from about 1872. In the 1890s he developed the district's dairy industry, establishing a creamery and butter factory at Grandchester c.1893. Arthur took over the management of Franklyn Vale, which ultimately became his home, in 1891. In the 1890s he acquired his brother's interest in the property, and after his father's death in 1900, became sole owner. He developed Herefords and dairy cattle at Franklyn Vale, but mainly used the run as a fattening depot for his two other Queensland cattle properties: Redbank in the Burnett and Avoca in the Brisbane Valley.

In late 1900, established Brisbane architects Addison & Corrie were commissioned to design a school room and guest wing for the homestead, and to undertake minor alterations. It is likely the shingled roof was covered with the present galvanised iron and that the kitchen was enlarged at this time. Mr & Mrs Arthur Mort also improved the garden and are believed to have engaged architect Robin Smith Dods to design the summerhouse. The homestead remains the property of their descendants.

== Description ==
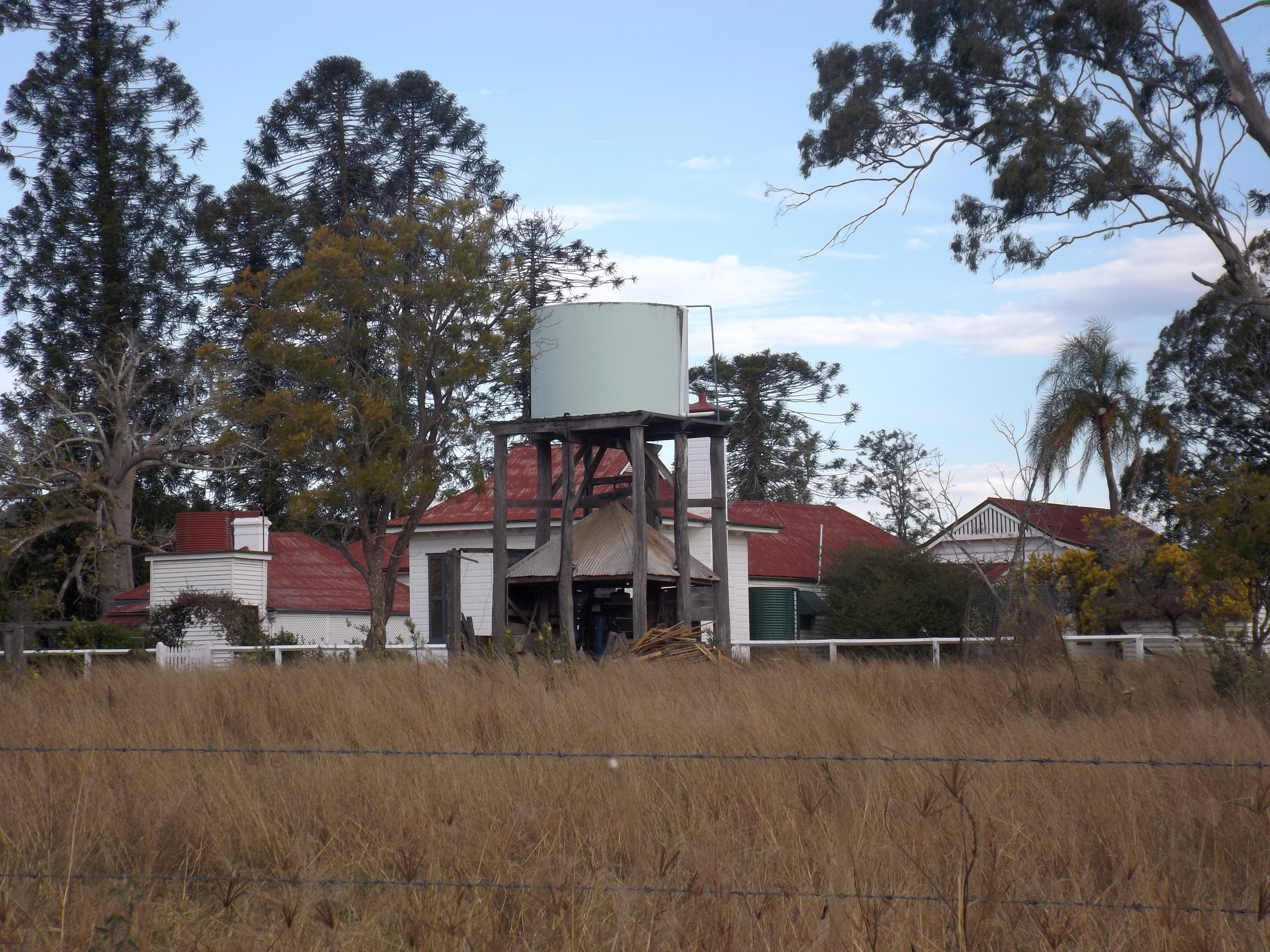
Western approach, 2015

Franklyn Vale Homestead is a single-storeyed weatherboard building with a projecting kitchen wing and a servants wing forming a northern courtyard. It sits on the crest of a low hill and has substantial early formal gardens, mature trees, including two lines of bunya trees at the eastern and western perimeters. There is a tennis court to the south.

The main section of the building has twin corrugated iron hipped roofs with a central box gutter and is surrounded by verandahs with skillion roofs. The two wings have corrugated iron broken hipped roofs with verandahs to the courtyard. A chamferboard schoolroom with a corrugated iron gambrel roof is attached to the north end of the servants wing and a chamferboard bedroom wing with a corrugated iron gable roof is attached to the southeast corner of the main house. The building sits on timber stumps and has a windmill pump in the centre of the courtyard and an arched entrance gate.

The perimeter verandahs have timber lattice balustrade and boarded ceilings. Timber shingles are visible below the corrugated iron roofs of the courtyard verandahs and lattice panels screen the kitchen verandah. French doors with fanlights and screens open to the verandahs, with the bedroom wing having panelled timber doors. The bedroom wing and schoolroom have tall sash windows with timber framed gauze shutters and the schoolroom has a boarded chimney

Internally, walls are painted horizontal timber boards with stained timber fanlights, doors, architraves, skirting and picture rails. A bay with French doors opens off the lounge and fireplaces have timber surrounds. Ceilings are boarded, with some roses, and floors are carpeted.

The kitchen has exposed roof framing with timber shingles visible below corrugated iron, a central brick double fireplace and walls are single-skin. The servants wing is also single-skin, has window hoods to the west and has a large shower head, originally operated by a cord to release tank water. The schoolhouse has a high boarded ceiling with pitched corners and a fretwork rose. The large fireplace has a timber surround and houses a stove.

A weatherboard meathouse with a corrugated iron pyramid roof and ventilator is located to northwest. It has a separate, internal, timber frame and gauze structure with meat hooks and a concrete floor. A stained timber post-and-beam summerhouse with a corrugated iron pyramid roof and ventilator is located to the southwest near the tennis court. It has a boarded ceiling above the rafters, and single- skin vertically jointed infill boards, with fixed glazing above to the rear, and a solid balustrade with timber gates to the front.

A slab timber shed with a shingle gabled roof is located to the north, with a lean-to the north and east. The shed consists of timber posts with horizontal slab infill fixed into central grooves. A tankstand is located at the western end with a small structure below.

The grounds include a small weatherboard cottage to the northwest, sitting on timber stumps with a corrugated iron gabled roof and a front verandah. There is also a timber garden shed with a corrugated iron gabled roof and solid timber balustrade.

The furniture contained within the homestead is excluded from the cultural heritage significance of the homestead.

== Heritage listing ==
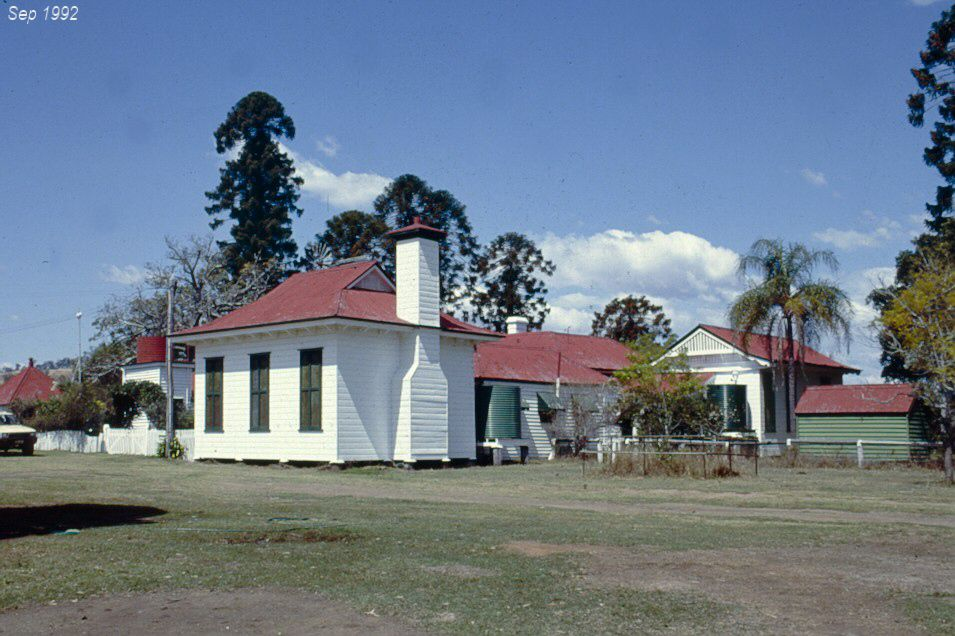
Franklyn Vale Homestead, 1992

Franklyn Vale Homestead was listed on the Queensland Heritage Register on 21 October 1992 having satisfied the following criteria.

The place is important in demonstrating the evolution or pattern of Queensland's history.

Franklyn Vale Homestead and associated outbuildings and grounds is important in demonstrating the evolution and pattern of European settlement in the West Moreton district since the 1870s.

The place demonstrates rare, uncommon or endangered aspects of Queensland's cultural heritage.

The c. 1870s slab shed demonstrates a now rare aspect of Queensland's cultural heritage, namely the principal characteristics of 19th century bush technology and building practices, which are no longer common.

The place is important in demonstrating the principal characteristics of a particular class of cultural places.

The 1870s homestead and slab building, the 1900s additions, the summerhouse and the formal garden, form a cohesive group which together demonstrate in their intactness and in their arrangement of elements, the principal characteristics of a south east Queensland homestead complex of the late 19th and 20th centuries.

The place is important because of its aesthetic significance.

The relationship of the buildings in scale, form and materials, their siting in the landscape and relationships with the surrounding established gardens, exhibit an aesthetic quality valued by the local community and those interested in Queensland homesteads and their gardens.

The place has a special association with the life or work of a particular person, group or organisation of importance in Queensland's history.

Franklyn Vale Homestead has a special association with the Mort family and their contribution to the development of the Queensland pastoral industry since 1849.
