= Mutdapilly, Queensland =

Mutdapilly
- Suburb
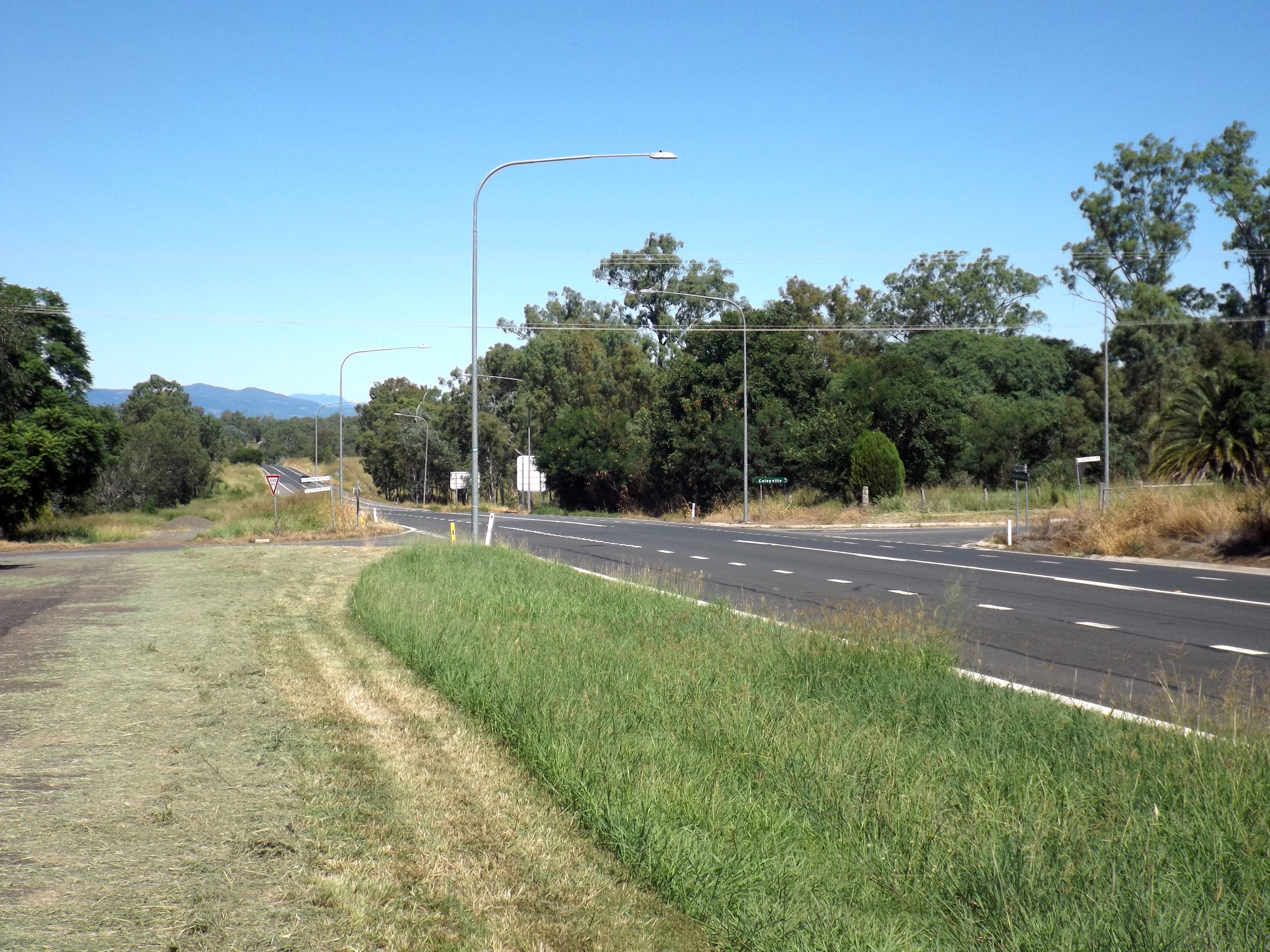
- Cunningham Highway, 2015

- Interactive map of Mutdapilly
- Coordinates: 27.7652°S 152.6422°E
- Country: Australia
- State: Queensland
- LGAs: Scenic Rim Region; City of Ipswich
- Location: 22.9 km (14.2 mi) SW of Ipswich; 37.3 km (23.2 mi) NW of Boonah; 61.1 km (38.0 mi) SW of Brisbane CBD; 62.4 km (38.8 mi) NW of Beaudesert
- Established: 1827

Government
  - State electorate: Scenic Rim
  - Federal divisions: Wright; Blair

Area
  - Total: 43.8 km^{2} (16.9 sq mi)

Population
  - Total: 308 (2021 census)
  - Density: 7.032/km^{2} (18.21/sq mi)
- Time zone: UTC+10:00 (AEST)
- Postcode: 4307
Suburbs around Mutdapilly
Mount Forbes	Willowbank	Purga
Mount Forbes	Mutdapilly	Peak Crossing
Coleyville	Harrisville	Peak Crossing

Mutdapilly is a rural locality in south-east Queensland, Australia. It is split between the local government areas of Scenic Rim Region and City of Ipswich. In the 2021 census, Mutdapilly had a population of 308 people.

== Geography ==
Mutdapilly is centrally divided by the north/south running Cunningham Highway. The eastern boundary follows Warrill Creek.

There is one of fifteen air quality monitoring stations in the region located at Mutdapilly.

== History ==
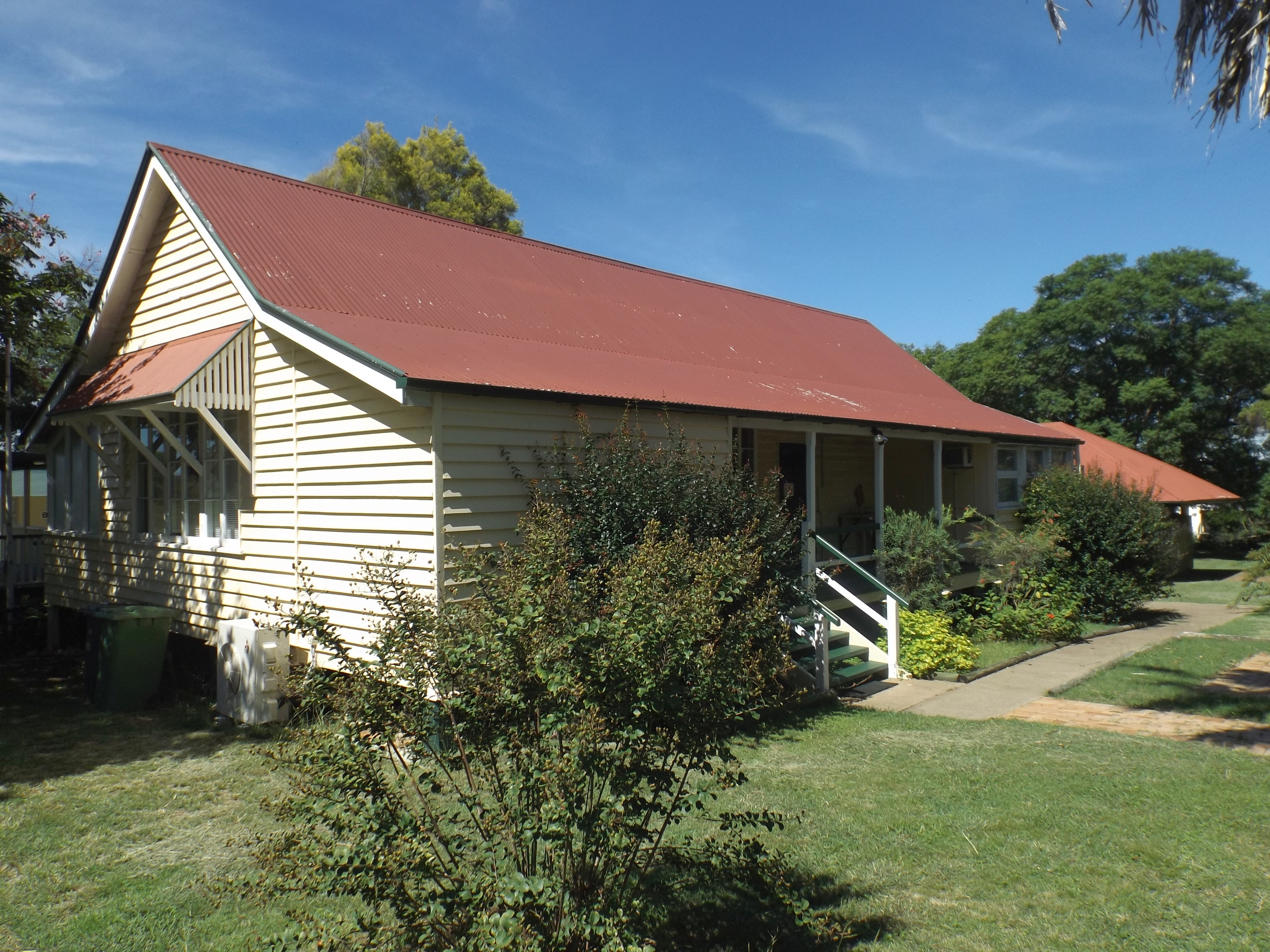
Mutdapilly State School building, 2015

The name Mutdapilly is believed to be a combination word from the Yuggera language (Yugarabul dialect) where mudtherri means sticky or muddy and pilly means gully. The name was given by Captain Patrick Logan on 9 June 1827.

Local farmer, Mr Denman, donated 2 acres of land to build a school. The Normanby State School and teacher's residence was opened on 27 April 1874; the first head teacher was John Stanfell Clowes who served at the school until 31 July 1876. The school was renamed Mutdapilly State School on 1 April 1968.

St Aidan's Church of England was built in Mutdapilly in 1921. It was a timber church building, designed by Charles Chauvel (the Australian filmmaker). It was dedicated on Easter Monday 15 April 1922 by Coadjutor Bishop Henry Le Fanu. The church closed in 1974 and the building is now used as a residence. It is at 3994 Cunningham Highway (27.769692°S 152.6504°E).

== Demographics ==
In the 2016 census, Mutdapilly had a population of 308 people.

In the 2021 census, Mutdapilly had a population of 308 people.

== Education ==
Mutdapilly State School is a government primary (Prep-6) school for boys and girls at 4 Mutdapilly-Churchbank Weir Road (27.7710°S 152.6506°E). In 2018, the school had an enrolment of 29 students with 6 teachers (3 full-time equivalent) and 5 non-teaching staff (3 full-time equivalent). In 2023, the school had an enrolment of 38 students.

There are no secondary schools in Mutdapilly. The nearest government secondary schools are Rosewood State High School in Rosewood to the north-west and Bremer State High School in Ipswich to the north-east.

== Heritage listings ==
Heritage listings for Mutdapilly include:

- Mutdapilly State School, 4 Mutdapilly-Churchbank Weir Road

== Notable residents ==
- Charles Chauvel, early Australian filmmaker
