= Ashwell =

Ashwell may refer to:

== Places ==
- Ashwell, Devon
- Ashwell, Hertfordshire
- Ashwell, Rutland
- Ashwell, Somerset
- Ashwell, Queensland, a suburb of Ipswich, in Australia
- Kana Cone, a volcanic cone in British Columbia, Canada

== People ==
- Gilbert Ashwell (1916–2014)
- Lena Ashwell (1872–1957)
- Richard Ashwell (died 1392)
- Thomas Ashwell (1470s–16th-century)
- Arthur Rawson Ashwell (1824–1879)
- John Ashwell (died 1541)
- Johnny Ashwell (born 1954)
- Pauline Ashwell (1926–2015)
- Rachel Ashwell (born 1959)
- Ashwell Prince (born 1977)

== Buildings ==
- Ashwell (HM Prison)
