= Calvert, Queensland =

Calvert
- Town
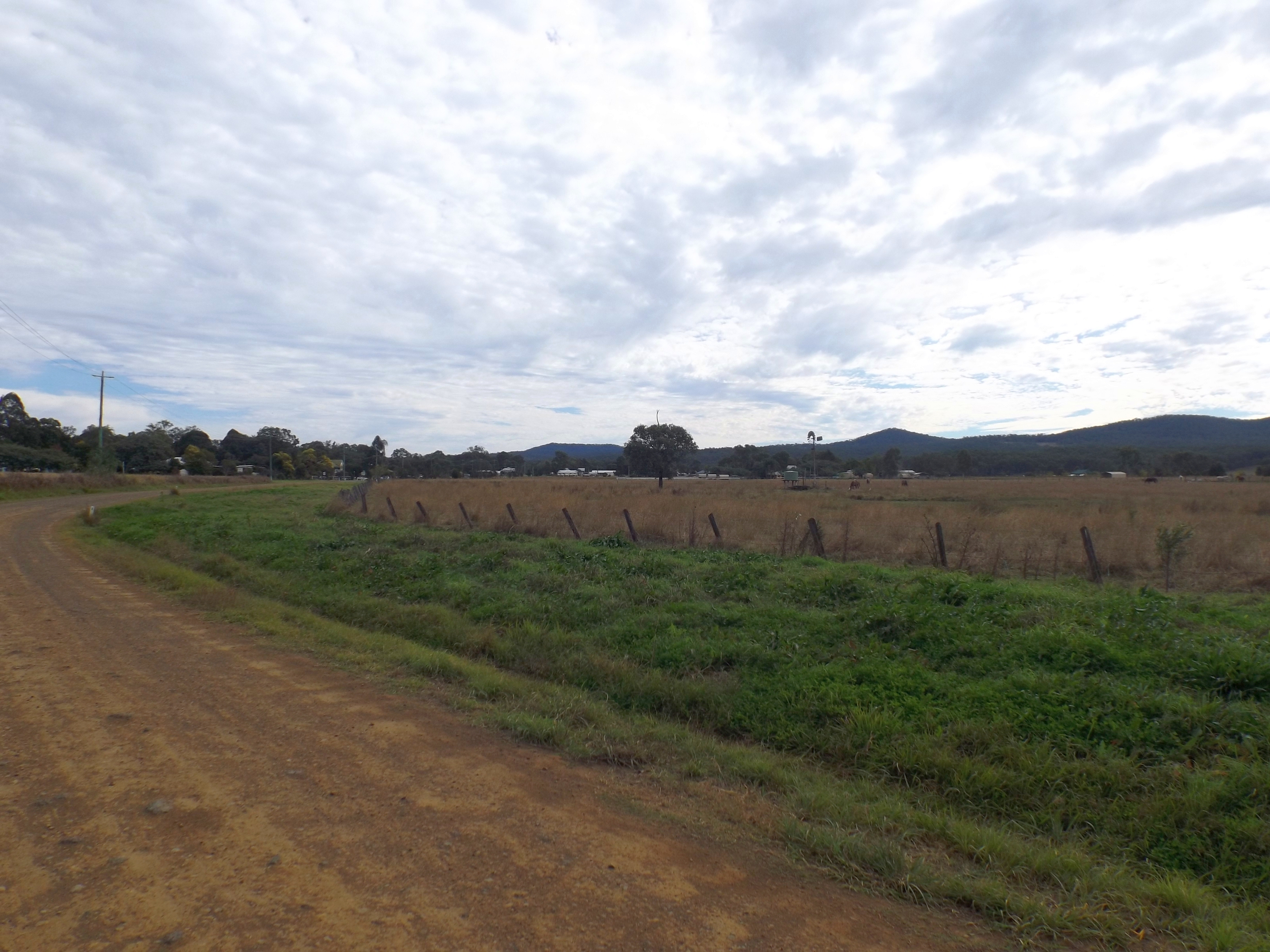
- Houses and paddocks along Waters Road, 2015

- Interactive map of Calvert
- Coordinates: 27.665°S 152.5186°E
- Country: Australia
- State: Queensland
- City: Ipswich
- LGA: City of Ipswich
- Location: 8.5 km (5.3 mi) WSW of Rosewood; 16.7 km (10.4 mi) ESE of Laidley; 29.2 km (18.1 mi) W of Ipswich; 70.4 km (43.7 mi) WSW of Brisbane

Government
  - State electorates: Ipswich West; Scenic Rim
  - Federal division: Blair

Area
  - Total: 44.2 km^{2} (17.1 sq mi)

Population
  - Total: 374 (2021 census)
  - Density: 8.462/km^{2} (21.92/sq mi)
- Time zone: UTC+10:00 (AEST)
- Postcode: 4340
Localities around Calvert
Grandchester	Woolshed	The Bluff
Grandchester	Calvert	Lanefield
Grandchester	Lower Mount Walker	Lower Mount Walker

Calvert is a rural town and locality in the City of Ipswich, Queensland, Australia. In the 2021 census, the locality of Calvert had a population of 374 people.

== Geography ==
The Main Line railway passes through Calvert as does Western Creek, a tributary of the Bremer River. A 2014 flood mapping study of the Western Creek catchment has provided more reliable flood information to residents and landowners. In the northern extents elevations rise to 340 metres above sea level around Mount Grandchester No. 2. which is part of the Little Liverpool Range. The landscape in the southern parts of Calvert is mostly used for agriculture.

== History ==
The district originally contained an inn opened in 1843 by Owens, later sold to McKeon, and was surveyed in 1854 as the village of Alfred, becoming a stopping place on the coach route the same year. On 9 March 1931, the district was renamed to Calvert.

Calvert was not one of the original stations on the Main Line railway passing through the district, however in 1865 residents petitioned for a station. In 1866 Western Creek station opened, renamed Calvert in 1884.

Alfred State School opened on 11 March 1872. In 1910 it was renamed Calvert State School. It closed in 1972. It was at 29-35 Newcastle Street (27.6647°S 152.5212°E).

== Demographics ==
In the 2011 census, the locality of Calvert had a population of 281 people.

In the 2016 census, the locality of Calvert had a population of 313 people.

In the 2021 census, the locality of Calvert had a population of 374 people.

== Education ==
There are no schools in Cavert. The nearest government primary schools are Grandchester State School in neighbouring Grandchester to the west and Ashwell State School in Ashwell to the north-east. The nearest government secondary schools are Rosewood State High School in Rosewood to the east and Laidley State High School in Laidley to the west.

== Sport ==
A paintball centre was established at Cummings Road in 2014. It hosts scenario paintball events and a tournament Speedball paintball series. The centre changed names from Tac Ops Paintball to Valhalla Paintball in 2021.

Preceding station	Queensland Rail	Following station
Former service
Lanefield towards Brisbane	Main Line railway	Grandchester towards Toowoomba
