= The Bluff, Queensland (Ipswich) =

The Bluff
- Suburb
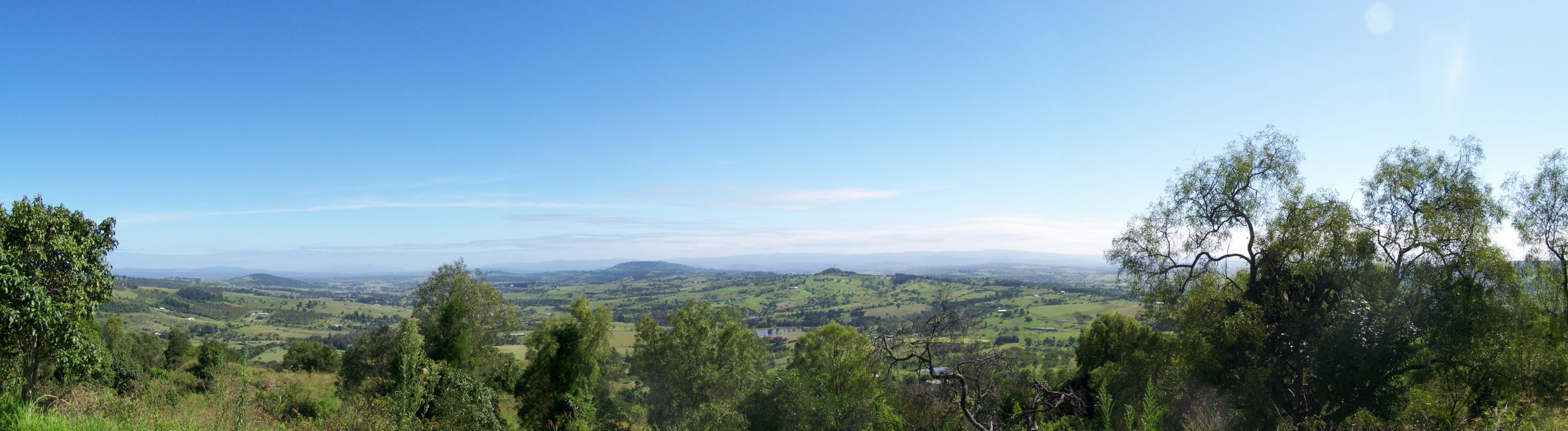
- View from The Bluff, looking north

- Interactive map of The Bluff
- Coordinates: 27.615°S 152.5341°E
- Country: Australia
- State: Queensland
- City: Ipswich
- LGA: City of Ipswich
- Location: 7.7 km (4.8 mi) WNW of Rosewood; 28.2 km (17.5 mi) W of Ipswich CBD; 69.7 km (43.3 mi) WSW of Brisbane CBD

Government
  - State electorate: Ipswich West
  - Federal division: Blair

Area
  - Total: 8.3 km^{2} (3.2 sq mi)

Population
  - Total: 53 (2021 census)
  - Density: 6.39/km^{2} (16.54/sq mi)
- Time zone: UTC+10:00 (AEST)
- Postcode: 4340
Suburbs around The Bluff
Woolshed	Tallegalla	Tallegalla
Woolshed	The Bluff	Ashwell
Calvert	Lanefield	Ashwell

The Bluff is a rural locality in the City of Ipswich, Queensland, Australia. In the 2021 census, The Bluff had a population of 53 people.

== Demographics ==
In the 2016 census, The Bluff had a population of 35 people.

In the 2021 census, The Bluff had a population of 53 people.

== Education ==
There are no schools in The Bluff. The nearest government primary schools are Ashwell State School in neighbouring Ashwell to the south-west and Minden State School in Minden to the north. The nearest government secondary school is Rosewood State High School in Rosewood to the south-east.
