= Marburg State School =

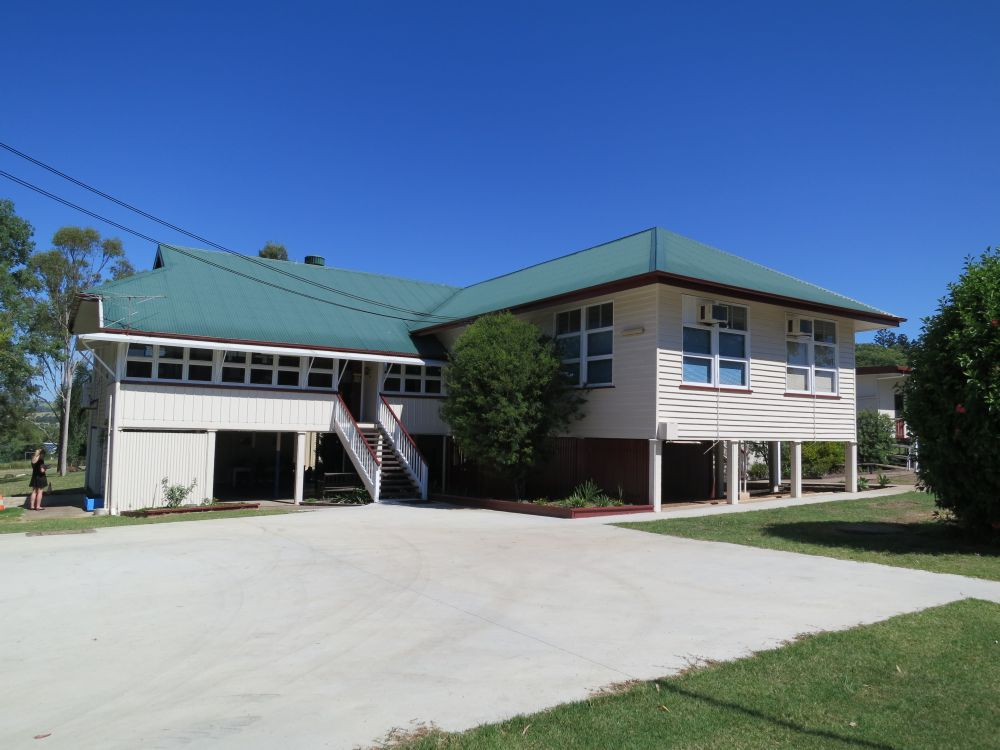
- Sectional School Building (Block A), from north, 2015

- Location within Queensland
- 27.5615°S 152.5932°E
- Location: Louisa Street, Marburg, City of Ipswich, Queensland, Australia

History
- Design period: 1919–1930s (Interwar period)
- Built: 1922, 1925, 1926, 1928

Site notes
- Architect: Queensland Department of Public Works

Queensland Heritage Register
- Official name: Marburg State School; Marburg Rural School
- Type: state heritage
- Designated: 9 October 2015
- Reference no.: 650002
- Type: Education, research, scientific facility: School-state; Education, research, scientific facility: Teacher's residence; Parks/gardens/trees: Garden-experimental/research; Parks/gardens/trees: Tree groups
- Theme: Exploiting, utilising and transforming the land: Managing flora and fauna; Educating Queenslanders: Providing primary schooling

Marburg State School is a heritage-listed state school at Louisa Street, Marburg, City of Ipswich, Queensland, Australia. It was designed by Queensland Department of Public Works and built in 1922. It is also known as Marburg Rural School. It was added to the Queensland Heritage Register on 9 October 2015.

== History ==
Marburg State School opened in 1879 as Frederick State School (renamed Marburg State School in 1888) on a small site within the small agricultural settlement of Frederick, to serve its growing rural population. In February 1920, Marburg Rural School commenced in rented buildings until the rural school and primary school moved to the current school site in June 1922. The school has been in continuous operation since establishment and has been a focus for the local community as a place for important social and cultural activity.

European occupation of the Rosewood Scrub and nearby Sally Owens Plains for pastoral purposes dates from the early 1840s. Frederick's (Marburg's) establishment, as an agricultural settlement, dates from the 1860s when the area was settled, primarily by German immigrants.

The original state school opened on a small sloping site in Edmond Street on 18 March 1879. The school, comprising a classroom and residence, was constructed by J Byers and had an average daily attendance during the first year was 31.8 pupils.

The provision of state-administered education was important to the colonial governments of Australia. Following the introduction of Queensland's Education Act 1860, which established the Board of General Education and began standardising curriculum, training and facilities, Queensland's public schools grew from four in 1860 to 230 by 1875. The Queensland Education Act 1875 provided for free, compulsory and secular primary education and the establishment of the Department of Public Instruction. This further standardised the provision of education, and despite difficulties, achieved the remarkable feat of bringing basic literacy to most Queensland children by 1900.

The establishment of schools was considered an essential step in the development of early communities and integral to their success. Locals often donated land and labour for a school's construction and the school community contributed to maintenance and development. Schools became a community focus, a symbol of progress, and a source of pride, with enduring connections formed with past pupils, parents and teachers. The inclusion of war memorials and community halls reinforced these connections and provided a venue for a wide range of community events in schools across Queensland.

To help ensure consistency and economy, the Queensland Government developed standard plans for its school buildings. From the 1860s until the 1960s, Queensland school buildings were predominantly timber-framed, an easy and cost-effective approach that also enabled the government to provide facilities in remote areas. Standard designs were continually refined in response to changing needs and educational philosophy and Queensland school buildings were particularly innovative in climate control, lighting, and ventilation. Standardisation produced distinctly similar schools across Queensland with complexes of typical components.

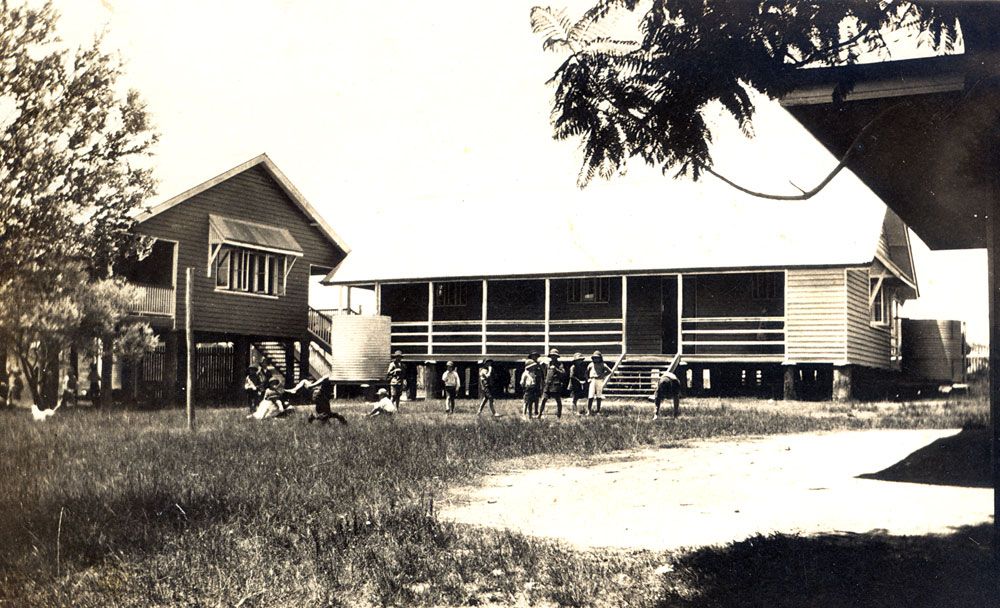
Marburg State School, at the original location, 1910

During the 1880s Marburg grew as a commercial centre for the surrounding agricultural area and as an administrative centre for Walloon Division (1879–1903). In 1888 the school was renamed Marburg State School to reflect the town's change of name, and it continued to grow - with additions in 1888, reroofing in 1904, and repairs and improvements in 1908.

Growth of the town continued in the new century. Marburg gained rail connection to Ipswich and Brisbane when the Marburg branch railway was extended from Rosewood on the Main Line railway in 1911, but the siting of the Marburg railway station reduced the grounds of the school. Additional land on the western side of the school reserve was added but was steep and unsuitable for a playground.

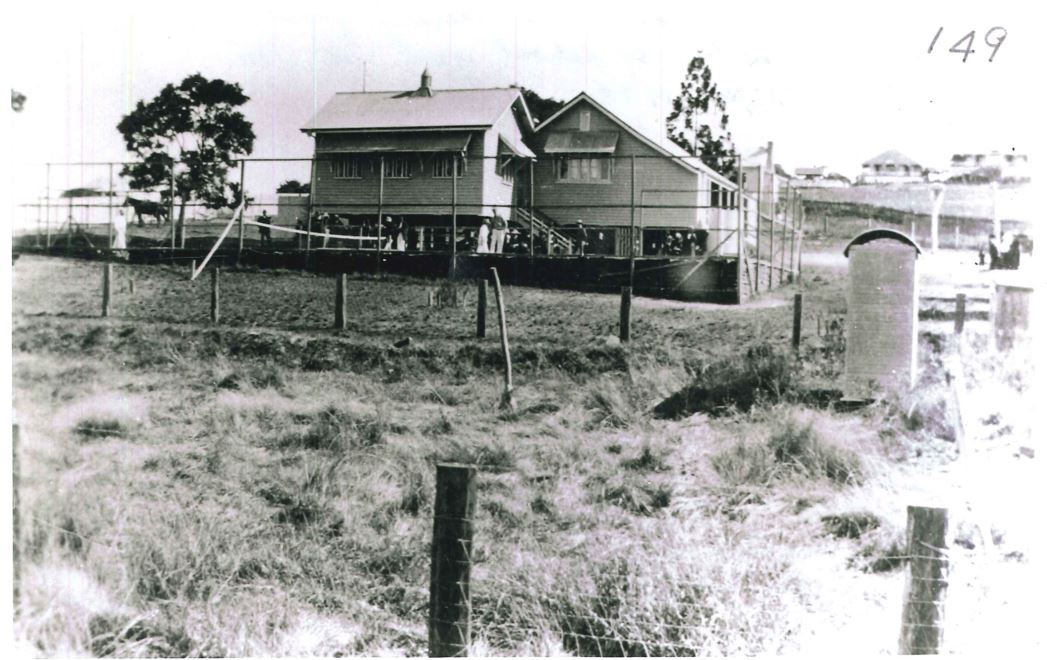
Marburg State School, ca. 1920.

The idea of rural schools, to educate country children in practical subjects, arose in the early 20th century following the establishment in 1897 of the Queensland Agricultural College at Lawes near Gatton to train young men in agriculture and related sciences. The college, administered by the Department of Agriculture and Stock, was part of a wider scheme of introducing "scientific agriculture" to the colony, which included experimental farms and travelling model dairies. Within the school system, a limited form of rural instruction was introduced in syllabus changes made in 1905 and 1915.

John Douglas Story, Under-Secretary of Public Instruction from 1905, believed like many others, that Queensland's future depended on agricultural development. Between 1914 and 1916 he finalised a plan for three tiers of agricultural education - rural schools, state high schools, and University Agricultural Department. In 1910, to provide expert guidance from within the Department of Public Instruction, Story appointed James Clement Stubbin as Queensland's Teacher of Agriculture. Stubbin promoted the notion of a scientific approach to agriculture by writing a textbook on the school garden, agricultural bulletins, and constantly touring schools to give lessons on topics such as milk and cream testing, planting and pruning. In 1917 Queensland's first rural school was established as an adjunct to the Nambour State School.

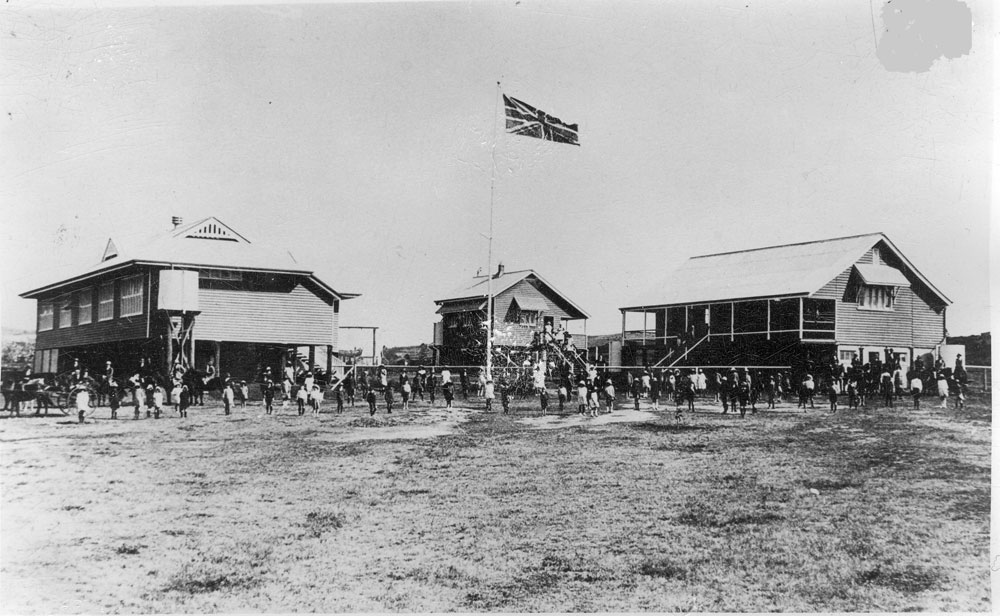
Marburg State Rural School, 1926

With the success of the Nambour Rural School, the Department of Public Instruction decided to open three more rural schools in 1920, one of which was at Marburg. Consequently, a 10-acre (approximately 4 hectares (9.9 acres)) lot in Louisa Street, about 0.5 miles (0.80 km) to the northwest of the first school site but close to the Marburg town centre with its railway station, was purchased from A Beutel for £250 on 30 August 1920 as the future site of the Marburg Rural School. This proximity to the railway station was important because "pupils aged between 12 and 14 years and ex-pupils to 17 years were eligible for free rail travel and free tuition at a Rural School one day per week". Pupils from Rosewood, Minden, Tallegalla, Lark Hill. Glamorgan Vale, Haigslea and Walloon were allotted a day for attendance at Marburg Rural School.

Rural school classes were held in rented buildings in the Marburg Show grounds until 1922, when the former school buildings were transported to the new site and repurposed as vocational classrooms.

The purpose of rural schools was to educate children to enable them to develop rural areas and to provide a means of extending country children's education beyond the compulsory years with an additional year of agricultural and domestic studies. Altogether 30 rural schools opened in Queensland between 1917 and 1939. Each was located in prime fruit-growing, dairying or agricultural areas and functioned "as a central school for the surrounding district schools, teaching domestic, commercial, agricultural and vocational classes".

The new sectional school building at Marburg State School was built to a Department of Public Works (DPW) standard design (D/T1), with some modifications, for £2990 and was ready for use on 29 January 1922. A 1921 plan of the sectional school building shows it as a long, weatherboard-clad structure, highset on tall stumps, with a Dutch-gable roof and two circular roof vents. A teachers annexe was attached to the verandah on the northern side, and included one space for the head teacher and another for the assistant teachers. Stairs either side of the teachers' annexe provided access to the verandah, which was enclosed at the western end for hat and coat racks, and at the eastern end for use as a store room. Large banks of windows spanned the southern wall. The interior was divided into five 21-foot-6-inch (6.55 m) wide classrooms of varying lengths, and a science room was located at the eastern end. Three western classrooms were connected via folding glass doors and each classroom featured a ceiling vent.

Two vocational training buildings were constructed from the former school building, which was cut in half and moved to the site. Reconstruction and fitting out of the vocational building was supervised by a Mr Ash, for £215/10s, and was completed by 5 March 1923. This included enclosing under the buildings with sheet metal. Its total cost was £718.

The layout of the school grounds was designed by William Ernest Bick, curator of the Brisbane Botanic Gardens. His 1922 report stated that:

"I found it difficult to make a good approach from street to school buildings owing to [the] sports ground. The roadway is 16ft (4.88 m) on plan and swings around flagpole. The trees on drive and on boundarys [sic] are 33ft (10.06 m) apart."

"In the Forestry plots I have provided for about 144 [trees] and proposed to plant 1 of each 6 kinds of soft and 6 kinds of hardwoods. The fruit trees are put down at 25 ft (7.71 m) apart this will give plenty of room for cultivation, it will depend of course on what kind of tree you wish to go in for, and the distance apart can be arranged to suit small growing trees. The space for garden plots I have left for your own design."

A meeting of the school committee in 1925 decided the horse paddock in the northwestern corner of the site would be fenced off. The work was to be completed through working bees and the government would supply the wire. During the same meeting, arrangements were made to plant shade trees on the northern side of the school grounds and it was noted that the Department of Public Instruction advised of its intention to construct a new teacher's residence.

Most Queensland state schools incorporated a teacher's residence on the site, particularly in rural areas. In Australia, only Queensland offered free accommodation to teachers, the government policy applying to male teachers (only) from as early as 1864. This was partial recompense for a low wage, an incentive for teacher recruitment in rural areas and provided onsite caretakers. Refinement of the standard residence design occurred over time, with each modification responding to teacher complaints and Teachers' Union agitation. Following World War I, teacher shortages were blamed on the inadequacy and shortage of teachers' residences. Consequently, many new teacher residences were constructed across Queensland in the 1930s and again following World War II.

Residences designed by the DPW's architects, and constructed to the high standard demanded by the state, were typically of a higher-quality in design, materials and construction than most similarly-scaled private residences. The detached teacher's residence was located within the school grounds at a distance from the teaching buildings, usually with a separate, fenced yard with gardens and trees. The designs ranged from one to four bedrooms and evolved simultaneously with the teaching buildings to keep up with modern needs and styles.

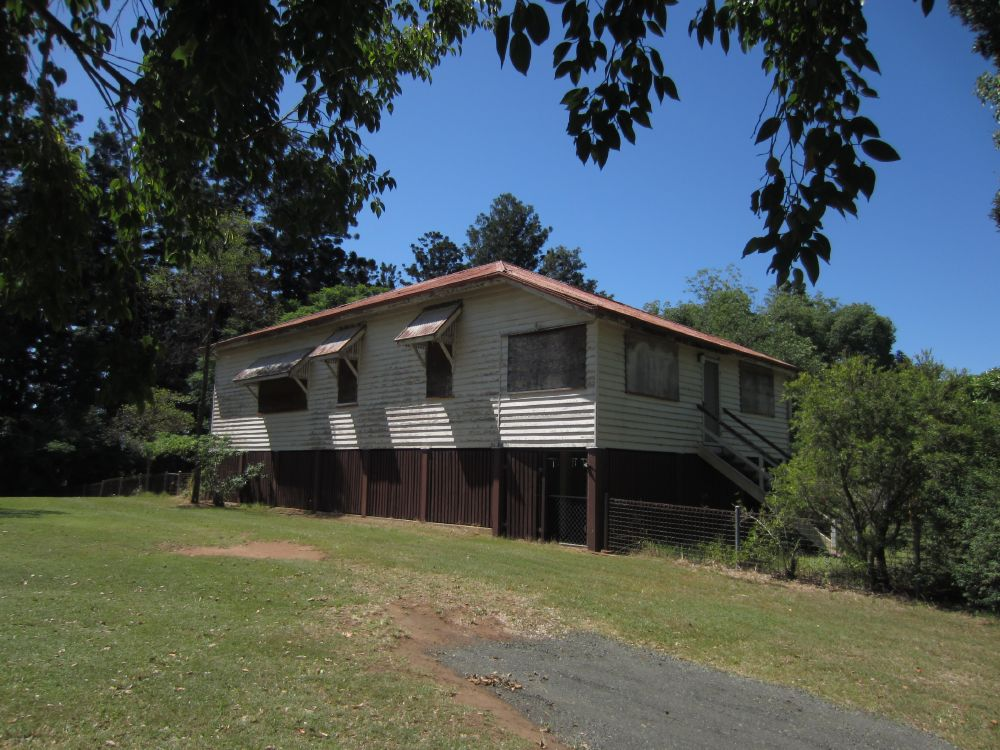
Teacher's residence from the south-west, 2015

A new teacher's residence was built at Marburg Rural School in 1926 for £1145. It was located on the eastern side of the site and faced south toward the entry driveway. The 1926 plan shows the residence as a highset structure, with an 8 feet (2.4 m)front verandah and a 10 feet (3.0 m) rear verandah - the rear verandah was enclosed with weatherboard cladding and casement windows. Southern and eastern stairs accessed the front and rear verandahs, respectively. The interior comprised a core of three bedrooms and a dining room arranged around a central hallway; and a rear wing included a kitchen with stove alcove, pantry, bathroom, and servant's room. The understorey housed a wash house (below the kitchen). In the same year, a fence was constructed around the residence and the understorey was enclosed with battens.

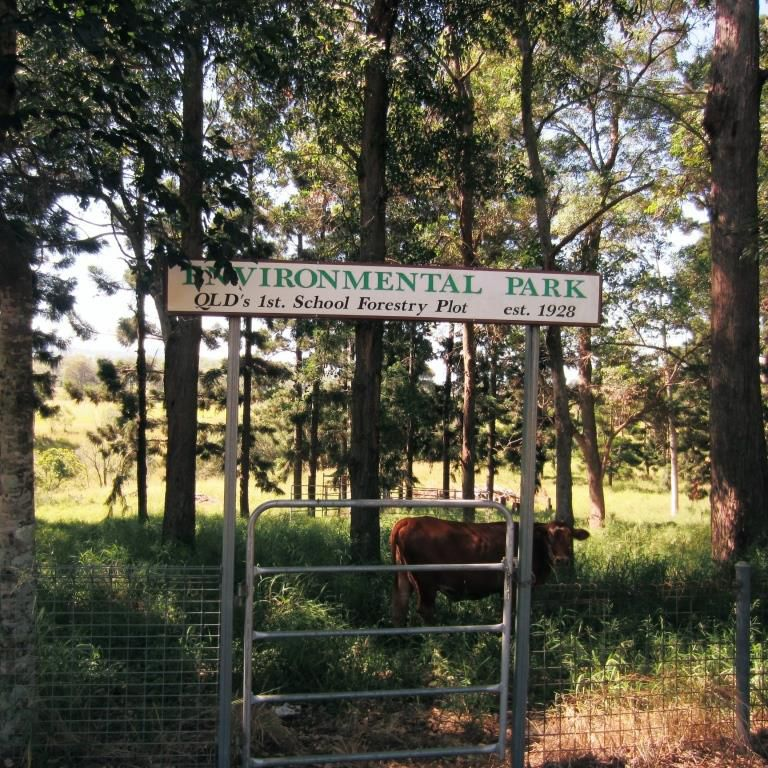
Entrance to the forestry plot, from south, 2015

The school retains a forestry plot in the north-east corner of the site, which was the first established in Queensland in 1928. Forestry plots were the product of after-school agricultural clubs, introduced in 1923 at primary schools, under the "home project" scheme. Curriculum driven, these clubs had a secondary commercial value as well as disseminating information and helping to develop a range of skills. The Department of Primary Industry provided suitable plants and offered horticultural advice. School forestry plots were seen by the government as a way of educating the next generation about the economic and environmental importance of trees, as well as providing testing grounds for new species. Located throughout the state, the plots were a means of experimenting with a variety of tree species in different soil and climatic conditions. The sale of timber grown in school plots provided an additional source of income for the school, and the plots themselves were an attractive feature of school grounds. At Marburg State Rural School 275 exotic and indigenous trees were planted initially. Encouraged by the Education and Forestry Departments, by 1953 about 380 Queensland schools were undertaking forestry projects. An account in the school's 125th Anniversary Book recalls that the trees were ordered from the Department of Forestry, planted in rows, and spaced two metres apart. Trees planted include: bunya pine (Araucaria bidwillii), kauri pine (Agathis robusta), crow's ash (Flindersia australis), Mexican cedar (Taxodium mexicanum), Pinus longifolia, Pinus radiata, Pinus insularis and silky oak (Grevillea robusta). Ongoing planting occurred. The trees remaining include hoop pine (Araucaria cunninghamii), kauri pine, silky oak and Norfolk Island pine (Araucaria heterophylla).

In addition to the usual school subjects, farm-craft, leatherwork, blacksmithing and domestic science were taught. Other activities at the Marburg Rural School were a calf club; a forestry nursery germinating seeds of selected hardwoods and softwoods, and planting the seedling tubes around Marburg; an orchard of citrus and nut trees; pasture renovations using grasses, legumes and fertilizers; potato growing; milk and cream testing; pig raising on the school farm; room competitions; and meal preparation.

As well as the forestry plot, other landscaping and tree planting took place in the school grounds. An orchard was created on the site of the current pre-school; an ant-bed surfaced tennis court was added by the school community in 1927, to the west of the teacher's residence, after levelling of the site; and paths and gardens were laid out between the school buildings by the early 1930s. Eighteen fig trees (17 small leafed and one with large leaves) lining the driveway from the entrance gate to the school buildings were planted in the 1930s.

The rural school scheme was phased out between the 1940s and 1960s due to a move to larger farms by the late 1940s and the consequent decline in government emphasis on closer settlement; as well as the transfer of domestic, vocational and commercial subjects to the curriculum of the growing number of state high schools. Marburg Rural School reverted to a state school in 1963 after the cessation of vocational and domestic science training at the school. In 1959 the vocational building burnt down and classes were transferred to Ipswich. Domestic science classes ceased in 1963 and the building was sold for removal. This change coincided with a decline in Marburg's population towards its lowest level in the late 1960s.

Additions and alterations to the school continued in the post-World War II period. In 1959 improvements to the lighting of the sectional school building were made for £855. Also at this time, the eastern store room was removed from the verandah of the sectional school building. Hat and bag racks were added, and louvres were inserted into the building's verandah walls. A 1969 plan indicates the extension of the teachers annexe by 16 feet (4.9 m) to the north to accommodate a staff-room and services-room. At this time, the building's internal partitions were also altered to accommodate four larger classrooms; and the southeastern and northwestern walls were replaced to include new openings.

Minor alterations have been made to the teacher's residence since its construction. The front verandah has been enclosed with weatherboard cladding and most external windows have been replaced with aluminium frames (the openings remain in their original locations). A 1966 plan shows the addition of a weatherboard-clad toilet extension on the eastern side of the rear verandah, and to accommodate this, the repositioning of the eastern set of stairs.

In 1966 a new toilet block north of the sectional school building was installed. A modular pre-school building was added in 1978 southeast of the sectional school building, on the former orchard site, and replaced in 1990–1 by a new building southeast of the residence. The modular pre-school building, adjacent the sectional school building, was removed from the site between November 2014 and March 2015. The tennis court was relocated to the southwestern corner of the site between 2005 and 2009; and in 2015 the location of the original tennis court is used as a car-park. In 2009 Marburg State School was granted $250,000 for the construction of a multi-purpose hall as part of the Building the Education Revolution project (Primary Schools for the 21st Century (P21) component). This multi-purpose hall was constructed by January 2012 and is located southeast of the sectional school building. The flagpole on site in the 1920s is not extant in 2015.

Celebrations of the school's 75th Jubilee were held in 1954, its centenary in 1979 and its 125th anniversary in 2004. The latter two events included publication of the school's history. The school's bell, which had been stolen, was replaced in 1979 and is located northwest of the sectional school building in 2015.

In 2015, the school continues to operate from its 1922 site. It retains its sectional school building, teacher's residence, forestry plot and horse paddock, as well as its landscaped grounds. The school is important to Marburg, having been a focus for the community and generations of Marburg and district students have been taught there. Since establishment it has been a key social focus for the Marburg community with the grounds and building serving as the venue for many social events.

== Description ==
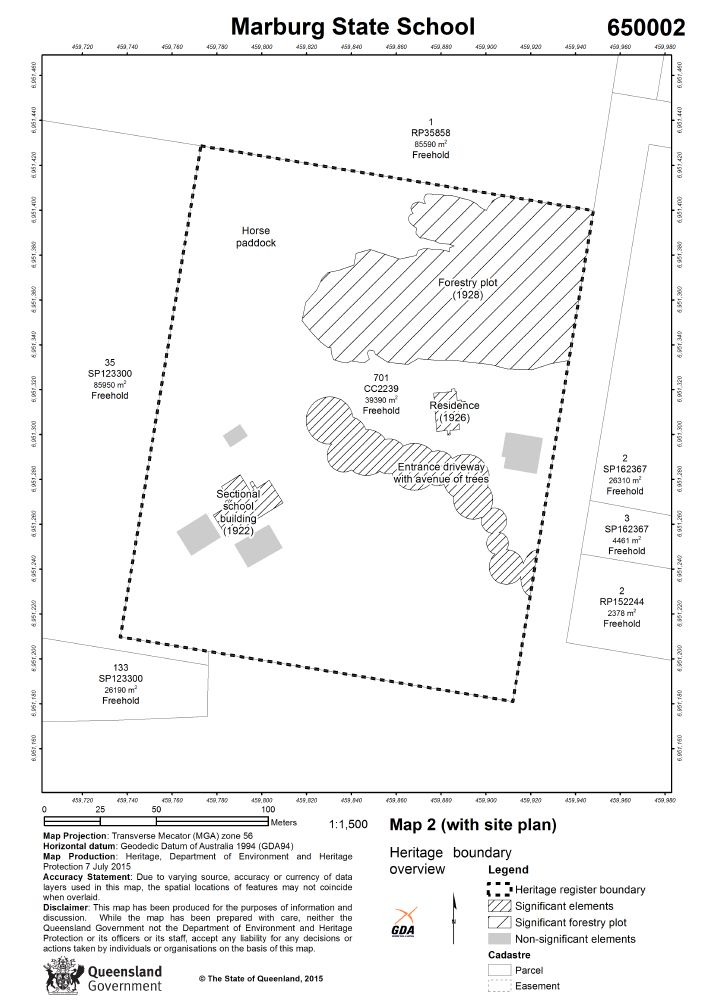
Map of school layout, 2015

Marburg State School occupies the whole of an approximately 4 hectares (9.9 acres) sloping block within the small rural township of Marburg in the Brisbane Valley. The school complex is accessed via Louisa Street and is surrounded by agricultural and residential properties. Visible from the school entrance and at the highest point of the site is a sectional school building (1922). East of the sectional school building, a teacher's residence (1926) faces south to front the entrance driveway. The landscaped grounds are well-established and include an avenue of mature fig trees along the length of the curved driveway that provides an attractive entrance to the school. The layout of the grounds is clearly divided into areas based on use, including: a teaching area with playing field at the southern end; a residence with garden area to the east; a mature forestry plot in the northeastern corner; and a former horse paddock in the northwestern corner. The school is prominent in its rural location and is clearly visible from the adjacent Warrego Highway.

=== 1922 sectional school building (Block A) ===
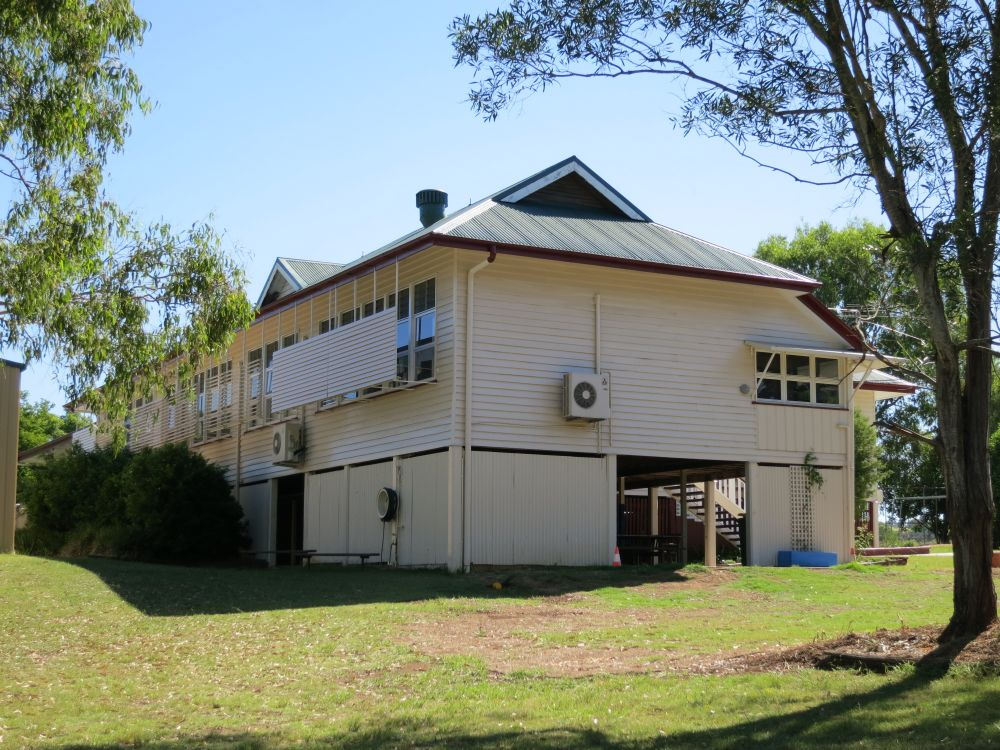
Sectional school building from rear, 2015

The 1922 sectional school building is a highset, timber-framed structure that is clad in weatherboards and stands on combination of timber, concrete and metal stumps. The building is long and narrow, running on a northeast-southwest axis, and has a corrugated metal-clad, Dutch-gable roof with circular roof ventilators and additional gablets on the southeastern side. The teachers annexe on the northwestern side has a hipped roof. The building has timber floors and access is via timber stairs to the northern verandah (now enclosed).

An early timber-framed casement window with a horizontally centre-pivoting fanlight is retained in the southwestern wall of the teachers annexe. Recent additions that are not of cultural heritage significance include: modern windows; verandah wall openings; flat sheet wall and ceiling linings; and linoleum and carpet floor linings.

The northern verandah has a raked ceiling clad in v-jointed (VJ) tongue and groove (T&G) timber boards. A small section of early VJ, T&G wall lining is located within the verandah wall of the teachers annexe.

The interior is divided into four classrooms by modern partitions, although timber lattice ceiling vents and metal tie rods indicate the original five-room layout. The coved ceiling is hipped at the end-walls and is lined with VJ, T&G timber boards.

The teachers annexe comprises four administration and storage rooms organised around a central hallway. The two northwesternmost rooms are a modern extension. All walls and ceilings are lined with modern flat sheeting, and the timber floor is lined with modern linoleum.

The understorey has a concrete slab floor and is partially enclosed with timber battening and corrugated metal sheeting. It is used as a shaded play-space and has storage rooms at the southwestern end, enclosed with corrugated metal sheeting - some sections of the corrugated metal sheeting have early Lysaght stamps.

=== 1926 teacher's residence ===
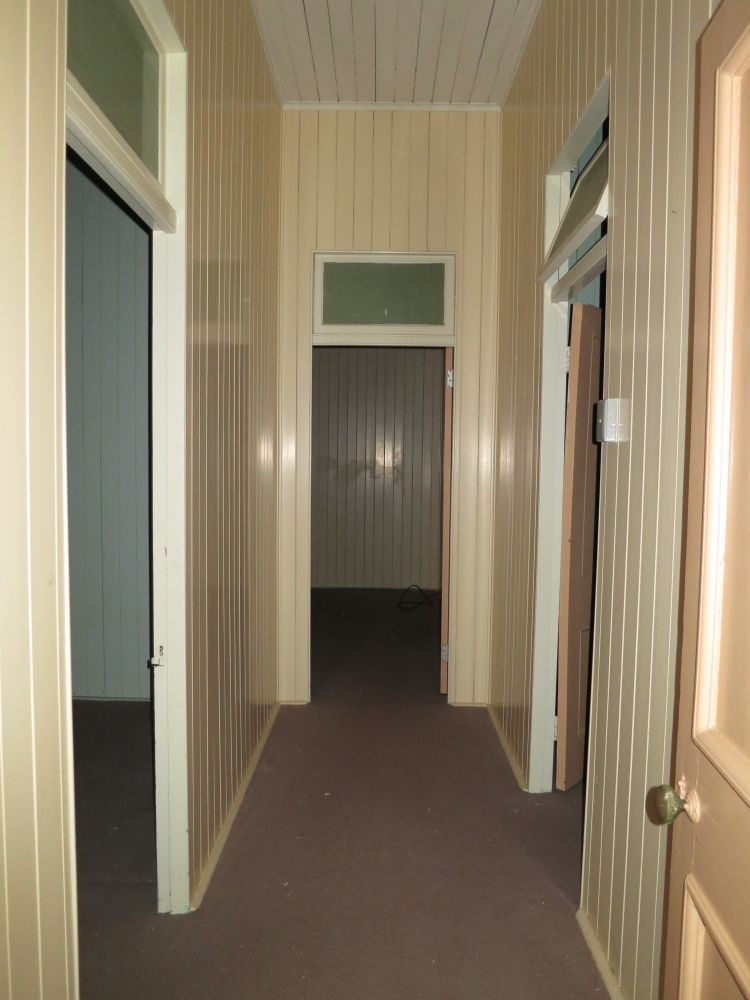
Interior hall of residence showing vertically-jointed tongue-and-groove joinery, 2015

The 1926 teacher's residence is highly intact. The building is highset on tall concrete stumps, clad in weatherboards and has a corrugated metal-clad hipped roof. It comprises a core of bedrooms, with a verandah (now enclosed) at the front (south) and a dining verandah (enclosed) at the rear (north), and a rear wing attached to the northern side of the dining verandah. Timber stairs provide access to the front and rear verandahs. Wide, timber-framed, corrugated metal-clad window hoods shelter windows on the eastern and western sides, and rounded metal hoods shade the northern windows. Early timber joinery is retained throughout the building including: low-waisted French doors with 2-light fanlights from the core to the front verandah and dining room; low-waisted timber doors with fanlights to the core's central hallway; VJ timber-clad doors to the pantry in the rear wing and to the understorey washhouse enclosure; and a double-hung timber sash window to the pantry. Other windows are modern, set within original openings. The entry landing (including toilet) on the eastern side of the building is modern and not of cultural heritage significance.

The front verandah retains its single-skin verandah wall, with post and belt rails supporting VJ, T&G timber boards. Its raked ceiling is lined with modern flat sheeting.

The core comprises three bedrooms and a living room, centred around a short hallway. The rear wing includes an eastern kitchen with stove alcove, a central bathroom and pantry, and an eastern former servant's room. All interior walls and ceilings are lined with VJ timber boards; the north and south walls of the dining verandah are single-skin with post-and-belt-rails exposed. The walls of the stove alcove are lined in flat sheeting. A small window seat built into the western wall of the dining room is lined in VJ, T&G timber boards. Skirtings and cornices throughout are timber and of a simple profile. The building's timber floors are lined with modern carpet and linoleum.

The understorey has a concrete slab floor and is enclosed with timber, battened screens. A washhouse at northeastern end is enclosed with flat sheeting.

=== Grounds and Views ===
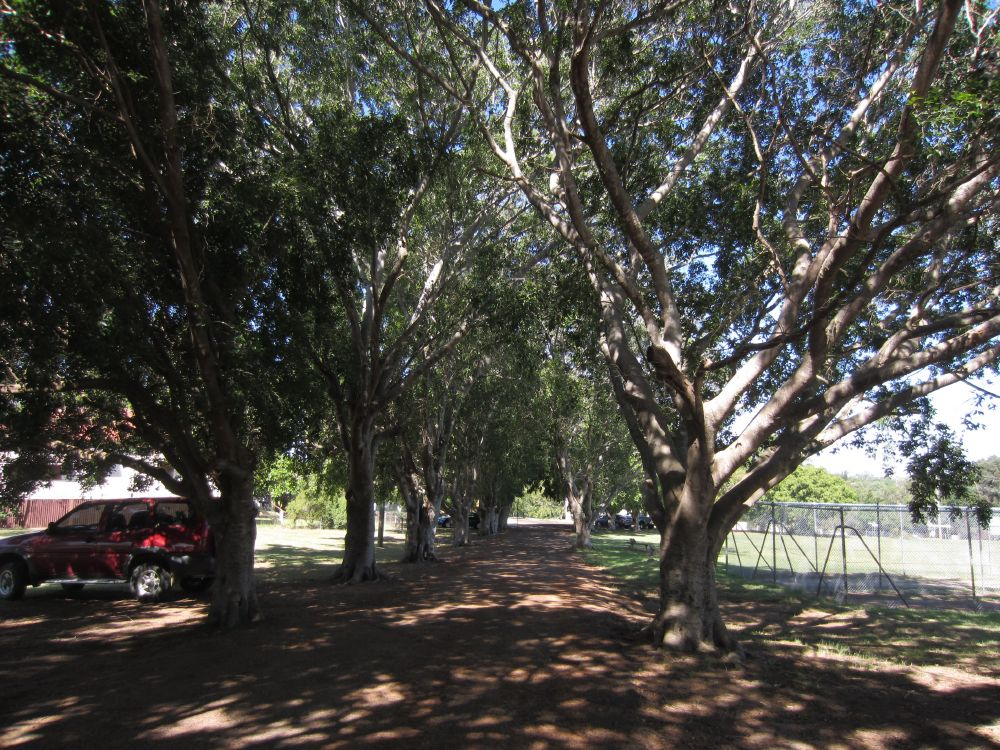
Driveway with fig trees, 2015

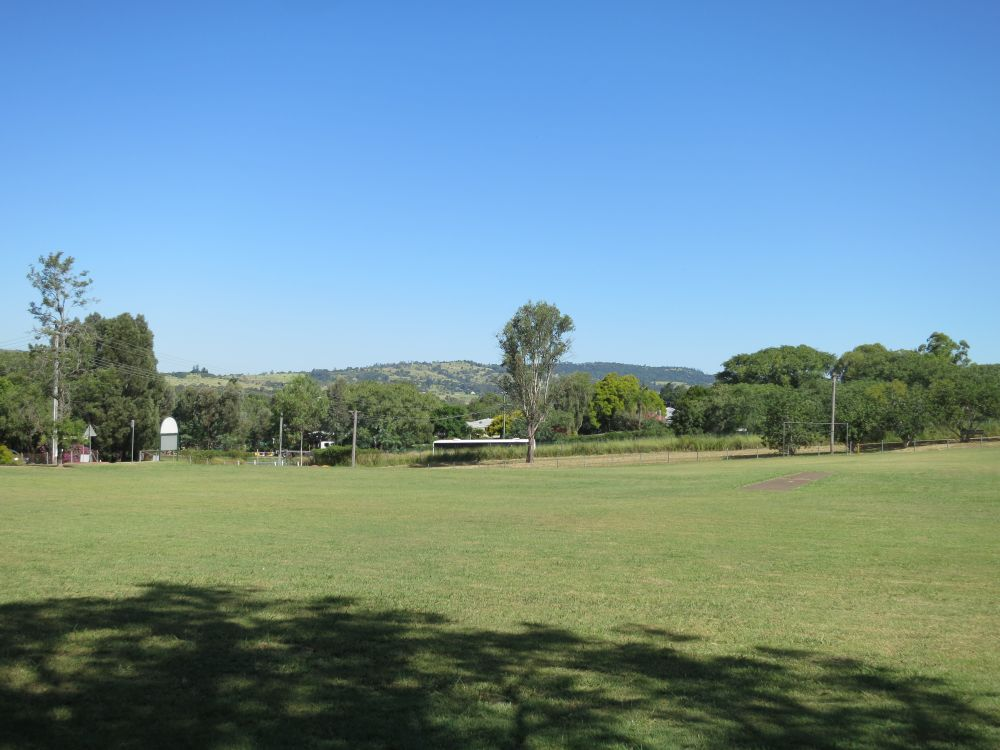
Playing fields, 2015

The school grounds are established and well laid-out. The school is prominent in its location and the sloping nature of the site provides opportunities for views of the surrounding, rural area to be obtained from within the school grounds and the school buildings.

The driveway, running approximately northwest from the school entrance toward the sectional school building, features an avenue of established small-leaf fig trees (Ficus spp.), with one large leaf-fig tree (Ficus sp.) at the southern end. The avenue enhances the school's prominence in its location, provides a picturesque setting for the school and generates a strong sense of place upon entry to the school.

North of the teacher's residence, a variety of hoop pines (Araucaria cunninghamii), Norfolk pines (Araucaria heterophylla) and kauri pines (Agathis robusta) stand within a forestry plot; sections of which are planted in rows. The forestry plot is accessed from the southern end via a gateway with a metal sign featuring the words, "Environmental Park; QLD's 1st School Forestry Plot; est. 1928".

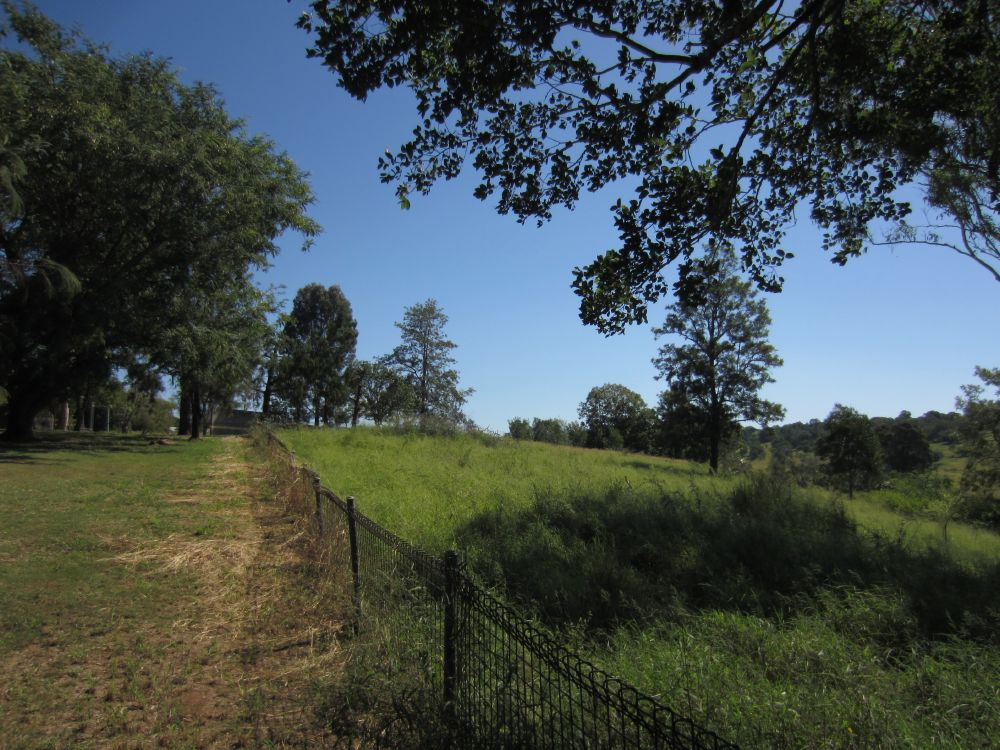
Horse paddock, 2015

In the northwestern corner of the grounds is the horse paddock - a fenced, grassed area that slopes down to a northern creek-bed and features several shade trees.

=== Other structures ===
Sheds, play equipment, walkways, tennis courts, the multi-purpose hall, and other structures within the school grounds are not of cultural heritage significance.

== Heritage listing ==
Marburg State School was listed on the Queensland Heritage Register on 9 October 2015 having satisfied the following criteria.

The place is important in demonstrating the evolution or pattern of Queensland's history.

Marburg State School, established in 1879, is important in demonstrating the evolution of state education and its associated architecture in Queensland. It retains good examples of standard government designs that were architectural responses to prevailing government educational philosophies. At Marburg State School these standard designs are: a sectional school building (1922), which demonstrates the evolution of Department of Public Works (DPW) timber school designs to provide equally for educational and climatic needs; and the highly-intact teacher's residence (1926), which provides evidence of Departmental policy to provide accommodation for married male head teachers as an inducement to teach in country areas and to provide a resident caretaker on the site.

The school is important surviving evidence of the establishment of rural schools in Queensland, a popular initiative to provide a practical education for rural students and encourage them to stay on the land.

The forestry plot (1928), the first established in Queensland, is important surviving evidence of a movement to convey the economic and environmental importance of forestry to students while creating an attractive landscape feature and income for schools.

The place is important in demonstrating the principal characteristics of a particular class of cultural places.

Marburg State School is important in demonstrating the principal characteristics of Queensland state schools with their later modifications. These include: timber-framed buildings constructed to standard designs by the Queensland Government; and generous, landscaped sites with mature shade trees and play areas.

The teacher's residence is an intact example of its type - retaining its highset, hipped roof and weatherboard-clad form with early joinery; and comprising a core of three bedrooms and a living room, a front verandah (now enclosed), a rear dining verandah (enclosed), and a rear kitchen and bathroom wing.

The sectional school building is a good example of its type, retaining its highset form with play space beneath, gable roof, blank end walls, northern verandah, large south-facing windows, projecting teachers rooms, and internal features such as coved ceilings lined in tongue-and-groove boards.

The forestry plot at Marburg is an example of its type, containing several pine tree species planted in rows.

The place is important because of its aesthetic significance.

Marburg State School, with its grounds designed by William Ernest Bick (horticulturalist, landscaper and curator of the Brisbane Botanic Gardens 1917–40), is important for its aesthetic significance. It possesses beautiful attributes due to the intactness of its well-composed original layout, which includes: a Fig-lined driveway that gracefully sweeps from the entrance, uphill around the school oval and to the school buildings; a forestry plot; a horse paddock; mature trees; and expansive rural views. The sloping grounds are divided into areas designated for specific uses, creating a harmonious park-like landscape within a rural setting.

The place has a strong or special association with a particular community or cultural group for social, cultural or spiritual reasons.

Schools have always played an important part in Queensland communities. They typically retain significant and enduring connections with former pupils, parents, and teachers; provide a venue for social interaction and volunteer work; and are a source of pride, symbolising local progress and aspirations.

Marburg State School has a strong and ongoing association with the Marburg community. It was established in 1879 through the fundraising efforts of the local community and generations of Marburg children have been educated there. The place is important for its contribution to the educational development of Marburg and district and is a prominent community focal point and gathering place for social and commemorative events with widespread community support.
