= Woolshed, Queensland =

Woolshed
- Suburb
- Interactive map of Woolshed
- Coordinates: 27.5980°S 152.5019°E
- Country: Australia
- State: Queensland
- City: Ipswich
- LGA: City of Ipswich
- Location: 20.4 km (12.7 mi) ENE of Laidley; 24.0 km (14.9 mi) NW of Rosewood; 37.2 km (23.1 mi) W of Ipswich; 74.7 km (46.4 mi) WSW of Brisbane

Government
  - State electorate: Ipswich West
  - Federal division: Blair

Area
  - Total: 11.5 km^{2} (4.4 sq mi)
- Elevation: 556 m (1,824 ft)

Population
  - Total: 8 (2021 census)
  - Density: 0.70/km^{2} (1.80/sq mi)
- Time zone: UTC+10:00 (AEST)
- Postcode: 4340
- Mean max temp: 26.2 °C (79.2 °F)
- Mean min temp: 16.9 °C (62.4 °F)
- Annual rainfall: 1,110.6 mm (43.72 in)
Suburbs around Woolshed
Hatton Vale	Hatton Vale	Tallegalla
Summerholm	Woolshed	The Bluff
Summerholm	Grandchester	Calvert

Woolshed is a rural locality in the City of Ipswich, Queensland, Australia. In the 2021 census, Woolshed had a population of 8 people.

== Geography ==
Woolshed is west of Ipswich.

Unlike other places in City of Ipswich, Woolshed lies within the Lockyer Creek catchment, not the Bremer River catchment. Most of the terrain is sloped as Woolshed occupies a section of the Little Liverpool Range. The area is undeveloped with few roads and little land clearing undertaken.

The Woolshed Creek Reserve was established in Woolshed as part of the Ipswich Enviroplan to preserve habitat suitable for koalas.

=== Climate ===
Woodshed's position on the Little Liverpool Range, at 556 m (1,824 ft) above sea level causes it to have a monsoon-influenced humid subtropical climate (Köppen: Cwa) with quite hot, very wet summers and very mild, dry winters. The wettest recorded day was 2 February 2019 with 368.8 mm (14.52 in) of rainfall. Extreme temperatures ranged from 39.8 °C (103.6 °F) on 27 November 2018 to −2.0 °C (28.4 °F) on 30 June 2002.

Climate data for Woolshed (19.42°S 146.54°E) (556 m (1,824 ft) AMSL) (1998-2025)
Month	Jan	Feb	Mar	Apr	May	Jun	Jul	Aug	Sep	Oct	Nov	Dec	Year
Record high °C (°F)	37.2 (99.0)	38.0 (100.4)	36.6 (97.9)	32.5 (90.5)	30.1 (86.2)	28.9 (84.0)	30.1 (86.2)	30.3 (86.5)	33.4 (92.1)	36.0 (96.8)	39.8 (103.6)	37.5 (99.5)	39.8 (103.6)
Mean daily maximum °C (°F)	28.7 (83.7)	28.3 (82.9)	27.8 (82.0)	26.4 (79.5)	24.0 (75.2)	21.9 (71.4)	22.0 (71.6)	23.5 (74.3)	25.8 (78.4)	27.7 (81.9)	28.5 (83.3)	29.4 (84.9)	26.2 (79.1)
Mean daily minimum °C (°F)	20.9 (69.6)	21.0 (69.8)	20.0 (68.0)	18.0 (64.4)	14.4 (57.9)	11.9 (53.4)	11.0 (51.8)	12.3 (54.1)	15.4 (59.7)	17.7 (63.9)	19.3 (66.7)	20.5 (68.9)	16.9 (62.4)
Record low °C (°F)	14.0 (57.2)	14.8 (58.6)	11.0 (51.8)	7.1 (44.8)	3.0 (37.4)	−2.0 (28.4)	−0.9 (30.4)	0.3 (32.5)	4.4 (39.9)	7.4 (45.3)	11.2 (52.2)	14.0 (57.2)	−2.0 (28.4)
Average precipitation mm (inches)	251.0 (9.88)	295.4 (11.63)	173.2 (6.82)	78.0 (3.07)	37.7 (1.48)	27.1 (1.07)	27.8 (1.09)	12.5 (0.49)	13.8 (0.54)	28.8 (1.13)	55.0 (2.17)	111.2 (4.38)	1,110.6 (43.72)
Average precipitation days (≥ 0.2 mm)	15.9	14.7	13.5	9.2	7.7	7.1	6.0	4.3	4.0	5.5	8.6	10.3	106.8
Average afternoon relative humidity (%)	73	78	67	66	59	59	52	53	54	59	63	66	62
Average dew point °C (°F)	20.8 (69.4)	21.3 (70.3)	19.1 (66.4)	17.2 (63.0)	13.3 (55.9)	11.3 (52.3)	9.2 (48.6)	10.5 (50.9)	12.8 (55.0)	15.9 (60.6)	17.7 (63.9)	19.4 (66.9)	15.7 (60.3)
Source: Bureau of Meteorology (1998-2025)

== Demographics ==
In the 2016 census, Woolshed had a population of 5 people.

In the 2021 census, Woolshed had a population of 8 people.

== Education ==
There are no schools in Woolshed. The nearest government primary schools are:

- Minden State School in Minden to the north-east
- Ashwell State School in Ashwell to the south-east
- Grandchester State School in neighbouting Grandchester to the south
- Hatton Vale State School in neighbouring Hatton Vale to the north-west

The nearest government secondary schools are:

- Rosewood State High School in Rosewood to the south-east
- Laidley State High School in Laidley to the south-west
