= Tallegalla, Queensland =

Tallegalla
- Suburb
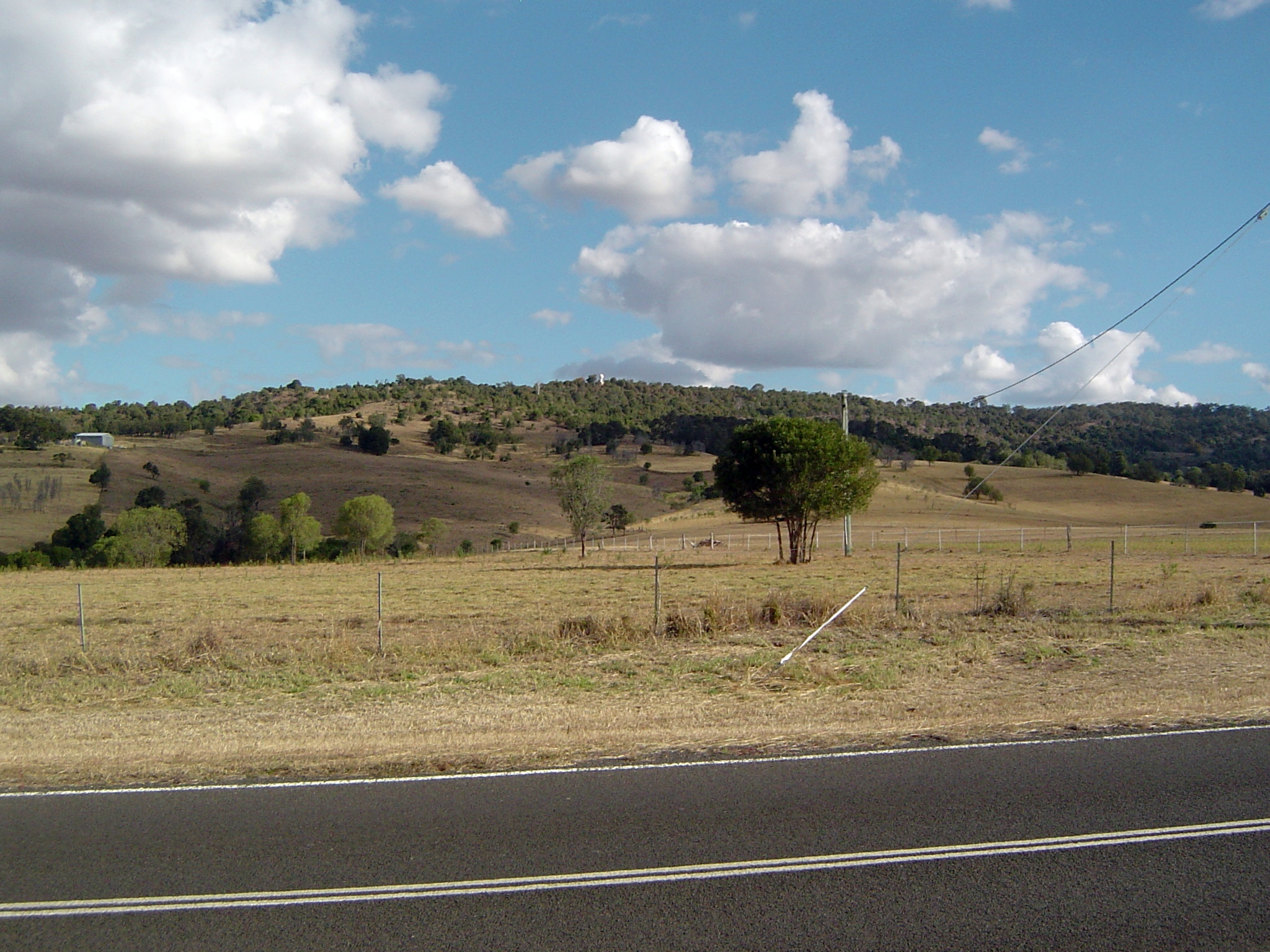
- Marburg weather radar, 2014

- Interactive map of Tallegalla
- Coordinates: 27.59°S 152.5547°E
- Country: Australia
- State: Queensland
- LGA: City of Ipswich
- Location: 5.9 km (3.7 mi) NNW of Rosewood; 25.5 km (15.8 mi) S of Ipswich; 59.7 km (37.1 mi) WSW of Brisbane CBD

Government
  - State electorate: Ipswich West
  - Federal division: Blair

Area
  - Total: 27.3 km^{2} (10.5 sq mi)

Population
  - Total: 351 (2021 census)
  - Density: 12.86/km^{2} (33.30/sq mi)
- Time zone: UTC+10:00 (AEST)
- Postcode: 4340
Suburbs around Tallegalla
Hatton Vale	Minden	Marburg
Woolshed	Tallegalla	Mount Marrow
The Bluff	Ashwell	Rosewood

Tallegalla is a rural locality in the City of Ipswich, Queensland, Australia. In the 2021 census, Tallegalla had a population of 351 people.

== Geography ==
Most of Tallegalla lies within the Lockyer Creek catchment area, but small portion exist in both the Brisbane River and Bremer River catchments. In the west of Tallegalla, the terrain is elevated by the Little Liverpool Range.

Rosewood–Marburg Road runs through from southeast to northeast.

== History ==
The origin of the suburb name is from the Latin word Talegalla which was the genus name for the Brush-turkey. John Dart, the first to settle in the area, choose the name when he applied to open a postal receiving office at his farm.

Tallegalla State School opened on 10 June 1879. It closed on 18 December 1992. It was at 2-6 Tallegalla Two Tree Hill Road (corner of Tallegalla Road, 27.59436°S 152.56469°E).

On Monday 17 May 1880, a Wesleyan Chapel was opened.

The Marburg railway line, which operated from 1911 to 1964, had a number of stations in the locality (from north to south):

- Birru railway station (27.5946°S 152.5810°E)
- Talegalla railway station (27.6001°S 152.5719°E)
- Cabanda railway station (27.6117°S 152.5790°E)

== Demographics ==
In the 2011 census, Tallegalla had a population of 549 people.

In the 2016 census, Tallegalla had a population of 326 people.

In the 2021 census, Tallegalla had a population of 351 people.

== Heritage listings ==
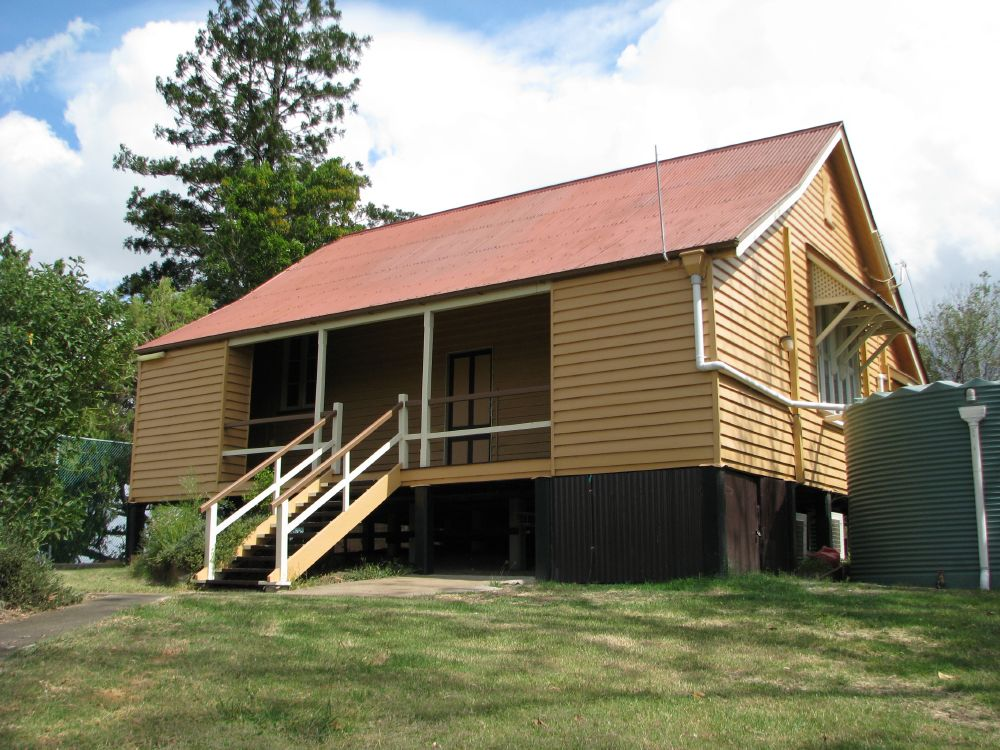
Tallegalla State School building, 2009

Tallegalla has a number of heritage-listed sites including:

- the former Tallegalla State School, 2-6 Tallegalla Two Tree Hill Road (corner of Tallegalla Road
- Tallegalla Cemetery: Memorial and monumental area

== Education ==
There are no schools in Tallegalla. The nearest government primary schools are Minden State School in neighbouring Minden to the north, Marburg State School in neighbouring Marburg to the north-east, and Ashwell State School in neighbouring Ashwell to the south. The nearest government secondary school is Rosewood State High School in neighbouring Rosewood to the south-east.
