= Tallegalla State School =

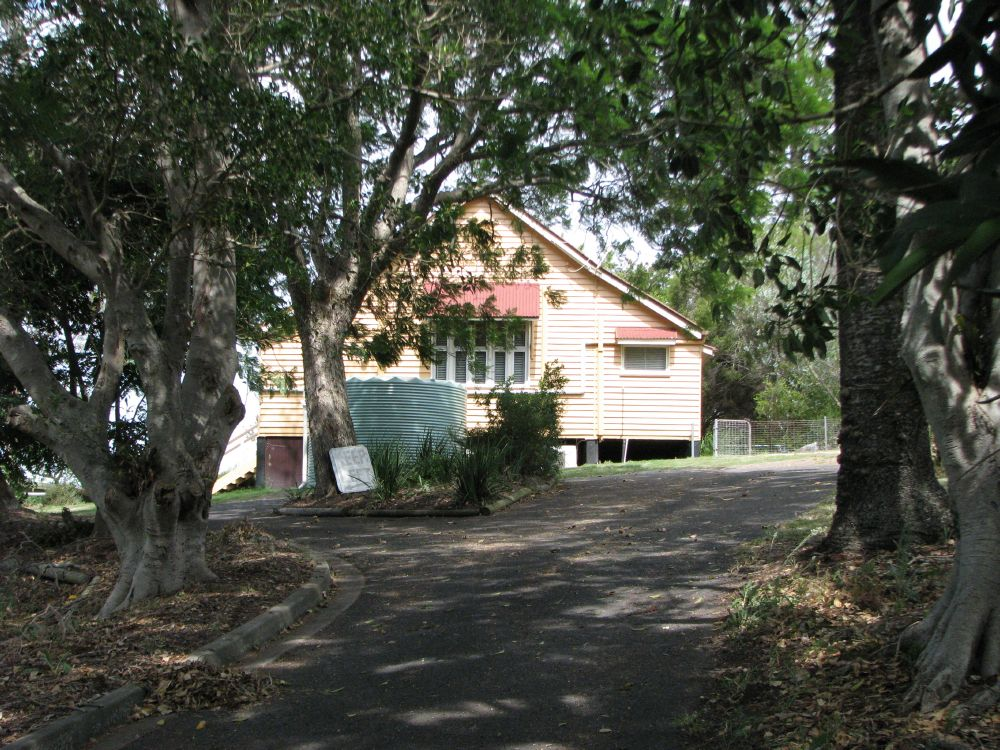
- Tallegalla State School, 2009

- Location within Queensland Location within Australia
- 27.5942°S 152.5645°E
- Location: Rosewood-Minden Road, Tallegalla, City of Ipswich, Queensland, Australia

History
- Design period: 1870s–1890s (late 19th century)
- Built: 1879–1955

Queensland Heritage Register
- Official name: Tallegalla State School (former)
- Type: state heritage (built)
- Designated: 2 February 1998
- Reference no.: 601687
- Significant period: 1870s–1880s (historical); 1870s–1930s (fabric school); 1930s (fabric residence)
- Significant components: garden/grounds, play shed, school/school room, residential accommodation – headmaster's house

Tallegalla State School is a heritage-listed former state school at Rosewood-Minden Road, Tallegalla, City of Ipswich, Queensland, Australia. It was built from 1879 to 1955. It was added to the Queensland Heritage Register on 2 February 1998.

== History ==
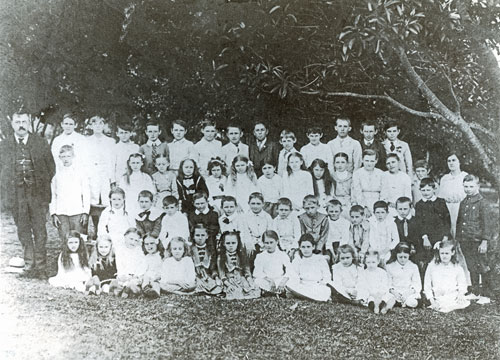
Tallegalla State School students, circa 1915

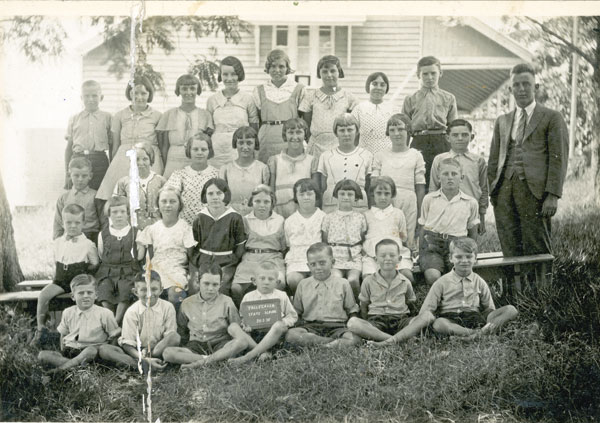
Tallegalla State School students, 1935

The Tallegalla School was opened on 10 June 1879 as a state school for the local area known as the Rosewood Scrub. A timber school building and timber residence were erected at that time and the residence was replaced in 1931 by the present building.

The Rosewood Scrub, an area comprising what is now Tallegalla, developed in the late 1870s as settlers followed timber getters who cleared some of the dense vine scrub previously thought to be impenetrable. By 1880 fifty selections were taken up in the area, mostly by German migrants who were arriving in Queensland under migration schemes run by the Queensland Government aimed at encouraging closer settlement of rural areas. After the Land Act of 1868 land in the Rosewood Scrub, to the west of Brisbane, was opened for clearing and settlement. The area became known as Tallegalla and an official survey was completed in July 1872. A small township developed which comprised school, rail station, post office, two churches, hotel and cemetery. In 1997 very little remains of the Tallegalla township, with only the school and cemetery apparent.

Requests were made to the Queensland Government for the provision of a state school in the Tallegalla area in January 1876 by a school committee formed for the purpose of lobbying the government. The secretary of the School Committee, Mr John Dart, wrote a number of letters to the government in 1876 suggesting possible sites and seeking a formal survey of the area. A formal application for the establishment of a state school was lodged after a public meeting on 14 October 1876. The application suggested a two-acre site on a prominent corner of Portion 513, parish Walloon, owned by a local farmer, Wilhelm Arndt who was willing to donate the land from his 100-acre selection. The land offered by Mr Arndt was centrally located, near a local post office and on an elevated site visible from a great distance. According to the application form about fifty local children between the ages of 5 and 14 were expected to attend the school and a local subscription of about £50 toward building costs was expected. The two acres of land was officially surveyed on 6 November 1876 and the site was gazetted as a reserve for a school on 15 August 1878. This significant time delay in the registering of the school reserve resulted in the land not being excluded from Portion 513 when a survey was drawn of the larger block for the Certificate of Title. This situation was rectified in June 1938 when the land was officially excluded from the Title.

Construction at the school began, with local subscriptions totalling £56. The first structure on the site was a one roomed timber school building, apparently designed by Queensland Colonial Architect, Francis Drummond Greville Stanley, before the design of schools in Queensland became the domain of the Department of Education in about 1880. Stanley instigated in Queensland a system of standardised school designs which could be used in a number of locations, a system which occurred previously through default. The gabled roof building designed for use at Tallegalla was elevated on low timber stumps and was flanked on the north and south by full length verandahs which were partially enclosed at the two ends of the northern side and housed hand basins. The school remains much in the same form as its original design and was lined internally in 1926 and the southern verandah was enclosed gradually from 1955. A more significant change to the building occurred in 1938 when several openings were altered to allow for better natural lighting. Whereas the openings previously were designed to allow for uniform light from all directions, new thinking in the mid 1930s indicated that lighting from some directions was more conducive to studying. Associated with this work was the internal painting of the school.

Another important element of the school site was the teachers residence which was not completed with the original school building, though by 1880 plans had been made for its erection. Residences were an important element of school sites as it was thought they attracted better quality teaching staff. By 1880 the students at Tallegalla School were taught by Mr John Marquis, who replaced Mr Edward Henry Vivian Dunbar, the first head teacher at the school. In 1880 the School Committee raised sufficient funds to enable the Education Department to finance construction of a residence which was a simple four roomed cottage surrounded by verandahs. Many changes were made to this residence in the late nineteenth and early twentieth century before it was replaced in 1931. Alterations included adding a rear verandah in 1892, internal lining in 1895; the addition of a detached kitchen and bathroom in 1898 and the addition of two detached bedrooms in 1911 to house the large family of the then Head Teacher, Daniel Courtney.

By 1932 a new timber residence was constructed replacing the early residence. The tender of EJ Wilton from East Ipswich was accepted for the construction of the building for £514 and for construction to be complete within 8 weeks from the acceptance date which was 1 December 1932. The building was a standard Type 3 School Residence designed by the Works Department with examples of that type built throughout Queensland between 1929 and 1950. Construction of the building was completed in February 1933 and by 1937 the verandah of the building which was located on the south eastern corner was enclosed. Since then, a toilet has been added to the verandah space of the building.

Associated with this work was the removal of a detached bedroom wing from the original residence and its reconstruction as a play shed. An earlier play shed was constructed on the grounds by the School Committee in about 1906 but by 1932 this octagonal timber shade structure was deteriorating and thought to be a health hazard. The Department of Education were supportive of the removal of the detached wing for use as a replacement playshed if the work was done at no cost to the Department. By 1972 another steel framed playshed was constructed and the former building became used as a store.

The school grounds have seen significant changes during the life of the school. From the late 1880s, head teacher, John William Watkins, instigated a tree planting programme at the school which saw many of the trees which exist on the site today, including the avenue of jacarandas and figs lining the driveway.

The school closed in 1992 due to low student numbers.

== Description ==
The Tallegalla School is sited on a ridge on the highest point of the surrounding landscape. The school is bordered by Minden-Rosewood Road and Twotree Hill Road. The site comprises a number of buildings, including the original school room, a teacher's residence from 1932, an early playshed and a latter playshed, several corrugated tanks on stands, two concrete septic tanks, and a number of large established trees and gardens.

Access is provided to the school via a driveway from Minden-Rosewood Road. The driveway curves eastward toward the school building and terminates in a small round driveway. Flanking the driveway are a number of established trees including several jacarandas, a Moreton Bay fig and a bunya pine. The principal buildings are aligned parallel with Minden Rosewood Road, with the residence closest to the corner of the two roads and separated from the school site with a fence.

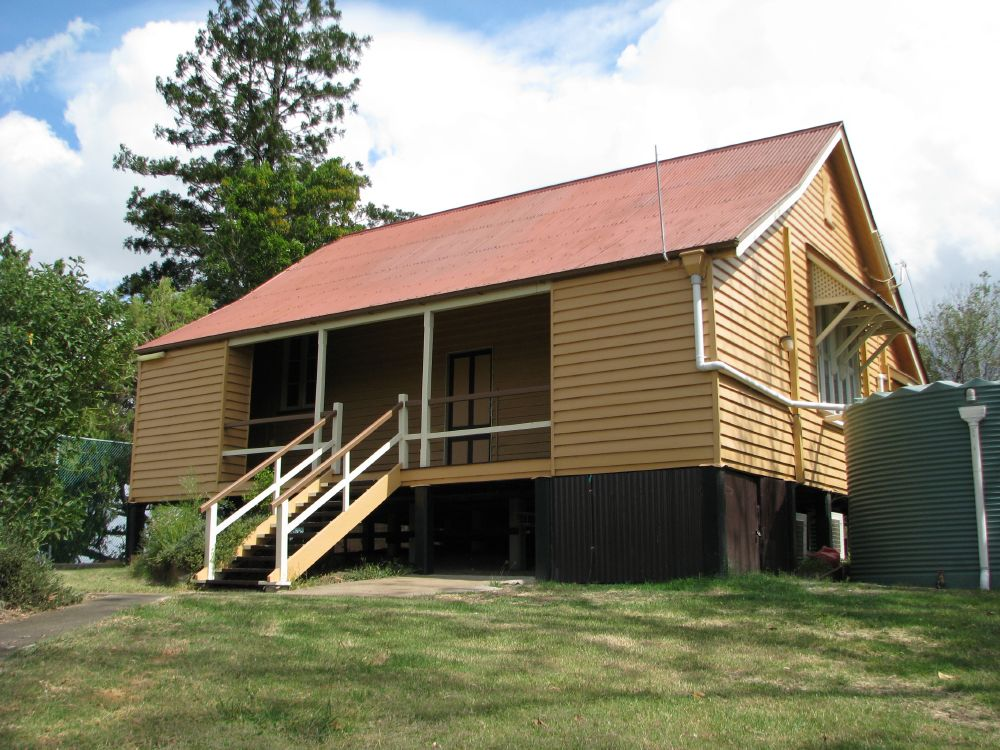
School building, 2009

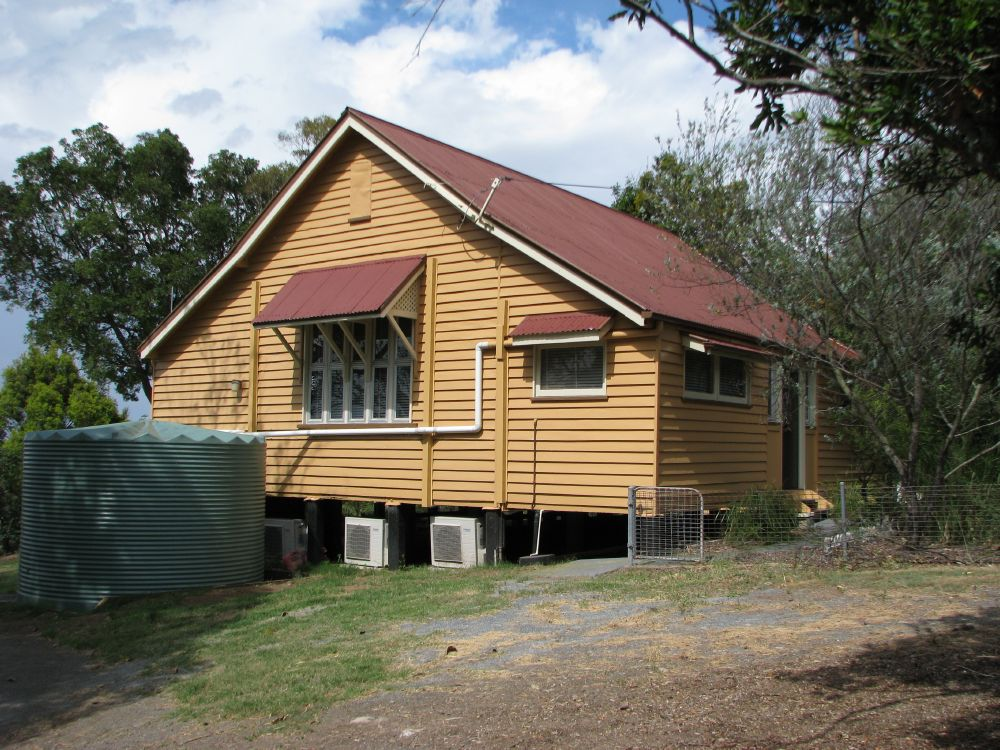
Rear view, 2009

The school building is a one storeyed gable roofed structure, elevated on low timber stumps. The timber framed building is clad externally with horizontal weatherboards and internally with VJ boarding. The roof is clad with corrugated iron and this is also used for window awnings on the eastern and western elevations. The building has a rectangular plan with partially enclosed verandahs on the northern and southern elevations, over which the pitch of the roof becomes more gradual. A small, centrally located, open tread timber stair provides access to the northern elevation of the building which is lined with a semi-open verandah, only enclosed near the two ends to form small enclosures which were an original feature of the design. Flanking the stair are timber posts, through which a simple two rail timber balustrade runs, and forms the stair balustrade. Centrally located on this and on the southern face of the building are simple entrance doors. The entrance door on the northern elevation is flanked by two casement windows made from the original sash windows. The interior of the building is lined with VJ boarding on the walls and ceilings and the timber boarded floor is covered with carpet.

The elevated residence is an asymmetrical building with hipped and gabled corrugated iron clad roof. The timber framed building is clad externally with horizontal weatherboards and internally with VJ boards. The building comprises five principal room including a large kitchen with early stove recess, a bathroom and separate toilet and an enclosed verandah on the south eastern corner. Open tread timber stairs access the front, southern side of the house and the rear, northern elevation. The building has a number of casement windows in groups of four on the front elevation, groups of three lining the enclosed verandah, and, elsewhere, groups of two. Corrugated iron clad window hoods, with sides of timber battening, provide sun shading to many of the pairs of casements. Internally the building is clad with VJ boarding on the walls and ceilings and has a timber boarded floor. The internal doors are generally four panelled with high mid (or lock) rails.

The early play shed is a lowset, fully enclosed, timber framed and weatherboard clad building, with a gabled corrugated iron roof. The building has two timber doors on the northern facade both surmounted by operable transom windows. The doors are timber boarded and internally braced. The building has a number of early six paned vertical sash windows. Internally the space is undivided and has VJ timber boarded walls, timber floor and timber boarded ceiling. Early fittings, including shelving and cupboards are found inside.

The more recent playshed is a steel framed, open structure comprising corner posts supporting a shallow pitched iron clad gabled roof awning and a concrete slab floor. It is built into sloping ground and has two low concrete block lined, retaining walls. There are a number of corrugated iron water tanks on the site, all elevated on timber or iron frames. Two concrete septic tanks indicate where toilets once existed, to the north of the school building.

== Heritage listing ==
The former Tallegalla State School was listed on the Queensland Heritage Register on 2 February 1998 having satisfied the following criteria.

The place is important in demonstrating the evolution or pattern of Queensland's history.

The Tallegalla State School is a remnant of a formerly larger settlement, Tallegalla, of which there are few remnants. The school was established in 1879 and reflects the closer settlement of the Rosewood Scrub area and reflects the development of rural country schools in Queensland

The place demonstrates rare, uncommon or endangered aspects of Queensland's cultural heritage.

The school building is a rare surviving example of a small timber school designed by colonial architect, FDG Stanley.

The place is important in demonstrating the principal characteristics of a particular class of cultural places.

The site, with intact school building, 1931 residence and former playshed is a good and characteristic example of a small rural state school.

The place is important because of its aesthetic significance.

The school grounds have considerable aesthetic significance as a local landmark, with large established trees and situated on an elevated site comprising well composed and prominent buildings within a picturesque garden setting.

The place has a strong or special association with a particular community or cultural group for social, cultural or spiritual reasons.

The school has important associations with the local community as a school as well as a local meeting place for about 115 years.

The place has a special association with the life or work of a particular person, group or organisation of importance in Queensland's history.

The school building has associations with FDG Stanley as one of his few surviving timber school buildings.
