= Minden, Queensland =

Minden
- Town
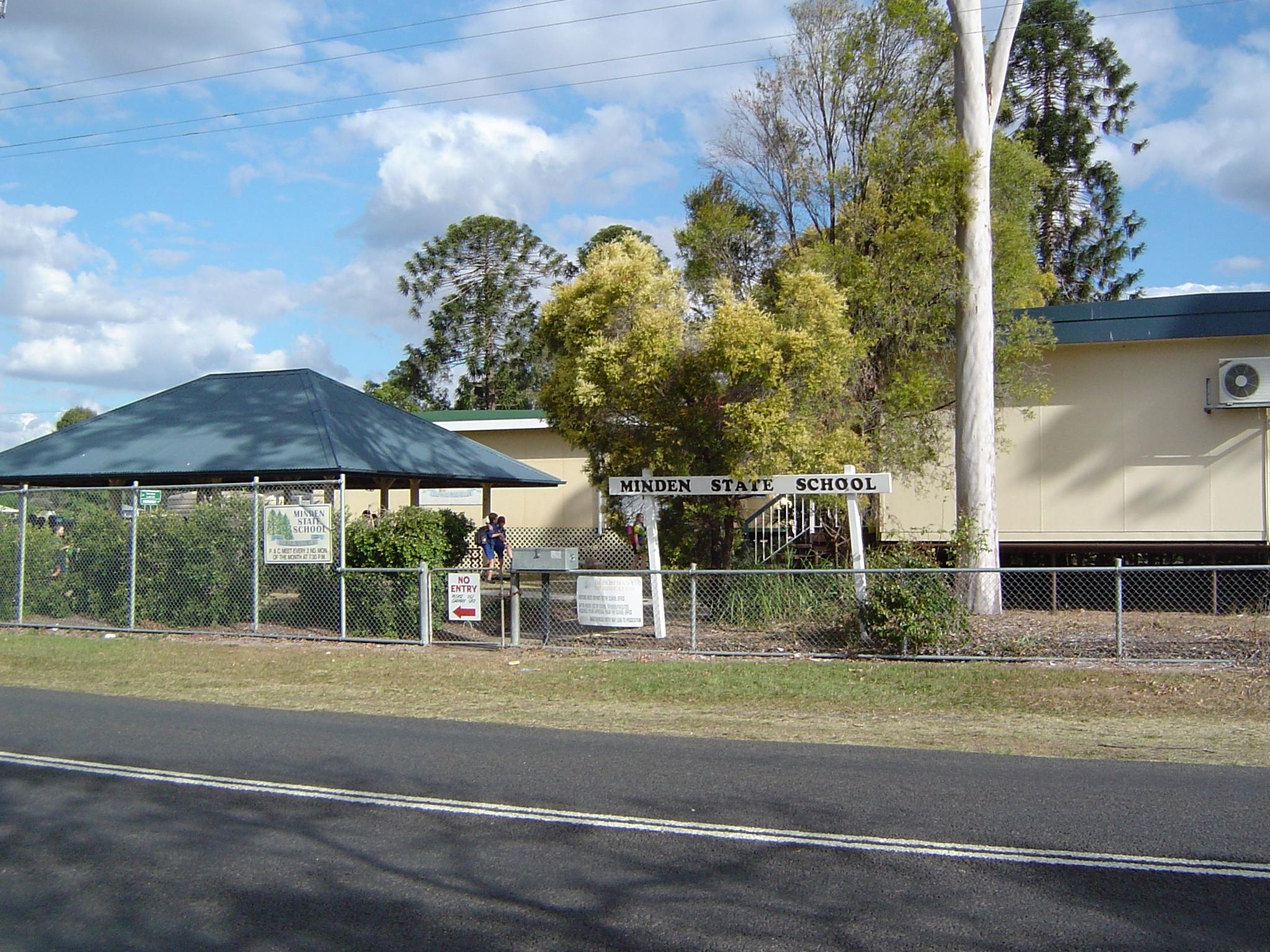
- Minden State School, 2014

- Interactive map of Minden
- Coordinates: 27.5570°S 152.5455°E
- Country: Australia
- State: Queensland
- LGA: Somerset Region
- Location: 26.3 km (16.3 mi) WNW of Ipswich; 63.7 km (39.6 mi) W of Brisbane CBD

Government
  - State electorate: Lockyer
  - Federal division: Blair

Area
  - Total: 21.1 km^{2} (8.1 sq mi)

Population
  - Total: 1,227 (2021 census)
  - Density: 58.15/km^{2} (150.6/sq mi)
- Time zone: UTC+10:00 (AEST)
- Postcode: 4311
Localities around Minden
Prenzlau	Coolana	Lark Hill
Hatton Vale	Minden	Marburg
Woolshed	Tallegalla	Tallegalla

Minden (German: [ˈmɪndn̩] MIN-den), formerly known as Frenchton, is a rural town and locality in the Somerset Region, Queensland, Australia. The town is 64 kilometres (40 mi) west of the state capital, Brisbane. In the 2021 census, the locality of Minden had a population of 1,227 people.

== Geography ==
Minden is located in the geographic region (but not the local government area) of Lockyer Valley at the northern foothills of the Little Liverpool Range. The Warrego Highway passes through Minden from east to west. It is the most southerly part of the Somerset Region local government area.

== History ==
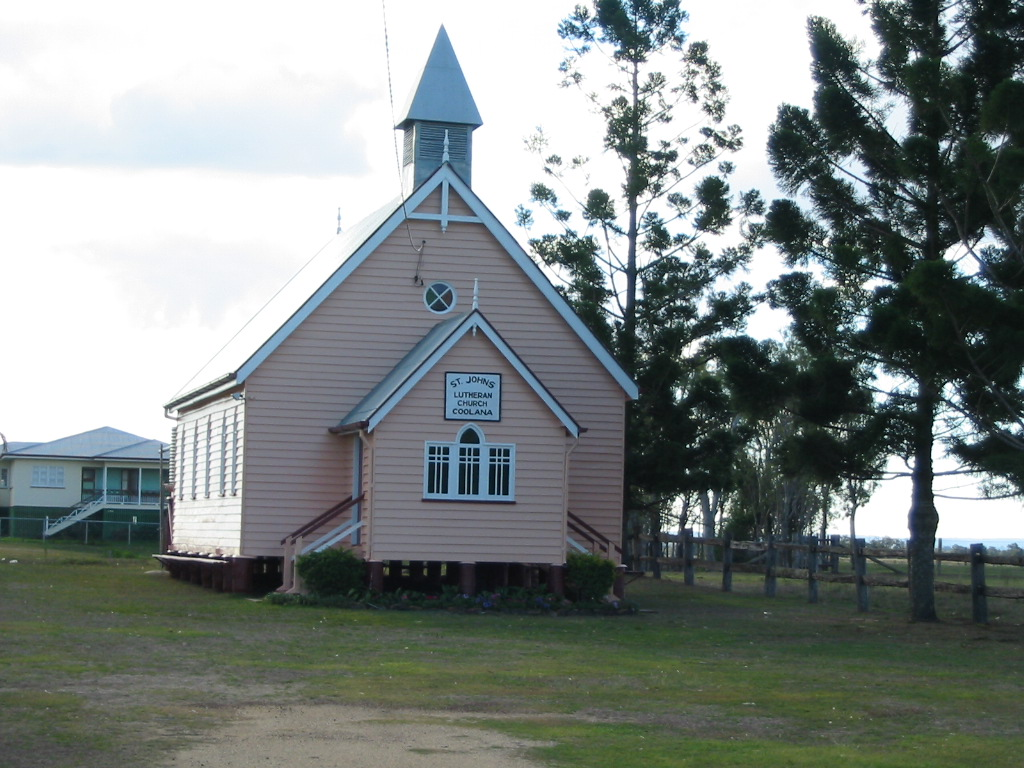
St John’s Lutheran Church Coolana, 2005

The area was originally known as Back Plains or Rosewood Scrub but was changed to Minden in 1879 at the request of German settlers, after the town of Minden in Westphalia, Germany. In 1916, during World War I, the name was changed to Frenchton due to anti-German sentiment but was restored to Minden in 1930.

Minden State School opened on 23 September 1878. In 1916 it was renamed Frenchton State School but was later restored to Minden State School.

On Thursday 8 December 1891, St John’s Lutheran Church Coolana opened in Minden. St John’s celebrated its 125th anniversary with a special service on Sunday 4 December 2016.

Frenchton Post Office opened on 1 July 1927 (a receiving office had been open from 1878, known as Rosewood Scrub until 1879 and Minden until 1916 during World War I), reverted to Minden in 1930 and closed in 1971.

== Demographics ==
In the 2011 census, the locality of Minden had a population of 1,093.

In the 2016 census, the locality of Minden had a population of 1,204 people.

In the 2021 census, the locality of Minden had a population of 1,227 people.

== Education ==
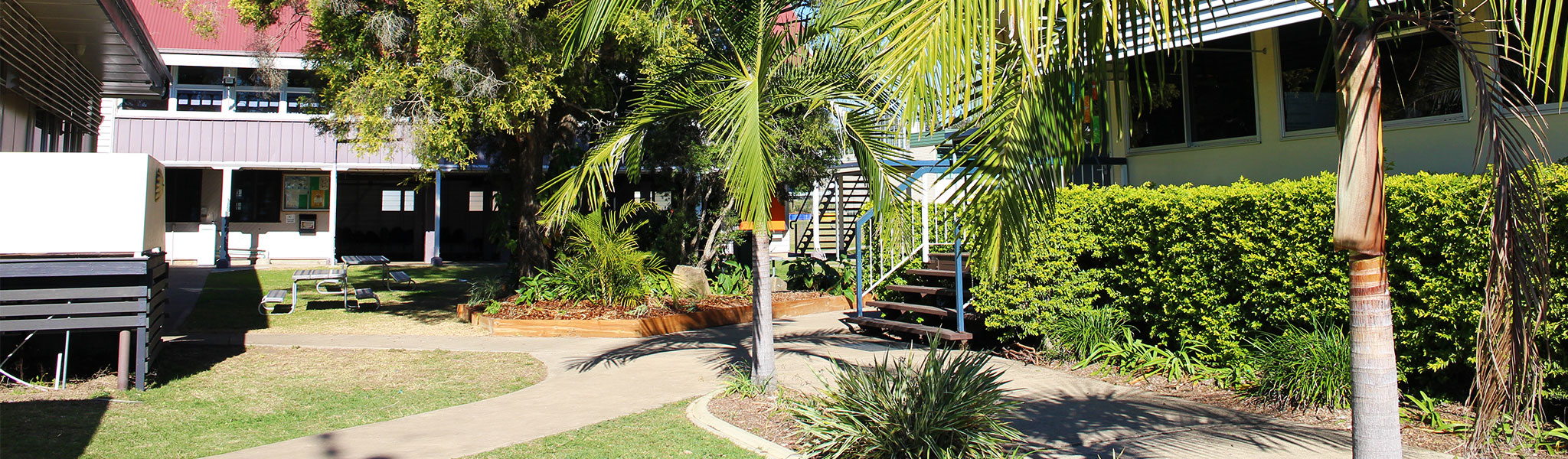
Minden State School, 2023

Minden State School is a government primary (Prep-6) school for boys and girls at 1032 Lowood-Minden Road (27.5547°S 152.5441°E). In 2018, the school had an enrolment of 189 students with 12 teachers and 8 non-teaching staff (5 full-time equivalent).

There are no secondary schools in Minden. The nearest government secondary schools are Lowood State High School in Lowood to the north and Rosewood State High School in Rosewood to the south-east.

== Amenities ==
St John’s Lutheran Church Coolana is at 774 Lowood Minden Road (27.5312°S 152.5446°E). Despite the name, it is not within the current boundaries of neighbouring Coolana.

Minden Baptist Church is at 978 Lowood Minden Road (27.5496°S 152.5413°E).

Zion Lutheran Church is at 712 Tallegalla Road (27.5592°S 152.5470°E).

St John’s Evangelical Lutheran Church is at 593 Tallegalla Road (27.5693°S 152.5448°E).

== Facilities ==
The Coolana Lutheran Cemetery is beside St John’s Lutheran Church Coolana (27.5315°S 152.5443°E).

Minden Baptist Cemetery is beside Minden Baptist Church (27.5494°S 152.5412°E).

Zion Lutheran Cemetery is beside Zion Lutheran Church (27.5589°S 152.5470°E).

St John’s Evangelican Lutheran Cemetery is beside St John’s Evangelican Lutheran Church (27.5691°S 152.5451°E).
