= Marburg railway line =

Former railway line in Queensland, Australia

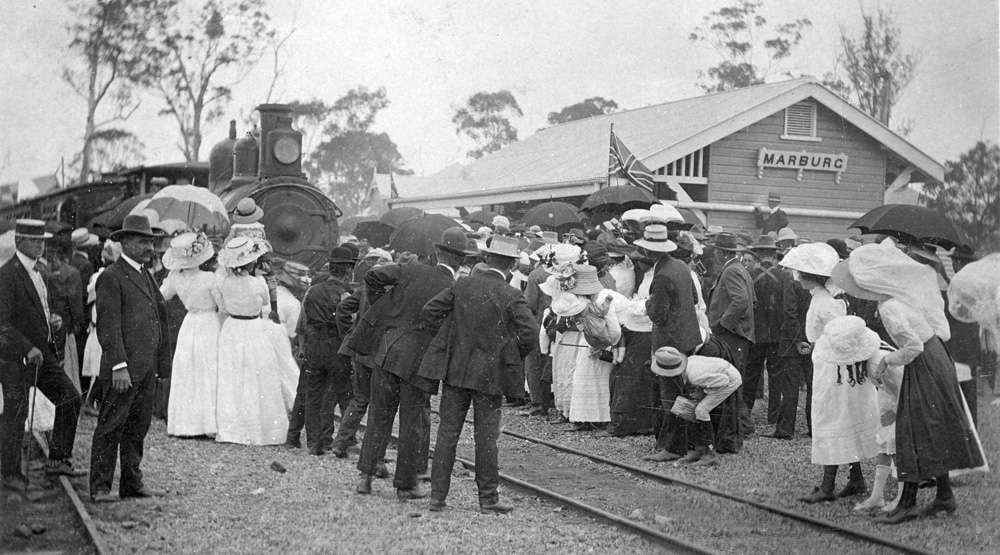
Opening of Marburg station in 1912

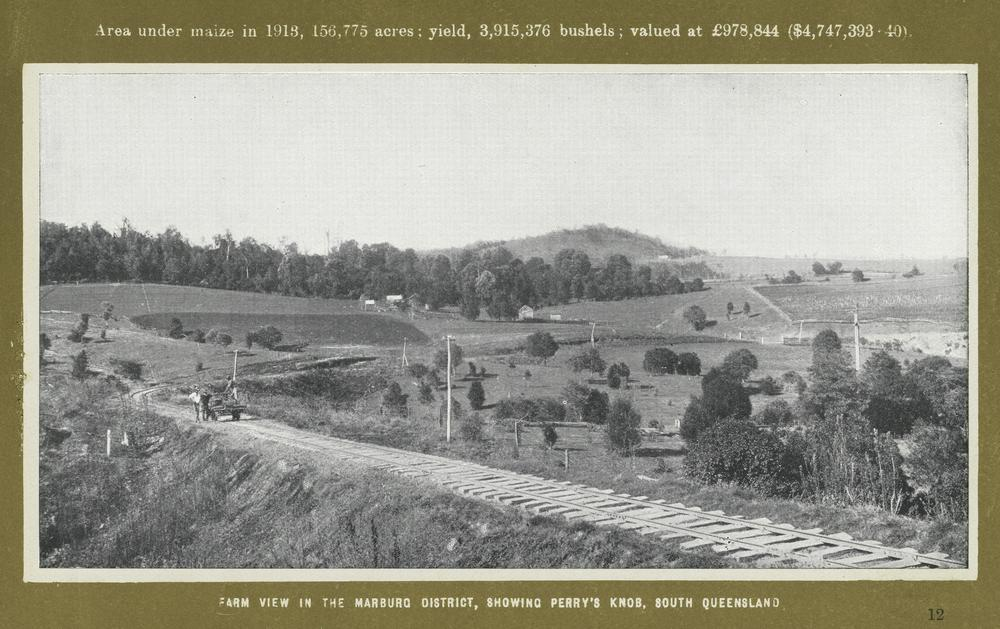
Marburg railway line near Perry's Knob, circa 1915

The Marburg Branch Railway is a branch line of the Main Line railway (from Brisbane to Toowoomba) in Queensland, Australia. It branches near Rosewood, which is about 20 kilometres west of Ipswich.

Previously known as Rosewood Gate, a railway gatekeeper was appointed to Rosewood in 1866. A waiting room and stationmaster's house were built in 1875 and a station office built in 1880 was replaced with the current building in 1918. Agricultural land to the north of Rosewood was not directly serviced by the Brisbane Valley railway line and, in December 1909, parliament approved the construction of a branch line to run about 15 kilometres to Marburg.

The Marburg locality was originally known as First Plain, then as Frederick after the name of an early settler, and lastly as Marburg after a Prussian town of the same name. During World War I the town was known as Townshend but the Marburg name was reinstated in 1920.

The line opened on 18 December 1911. The route was (from north to south):

- Marburg (27.5656°S 152.5944°E)
- Malabar (27.5839°S 152.5900°E)
- Birru (27.5946°S 152.5810°E)
- Tallegalla (27.6001°S 152.5719°E)
- Kunkala (27.6090°S 152.5618°E)
- Cabanda (27.6117°S 152.5790°E)
- Perrys Knob (27.6163°S 152.5838°E)
- North Rosewood (27.6289°S 152.5848°E)
- Rosewood (27.6431°S 152.5926°E)

A daily service to Ipswich departed Marburg each morning and returned in the evening. It was a two-hour journey by rail and over time the faster road trip prevailed. Coal mines in the region kept the line viable until they progressively closed.

The branch closed in stages – from Marburg to Birru in 1964, to Kunkala in 1970, Cabanda in 1973 and to Perry's Knob in 1979. The Rosewood Railway Museum now uses the upper section of the line. It has a display at Kunkala station.

== See also ==
- Rail transport in Queensland
