= Richard Ashwell =

English politician

Richard Ashwell (died 1392) was an English politician.

He was a member (MP) of the parliament of England for Gloucester in 1391.
