= Rachel Ashwell =

English businessperson

- Born: 30 October 1959 (age 67); Cambridge, England
- Other name: Rachel Greenfield
- Occupations: Decorator, author, entrepreneur
- Years active: 1989–present
- Known for: Shabby chic interiors

Rachel Ashwell (born Rachel Greenfield on 30 October 1959, in Cambridge, England) is an author, designer and entrepreneur who was raised in London.

== Early life ==
While in her teens, Ashwell, whose mother restored antique dolls and teddy bears and father was a secondhand rare books dealer, began selling antiques at London outdoor markets. She dropped out of school at the age of 16. She told The Sunday Times in 2004, "Following my father around the markets taught me how to make quick decisions about what was or was not worth buying."

== Career ==
Ashwell began a career in her native England as a wardrobe and prop stylist doing TV commercials and photo shoots. Ashwell moved to the United States in the early 1980s, opening her first store in Santa Monica in 1989. The name Rachel Ashwell, according to Huffington Post, has been synonymous with shabby chic for 20 years.

Ashwell started her home furnishings company and opened her first store in Santa Monica in 1989. Since she grew up going to flea markets, it was natural for her to use them as a source. She brought in her flea market finds to her shop for her customers and soon couldn't keep them in stock.

From 1999 to 2003, Ashwell hosted a TV show, titled "Rachel Ashwell's Shabby Chic," on E! and the Style Network. The New York Times, on the Encyclopædia Britannica, in its annual trend roundup in 1992, recognised Ashwell's company and her signature product, the slipcover, writing, "not the trim, well-fitting kind, but sloppy, wrinkled ones dubbed 'Shabby Chic' by a California company of the same name."

In 2004, Ashwell purchased a home in Malibu Colony. Oprah featured Ashwell on her website with a tour of Ashwell's beach house. During an appearances on The Oprah Winfrey Show on 1 January 2006, Oprah was quoted as saying, "Rachel Ashwell single-handedly turned shabby into chic and it caught on like wildfire!" In April 2010, Ashwell was one of 10 interior designers showcased on Oprah.com. When Ashwell's home sold in July 2010 for $3.55 million, the Los Angeles Times covered the sale, describing Ashwell as "the creator of the Shabby Chic brand."

As reported in The New York Times early in 2009, after 20 years in business, Ashwell's company filed bankruptcy, which caused her to re-evaluate. The site Shelterpop.com asked, "Can Rachel Ashwell's Shabby Chic Survive in Modern Times?" Ashwell, the article said, weathered the bankruptcy of her company "and embarked on a redux." That "redux" came in the form of an investor partner, which teamed with Rachel Ashwell to give the brand new life. The re-invented Shabby Chic Brands developed a new business model that expanded the line to include moderately-priced collections to be sold nationwide. Rachel has been partnering with Target since 2006 with Simply Shabby Chic, a Target exclusive brand. By mid-2011, Shabby Chic Brands expanded further into the United Kingdom, pairing the House of Fraser to offer the "Shabby Chic at House of Fraser" product line. She currently has three stores—New York, Los Angeles and London.

Ashwell keeps a blog where she updates viewers on her inspiration and travels. Also, Rachel Ashwell bedding is available at national retail chains and outlets. In 2011, Ashwell opened The Prairie by Rachel Ashwell, a bed and breakfast in Round Top, Texas.

== Books ==
- Shabby Chic (1996) (ISBN 0060982047)
- Rachel Ashwell's Shabby Chic Treasure Hunting and Decorating Guide (1998) (ISBN 0060392088)
- The Shabby Chic Home (2000) (ISBN 006039319X)
- The Shabby Chic Gift of Giving (2001) (ISBN 0060394013)
- Shabby Chic: Sumptuous Settings and Other Lovely Things (2004) (ISBN 006052393X)
- Rachel Ashwell's Shabby Chic Interiors (2009) (ISBN 1906525749)
- Shabby Chic Inspirations and Beautiful Spaces (2011) (ISBN 1907563598)
- Rachel Ashwell Couture Prairie: And Flea Market Treasures (2013)
