= Lanefield, Queensland =

Locality in Queensland, Australia

Lanefield
- Suburb
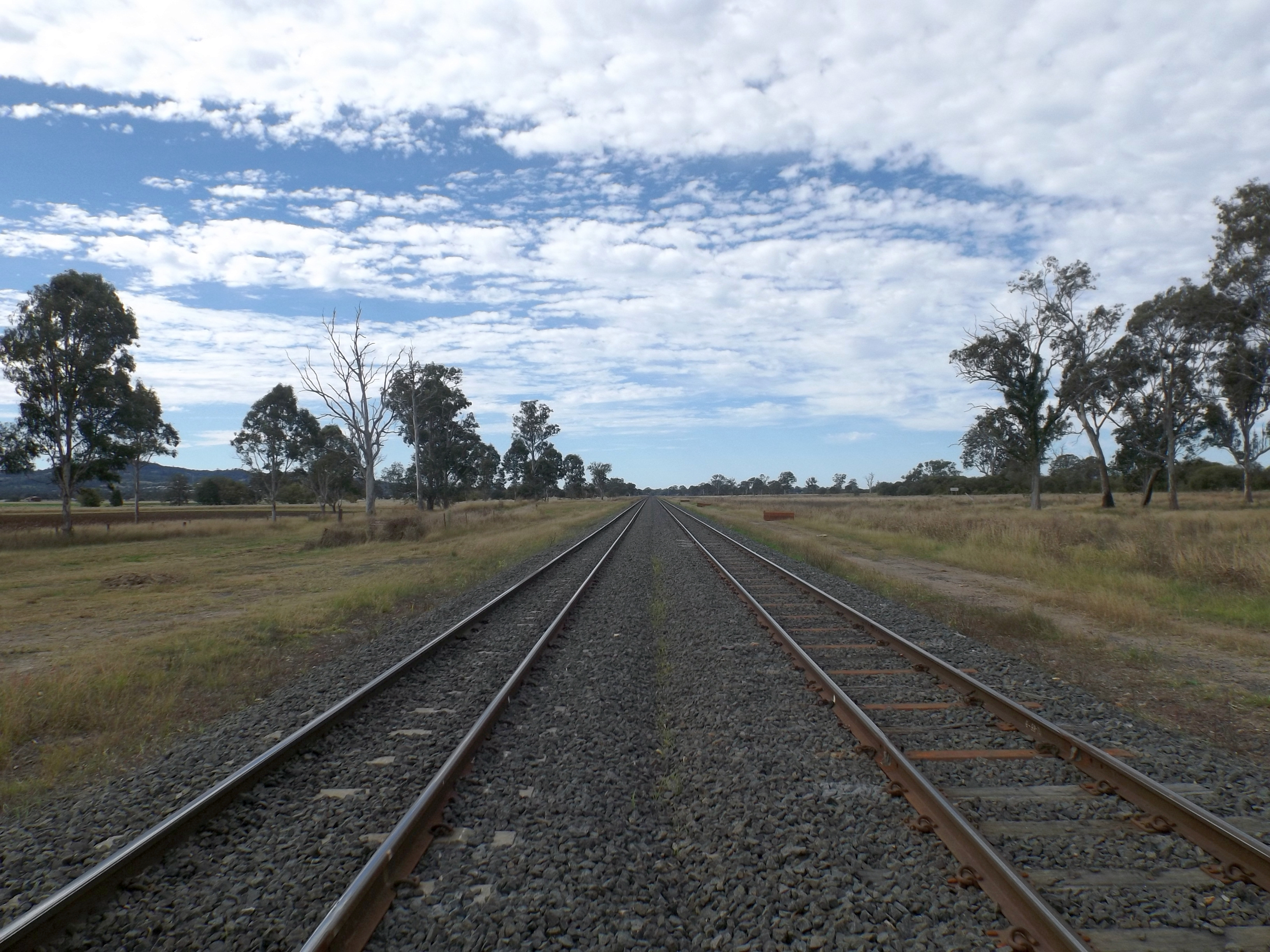
- Lane Road crossing, Main Line railway, 2015

- Interactive map of Lanefield
- Coordinates: 27.6583°S 152.5513°E
- Country: Australia
- State: Queensland
- City: Ipswich
- LGA: City of Ipswich
- Location: 3.7 km (2.3 mi) WSW of Rosewood; 24.3 km (15.1 mi) W of Ipswich CBD; 64.8 km (40.3 mi) SW of Brisbane CBD

Government
  - State electorates: Ipswich West; Scenic Rim
  - Federal division: Blair

Area
  - Total: 16.8 km^{2} (6.5 sq mi)

Population
  - Total: 97 (2021 census)
  - Density: 5.77/km^{2} (14.95/sq mi)
- Time zone: UTC+10:00 (AEST)
- Postcode: 4340
Suburbs around Lanefield
Calvert	Ashwell	Rosewood
Calvert	Lanefield	Rosewood
Calvert	Lower Mount Walker	Lower Mount Walker

Lanefield is a rural locality in the City of Ipswich, Queensland, Australia. In the 2021 census, Lanefield had a population of 97 people.

== Geography ==
Western Creek, a tributary of the Bremer River, passes through Lanefield. Brandy Gully is a creek which rises in Lanefield and is a tributary of Western Creek (27.6530°S 152.5719°E).

The Main Line railway passes through Lanefield. Lanefield was once served by Lanefield railway station (27.6547°S 152.5600°E), but is now abandoned.

== History ==
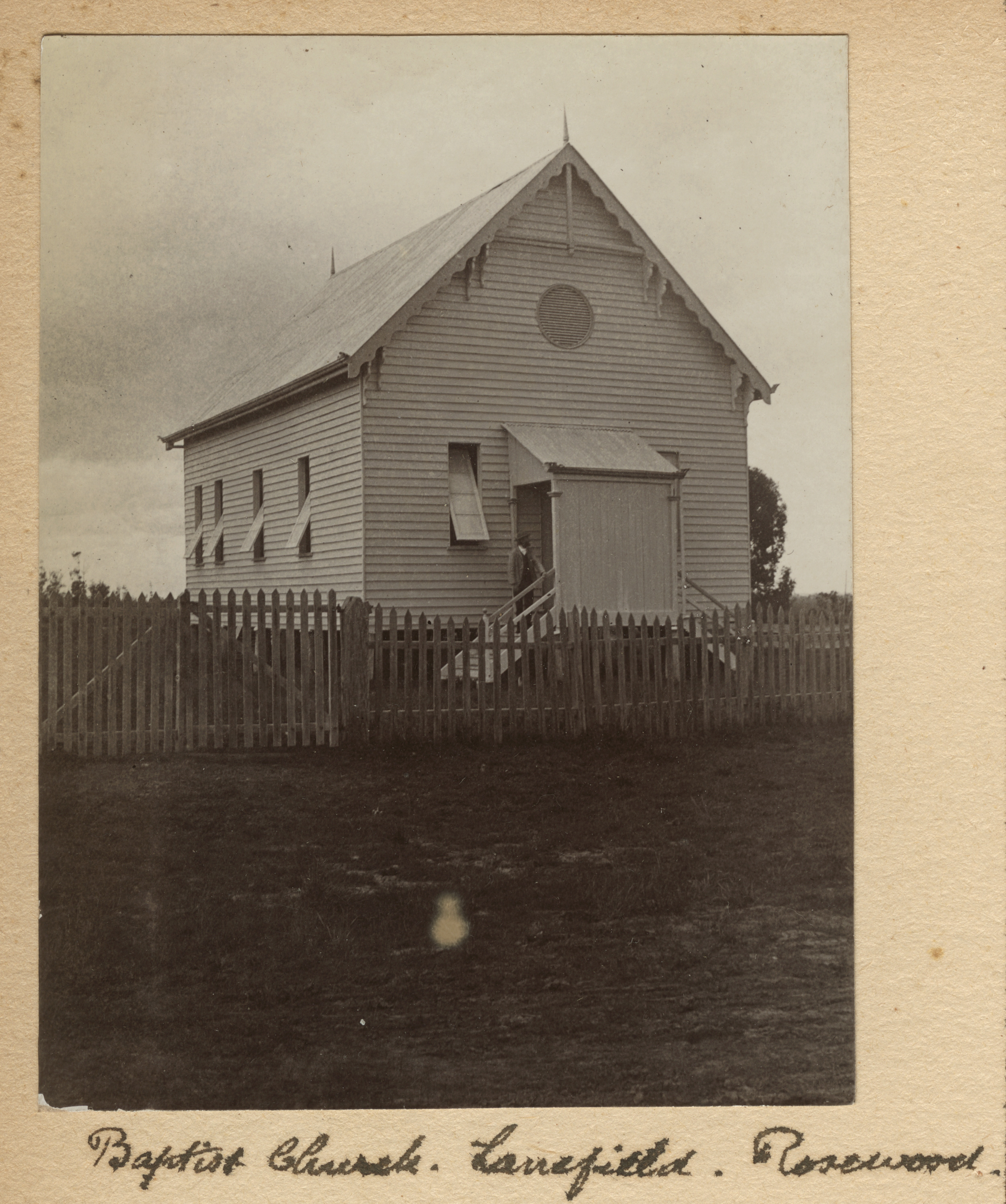
Lanefield Baptist Church, circa 1905

The locality takes its name from the Lanefield railway station which in turn was named by the Queensland Railways Department after pioneer settlers John and Clara Lane.

By 1873 a Wesleyan Methodist Church had opened at Brandy Gully.

In 1873 a Baptist church opened in Brandy Gully / Lanefield.

In the 1890s, dairying was an important industry, so a cooperative dairy was built. It closed in 1905.

Coal mining took place from 1918 to circa 1970. Visual evidence of previous coal mining exists in the form of old workings throughout the area.

== Demographics ==
In the 2016 census, Lanefield had a population of 107 people.

In the 2021 census, Lanefield had a population of 97 people.

== Education ==
There are no schools in Lanefield. The nearest government primary schools are Ashwell State School in neighbouring Ashwell to the north and Rosewood State School in neighbouring Rosewood to the east. The nearest government secondary school is Rosewood State High School in Rosewood.

Preceding station	Queensland Rail	Following station
Former service
Rosewood towards Brisbane	Main Line railway	Calvert towards Toowoomba
