= Little Liverpool Range =

Mountain range in Queensland, Australia

Little Liverpool
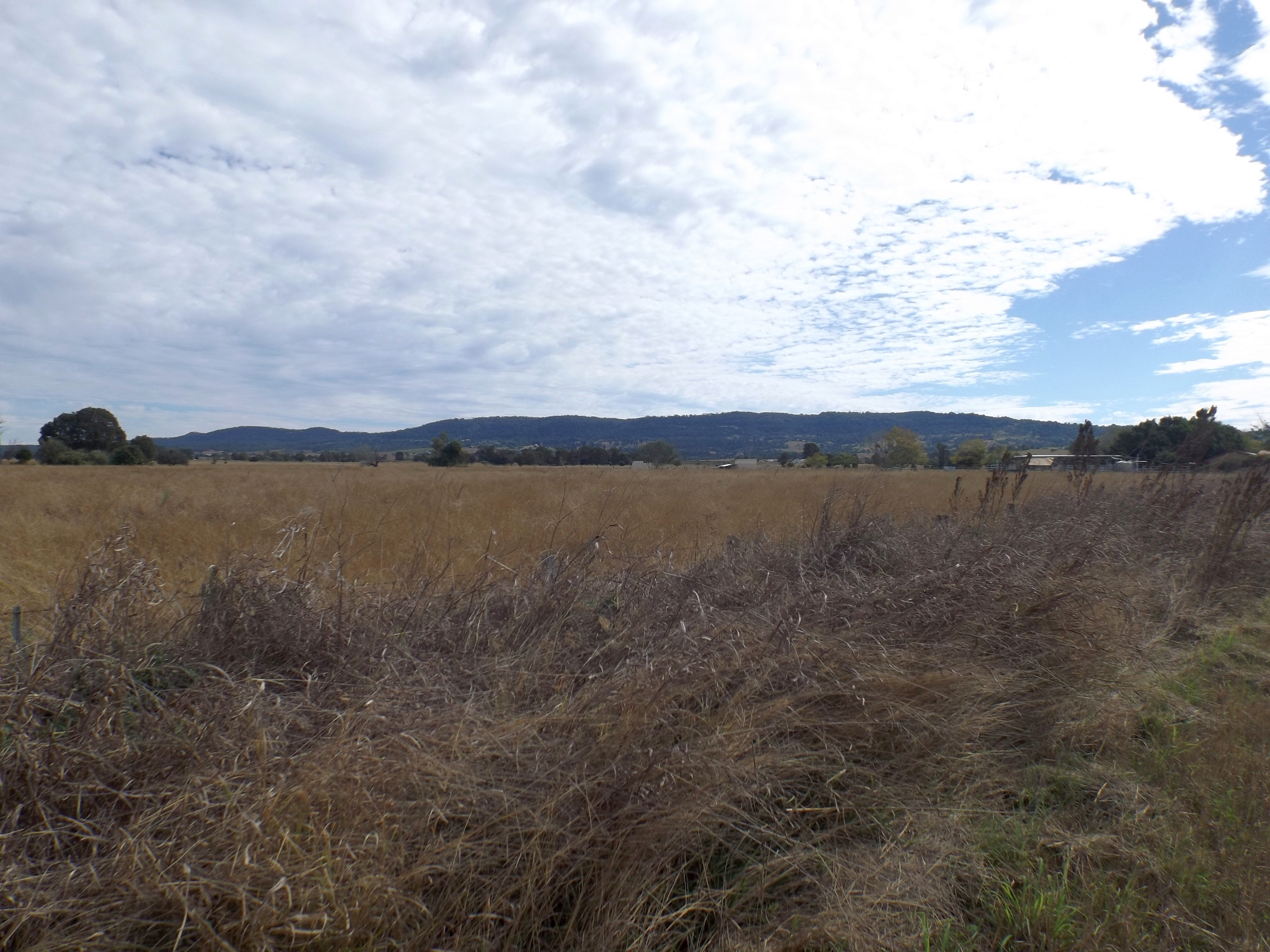
- View from Lanefield across Ashwell and Mount Bluff along the range, 2015

Geography
- Location within Queensland
- Country: Australia
- State: Queensland
- Region: South East Queensland
- Range coordinates: 27°38.3′S 152°28′E
- Parent range: Great Dividing Range

The Little Liverpool Range is a mountain range of the Scenic Rim and Lockyer Creek valley, part of the Great Dividing Range, which is located in the South East region of Queensland, Australia.

== Location and features ==
The range extends from the Main Range to the west of Aratula northwards to Plainland, where the Warrego Highway crosses the range. The range forms the drainage divide between the Bremer River valley from the Laidley Creek valley, a tributary of Lockyer Creek.

Allan Cunningham and his party were the first Europeans to explore the area. They crossed the range in 1829.

Mountain peaks in the Little Liverpool Range include Mount Castle, Kangaroo Mountain, Grass Tree Knoll, Mt Beau Brummell, Mount Stradbroke, Mount Grandchester, and Two Tree Hill. One of the regions weather stations Marburg radar station is positioned on the range at a height of 370 m (1,210 ft).

== Railways ==
The Little Liverpool Range was an obstacle that hindered development of a railway from Brisbane to Toowoomba. Under the range are two tunnels. One named Victoria Tunnel is 537 m (1,762 ft) long. It is the oldest and longest railway tunnel in the state. The railway has a gradient of between 1 in 50 to nil over the range.

== See also ==
- List of mountains in Australia
