= Ashwell, Devon =

Village in Devon, England

Coordinates: 50.5591°N 03.5551°W

Ashwell
- Location within Devon
- OS grid reference: SX8974
- Civil parish: Bishopsteignton
- District: Teignbridge
- Shire county: Devon
- Region: South West
- Country: England
- Sovereign state: United Kingdom
- Post town: tq14 9th
- Police: Devon and Cornwall
- Fire: Devon and Somerset
- Ambulance: South Western

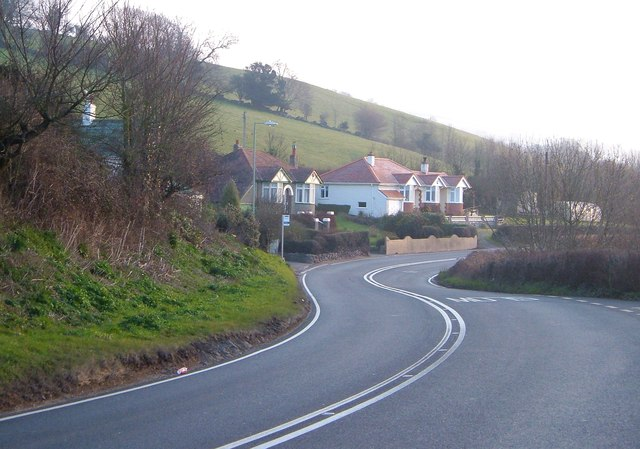

Ashwell is a hamlet in Devon, England.
