= Ashwell, Queensland =

Ashwell Ipswich, Queensland
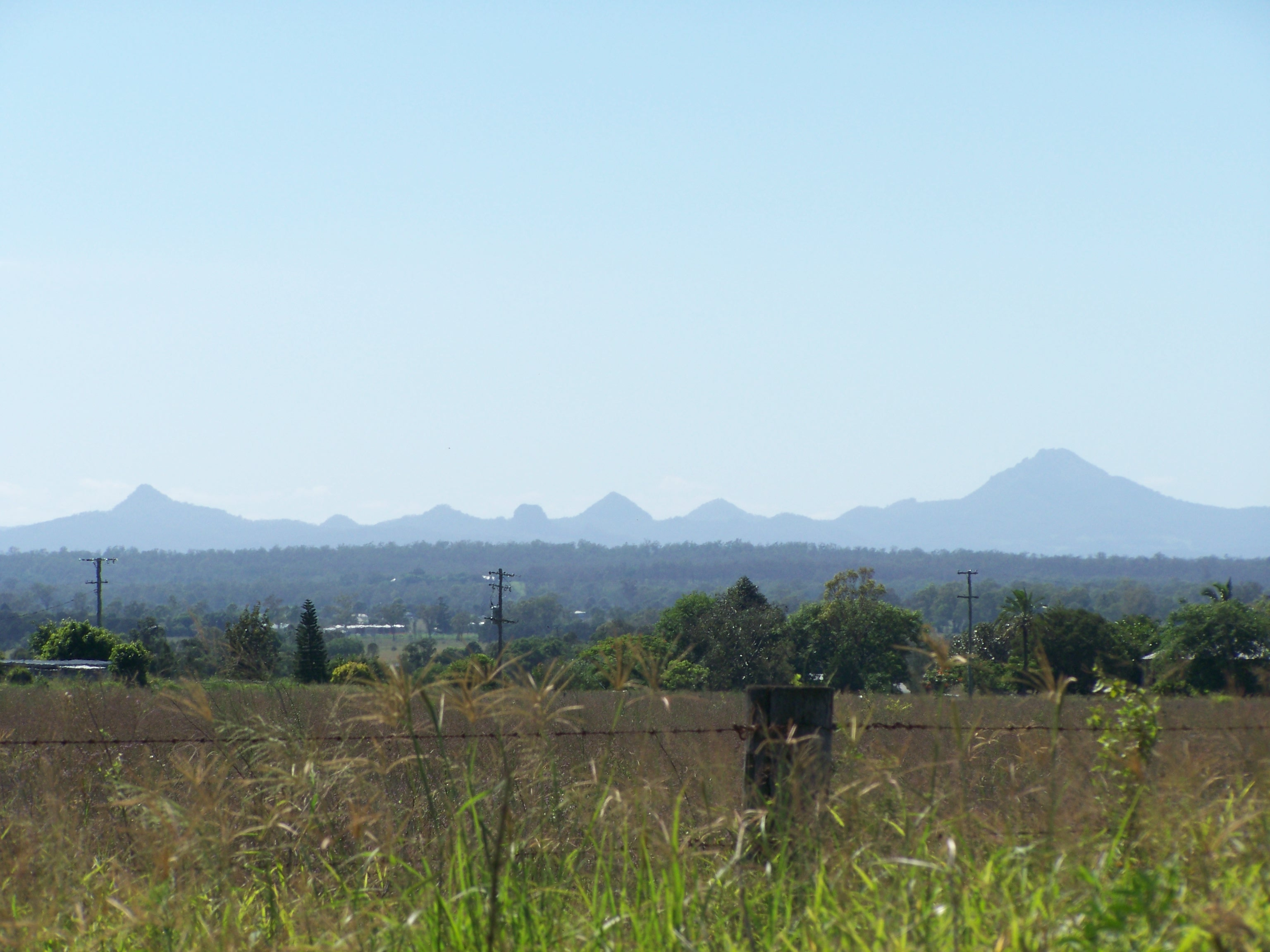
- Ashwell landscape, 2010

- Coordinates: 27.625°S 152.5558°E
- Population: 97 (2021 census)
  - Density: 12.93/km^{2} (33.5/sq mi)
- Postcode(s): 4340
- Area: 7.5 km^{2} (2.9 sq mi)
- Time zone: AEST (UTC+10:00)
- Location: 4.5 km (3 mi) NW of Rosewood; 24.1 km (15 mi) W of Ipswich; 65.7 km (41 mi) WSW of Brisbane CBD
- LGA(s): City of Ipswich
- State electorate(s): Ipswich West
- Federal division(s): Blair
Suburbs around Ashwell:
The Bluff	Tallegalla	Rosewood
The Bluff	Ashwell	Rosewood
Lanefield	Lanefield	Rosewood

Ashwell is a rural locality in the City of Ipswich, Queensland, Australia. In the 2021 census, Ashwell had a population of 97 people.

== Geography ==
Kunkala is a neighbourhood in the north of the locality (27.6095°S 152.5618°E) near the Kunkala railway station (27.6090°S 152.5618°E) on the now-closed Marburg branch railway line.

== History ==
The origin of the name Ashwell is from a town in the United Kingdom by the name of Ashwell. Walter Loveday and Henry Stevens provided an acre each of land for a school in this district to be named Ashwell after Walter Loveday's farm titled Ashwell which he named after Ashwell, United Kingdom.

Ashwell State School opened on 8 November 1887.

The name Kunkala may be an Aboriginal word for running fresh water.

== Demographics ==
In the 2011 census, Ashwell and nearby Lanefield had a population of 234 people.

In the 2016 census, Ashwell had a population of 85 people.

In the 2021 census, Ashwell had a population of 97 people.

== Education ==
Ashwell State School is a government primary (Prep-6) school for boys and girls at 35 Reinke Road (27.6294°S 152.5565°E). In 2018, the school had an enrolment of 58 students with 4 teachers and 8 non-teaching staff (4 full-time equivalent).

There is no secondary school in Ashwell. The nearest government secondary school is Rosewood State High School in neighbouring Rosewood to the south-east.
