= Woodlands School =

Woodlands school is a movement in Anishinaabe art.

Woodlands school or Woodlands School may refer to:

== Schools ==
=== United Kingdom ===
- Allestree Woodlands School, Derby, England
- Woodlands Academy, Coventry, a former secondary school in Coventry, England
- Woodlands School, Basildon, Essex, England

=== United States ===
- Woodlands Academy of the Sacred Heart, a Roman Catholic school in Lake Forest, Illinois
- The Woodlands High School, Texas
- The Woodlands College Park High School, Montgomery County, Texas

=== Other countries ===
- St Peter's Woodlands Grammar School, Adelaide, South Australia
- Woodlands House School, Srinagar, India
- The Woodlands School (Mississauga), Ontario, Canada
- Woodlands Ring Secondary School, Singapore
- Woodlands Primary School (disambiguation), several schools
- Woodlands Secondary School (disambiguation), several schools

== See also ==
- The Woodlands (disambiguation)
- Woodlands (disambiguation)
- Woodland (disambiguation)
