= Woodlands =

Woodlands may back-refer to:

- Woodland, a low-density forest

== Geography ==
=== Australia ===
- Woodlands, New South Wales
- Woodlands, Ashgrove, Queensland, a heritage-listed house associated with John Henry Pepper
- Woodlands, Marburg, Queensland, a heritage-listed house associated with Thomas Lorimer Smith
- Woodlands, Queensland, a suburb of Lockyer Valley Region
- Woodlands, Western Australia, a suburb of Perth
- Woodlands, East Maitland, New South Wales, a heritage-listed residence
- Woodlands, Newcastle, New South Wales, a heritage-listed house

=== Canada ===
- Woodlands, Calgary, a neighbourhood in Alberta, Canada
- Woodlands County, a municipal district in Alberta, Canada
- Woodlands, North Vancouver
- Woodlands, Ontario
- Woodlands, Manitoba
- Woodlands (New Westminster), a former psychiatric hospital in British Columbia
- Rural Municipality of Woodlands, a rural municipality in Manitoba

=== Ireland ===
- Woodlands railway station (Ireland)

=== New Zealand ===
- Woodlands, New Zealand, a locality within Southland District
- Woodlands, Bay of Plenty, a locality within Western Bay of Plenty District

=== Singapore ===
- Woodlands, Singapore
- Woodlands MRT station
- Woodlands North MRT station
- Woodlands South MRT station
- Woodlands Bus Interchange
- Woodlands Train Checkpoint
- Woodlands Checkpoint
- Woodlands railway station, Singapore

=== South Africa ===
- Woodlands, Durban, a suburb
- Woodlands, Johannesburg, a suburb
- Woodlands, Mitchells Plain, a suburb of Cape Town

=== United Kingdom ===
- Woodlands, Dorset, England
- Woodlands, Falkirk, Scotland
- Woodlands, Glasgow, Scotland
- Woodlands, Hampshire, England, village in Netley Marsh parish
- Woodlands, West Meon, Hampshire, hamlet in West Meon parish
- Woodlands, London
- Woodlands, Somerset, England
- Woodlands, South Yorkshire, England
- Woodlands Juvenile Justice Centre, Bangor, Northern Ireland (youth detention centre)
- Woodlands, several other United Kingdom locations

=== United States ===
- Woodlands (Gosport, Alabama), a historic house
- Woodlands, California, a census-designated place
- Barnsley Gardens, a plantation formerly known as Woodlands in Adairsville, Georgia
- Woodlands and Blythewood, Clarkesville, Georgia, a National Register of Historic Places listing in Habersham County, Georgia
- Woodlands Historic District, Lexington, Kentucky, a National Register of Historic Places listing in Fayette County, Kentucky
- Woodlands (Perryville, Maryland)
- The Woodlands (Philadelphia, Pennsylvania), a historic mansion and cemetery
- Woodlands (Bamberg, South Carolina), a historic house
- Woodlands (Columbia, South Carolina), a National Register of Historic Places listing in Richland County, South Carolina
- Woodlands (Charlottesville, Virginia), a National Register of Historic Places listing in Albemarle County, Virginia
- Woodlands, West Virginia, an unincorporated community

== Other uses ==
- Woodlands Christian Centre, Bristol, England
- Woodlands Historic Park near Melbourne Airport
- Woodland period, indigenous cultures from ca. 1000 BCE–1000 CE in the eastern part of North America

== See also ==
- Eastern Woodlands, a cultural area of indigenous North Americans
- Woodlands Academy (disambiguation)
- Woodlands Primary School (disambiguation)
- Woodland (disambiguation)
- The Woodlands (disambiguation)
- Woodlands School (disambiguation)
