= Woodland (disambiguation) =

Woodland is wooded land.

Woodland may also refer to:

== Places ==
=== United Kingdom ===
- Woodland, County Durham, England
- Woodland, Cumbria, England
- Woodland, Devon, England

=== United States ===
- Woodland, Alabama
- Woodland, California
- Woodland (Washington, D.C.), a neighborhood
- Woodland, Delaware
- Woodland, Georgia
- Woodland (Eatonton, Georgia), a National Register of Historic Places listing in Putnam County, Georgia
- Woodland (Lumber City, Georgia)
- Woodland (Lexington, Kentucky), a National Register of Historic Places listing in Fayette County, Kentucky
- Woodland (Nicholasville, Kentucky), a National Register of Historic Places listing in Jessamine County, Kentucky
- Cave City, Kentucky or Woodland
- Woodland, Illinois
- Woodland, Indiana
- Woodland, Aroostook County, Maine
- Woodland, Washington County, Maine
- Woodland, Maryland
- Woodland, Michigan
  - Woodland Township, Michigan
- Woodland, Minnesota
  - Woodland Township, Minnesota
- Woodland (Duluth), Minnesota, a neighborhood
- Woodland, Mississippi
- Woodland, Missouri
- Woodland Township, New Jersey
- Woodland, North Carolina
- Woodland, Ohio
- Woodland (St. Thomas Township, Franklin County, Pennsylvania)
- Woodland (Huntsville, Texas), a National Historic Landmark house on the campus of Sam Houston State University
- Woodland, Utah
- Woodland, Washington
- Woodland, Wisconsin, a town in Sauk County
- Woodland, Dodge County, Wisconsin, an unincorporated community

== Parks ==
- Arthur B. Ripley Desert Woodland State Park, California
- Woodland Park (Seattle), Washington
- Woodland Park Zoo in Seattle

== Camouflage patterns ==
- US Woodland, the default camouflage pattern issued to United States soldiers, marines, airmen, and sailors from 1981 until its replacement around 2006
- TAZ 90 (camouflage) or Swiss Woodland, the camouflage patterns for current standard issue Battle dress uniform of the Swiss Armed Forces

== Railway stations ==
- Woodland railway station, a station in Cumbria, England
- Woodland (MBTA station), a station in Newton, Massachusetts
- Woodland station (Pennsylvania), a historic station in West Whiteland Township, Chester County

== Other uses ==
- Whitefaced Woodland, a sheep breed
- Woodland cemetery, a type of cemetery
- Woodland period, a period of pre-Columbian Native American history
- Woodland management
- Woodland Regional High School, a high school in Beacon Falls, Connecticut
- Woodland Trust
- Woodland (album), an album by Gillian Welch and David Rawlings
- Woodland, an EP by The Paper Kites

== People with the surname ==
- Albert Woodland (1895–1955), English cricketer
- Arthur Woodland (1889–1941), English footballer
- Barry Woodland, British former Grand Prix motorcycle road racer
- Donald L. Woodland (1930–1994), Ohio state senator
- Gary Woodland (born 1984), American professional golfer
- Kendra Woodland (born 2000), Canadian ice hockey player
- Lauren Woodland (born 1977), American actress and attorney
- Luke Woodland (born 1995), footballer
- Norman Joseph Woodland (1921–2012), American co-inventor of the barcode
- Philip Charles Woodland, British engineer
- PJ Woodland (born 2005), American football player
- Rae Woodland (1922–2013), British soprano
- Rich Woodland Jr. (born 1970), American stock car racing driver
- Vincent Reynolds Woodland (1879–1933), British colonial administrator

== See also ==
- Woodlands train station (disambiguation)
- Skogskyrkogården (The Woodland Cemetery), Stockholm, Sweden
- Woodland, Maine (disambiguation)
- Woodland Beach, Michigan
- Woodland Cemetery (disambiguation)
- Woodland Corner, Wisconsin, an unincorporated community
- Woodland Heights, Pennsylvania
- Woodland Hills (disambiguation)
- Woodland Mills, Tennessee
- Woodland Park (disambiguation)
- Woodland Plantation (West Pointe a la Hache, Louisiana)
- Woodland Plantation (Church Hill, Mississippi)
- Woodland Terrace, Tampa, Florida
- Woodlands (disambiguation)
- The Woodlands (disambiguation)
