= List of educational institutions of Pietermaritzburg =

This is a list of educational institutions in Pietermaritzburg.

== Schools ==
- Alexandra High School
- Athlone Primary School
- Bisley Park Primary School
- Carter High School (South Africa)
- Clarendon Primary School
- Clifton Preparatory School
- Cordwalles Preparatory School
- Cowan House
- Epworth School
- Grace College
- Hilton College
- Heather Secondary School
- Heritage Academy
- Kharina Secondary School
- Laddsworth Primary School
- Linpark High School
- Maritzburg College
- Maritzburg Christian School
- Merchiston Preparatory School
- Michaelhouse
- Pelham Senior Primary
- Pietermaritzburg Girls' High School
- Raisethorpe Secondary School
- Ridge Junior Primary
- Scottsville School
- St. Anne's Diocesan College
- St. Charles College
- St. John's Diocesan School for Girls
- Voortrekker High School
- The Wykeham Collegiate
- Haythorne Secondary School
- Woodlands Primary School
- Forest Hill Primary School
- Woodlands Secondary School
- Russell High School

== Tertiary Institutions ==
- Durban University of Technology
- Evangelical Seminary of Southern Africa
- University of KwaZulu-Natal
- Union Bible Institute
