= Woodland Park =

Woodland Park can refer to:

Canada

- Woodland Park, Alberta, an unincorporated area
- Woodland Park, Ponoka County, Alberta, a locality in Ponoka County, Alberta
- Woodland Park, Strathcona County, a locality in Strathcona County, Alberta

United Kingdom

- Woodlands Family Theme Park, Devon, an amusement park
- Woodland Park and Pontpren, a Site of Special Scientific Interest in Glamorgan, south Wales

United States

- Woodland Park, Colorado, a city
  - Woodland Park School District
  - Woodland Park High School
- Woodland Park, Idaho
- Woodland Park, Kentucky
- Woodland Park, Lexington, Kentucky, a neighborhood
- Woodland Park, Michigan
- Woodland Park, New Jersey, a borough
  - Woodland Park School District
- Woodland Park, Columbus, Ohio, a neighborhood
- Woodland Park, Portland, Oregon, a neighborhood
  - Woodland Park Hospital, a former medical facility
- Woodland Park, Page County, Virginia, an unincorporated community
- Woodland Park, Richmond County, Virginia, an unincorporated community
- Woodland Park (Seattle), Washington, a park
  - Woodland Park Zoo
- Woodland Park, West Virginia, an unincorporated community
- Woodland Park District, Saint Paul, Minnesota
- Woodland Park Middle School, San Marcos, California
