= Woodlands Secondary School =

Woodlands Secondary School may refer to:

- Woodlands Secondary School, Luton, Bedfordshire, England, UK
- Woodlands Secondary School (Pietermaritzburg), KwaZulu-Natal, South Africa
- The Woodlands School (Mississauga), Ontario, Canada
