= The Woodlands =

The Woodlands may refer to:

== Places ==
=== United Kingdom ===
- The Woodlands, Leicestershire, a location
- The Woodlands, Holbrook, a location in Suffolk
- The Woodlands, Raydon, a location in Suffolk

=== United States ===
- The Woodlands (Philadelphia), a National Historic Landmark District in Philadelphia, which includes a mansion and a cemetery
- The Woodlands (Dover, Delaware), a festival ground located adjacent to Dover Motor Speedway
- The Woodlands, Texas

== Other uses ==
- The Woodlands (race track), dog and horse racing track in Kansas City, Kansas
- The Woodlands High School, The Woodlands, Texas
- The Woodlands School (Mississauga), a junior high and high school in Mississauga, Ontario (Toronto area)

== See also ==
- Woodland (disambiguation)
- Woodlands (disambiguation)
- Woodlands School (disambiguation)
- Woodlands style (genre of painting)
