= Msunduzi Local Municipality =

Msunduzi
- Local municipality
- Seal
- Interactive map of Msunduzi
- Coordinates: 29°37′S 30°23′E
- Country: South Africa
- Province: KwaZulu-Natal
- District: uMgungundlovu
- Seat: Pietermaritzburg
- Wards: 41

Government
  - Type: Municipal council
  - Mayor: (ANC)

Area
  - Total: 634 km^{2} (245 sq mi)

Population (2011)
  - Total: 618,536
  - Density: 976/km^{2} (2,530/sq mi)

Racial makeup (2011)
  - Black African: 81.1%
  - Coloured: 2.9%
  - Indian/Asian: 9.8%
  - White: 6.0%

First languages (2011)
  - Zulu: 72.4%
  - English: 19.0%
  - Afrikaans: 1.9%
  - Xhosa: 1.9%
  - Other: 4.8%
- Time zone: UTC+2 (SAST)
- Municipal code: KZN225

Msunduzi Municipality (Zulu: UMasipala wase Msunduzi) is a local municipality within the Umgungundlovu District Municipality, in the KwaZulu-Natal province of South Africa. It encompasses the city of Pietermaritzburg, which is the capital of KwaZulu-Natal and the main economic hub of the Umgungundlovu District Municipality.

Msunduzi Municipality is situated on the N3 highway at a junction of an industrial corridor (from Durban to Pietermaritzburg) and an agro-industrial corridor (stretching from Pietermaritzburg to Estcourt). On the regional scale, it is located at the cross section of the N3 corridor and the Greytown Road corridor to the north, a tourist route to the Drakensberg, and Kokstad Road to the south.

The city of Pietermaritzburg is a provincial and national centre of education. Pietermaritzburg is a seat of the University of KwaZulu-Natal and is home to several other institutions of higher learning. In addition, Pietermaritzburg is home to a host of private and government-owned institutions of primary and secondary education.

== Politics ==
The Msunduzi Local Municipality council consists of eighty-one members elected by mixed-member proportional representation. Forty-one councillors are elected by first-past-the-post voting in forty-one wards, while the remaining forty are chosen from party lists so that the total number of party representatives is proportional to the number of votes received.

In the election of 4 November 2026, no party won a majority. The uMkhonto weSizwe Party won the largest number of seats on the council, with 31.

The following table shows the results of the election.

Party	Ward			List			Total seats
Party	Votes	%	Seats	Votes	%	Seats	Total seats
uMkhonto weSizwe Party	77,305	38.13	23	79,438	39.13	8	31
Democratic Alliance	41,164	20.30	11	43,283	21.32	6	17
African National Congress	41,950	20.69	1	40,903	20.15	16	17
Inkatha Freedom Party	16,270	8.02	2	16,203	7.98	5	7
Independent Councillors	7,307	3.60	3	6,865	3.38	0	3
ActionSA	2,180	1.08	0	3,029	1.49	1	1
Economic Freedom Fighters	2,349	1.16	0	2,448	1.21	1	1
Independent candidates	3,019	1.49	1				1
South African Communist Party	1,366	0.67	0	1,206	0.59	1	1
Freedom Front Plus	1,139	0.56	0	1,292	0.64	1	1
Afrika Mayibuye Movement	915	0.45	0	868	0.43	1	1
26 other parties	7,781	3.84	0	7,483	3.69	0	0
Total	202,745	100.00	41	203,018	100.00	40	81
Valid votes	202,745	98.42		203,018	98.66		
Invalid/blank votes	3,261	1.58		2,753	1.34		
Total votes	206,006	100.00		205,771	100.00		
Registered voters/turnout	366,266	56.24		366,266	56.18		

=== Mayors ===
- Hloni Glenford Zondi, 2000-2006
- Zanele Hlatshwayo, 2006-2010
- Mike Tarr, May 2010 – 2011
- Chris Ndlela, 2011-2016
- Themba Njilo, 2016–August 2019
- Mzimkhulu Thebolla, August 2019 – present

== Financial mismanagement ==
By May 2023, the municipality owed Eskom R400 million for electricity services, but did not have the means to pay, and it approached national government for a bailout. By August 2023, the municipality had fallen well below the National Treasury's benchmark of at least 90 days cash-on-hand, stating that it had between 27 and 30 days availability, although opposition African Christian Democratic Party councillor Niemand Reinu stated that the municipality only had 7 days cash available. The municipality however intended to go ahead with a R27 million sponsorship to local soccer club Royal AM. The sponsorship was reported to be up for review in April 2024.

The municipality is struggling to collect revenue, with an estimated 25000 illegal electricity connections.

In September 2023, R33 million was reported missing from a pension fund for retiring employees.

In August 2025, the Pietermaritzburg High Court ruled that the sponsorship agreement with Royal AM was invalid and unlawful, and ordered Royal AM to pay back the R27 million value, plus interest.

== Housing ==
As of September 2023, Msunduzi had identified 50 problem buildings, although in the aftermath of the 2023 Johannesburg building fire, inspections are ongoing and the number is expected to grow.

== Main places ==
The 2001 census divided the municipality into the following main places:

Place	Code	Area (km^{2})	Population
Ashdown	51101	3.03	13,531
Edendale	51102	50.53	79,573
Imbali	51103	23.40	79,115
Inadi	51104	87.25	34,131
Mafunze	51105	60.55	36,186
Mpumuza	51106	97.56	55,260
Nxamalala	51108	12.94	14,417
Pietermaritzburg	51109	160.99	223,519
Sobantu	51110	1.07	8,155
Wilgerfontein	51111	0.43	1,073
Ximba	51112	5.51	2,947
Remainder of the municipality	51107	144.53	5,315
