= Rosewood Scrub Historical Society Building =

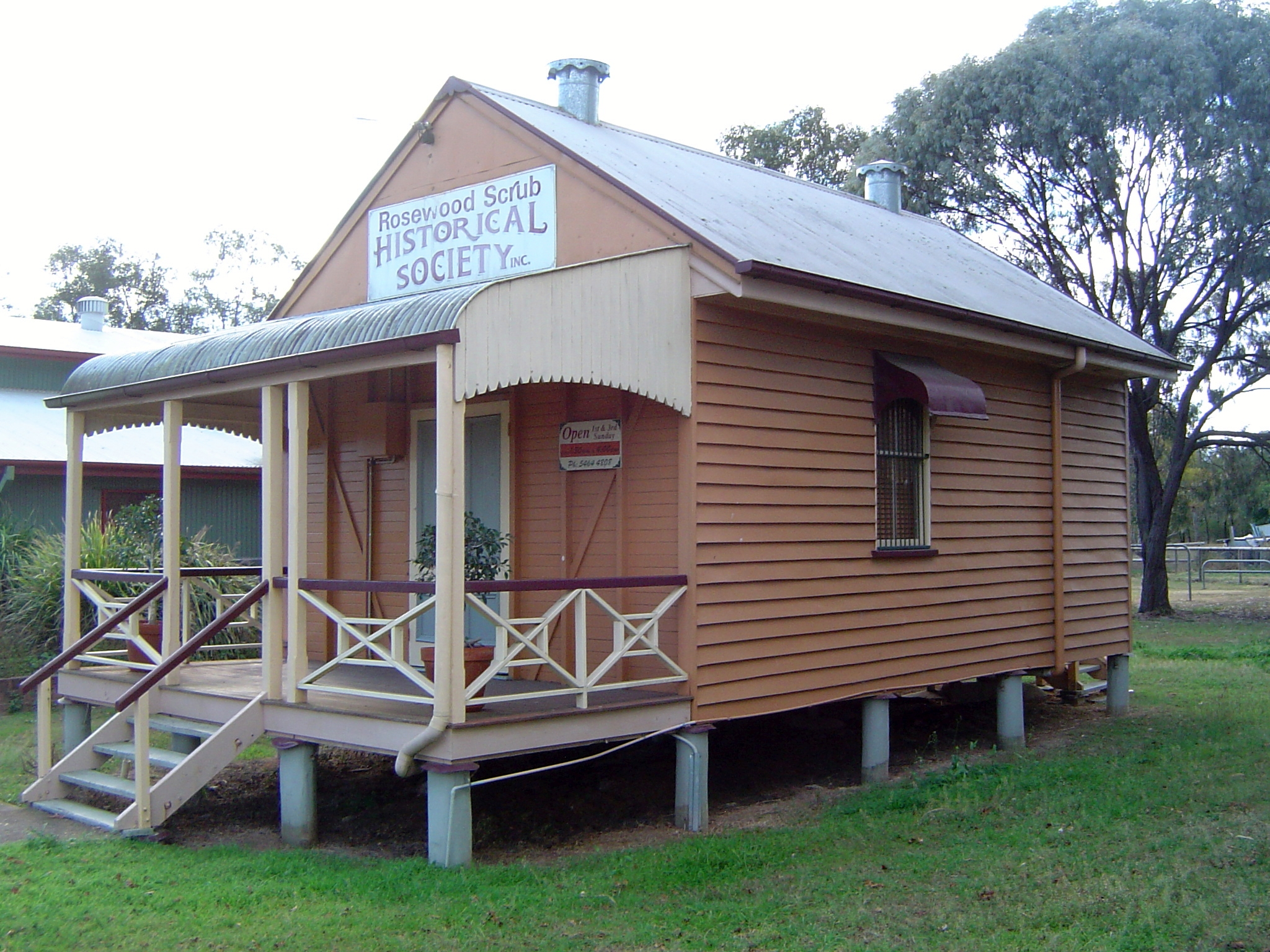
- Rosewood Historical Society building, 2014

- Location within Queensland Location within Australia
- 27.5658°S 152.5959°E
- Location: 73 Edmond Street, Marburg, City of Ipswich, Queensland, Australia

History
- Design period: 1900–1914 (early 20th century)
- Built: 1913

Queensland Heritage Register
- Official name: Rosewood Scrub Historical Society Building, Rosewood Shire Council Branch Office, Rosewood Shire Council Office, Walloon Shire Council Office & Meeting Hall
- Type: state heritage (built)
- Designated: 21 October 1992
- Reference no.: 600731
- Significant period: 1913 (fabric); 1910s–1970s (historical, social)
- Builders: Anton Jendrachowski

Rosewood Scrub Historical Society Building is a heritage-listed former shire hall at 73 Edmond Street, Marburg, City of Ipswich, Queensland, Australia. It was built in 1913 by Anton Jendrachowski. It is also known as Rosewood Shire Council Branch Office, Rosewood Shire Council Office, and Walloon Shire Council Office & Meeting Hall. It was added to the Queensland Heritage Register on 21 October 1992.

== History ==
This small timber building was erected in mid-1913 as offices and meeting place for the Walloon Shire Council.

Although the town of Walloon (on the Ipswich-Granchester railway line) was established in the 1860s, Marburg, established in the late 1870s in the centre of the Rosewood Scrub district, proved the natural administrative centre for local government. The Walloon Divisional Board, proclaimed in 1879, initially met at the Plains paddock, then at Woodlands (TL Smith's Marburg residence), and then at premises in Marburg. In 1903 the Walloon Divisional Board became the Walloon Shire Council.

In 1912 the council, whose Marburg office was considered beyond repair, petitioned the Queensland Lands Commissioner to grant part of the ungazetted Marburg water reserve for the purpose of erecting new council offices. That part of the reserve fronting Edmund Street was favoured, as it was centrally located and close to the railway terminus, which had reached Marburg late in 1911. Executive authority to reserve the site was granted early in 1913.

Tenders were called in March 1913, and the two-roomed premises were constructed the following June by Marburg contractor Anton Jendrachowski, with a contract price of £126. The main room at the front was used for council meetings and the reception of ratepayers on council business. The smaller room at the rear served as the Shire Clerk's office, storage for council documents, and a strong-room. The Walloon Shire Council met in their new premises for the first time on 7 July 1913.

The building functioned as the shire offices and meeting place of the Walloon Shire Council until early in 1917, when the Shire of Walloon Shire was abolished and divided between Rosewood Shire and Ipswich Shire (later Moreton Shire), with Marburg falling within Rosewood Shire. The last meeting of the Walloon Shire Council was conducted in the Marburg Shire Hall on 8 February 1917. Rosewood Shire Council maintained the Marburg building as a branch shire office for some time, possibly into the 1920s, during the peak of Marburg's 20th century development.

The Queensland Country Women's Association leased the building from 1932 until c. 1943, when the Marburg CWA went into recess and the building was used as the headquarters of the local War Comforts Fund. The CWA renewed their occupancy in 1946, and remained in the building into the 1970s. Concomitantly, the building has served as the meeting place for a variety of community clubs, societies and organisations, in particular the Marburg Scouts Group, and later the Marburg Progress Association. Currently, it is leased by the Rosewood Scrub Historical Society.

== Description ==
This small, single-storeyed weatherboard building with a corrugated iron gable roof, fronts Edmond Street to the south and is located adjacent to the former Queensland National Bank and First World War memorial (Marburg Community Centre and First World War Memorial).

The building has timber stumps and a verandah to the south with a single-skin exposed framed south wall with central, double entry doors. The verandah has a curved corrugated iron awning, timber posts, cross-braced balustrade and central stair.

The east and west elevations have a single sash window with a metal hood, and the north has a central timber door accessed via a timber ramp.

Also on the site is a masonry public toilet block to the southeast of the building.

== Heritage listing ==
Rosewood Scrub Historical Society Building was listed on the Queensland Heritage Register on 21 October 1992 having satisfied the following criteria.

The place is important in demonstrating the evolution or pattern of Queensland's history.

The Rosewood Scrub Historical Society Building, erected in 1913, is important in demonstrating the evolution of local government in the Marburg district, and the way in which local government functioned in a small Queensland country town in the early part of the 20th century.

The place is important because of its aesthetic significance.

It is important in exhibiting a range of aesthetic characteristics valued by the Marburg community, in particular the building's form, scale and materials, and its contribution to the streetscape of Edmond Street and to the Marburg townscape.

The place has a strong or special association with a particular community or cultural group for social, cultural or spiritual reasons.

It is part of an historic precinct in the centre of Marburg, which includes also the adjacent former Queensland National Bank and First World War memorial and the Marburg Hotel which is valued by the Marburg and district community for social and cultural reasons.
