= Marburg, Queensland =

Marburg
- Town
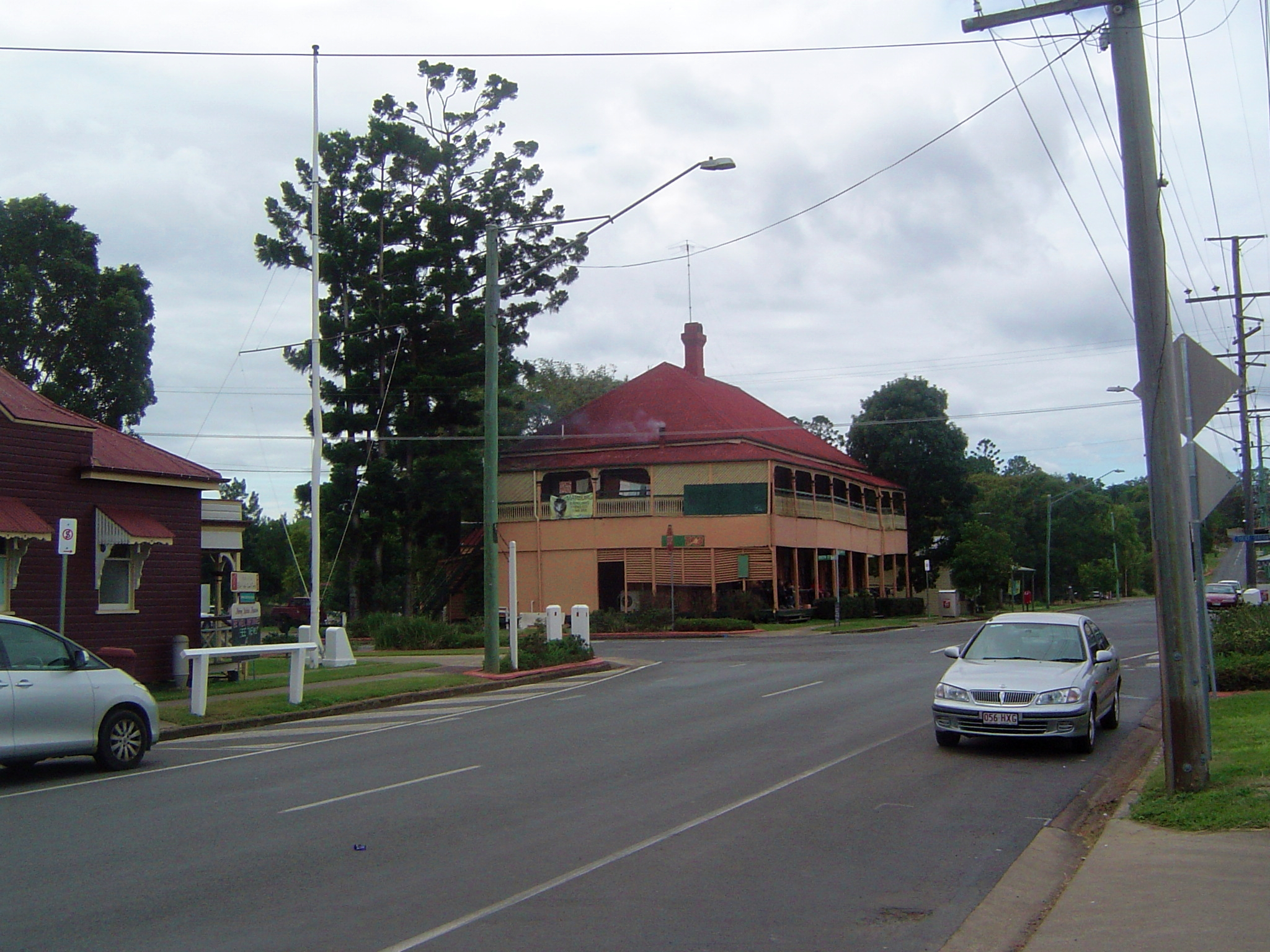
- Intersection of Edmond Street and Queen Street, Marburg, 2011

- Interactive map of Marburg
- Coordinates: 27.5672°S 152.5947°E
- Country: Australia
- State: Queensland
- LGAs: City of Ipswich; Somerset Region
- Location: 20.1 km (12.5 mi) WNW of Ipswich; 57.5 km (35.7 mi) WSW of Brisbane CBD

Government
  - State electorates: Ipswich West; Lockyer
  - Federal division: Blair

Area
  - Total: 18.1 km^{2} (7.0 sq mi)

Population
  - Total: 1,013 (2021 census)
  - Density: 55.97/km^{2} (145.0/sq mi)
- Time zone: UTC+10:00 (AEST)
- Postcode: 4346
Localities around Marburg
Coolana	Lark Hill	Haigslea
Minden	Marburg	Haigslea
Tallegalla	Tallegalla	Mount Marrow

Marburg (German: [ˈmaʁˌbʊʁk] or [ˈmaːɐ̯ˌbʊʁk], MAHR-boork), formerly known as Townshend (/tæɔn.zənd/), is a rural town in the City of Ipswich and a locality split between the City of Ipswich and the Somerset Region, both in Queensland, Australia. In the 2021 census, the locality of Marburg had a population of 1,013 people.

== Geography ==
Marburg is located approximately 50 kilometres (31 mi) west-south-west from Brisbane city. The land has an elevation of between approximately 80 and 120 metres above sea level.

A small creek, the Black Snake creek, runs through Marburg. It is named after the Red-bellied Black Snake.

Rosewood–Marburg Road enters from the south.

== History ==
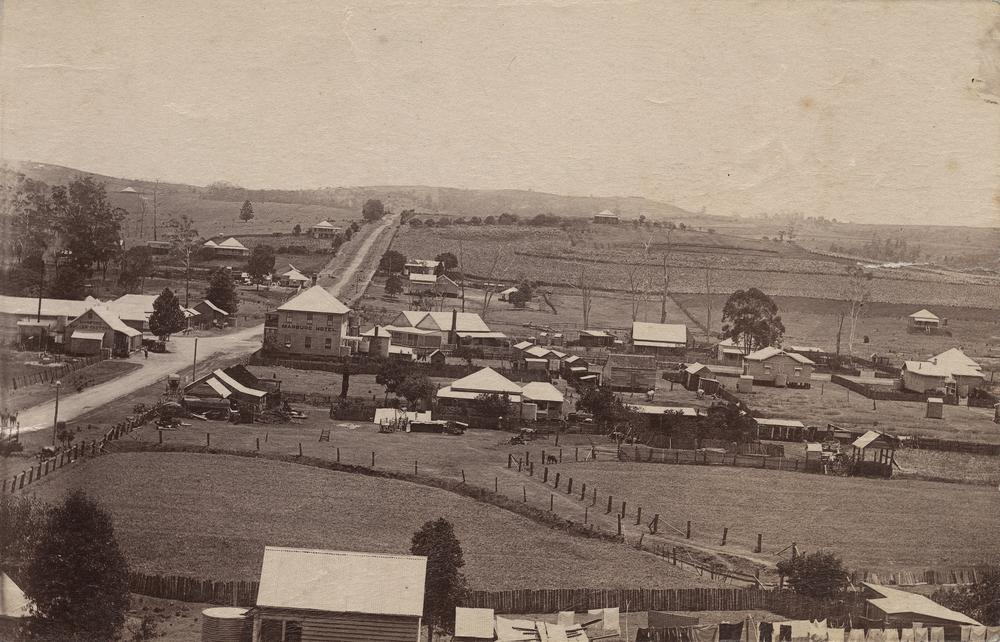
Marburg in 1908

German settlers arrived around the 1860s in the region, which is part of the land of the Indigenous Jagera people. The district was initially named Sally Owens Plains, but the town itself takes its present name from Marburg in Hesse, Germany.

The story goes that the settlers used to respond with 'ober dar' when asked where they lived. Eventually they named their settlement after the German town of Marburg, which was well known at the time.

The timber, sugar cane and dairy industries put Marburg on its feet and the town grew over time. About 46 acres, sub-divided into 200 allotments, were offered for sale by auction on 29 November 1884. Advertising included details of the clearing of the Rosewood Scrub, of close-by townships, and the future rail and telegraph services, following "the establishment of the police station". In 1900 Marburg had a courthouse, police barracks, a post office, two hotels, five churches, a State school, a School of Arts, several stores, a blacksmith, a butter factory, a sugar factory and a rum distillery. At that time nearly 80 percent of Marburg's population came from Germany or were of German descent.

Frederick State School opened on 18 March 1879. In 1888, the name was changed to Marburg State School. From 1920 to 1934, it incorporated a rural school, which taught practical skills needed for farming. In 1977, a pre-school centre was added.

Marburg Post Office opened on 1 October 1879 (a receiving office named Frederick had been open from 1878), was renamed Townshend in 1917 during World War 1 and reverted to Marburg in 1919.

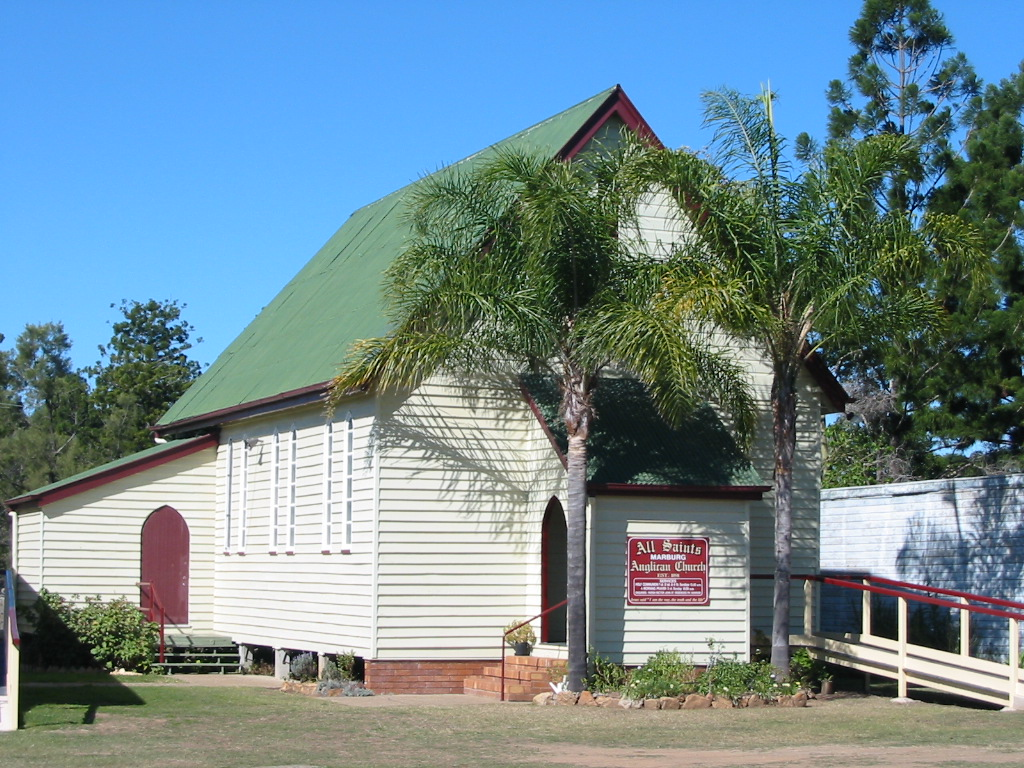
All Saints' Anglican Church, 2005

On 4 July 1891, All Saints' Anglican Church was officially dedicated by Bishop William Webber. It was built at 2-6 Seminary Road (27.5662°S 152.6117°E) adjacent to the present Warrego Highway on 2 acres (0.81 ha) of land donated by Thomas Lorimer Smith, the owner of the mansion Woodlands, also in Seminary Road. It was designed by architect George Brockwell Gill of Ipswich and built by W. Luder for £225. On Wednesday 9 November 1892, Bishop Webber returned to consecrate the church's burial ground. Not being located in the town itself led to requests to relocate the church. In 1956, land was bought in Queen Street and a church hall was built on the site, opening in February 1959, but the church remained at its original location. However, in the 1970s, the plan to make the Warrego Highway four lanes wide required the resumption of part of the church's land. The last service was held at the original location on 22 May 1977 after which it was moved onto the Queen Street site beside the hall. On 22 October 1979, the church re-opened with a service conducted by Reverend John Magee. The cemetery remains at the original site.

Marburg grew rapidly in the first half of the twentieth century, as the main road from Brisbane to Toowoomba passed through the town's centre. Marburg became popular as a stopover for travellers.

Marburg was the administrative centre for local government in the area, composing Walloon Division (1879–1903) and Shire of Walloon (1903–1917).

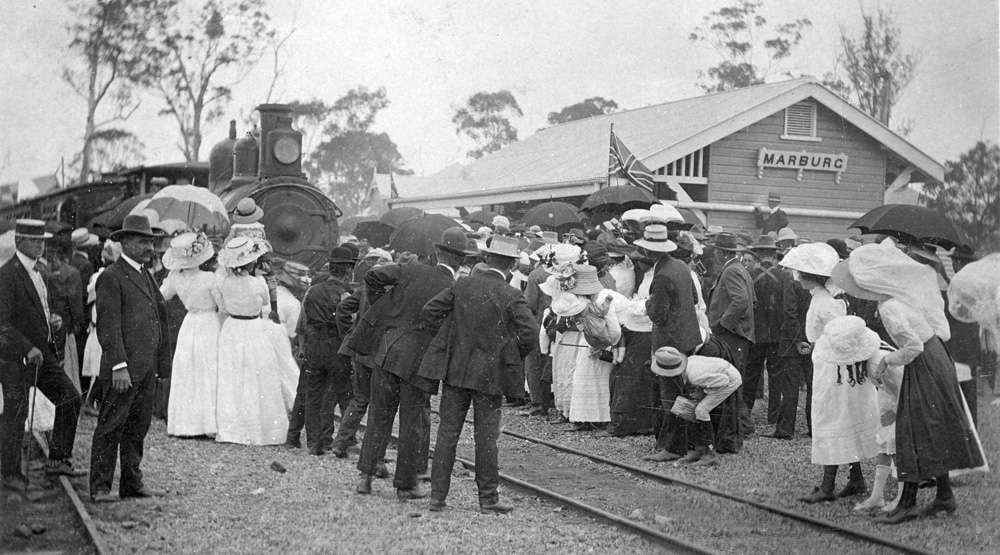
Opening of Marburg station in 1912

In 1912, the Marburg branch railway line from Rosewood to Marburg was opened but only a few years later the railway began to suffer from the competition of highway traffic. It still survived until 1965 when the line was closed. There were two stations within the locality (from north to south):

- Marburg railway station (27.5656°S 152.5944°E)
- Malabar railway station (27.5839°S 152.5900°E)

Because of an anti-German sentiment of some State politicians the name of Marburg was changed during the First World War into Townshend, a name change the locals did not support. Dr. Sirois, the local General Practician at the time, was instrumental in having the name Marburg be re-introduced after the war in 1920, which created a storm of protest but the name Marburg prevailed.

In 1971, the Warrego Highway had 1.9 miles (3.1 km) of new road built to bypass Marburg, including bridges over Queen Street and Black Snake Creek.

== Demographics ==
In the 2011 census, the locality of Marburg had a population of 567 people.

In the 2016 census, the locality of Marburg had a population of 873 people.

In the 2021 census, the locality of Marburg had a population of 1,013 people.

== Heritage listings ==
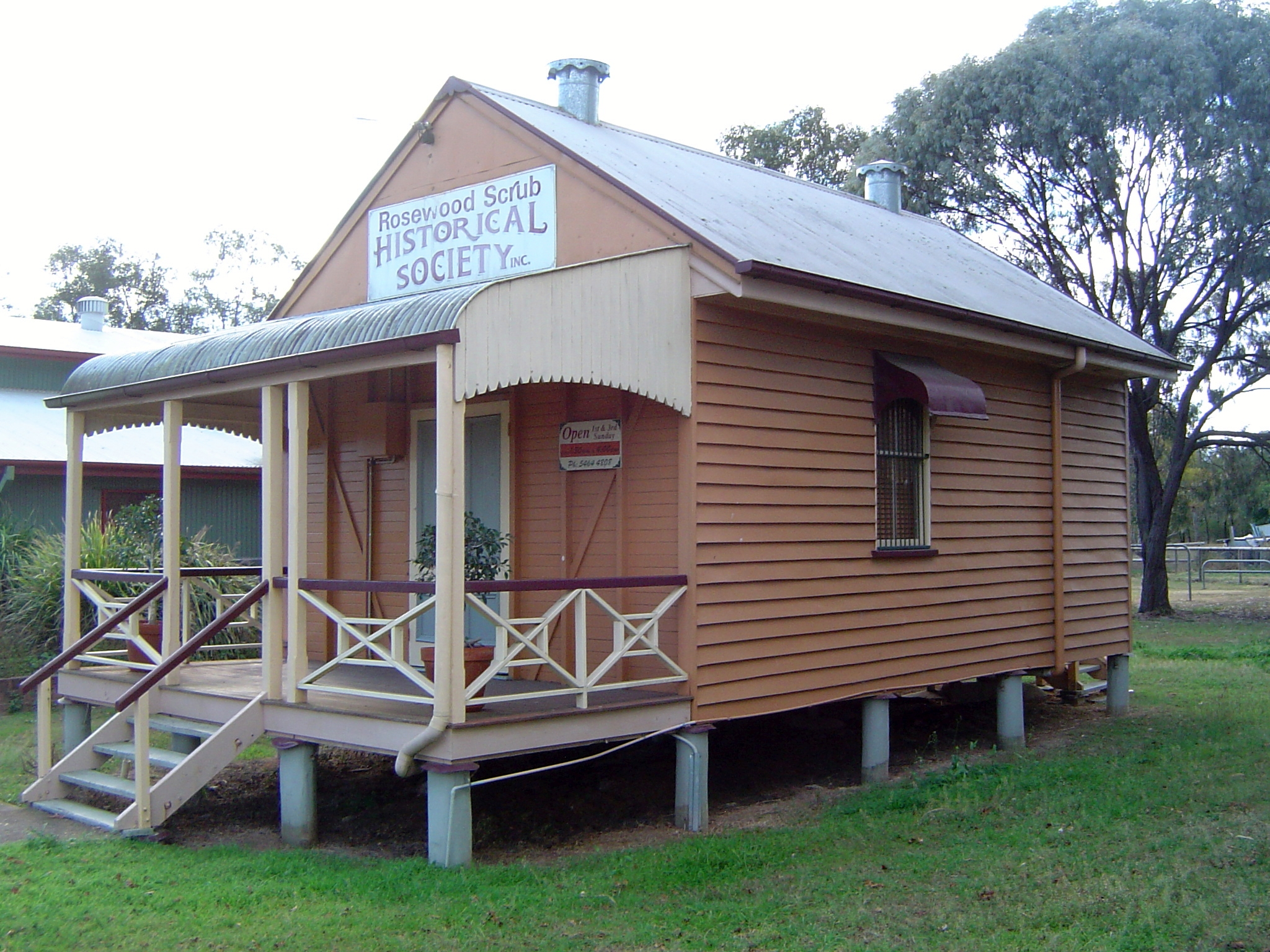
Rosewood Historical Society building, 2014

Marburg has a number of heritage-listed sites, including:

- Marburg Hotel, Edmond Street
- Marburg Community Centre and First World War Memorial, 71 Edmond Street
- Rosewood Scrub Historical Society Building, 73 Edmond Street
- Marburg State School, Louisa Street
- Woodlands, Seminary Road

== Education ==
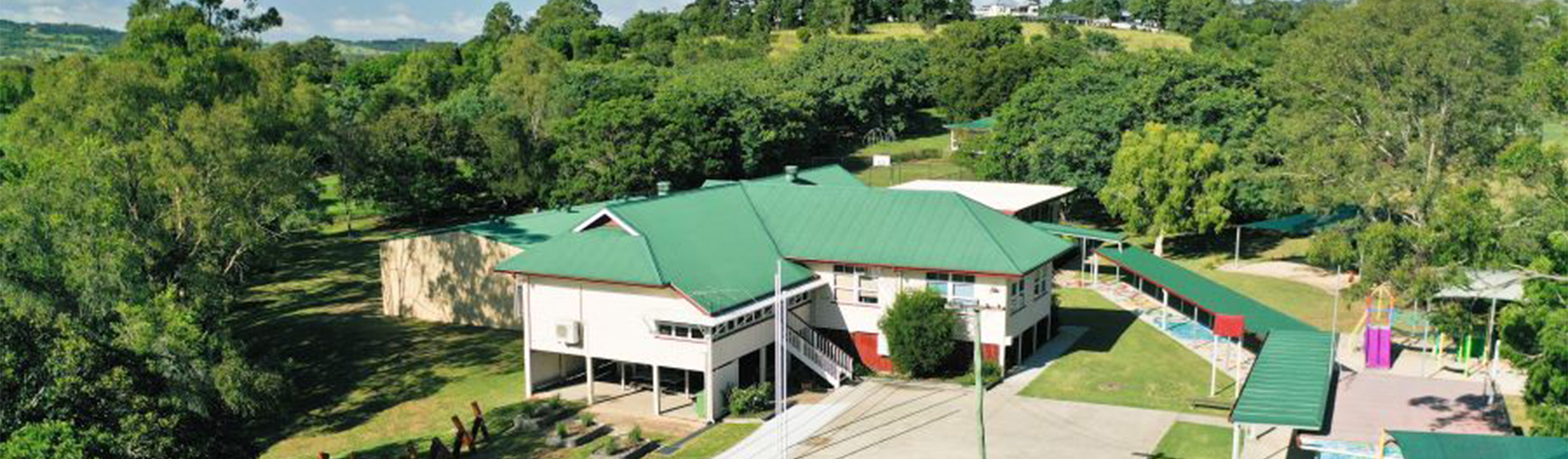
Marburg State School, 2025

Marburg State School is a government primary (Prep–6) school for boys and girls at 40–54 School Street (27.5624°S 152.5939°E). In 2017, the school had an enrolment of 52 students with 5 teachers (4 full-time equivalent) and 6 non-teaching staff (4 full-time equivalent).

The nearest government secondary schools are Rosewood State High School in Rosewood to the south and Lowood State High School in Lowood to the north.

== Amenities ==
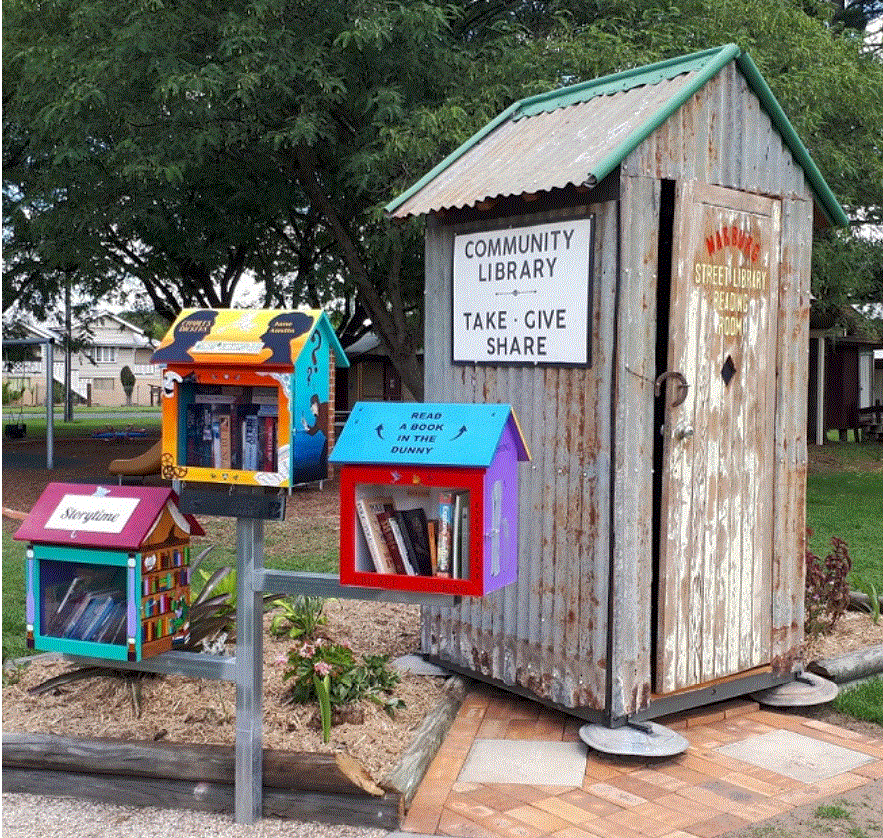
Street Library with reading room

Marburg has active community groups such as the Marburg and District Resident's Association, the Rosewood Scrub Historical Society, the Marburg Harness Racing Club, the Marburg Show Society and show grounds.

The town hosts the Marburg Fire and Rescue Station, the Marburg Rural Fire Brigade, and the Marburg branch of the State Emergency Services.

Weekly Sunday services are held at All Saints' Anglican Church at 111 Queen Street (27.5656°S 152.5966°E).

A street library was installed in the park in the centre of the town by the Marburg Residents Association. It includes a reading room in the form of a typical Australian outhouse.

== Attractions ==
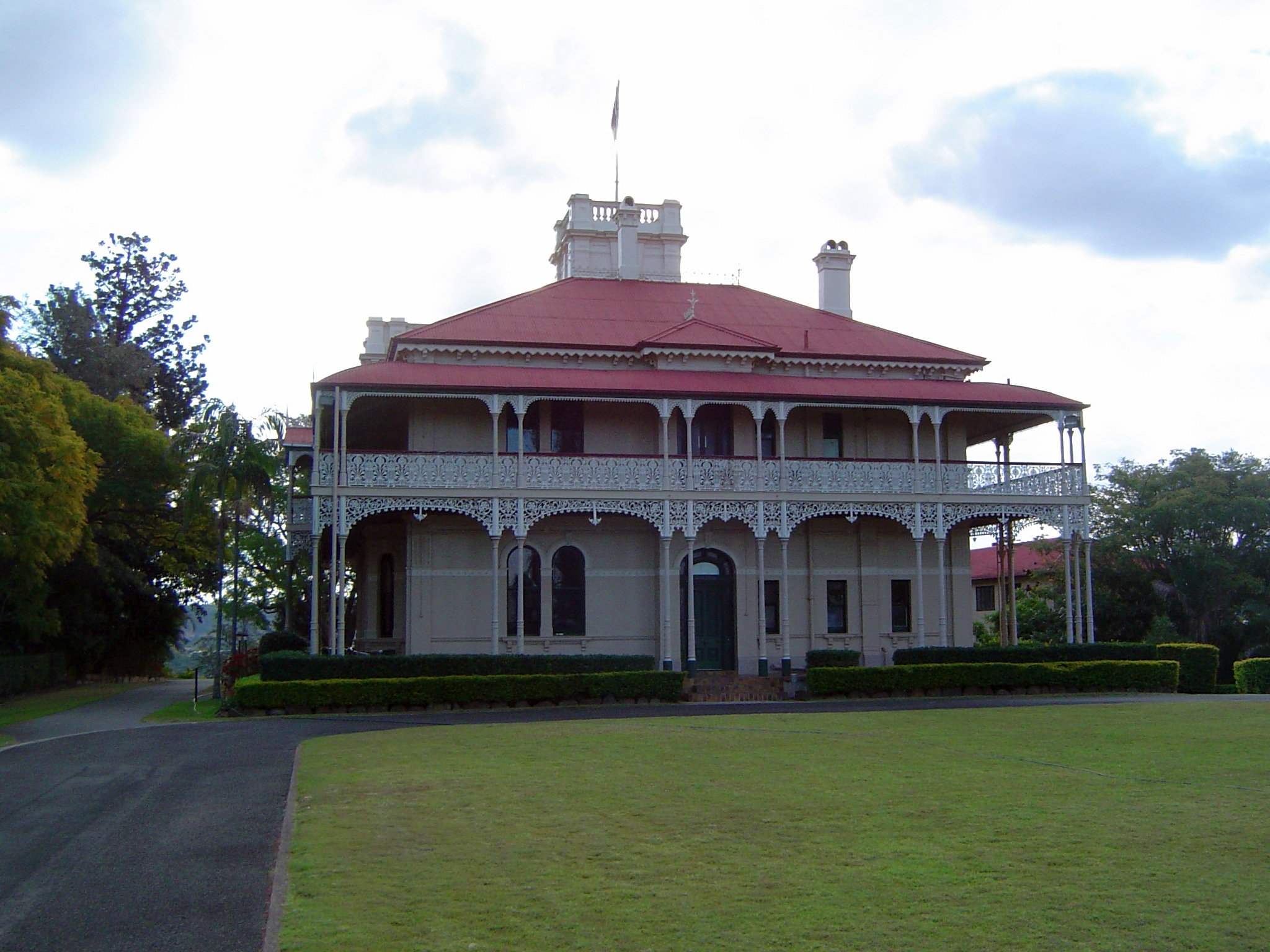
Woodlands at Marburg, 2014

'Woodlands' is Marburg's finest building. It is an example of the nineteenth century plantation owner's residence and for its historic significance in relation to the development of various primary industries in Queensland. It was built between 1888 and 1891 by Thomas Lorrimar Smith who was the owner of the sawmill, sugarmill, distillery and other business interests in the region. At present the property serves as a centre for functions such as weddings, business meetings and conferences.

== Events ==
The Marburg Black Snake Creek Festival is an annual event held in October and features musicians and other attractions.

The 'Band in the Park' is an initiative of the Marburg and District Resident's Association on the first Friday of the month at 6.30 pm.

Marburg is well known for its 'Marburg Dances' which take place every Saturday night in the hall on the show grounds.

Harness racing takes place regularly on the Marburg race course at the show grounds.
