= Vibra Healthcare =

American hospital operator

Vibra Healthcare, LLC
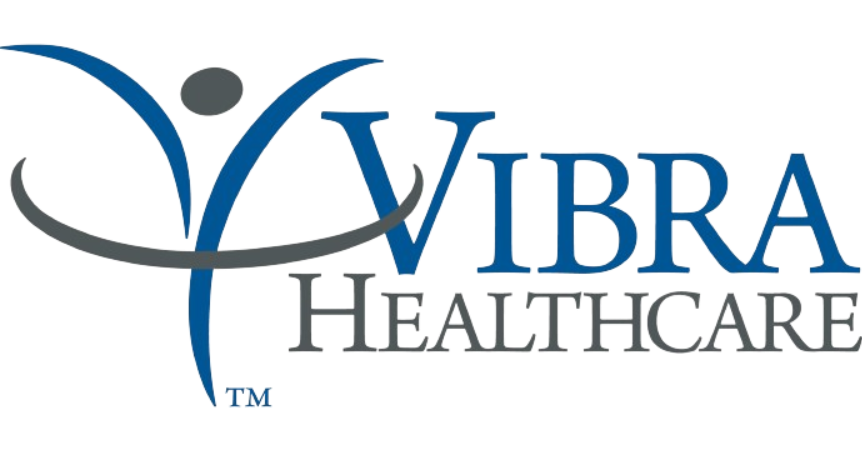
- Type: Public
- Industry: Healthcare
- Founded: 2004
- Headquarters: Mechanicsburg, Pennsylvania, United States
- Key people: CEO: Brad Hollinger
- Products: Hospitals, Rehabilitation hospitals
- Website: www.vibrahealthcare.com

Vibra Healthcare, LLC is an operator of general and rehabilitation hospitals and other healthcare facilities. It is based in Mechanicsburg, Pennsylvania and was founded in 2004. Its 65 hospitals are located in several U.S. states. Its CEO is Brad Hollinger, who also owns 10 percent of Williams Racing.

== History ==
Vibra Healthcare formed in 2004, receiving a loan of $41.4 million from Medical Properties Trust (MPT) to purchase the operations of six rehabilitation and long-term acute care hospitals (LTACHs) owned by MPT in Kentucky, Colorado, California, and New Jersey. Upon this transaction, Vibra became a tenant of MPT.

In 2006, the company's revenue was $149 million. In 2014, their revenue was $749 million.

Vibra acquired non-controlling interest in Post Acute Medical LLC in 2006.

In 2016, the company settled with the US Department of Justice for $32.7 million over claims of Medicare fraud through medically unnecessary procedures from 2006 through 2013. The company also settled with the Department of Justice in 2019 for $6.25 million over a similar issue.

During the 2020 COVID-19 pandemic, ProPublica reported the company received between $41.7 and $97 million in federally backed small business loans as part of the Paycheck Protection Program. PPP is designed for small companies and has a maximum of $10 million loan value, but Vibra received the loans split between 26 LLCs at the same address. 23 of the LLCs were funded by Orrstown Bank, and almost all were funded on the same day. Vibra also received $13 million in health care grants from CARES act and $41 million in Medicare payment advances.

== Hospitals and subsidiaries ==
As of 2006 Vibra leases ten facilities from Medical Properties Trust (MPT), a REIT; three are inpatient rehabilitation facilities (IRFs) and seven are for long-term acute care. The leases are triple-net leases. Some were purchased by Vibra, immediately sold to MPT, and leased from MPT in a leaseback arrangement.

Vibra also operates facilities that were sold under triple-net leaseback to the MedEquities Realty Trust REIT (MRT), and others that were purchased with mortgage loans from MRT. By 2015, Vibra was approximately 25% of MRT's revenue.

In 2013, Vibra purchased 17 facilities from Kindred Healthcare of Louisville, Kentucky for $183 million. The facilities included 15 hospitals with 1052 LTACH beds, one IRF with 44 beds, and one skilled nursing facility (SNF) with 135 beds.

The subsidiaries, mostly hospitals, are:

- Vibra Healthcare Corporate LLC (received $2–5 million PPP loan)
- Vibra Hospital of Boise, LLC (received $1–2 million PPP loan)
- Vibra Rehabilitation Hospital of Florence, LLC (received $1–2 million PPP loan)
- 92 Brick Road Operating Company LLC, Marlton, New Jersey (46 IRF beds, leased beginning July 2004)
- 1300 Campbell Lane Operating Company LLC, Bowling Green, Kentucky (60 IRF beds, leased beginning July 2004; received $2–5 million PPP loan)
- 7173 North Sharon Avenue Operating Company LLC, Fresno, California (62 IRF beds, leased beginning July 2004; received $2–5 million PPP loan)
- 4499 Acushnet Avenue Operating Company LLC, New Bedford, Massachusetts (90 LTACH beds, leased beginning August 2004; received $2–5 million PPP loan)
- 8451 Pearl Street Operating Company LLC, Thornton, Colorado (IRF, 117 beds, leased beginning August 2004)
- Northern California Rehabilitation Hospital, LLC, Redding, California (leased beginning June 2005 from MPT; received $2–5 million PPP loan)
- Vibra Specialty Hospital of Dallas, LLC, Dallas, Texas (60 beds, newly built and leased beginning September 2006; received $2–5 million PPP loan)
- Vibra Specialty Hospital of Portland, LLC, Portland, Oregon (leased beginning August 2006 from MPT; received $2–5 million PPP loan; closed 2026)
- Kentfield Rehab & Specialty Hospital, Kentfield, California, containing:
  - 1125 Sir Francis Drake Boulevard Operating Company LLC, Kentfield, California (60 LTACH beds, and medical office building, leased beginning July 2004; sold to MRT under leaseback for $58 million in 2014; received $5–10 million PPP loan)
  - Kentfield THCI Holding Company, LLC, Kentfield, California (leased beginning 2006 from MPT)
- Vibra Rehabilitation Hospital of Rancho, LLC, Rancho Mirage, California (IRF, newly built by Carter Validus Mission Critical REIT II, in 2016 for $27.6 million; lease signed in 2016, beginning in 2018)
- Ballard Rehabilitation Hospital, Vibra Hospital of San Bernardino LLC (received $2–5 million PPP loan)
- Kentfield San Francisco
- Southern Indiana Rehabilitation Hospital, Vibra Rehabilitation Hospital of Southern Indiana, LLC, New Albany, Indiana (60 beds, purchased in 2018 from KentuckyOne Health, received $2–5 million PPP loan)
- Vibra Hospital of Fort Wayne LLC, Fort Wayne, Indiana
- Vibra Rehabilitation Hospital of Denver, LLC, Denver, Colorado (received $1–2 million PPP loan)
- Vibra Hospital of Northwestern Indiana, Crown Point, Indiana (received $1–2 million PPP loan)
- Vibra Hospital of Amarillo, LLC, Amarillo, Texas (LTACH, formerly Kindred Hospital Amarillo, purchased in 2013 from Kindred for $25.1 million; sold to MRT in 2015 for $30 million with leaseback; received $1–2 million PPP loan)
- Vibra Rehabilitation Hospital of Amarillo, LLC, Amarillo, Texas (IRF, formerly Kindred Rehabilitation Hospital Amarillo, purchased in 2013 from Kindred for $5.8 million; received $1–2 million PPP loan)
- Post Acute Specialty Hospital of Corpus Christi, LLC, Corpus Christi, Texas (formerly Kindred Hospital – Corpus Christi, purchased in 2013 from Kindred for $500,000)
- VibraLife of El Paso LLC, El Paso, Texas (received $350,000-$1 million PPP loan)
- Vibra Rehabilitation Hospital of El Paso LLC (received $1–2 million PPP loan)
- VibraLife of Katy (104 beds, opened 2018, affiliated with Memorial Hermann, operated by Vibra; received $1–2 million PPP loan from Mid Penn Bank)
- Post Acute Specialty Hospital of Lafayette, LLC (formerly Kindred Hospital Lafayette, purchased in 2013 from Kindred for $500,000)
- Post Acute Specialty Hospital of Tulsa, LLC, Tulsa, Oklahoma (formerly Kindred Hospital Tulsa, purchased in 2013 for $8 million from Kindred)
- Vibra Hospital of Mahoning Valley (Youngstown, Ohio) (received $1–2 million PPP loan)
- Vibra Hospital of Sacramento, LLC, Sacramento, California (formerly Kindred Hospital – Sacramento, purchased in 2013 from Kindred for $37.5 million; received $2–5 million PPP loan)
- Vibra Hospital of Western Massachusetts - Central Campus, Rochdale, Massachusetts (47 beds, formerly Kindred Hospital Park View – Central Massachusetts, purchased in 2013 from Kindred for $10.1 million, CEO until 2015 was Lisa Walters-Zucco; $10 million mortgage from MRT; received $2–5 million PPP loan)
- The Meadows, Rochdale, Massachusetts (formerly Kindred Transitional Care and Rehabilitation – The Meadows, purchased in 2013 from Kindred for $1.3 million)
- Vibra Hospital of Western Massachusetts, LLC (127 beds, formerly Kindred Hospital Park View, purchased in 2013 from Kindred for $1.3 million, closed 2018, CEO was Gregory Toot)
- Vibra Hospital of Springfield, LLC, Springfield, Illinois (formerly Kindred Hospital Springfield, built in 2010 for $25 million, purchased from Kindred in 2013 for $10.1 million, closed 2019)
- Vibra Hospital of Charleston, LLC (formerly Kindred Hospital Charleston, purchased in 2013 from Kindred for $22.6 million; received $2–5 million PPP loan)
- Vibra Hospital of Central Dakotas, LLC, Mandan, North Dakota (formerly Kindred Hospital Central Dakotas, purchased in 2013 from Kindred for $7.5 million)
- Vibra Hospital of Fargo, LLC, Fargo, North Dakota (formerly Kindred Hospital Fargo, purchased in 2013 from Kindred for $23.5 million; received $1–2 million PPP loan)
- Vibra Hospital of Richmond, LLC (formerly Kindred Hospital – Richmond, purchased in 2013 from Kindred for $12 million; received $2–5 million PPP loan)
- Post Acute Medical, LLC (a VIE)
  - Post Acute Specialty Hospital of Milwaukee, LLC (formerly Kindred Hospital – Milwaukee, purchased in 2013 from Kindred for $10.5 million)
  - Warm Springs Rehabilitation Foundation, Inc., San Antonio, Texas ("WSRF", acquired December 2006)
    - San Antonio, Texas hospital, 65 IRF beds (acquired in WSRF transaction, December 2006)
    - Luling, Texas hospital, 42 LTACH beds (acquired in WSRF transaction, December 2006)
    - Post Acute Medical Specialty Hospital of Victoria, LLC, Victoria, Texas hospital (26 LTACH beds, formerly Kindred Hospital Victoria, acquired in WSRF transaction, December 2006 or 2013 for $10.2 million and closed in 2013)
- Management companies, which typically receive 2-3% of net revenue from the hospitals:
  - Vibra Management, LLC
  - Lone Star Healthcare, LLC
- Vibra Healthcare II, LLC
- Health Care REIT, Inc.
- HCRI Illinois Properties, LLC
- HCRI Massachusetts Properties Trust II
- Windrose Lafayette Properties, LLC
- Windrose Tulsa Properties, LLC
