= Marburg Hotel =

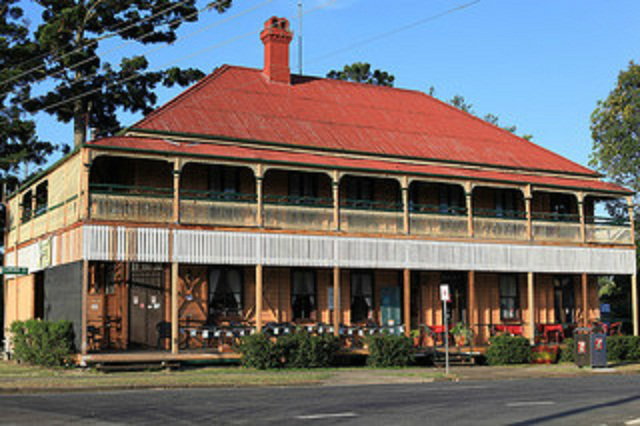
- Marburg Hotel, 2012

- Location within Queensland Location within Australia
- 27.5659°S 152.5967°E
- Location: Edmond Street, Marburg, City of Ipswich, Queensland, Australia

History
- Design period: 1870s–1890s (late 19th century)
- Built: c. 1881–c. 1890

Queensland Heritage Register
- Official name: Marburg Hotel
- Type: state heritage (built)
- Designated: 21 October 1992
- Reference no.: 600732
- Significant period: 1880s, 1890s (fabric); 1881–ongoing (social; historical use)
- Significant components: kitchen/kitchen house

Marburg Hotel is a heritage-listed hotel at Edmond Street, Marburg, City of Ipswich, Queensland, Australia. It was built from c. 1881 to c. 1890. It was added to the Queensland Heritage Register on 21 October 1992.

== History ==
The Marburg Hotel, initially single-storeyed, was erected probably early in 1881 for Marburg farmer and Walloon publican, Weigand Raabe. The 0.81 hectares (2.0 acres) site was registered in his wife's name in mid-1880; a mortgage of £180 was taken out in January 1881; and by June 1881 races and sports were being held at Weigand Raabe's Marburg Hotel. It was among the first buildings in the town, and was the first hotel.

The Marburg district was developed principally by German settlers, who in the early 1870s cleared farms from the dense Rosewood Scrub. By late 1885 the district supported a population of approximately 5,000, and the town boasted a Court House, School of Arts, primary school, two hotels and electricity supplied from TL Smith's Woodlands sawmill.

Following Weigand Raabe's death in 1883, the hotel was placed under trusteeship. In mid-1884 Auguste Raabe, his widow, renewed the hotel license, and married Otto Sakrzewski, a Marburg storekeeper and carpenter, who then held the license from mid-1885 until mid-1887. Thomas Mortimer was licensee from mid-1887 until mid-1890, at which time Sakrzewski was appointed trustee and renewed the license. Sakrzewski raised a £600 mortgage on the property in 1890, and the second storey may have been added then.

The Sakrzewski family held the license until 1921, and the freehold remained theirs until 1925, having been sold to Otto's brother, Albert, c. 1915. The hotel then passed through several owners, lessees and licensees until purchased by Queensland Brewery Ltd in 1936. It has remained Marburg's sole hotel since 1947. In 1986 the freehold was acquired by the Bowden family, who have been licensees of the Marburg Hotel since c. 1944.

The Marburg Hotel remains one of the oldest buildings in the town. It has operated continuously as a hotel since 1881, and was a highway landmark and popular stopping place for travellers from 1923 to 1969, when the Brisbane-Toowoomba highway passed through Marburg.

== Description ==
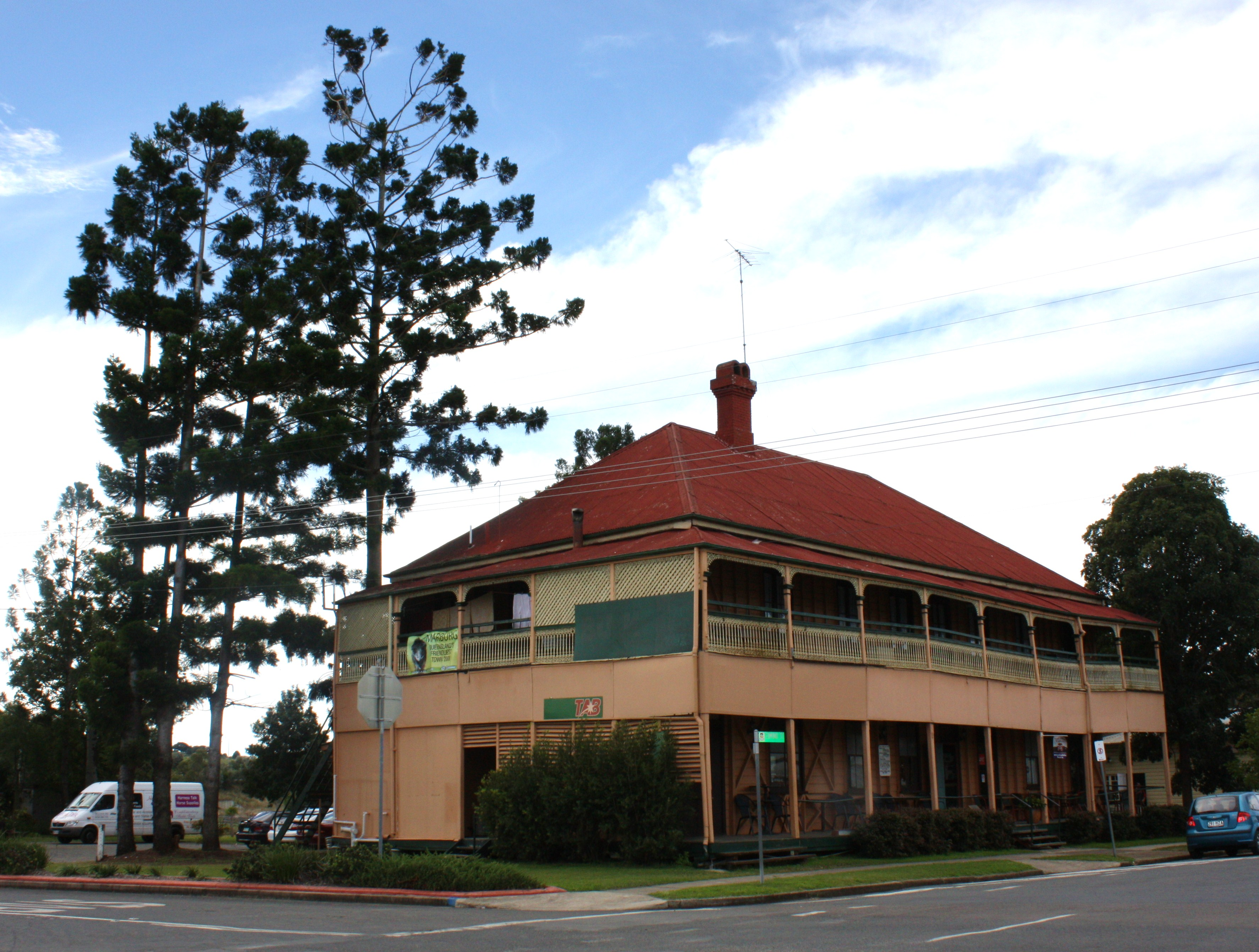
Marburg Hotel, 2009

This two-storeyed timber building, with a corrugated iron hipped roof, is located on the corner of Queen and Edmond Streets in the centre of Marburg, opposite the former Queensland National Bank and First World War memorial (now the Marburg Community Centre and First World War Memorial).

Both street facades have double-height full length verandahs which are supported by timber posts. Both street facades also have cross braced exposed timber framing, but the rear walls are clad in chamferboard.

First floor verandahs have decorative cast iron work with the verandah floor sloping outwards to a noticeable degree. The verandah roof is formed by a curved corrugated iron awning which has sagged in places along its length. Ground floor verandahs have large advertising signage in the position of the original valance. Entry to the public bar is from the verandah via the front corner door.

The building sits on timber stumps. At the rear there is a single-storeyed chamferboard kitchen house, attached to the building via a covered breezeway and open deck.

The ground floor contains hotel facilities and has been substantially altered. The first floor contains accommodation, most of which is of original plan form. Internal walls are of single skin tongue and groove board. Internal doors have fanlights above on the ground floor and fretwork panels above on the first floor. Rooms open onto the verandahs via french doors, and rooms at the rear of the building have sash windows with pressed metal window hoods.

== Heritage listing ==
Marburg Hotel was listed on the Queensland Heritage Register on 21 October 1992 having satisfied the following criteria.

The place is important in demonstrating the evolution or pattern of Queensland's history.

Marburg Hotel, erected c. 1881 with additions c. 1890. is important in demonstrating the evolution of part of Queensland's history, being associated with the emergence of Marburg as the centre of a flourishing agricultural community in the 1880s.

The place is important in demonstrating the principal characteristics of a particular class of cultural places.

It is important in demonstrating some of the principle characteristics of a late 19th century Queensland rural hotel, in the intactness of the setting, street elevations and upper floor.

The place is important because of its aesthetic significance.

It exhibits a range of aesthetic characteristics valued by the Marburg community, including the contribution through scale, form and material to the streetscapes off Queen and Edmond streets, and the landmark quality of the building, being an expression of the centre of the town.

The place has a strong or special association with a particular community or cultural group for social, cultural or spiritual reasons.

It has a strong and special association with the Marburg community, being: an integral part of Marburg social and recreational life since 1881 and part of an historic precinct in the centre of Marburg, which includes the nearby former Queensland National Bank and First World War memorial (now the Marburg Community Centre and First World War Memorial), and the former Walloon Shire Council Office (now the Rosewood Scrub Historical Society Building).
