= Marburg Community Centre and First World War Memorial =

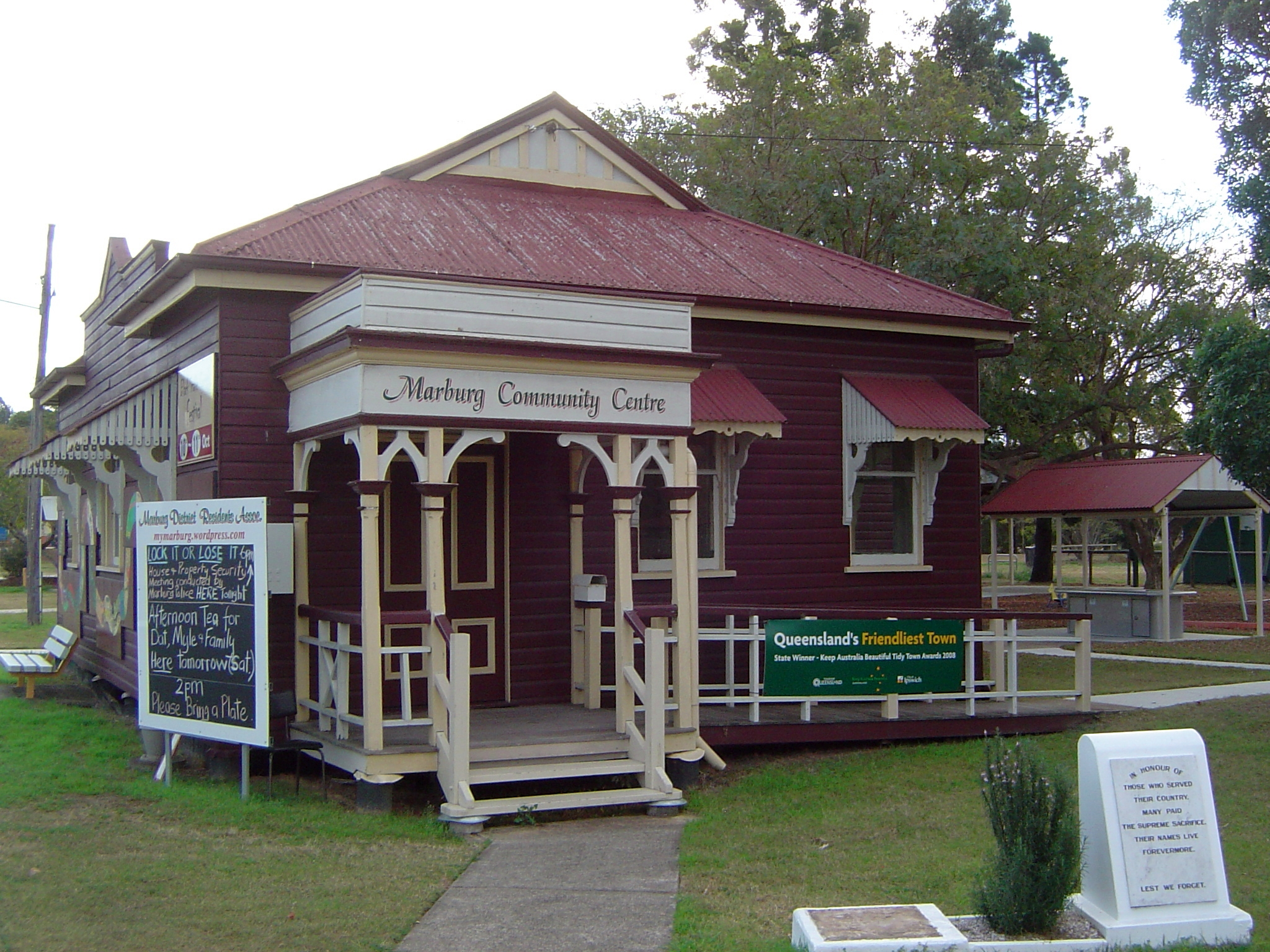
- Marburg Community Centre, 2014 (war memorial tablet in the lower right corner)

- Location within Queensland Location within Australia
- 27.5659°S 152.5961°E
- Location: 71 Edmond Street, Marburg, City of Ipswich, Queensland, Australia

History
- Design period: 1900–1914 (early 20th century)
- Built: 1912–1919

Site notes
- Architect: George Brockwell Gill

Queensland Heritage Register
- Official name: Marburg Community Centre and First World War Memorial, National Bank of Australasia, Queensland National Bank (Former)
- Type: state heritage (built)
- Designated: 21 October 1992
- Reference no.: 600733
- Significant period: 1910s (fabric); 1912–1975 (historical use as bank); 1919–ongoing (social: war memorial)
- Significant components: flagpole/flagstaff, memorial – plaque, strong room, residential accommodation – staff quarters, bank
- Builders: Hastie and Halliwell

Marburg Community Centre and First World War Memorial is a heritage-listed former bank and community centre at 71 Edmond Street, Marburg, City of Ipswich, Queensland, Australia. The bank building was designed by George Brockwell Gill and built in 1912 by Hastie and Halliwell. The war memorial was added in 1919. It is also known as National Bank of Australasia and Queensland National Bank. It was added to the Queensland Heritage Register on 21 October 1992.

== History ==
This single-storeyed timber building was erected in 1912 for the Queensland National Bank, as their Marburg branch premises.

The QNB had established a branch office at Marburg in 1887, occupying temporary accommodation in the Marburg School of Arts until construction of substantial bank premises in 1888. Following the banking crisis of 1893, the Marburg branch was closed early in 1894, and the bank premises and land were sold. In 1906 the QNB re-established a branch at Marburg, in a small timber building purchased from Weise Bros. It was the only bank in Marburg at the time.

With the extension of the railway line from Rosewood to Marburg in 1911, opening officially on 26 January 1912, confidence in the district's future increased. In August 1911 the QNB purchased the present site at the corner of Edmond and Queen Streets, near the railway terminus, and in the first half of 1912, Ipswich contractors Hastie and Halliwell erected new bank premises to a design prepared by Ipswich architect George Brockwell Gill. The building housed the banking chamber, manager's office, strongroom, bedroom for a resident banking officer, and a bathroom. A kitchen was not included, and the manager's residence was separate.

By 1912 the QNB was one of two banks in Marburg, and an agency of the Government Savings Bank was established c.1915. After 1926, however, the QNB remained Marburg's sole banking establishment.

In September 1919 a flagstaff and memorial tablet, honouring local soldiers who had served in the First World War, were erected in the front yard of the QNB premises. Large numbers of Australian troops were being repatriated at this time, and such expressions of local patriotism were not uncommon. The choice of site for the Marburg memorial emphasised the central role of the Queensland National Bank in the district, both in its physical location in the middle of town, and in its provision of a financial infrastructure to the farming community it serviced.

The Edmond St premises were occupied by the QNB until 1948 and then by the National Bank of Australasia Limited. In 1970 the Marburg branch of the NBA was closed, but the building was maintained as an agency of the Ipswich branch until 1975. In 1976 the site was sold to the Marburg & District Residents' Association Inc., who use the building as a community centre. A doctor's surgery, supplying the sole local medical service, also operates from part of the premises.

== Description ==
This single-storeyed chamferboard building, with a corrugated iron gambrel roof, is located on the corner of Queen and Edmond Streets in the centre of Marburg, opposite the Marburg Hotel and adjacent to the Rosewood Scrub Historical Society Building.

This building is L-shaped in plan, has concrete stumps with timber stumps to the perimeter, and a central parapeted section of the south wall, fronting Edmond Street. The southeast corner has a decorative timber porch with double entry doors, cross-braced balustrade, curved brackets and a parapet concealing a corrugated iron skillion awning. The western elevation has a partly enclosed verandah with timber posts, cross-braced balustrade, curved brackets and a corrugated iron skillion awning.

The building has sash windows and corrugated iron hoods with timber brackets and battens.

Internally, the building has tongue and groove boarding to walls and ceilings, moulded timber architraves and sills, a central masonry strongroom and carpeted timber floors.

A First World War Memorial, consisting of a marble plaque, and flagpole are located at the southeast corner of the site.

== Heritage listing ==
Marburg Community Centre and First World War Memorial was listed on the Queensland Heritage Register on 21 October 1992 having satisfied the following criteria.

The place is important in demonstrating the evolution or pattern of Queensland's history.

Marburg Community Centre and First World War Memorial is important in demonstrating the evolution of Queensland's history, being associated with the growth of Marburg as a rural district centre in the 1910s and 1920s.

The place demonstrates rare, uncommon or endangered aspects of Queensland's cultural heritage.

The sapling flagstaff demonstrates an uncommon aspect of Queensland's cultural heritage, being an unusual type of war memorial in Queensland.

The place is important in demonstrating the principal characteristics of a particular class of cultural places.

The building is important in demonstrating the principal characteristics of a small, rural Queensland, timber bank premises of the early 20th century, being substantially intact and retaining the original bank vault.

The place is important because of its aesthetic significance.

The place is important in demonstrating a range of aesthetic characteristics valued by the Marburg and district community, including the contribution of the building, through scale, form and material, and of the First World War Memorial, to the streetscapes of Queen and Edmond streets and to the Marburg townscape; and the decorative timber exterior joinery.

The place has a strong or special association with a particular community or cultural group for social, cultural or spiritual reasons.

The place is part of an historic precinct in the centre of Marburg, which includes also the adjacent former Walloon Shire Council Office (Rosewood Scrub Historical Society Building) and the Marburg Hotel, which is valued by the Marburg and district community for social and cultural reasons.

The place has a special association with the life or work of a particular person, group or organisation of importance in Queensland's history.

The place has a special association with the Queensland National Bank and its role in promoting the development of rural Queensland in the late 19th and early 20th centuries.
