= Woodlands train station =

Woodlands train station may refer to:

== Ireland ==
- Woodlands railway station (Ireland), a former railway station in County Cork, Ireland

== Singapore ==
- Woodlands MRT station, a Mass Rapid Transit (MRT) station near Causeway Point and the Woodlands Bus Interchange served by the North–South and Thomson–East Coast lines
- Woodlands North MRT station, an MRT station near Republic Polytechnic which serves as the northern terminus of the Thomson–East Coast line, and will be served by the Johor Bahru–Singapore Rapid Transit System when it commences operations
- Woodlands South MRT station, an MRT station underneath Woodlands Avenue 1 served by the Thomson–East Coast line
- Woodlands Train Checkpoint, a railway station and border checkpoint located close to the Malaysia–Singapore border operated by Keretapi Tanah Melayu
- Woodlands railway station, Singapore, a former railway station on the Singapore–Kranji Railway which served as the northern terminus of the railway before the opening of the Johor Bahru railway station

== See also ==
- Woodland railway station (disambiguation)
- Woodlands Park railway station, Adelaide, South Australia
