= Kyle Jones (Canadian football) =

Canadian football player (born 1986)

No. 47
- Position: Linebacker

Personal information
- Born: June 20, 1986 (age 40); Mississauga, Ontario, Canada
- Listed height: 6 ft 2 in (1.88 m)
- Listed weight: 210 lb (95 kg)

Career information
- High school: The Woodlands
- College: Bishop's
- NFL draft: 2009: undrafted

Career history
- Toronto Argonauts (2009–2010); Montreal Alouettes (2011)*; Hamilton Tiger-Cats (2011); Toronto Argonauts (2012); BC Lions (2013); Winnipeg Blue Bombers (2014); Saskatchewan Roughriders (2015)*
- * Offseason or practice squad member only

Awards and highlights
- Grey Cup champion (2012)

Career CFL statistics
- Tackles: 7
- Stats at CFL.ca (archived)

Kyle Jones (born October 4, 1986) is a Canadian former professional football linebacker. He was signed by the Toronto Argonauts as an undrafted free agent in 2009. He played CIS football for the Bishop's Gaiters after playing for the Woodlands Rams. On June 20, 2010, Jones was released by the Argonauts. He rejoined the Argonauts on August 9, 2010 when they signed him to a practice roster deal, but was released by them again on August 31, 2010. After spending the 2011 training camp with the Montreal Alouettes, Jones was signed by the Hamilton Tiger-Cats on June 27, 2011. He was later released by the Tiger-Cats on May 17, 2012 and immediately signed by the Toronto Argonauts.
