= Woodland Park, West Virginia =

Woodland Park
- Unincorporated community
- Location within the state of West Virginia Woodland Park (the United States)
- Coordinates: 39°17′25″N 81°30′43″W
- Country: United States
- State: West Virginia
- County: Wood
- Elevation: 709 ft (216 m)
- Time zone: UTC-5 (Eastern (EST))
  - Summer (DST): UTC-4 (EDT)
- GNIS ID: 1556019

Woodland Park is an unincorporated community that is located in Wood County, West Virginia, United States.
