= Woodland Park Hospital =

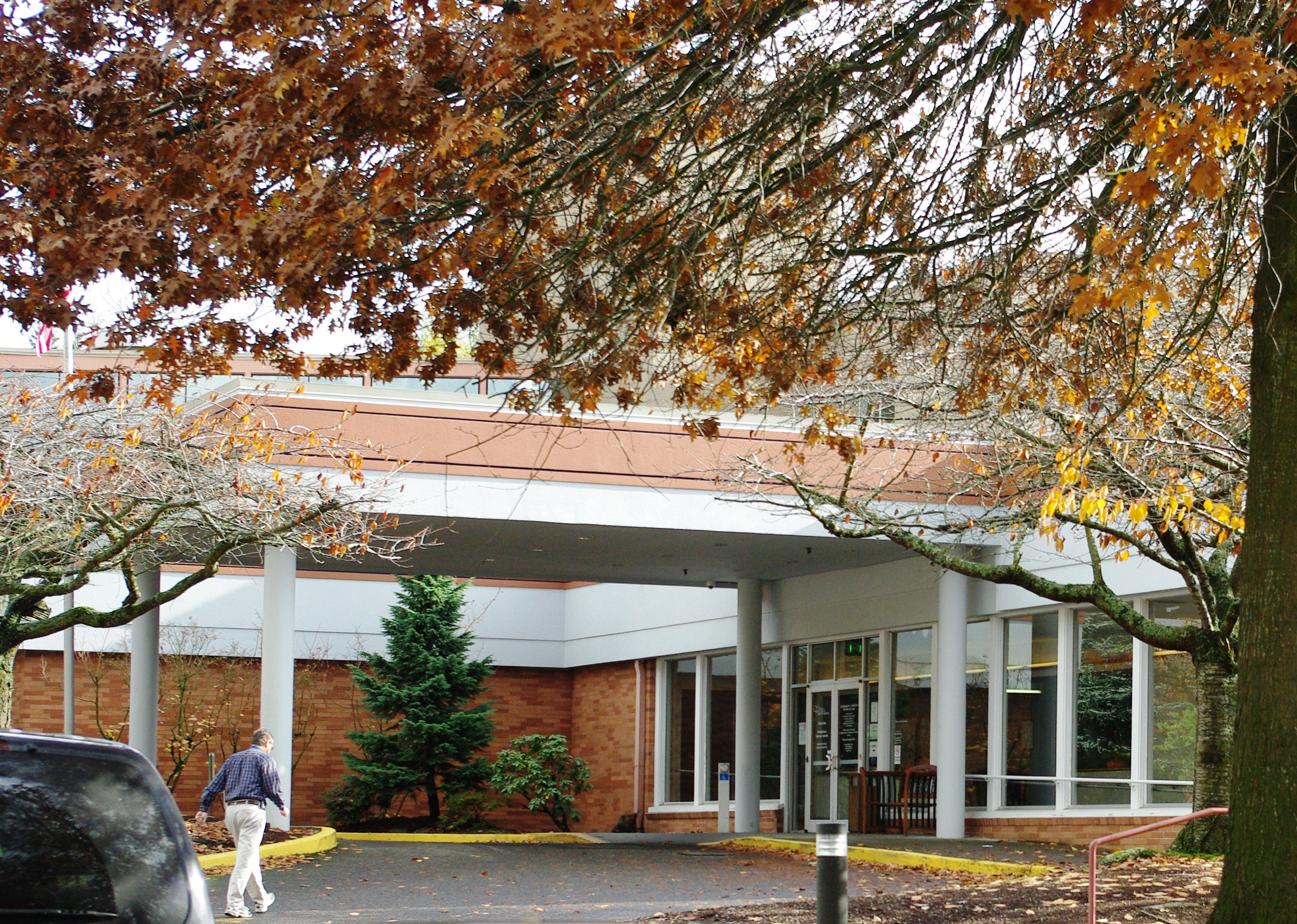
- Entrance to former Woodland Park Hospital, now Vibra Specialty Hospital

- Location within Portland, Oregon

Geography
- Location: Portland, Multnomah County, Oregon, United States
- Coordinates: 45.535724°N 122.556825°W

Organization
- Type: General

History
- Founded: 1962
- Closed: 2006

Links
- Lists: Hospitals in Oregon

Woodland Park Hospital, was a medical facility in Portland, Oregon, United States. Opened in 1962, the for profit hospital was known for its cosmetic surgery. Towards the end of its existence, the hospital received national attention when staff was forced to call 9-1-1 for a medical emergency, and the hospital then closed in 2006. From 2006 to 2025, the hospital was owned by Vibra Healthcare and was called Vibra Specialty Hospital of Portland.

== History ==
Woodland Park opened in 1962 and was owned by doctors at that time. During the 1970s, the medical facility added a large psychiatric ward. In 2002, the hospital was purchased by Symphony Healthcare along with Eastmoreland Hospital. Both hospitals then closed two years later. Woodland Park re-opened in 2005 under local ownership as Physicians' Hospital after receiving financing from the Portland Development Commission.

In July 2005, the hospital had no doctors on staff and was forced to call 9-1-1 when a medical emergency occurred. The patient was then transferred to another hospital where she died. This incident and others resulted in the hospital losing its Medicare certification. Within a year, other problems with patient care would lead to the closing of the facility on May 26, 2006. At closing, the hospital was licensed by the state to operate 200 hospital beds, but had only around 40.

In August 2006, the property was purchased by Medical Properties Trust Inc. for $17.8 million with plans for Vibra Healthcare to operate a long-term acute care medical facility at the site after renovations. That facility then announced its closure in December 2025.
