= Woodland, Maine =

Woodland is the name of multiple places in the U.S. state of Maine:

- Woodland, Aroostook County, Maine
- Woodland, Washington County, Maine
