= Woodland Park, Lexington =

Woodland Park
- Neighborhood of Lexington, Kentucky
- Interactive map of Woodland Park
- Coordinates: 38.037°N 84.489°W
- Country: United States
- State: Kentucky
- County: Fayette
- City: Lexington

Area
  - Total: .247 sq mi (0.64 km^{2})
  - Water: 0 sq mi (0.0 km^{2})

Population (2000)
  - Total: 2,622
  - Density: 10,599/sq mi (4,092/km^{2})
- Time zone: UTC-5 (Eastern (EST))
  - Summer (DST): UTC-4 (EDT)
- ZIP code: 40502, 40507, 40508
- Area code: 859

Woodland Park is a neighborhood located immediately south of downtown Lexington, Kentucky, United States. It is composed of several small neighborhood associations. The neighborhood is alternatively named Aylesford and is sometimes referred to by locals as "Chevy Chase". However, Chevy Chase is actually a separate neighborhood located southeast of Woodland Park.

The neighborhood's boundaries are Rose Street to the north, Main Street to the east, Euclid Avenue to the west, and Clay Avenue to the south.

Woodland Park long ago was the property of Mr. Irwin, son-in-law of Henry Clay, and was the site of the Agricultural College when it was established as a branch of Kentucky University in 1865. Every year the Woodland Arts Festival brings artists all over central Kentucky to share their talents for purchase. There is also Ballet Under the Stars which occurs near the gazebo.

== Neighborhood statistics ==
- Area: 0.247 square miles (0.64 km^{2})
- Population: 2,622
- Population density: 10,599 people per square mile
- Median household income: $21,286
