= Woodlands Primary School =

Woodlands Primary School is the name of several primary schools:

- Woodlands Primary School, Carnoustie, Scotland
- Woodlands Primary School, Leeds, England
- Woodlands Primary School, Pietermaritzburg, South Africa
- Woodlands Primary School, Singapore, Woodlands, Singapore
