= Voortrekker High School (Pietermaritzburg) =

School in KwaZulu-Natal, South Africa

- Cordwalles Road, Pietermaritzburg, KwaZulu-Natal; South Africa

Information
- Type: Public, Boarding
- Motto: Aanhou Wen
- Established: 1927
- Headmaster: Mr A. Immelman
- Grades: 8 - 12
- Colors: Maya blue and White
- Mascot: Juba
- Website: www.voortrekkerpmb.co.za

Voortrekker High School is a public, co-education, dual-medium (Afrikaans and English) High School situated in Cordwalles Road, Pietermaritzburg, South Africa.

Voortrekker High School was founded in 1927 and was the first Afrikaans High School in KwaZulu-Natal. From January 1992, Voortrekker was the only Afrikaans medium school in Pietermaritzburg. It is rich in tradition with high standards in academics, sport and cultural activities.

== History ==
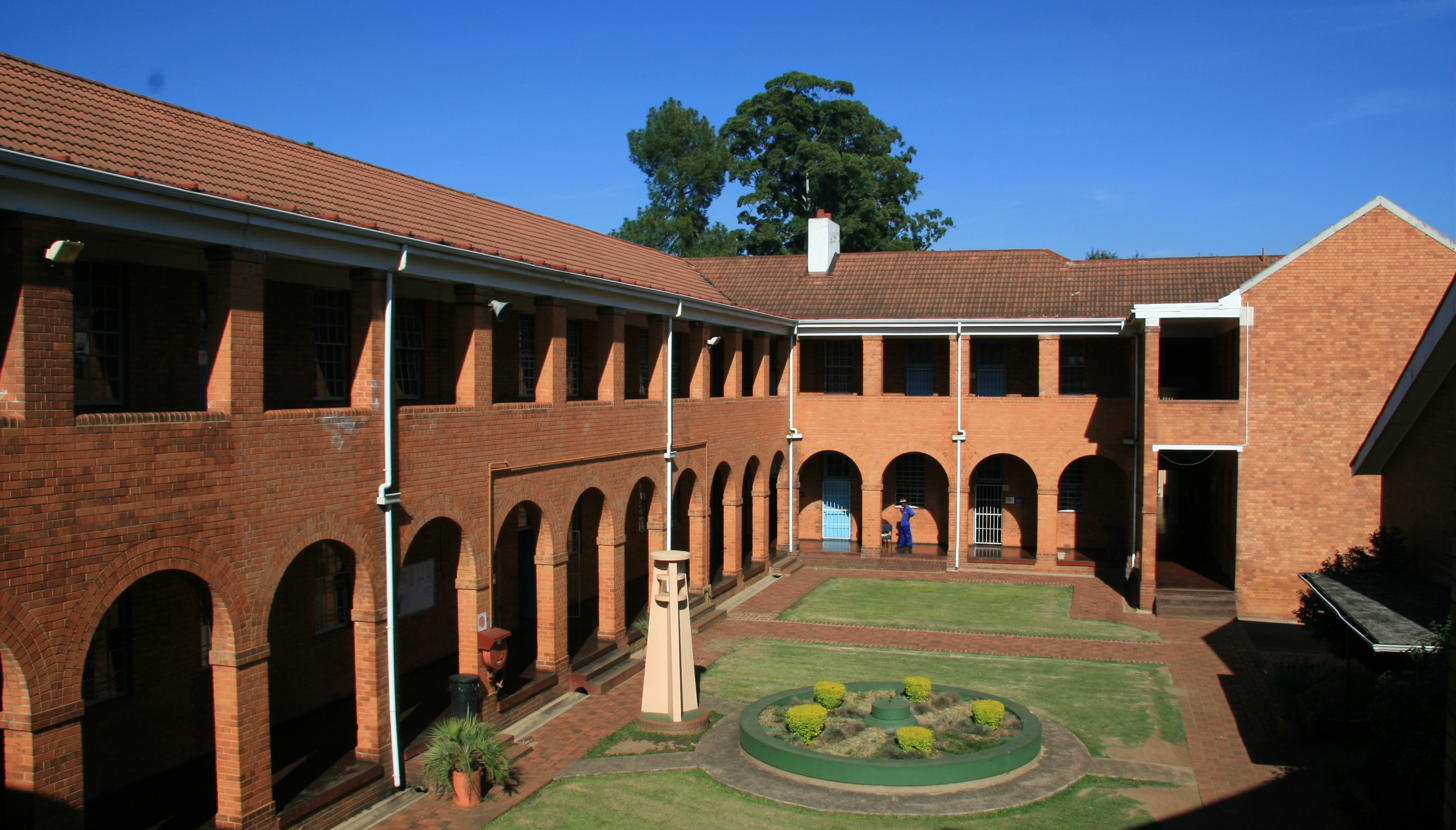
First Voortrekker School Building in Mayors Walk, Pietermaritzburg

Since the origin of the first schools in South Africa, Dutch was accepted as a formal first or second language in these schools. Afrikaans was only accepted as a language for education in 1916. The use of Afrikaans in schools was however not spontaneously accepted in the Colony of Natal which was predominantly a British Colony. Afrikaans speaking pupils in the Colony of Natal were thus only given the opportunity to be schooled in Dutch from 1916. Schooling took place on a veranda in the back yard of Longmarket Girls School in extremely poor conditions. In the subsequent years, many letters, complaints and petitions were submitted to the Department of Education.

It was only on Tuesday, 2 August 1927 that the first Intermediate Afrikaans medium school on the corner of Pine Street and Mayors Walk was completed. The school was originally named A.M.S (Afrikaans medium skool). It started with 106 Primary pupils and 7 Secondary pupils.

On 1 April 1938 A.M.S was renamed Voortrekker School whilst the first year book was printed. In 1940, Voortrekker was officially given the status of a High School and named V.H.S. (Voortrekker Hoër Skool). In 1944 the school anthem written by D.J. Opperman was selected and a fish pond in the shape of a Voortrekker wagon wheel was erected on the school premises.

On 11 October 1949, the new High School building in Cordwalles Road was officially opened. The old High School buildings were thereafter used as a Primary school and was named Voortrekker Senior Primary. In the later fifties, a Girls Hostel was added at the Cordwalles Road premises. In the sixties, a swimming pool was added. An extra building complex was added in the seventies whilst a Boys hostel was added on the premises in the eighties.

== School anthem ==
Ons kom van Bloukrans, Weenen, Bloedrivier,
Vanuit die stad en vlaktes alom hier.
Ons sluit uit alle oorde in een siel,
Soos in 'n naaf die speke van 'n wiel.

Chorus:
Op Voortrekker leer ons een slagspreuk ken:
Aanhou wen, aanhou wen, aanhou wen!

Vir elke daad waar U ons kragte verg,
Laat ons - soos 'n Retief op Drakensberg -
Eers met die hings se teuels ingetrek,
U seën vra op wat daar voor ons strek.

Chorus:
Op Voortrekker leer ons een slagspreuk ken:
Aanhou wen, aanhou wen, aanhou wen!

D.J. Opperman

== Sports ==
Rubgby Netball and Cricket are played in the school. The students also compete in the inter school games with other schools in the city.
