= Woodland Park, Richmond, Virginia =

Unincorporated community in Virginia, US

Coordinates: 37°31′10″N 77°27′40″W

Woodland Park is an unincorporated community in Richmond, in the U.S. state of Virginia.
