= Woodlands, Johannesburg =

Woodlands
- Location within Gauteng Location within South Africa
- Coordinates: 26.062°S 28.083°E
- Country: South Africa
- Province: Gauteng
- Municipality: City of Johannesburg

Area
  - Total: 1.33 km^{2} (0.51 sq mi)

Population (2001)
  - Total: 93
  - Density: 70/km^{2} (180/sq mi)

Racial makeup (2001)
  - Black African: 21.1%
  - White: 66.4%

First languages (2001)
  - English: 74.2%
  - Northern Sotho: 6.45%
  - Zulu: 6.45%
  - Tswana: 6.45%
  - Other: 6.45%
- Time zone: UTC+2 (SAST)
- PO box: 6130
- Area code: 011

Woodlands is a suburb of Johannesburg, South Africa. It is located in Region E of the City of Johannesburg Metropolitan Municipality.
