= Woodland (St. Thomas Township, Franklin County, Pennsylvania) =

Historic house in Pennsylvania, United States

- U.S. National Register of Historic Places
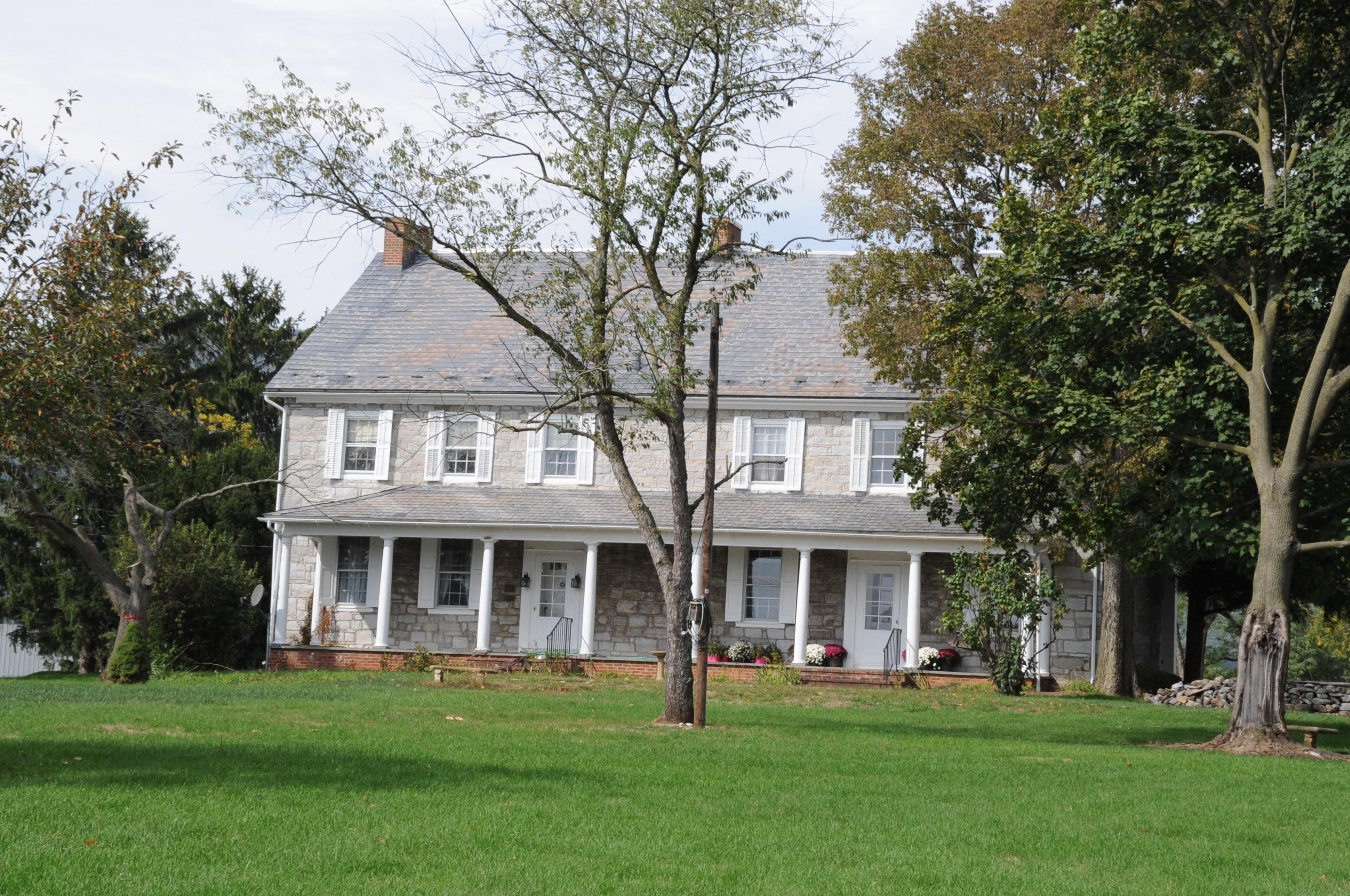

- Location within Pennsylvania Location within the United States
- Location: Southwest of St. Thomas on Pennsylvania Route 416, St. Thomas Township, Pennsylvania
- Coordinates: 39°53′38″N 77°50′12″W
- Area: 169 acres (68 ha)
- Built: c. 1760, 1790, 1907
- NRHP reference No.: 73001633
- Added to NRHP: September 20, 1973

Woodland is an historic home and farm complex that is located in St. Thomas Township in Franklin County, Pennsylvania, United States.

It was listed on the National Register of Historic Places in 1973.

== History and architectural features ==
The original section of this historic residence was built circa 1760, and is a 2 1/2-story, three-bay by two-bay, fieldstone dwelling with a gable roof. A three-bay by two-bay limestone section was added in 1790, and a 2 1/2-story rear wing was added in 1907. A two-story porch was added to the 1790 section after 1910.

Also located on the property is a contributing spring house.

This historic property was listed on the National Register of Historic Places in 1973.
