= Woodlands Academy =

Woodlands Academy may refer to:

- Woodlands Academy, Coventry, a former secondary school for boys in Coventry, England, UK
- Woodlands Academy of the Sacred Heart, a Roman Catholic school for girls in Lake Forest, Illinois, USA
