= Woodlands Academy of the Sacred Heart =

Location
- 760 E Westleigh Road; Lake Forest, Illinois 60045; United States; 42°14′0″N 87°49′43″W

Information
- Type: Private, boarding & day school
- Denomination: Roman Catholic
- Established: 1858; 168 years ago
- Principal: Rocco Gargiulo
- Head of school: Susan Tyree Dempf Ph.D.
- Grades: 9-12
- Gender: Girls
- Student to teacher ratio: 7:1
- Campus: Suburban
- Campus size: 41 acres
- Campus type: Suburban
- Houses: Barat; Duchesne; Hardey; Stuart
- Colors: Red and White
- Athletics conference: Independent School League
- Mascot: Wendy Wildcat
- Team name: Wildcats
- Accreditation: North Central Association of Colleges and Schools
- Publication: Poets & Playwrights Literary Magazine
- Yearbook: L'Espirit
- Tuition: $35,800 (Day) $60,600 (5-Day Boarding) $70,750 (7-Day Boarding)
- Affiliation: Society of the Sacred Heart
- Website: www.woodlandsacademy.org

Woodlands Academy of the Sacred Heart, founded in 1858, is a Catholic, independent, college-preparatory day and boarding school for young women in grades 9 through 12. Woodlands Academy is a member of the Network of Sacred Heart Schools, which spans 41 countries and 25 schools in the U.S. and two in Canada. Linked philosophically and technologically, the network provides educational resources and collaborative opportunities for students and faculty.

== History ==
The Convent of the Sacred Heart was established in 1858 by Mother Margaret Crawley RSCJ. In 1860 it moved to its new premises in Taylor Street and was renamed Academy of the Sacred Heart. In 1904, the Sisters moved the school to Lake Forest, Illinois, on the outskirts of Chicago. The now-defunct Barat College was founded in 1918 and the college and academy shared the large "Old Main" building. In 1961 the present name "Woodlands Academy" was adopted following a restructuring of the elementary and secondary schools. Donors later purchased the premises of the former Barat College and donated it to the academy, reuniting the campus with its roots.

== Student life ==
=== Sports ===
Woodlands competes in the Independent School League (ISL), and as a member of the Illinois High School Association (IHSA). WA sponsors volleyball, tennis, basketball, soccer, and softball as varsity sports.

=== Activities ===
- WACOR (Woodlands Academy Council of Representatives)
- Service Club
- Campus Ministry
- MathCats
- Kaleidoscope Choir
- Microscope Choir
- Orchestra
- Theater (fall play/spring musical)
- Congressional Debate Team
- Scholastic Bowl Team
- Chess Club
- Astronomy Club
- EconCats
- Robotics Club
- Classics Club
- Yearbook
- International Club
- Poets & Playwrights
- STEM Club

=== Traditions ===
Over the nearly 170 years of the school's existence, a number of secular and religious traditions have evolved, some of which are unique to Woodlands:

- Congé is a day when classes are cancelled and students spend the rest of the day having fun. It is not announced in advance.
- Sacred Heart Awards are awards given to two members of each class and a faculty member at the end of each quarter. Students submit nominations based on compassion and service.
- Goûter are snacks and other refreshments which are served on special occasions, or as a surprise to students and staff.
- Wildcat of the Week Award is given to students who show the most school spirit. The winner is decided by the student council.
- Prize Day is held at the end of the school year to honor academic achievement.
- May Crowning is a traditional Catholic ceremony which honors Mary, by crowning a statue of her with a wreath of flowers. Students and faculty choose the participants.
- A Ring Ceremony is held every Spring. Juniors are given their school rings by members of the senior class.
- Lambs at the Crib is a Christmas tradition involving the school's crèche scene. Each student is assigned a figurine of a lamb to place by the scene, and moves it closer to the manger as students complete projects or good works.
- Feast of Mater Admirabilis is an October religious celebration which honors Mary, and the sophomore class.
- Mass of the Holy Spirit and Flag Ceremony is a celebration of the school's diversity. The celebration begins with a procession of students and staff with foreign or dual citizenship carrying the flags of their homelands into the Chapel of the Sacred Heart. The flags are displayed in the school's Flag Hallway for the remainder of the year.
- Feast of Saint Rose Philippine Duchesne is celebrated each year to honor the saint who brought the message of Sacred Heart education from France to North America in 1818.

== Notable alumnae ==
- Mary Callahan Erdoes, 1985, banking executive at J.P. Morgan Chase
- Susan Saint James is an actress best known for her work on television (McMillan & Wife, Kate & Allie).
- Jenny Sanford is the former first lady of South Carolina.

== See also ==
- Barat College
