= Linpark High School =

Linpark high school
- LINZERA

Location
- Pietermaritzburg, KwaZulu-Natal; South Africa; 29.602211°S 30.315887°E

Information
- Type: Boarding School
- Motto: "EVERY LEARNER IS THE ARCHITECT OF THEIR FUTURE"
- Established: 1954
- Headmaster: Mr A Mangalparsad
- Grades: 8–12
- Houses: 4
- Colours: Blue, White & Red
- Athletics: ESTERHEUIZEN
- Nickname: "EHOZI"

Linpark High School is a South African co-educational public boarding school situated on Claude Forsyth Rd, in Boughton, a northern suburb of Pietermaritzburg, KwaZulu-Natal.

The school's curriculum has a technical bias, with courses in subjects such as motor mechanics and electronics in addition to more traditional subjects such as maths and science.

Although it has boarding facilities, most students are day pupils, living locally.

Originally an all-white school, the first black pupils were admitted in 1991.
