= Arthur Woodland =

English footballer (1895–1979)

Personal information
- Full name: Arthur Woodland
- Date of birth: 3 August 1889
- Place of birth: Liverpool, England
- Date of death: 1941 (aged 51–52)
- Position: Wing half

Senior career*
Years	Team	Apps	(Gls)
1908–1909	St Polycarp's		
1909–1910	Kirkdale		
1911–1912	Zingari		
1912–1913	St Helens Town		
1912–1919	Norwich City		
1919–1922	Notts County	48	(1)
1922–1923	Southend United	31	(1)
1923–1924	Pontypridd		
1924	Leamington Town		
Total		79	(2)
- * Club domestic league appearances and goals

Arthur Woodland (2 December 1895–1979) was an English footballer who played in the Football League for Notts County and Southend United.
