= Woodlands, Marburg =

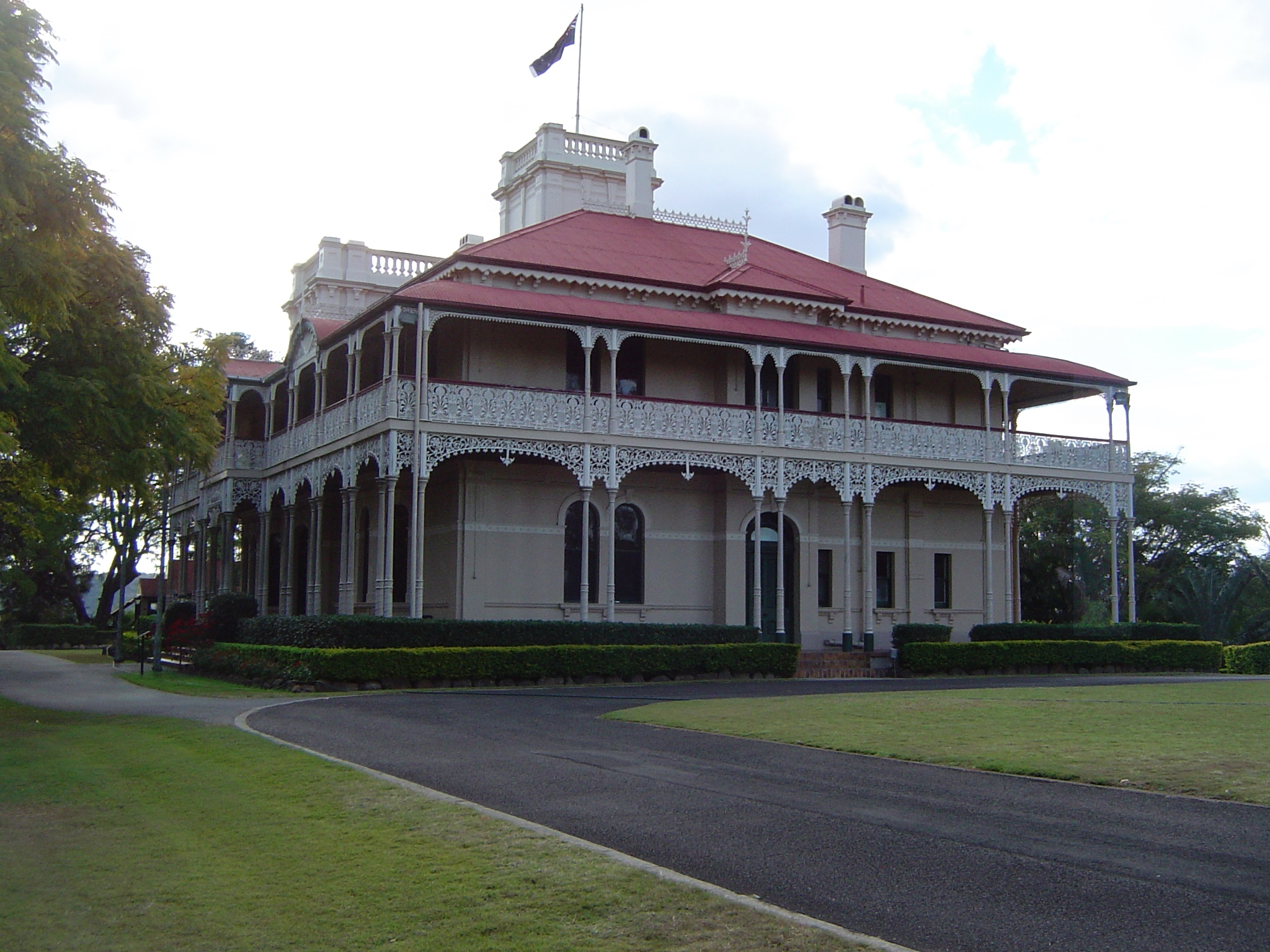
- Woodlands, 2014

- Location within Queensland Location within Australia
- 27.5555°S 152.6048°E
- Location: Seminary Road, Marburg, City of Ipswich, Queensland, Australia

History
- Design period: 1870s–1890s (late 19th century)
- Built: 1889–1940s
- Built for: Thomas Lorimer Smith

Site notes
- Architect: George Brockwell Gill

Queensland Heritage Register
- Official name: Woodlands, Marburg Campus, Ipswich Grammar School, St Vincent's Seminary
- Type: state heritage (landscape, built, archaeological)
- Designated: 21 October 1992
- Reference no.: 600734
- Significant period: 1880s–1940s (fabric); 1880s–1980s (historical)
- Significant components: driveway, lookout /observation deck, grotto, shed/s, burial site, cellar, views to, garden/grounds, lawn/s, tower – observation/lookout, strong room, trees/plantings, dormitory, tank – water, decorative finishes, scullery, residential accommodation – main house, classroom/classroom block/teaching area, steps/stairway, views from, chapel

Woodlands is a heritage-listed mansion at Seminary Road, Marburg, City of Ipswich, Queensland, Australia. It was designed by George Brockwell Gill and built from 1889 to 1940s. It is also known as Marburg Campus, Ipswich Grammar School and St Vincent's Seminary. It was added to the Queensland Heritage Register on 21 October 1992.

== History ==
Woodlands is a two-storeyed brick residence and was erected in 1889–91 for Thomas Lorimer Smith, saw miller, timber merchant, contractor, sugarcane grower, sugar mill proprietor, and active member of the Marburg community. It was designed by Ipswich architect George Brockwell Gill.

Thomas had married Mary Stuart in 1881, and at Woodlands they raised a large family. Their first residence was a modest, single-storeyed timber house near the saw mill. In the late 1880s they commissioned Ipswich builder/architect Samuel Shenton to design an imposing two- storeyed brick residence, to be erected on the hill above the Woodlands mills.

The Smith family established themselves in the Rosewood-Marburg district in the 1860s/early 1870s. Thomas' father, Charles, had arrived in Queensland from England in 1862, and in 1864 was joined by his wife and family. He established a saw mill at Sandy Creek, Walloon, on the outskirts of the Rosewood Scrub, in 1865, and c. 1866 took his eldest son, Thomas Lorimer Smith, into his saw milling business. Charles Smith was among the first to select land in the Rosewood Scrub, taking up about 1000 acres c. 1870. This included 568 acres (portion 392, parish of Walloon) selected in September 1870, on part of which Woodlands mansion was erected 20 years later. In 1876 TL Smith entered into partnership with his father, and together they erected a new and larger saw mill on portion 392, close to the then emerging township of Marburg, in the heart of the Rosewood Scrub. The Marbug saw mill opened early in 1877. In the same year Charles retired, leaving the running of the mill to his son. The mill was destroyed by fire early in 1880, but was rebuilt within a few months.

Charles Smith died in December 1880, his interest in the Marburg saw mill and land passing to his son Thomas. TL Smith named the property Woodlands, expanded the saw mill – adding a joinery plant – and in the early 1880s, as the district converted to agriculture, moved into sugar cultivation and manufacture. The first sugarcane was planted c. 1881, a sugar mill was erected next to the saw mill in 1882, and the first crushing and sugar manufacture took place in 1883. TL Smith invested heavily in the sugar mill, erecting a sugar refinery in 1884, an electric light system in 1885 (illuminating the mills, offices, stables, and his private residence), a telephone line between the Marburg mills and Walloon (the nearest telegraph station) in 1885 and a large rum distillery near the mills in 1886. In 1888 he installed more powerful machinery in the sugar mills and distillery, and laid steel tramways on the Woodlands estate to transport sugar cane and other produce to the mills. By 1889, TL Smith's sugar mill and distillery were considered the most powerful and by far the most modern, in Southern Queensland. In March 1889, giving evidence before the Royal Commission into the Queensland Sugar Industry, TL Smith stated that he was employing 36 South Sea Islanders at Woodlands, which comprised about 1200 acres, with 250 acres under cane. He claimed to have invested between £20,000 and £25,000 in the sugar mill, distillery, planting, fencing, and tramway. In the late 1880s, Smith also began to plant grapes on the Woodlands estate, intending to expand into the production of wines and brandies.

In the 1880s and 1890s, TL Smith was the most influential landowner and employer in the Marburg district, and was actively involved in the progress of Marburg township (established early 1870s) and community. He was appointed a Justice of the Peace in 1884, and in 1885 erected the Marburg School of Arts, for which he supplied electric power from his saw mill for the opening celebrations. He also negotiated with the Edison Electric Light Company to supply power to several buildings in the township. He was a member of the Marburg School of Arts Committee, and in 1890 was appointed to the Church of England building committee, having donated an acre of land on the Marburg-Kirchheim Road for the erection of an Anglican church in the Rosewood Scrub. In the 1890s he encouraged the expansion of the local sugar industry, agreeing to purchase cane from other farmers in the Marburg district.

Shenton had established himself in Ipswich by 1851 as a carpenter, builder and contractor, and was advertising as an architect and builder by 1874. He had been involved in local politics since 1863, and served as Mayor of Ipswich in 1871–72 and in 1889. From 1886 talented young London architect George Brockwell Gill was employed in Shenton's office, and took over the architectural practice when Shenton retired in 1889. It is understood that Woodlands was designed by Gill, rather than Shenton, whose designs prior to being joined by Gill had been modest and pragmatic in style. The Smith family later attributed the design to Gill, whose other notable works included Brynhyfryd (1889–90) at Blackstone (demolished), Ipswich Girls' Grammar School (1890–91) and Ipswich Technical College (1898–1900).

Tenders for the construction of a mansion at Marburg for TL Smith were called by Shenton in January–February 1889. Construction took over 2 years to complete, the Smiths moving into their new home in July 1891. The bricks were made locally, likely on the property (as with brick-lined dams constructed near the sugar mill in 1883). Red cedar used in the panelling in the dining and drawing rooms reputedly came from Wivenhoe in the Brisbane River Valley and was milled at Woodlands. Cabinet maker and joiner Joseph Klee is understood to have worked on the timber panelling for over a year.

In the 1890s, economic depression, falling sugar prices, unreliable rainfall, and government encouragement to dairy farmers, led to a decline in sugar cultivation in the Marburg district. TL Smith took out a substantial mortgage on his property in 1897, and in January 1906 the Woodlands Estate was subdivided and put up for sale by order of his mortgagees. At this time the estate comprised 29 improved scrub farms, a large sugar mill (to be sold with farm no.22), 1¾ miles of sugar tramway, 38 iron cane trucks, distillery, saw mill, milking herd, numerous small sheds, 12 small cottages and Woodlands Homestead, offered on about 7 acres with an orchard of fruit trees and olives. Several of the farms sold at this time, but the Smith family retained Woodlands residence and much surrounding land. The sugar mill was purchased by Marburg Sugar Co., the chief shareholders of which were Gibson Bros of Bingera, Bundaberg, but the era of the small mill was over - Marburg farmers were no longer keen to grow sugarcane, and the Marburg Sugar Mill closed c. 1919.

In 1925 TL Smith, still resident at Woodlands, was interviewed by the Brisbane press and a description of the house published:

On the crest of an isolated hill the "lookout tower" rises some 50ft above the ground level, giving a beautiful view of the surrounding country. The house is of two stories, built of brick, covered with a cement coating. Doors and windows, of massive design to conform with the spacious rooms, are all of beautifully grained red cedar cut in the Brisbane Valley. Above the top story are two brick 10,000 gallon tanks, which receive all the water from the roof, and from these tanks the water is reticulated through the house, and provides flushing for a septic system. The house took four years to complete, most of the bricks being made in the vicinity. At present the area held is about 300 acres. . . . .

Thomas Lorimer Smith died in 1931. Woodlands was retained by the Smith family for over a decade, until transferred in 1944 to the Corporation of the Roman Catholic Archdiocese of Brisbane, along with nearly 130 acres of the Woodlands estate. Archbishop Duhig had purchased the property in the hope of encouraging missionaries of the Society of the Divine Word, evacuated from New Guinea to Brisbane in May 1944, to stay in Queensland.

The Society was founded in 1875 in Steyl, the Netherlands, and had established a base elsewhere in Australia early in the 20th century to provide support for its missionaries in New Guinea. The Divine Word missionaries accepted Duhig's offer, and at Woodlands established the first mission seminary in Queensland. The main residence was renovated, two timber-framed buildings were erected in the grounds for use as classrooms and dormitories, and the place opened as St Vincent's Seminary in 1945. In 1954 title to the property was transferred from the Catholic Church to The Society of the Divine Word.

By 1986 the main building, then containing 8 bedrooms, 2 servants' bedrooms, sitting and dining rooms with full height cedar wall panelling, large sandstone cellar, and 8 fireplaces, remained largely in its original form. The grounds by this time included a 25-metre (82 ft) in-ground pool, two additional dormitory buildings, a chapel, and a small cemetery associated with St Vincent's Seminary, and in which 18 persons had been interred, including Dr Eucharist Sirois and his wife, who ran a private hospital in Marburg during the 1910s and 1920s. In 1986 St Vincent's Seminary closed and the property was sold to the Ipswich Grammar School, which uses the property for weekend activities, seminars, and conferences. In 2002, the school sold the property to a local family, who operate it as a function centre and boutique holiday accommodation.

== Description ==
Woodlands is a large, ornate, rendered brick building with two main levels surrounded by verandahs, plus cellar, observation deck and tower.

The roof comprises two hips, separated by a masonry balustraded tower section. A curved roof is set down on four sides over open verandahs, with cast-iron paired columns, valance, and upper level balustrade. The main roof eaves, decorated with zigzag fascia, project a small hip into the verandah roof over central doorways on the east and west.

The southern elevation has a double-storey portico, aligned with the central masonry section, bearing the name Woodlands and the year 1868. (The date refers to the year Charles Smith first took up land in the Rosewood district, not the date of construction of the house.) Either side are two semi-circular pedimented frontis pieces. All have elaborately decorated crests, finials and bargeboards. A large bay window projects either side. This elevation, designed as a front entrance, stands close to steep terracing, overlooking secluded grotto areas. It opens into a vestibule some 2.4 metres (7 ft 10 in) wide, with early mosaic tiled floor. The building, however, is entered from the east, where the driveway encircles an expanse of lawn. This elevation is less formal with arched windows to the front dining room, and rectangular windows to service areas. External joinery to windows and doors is painted. The ground level verandah is concrete floored, and unlined above.

Internally, a hallway about 1.5 metres (4 ft 11 in) wide runs east to west. Doors are four panelled with sidelights and semi-circular fanlights, of varying pattern and colour.

Ground floor dining rooms and sitting room have plaster ceilings with elaborate circular surrounds to central lights. Doors are cedar panelled with rectangular fan lights over. Deep cornices and pelmets are of moulded cedar. The front dining room has walls of full height cedar, with 4-inch (100 mm) beaded vertical boarding above the panelling to dado height. The fireplace is dark grey marble. The sitting room has full height cedar panelling and a white marble fireplace. The formal dining room opposite has rendered walls with deep cedar skirting. The fireplace is painted. The adjoining office has an angled fireplace sheeted over. This room leads into a vaulted strong room in the northwest corner, rendered, with metal vent grilles.

The kitchen is a large square room with recent ceramic tile floor and fittings c. 1960s. Storerooms with rendered walls and tiled floors lead off under a wide-arched opening. The scullery in the northeast corner is of painted brickwork and hardboard ceiling, with recent mosaic tiled floors. The WC, between scullery and eastern entrance, has rendered walls.

There are stairs leading up at the eastern end of the hall, and adjacent to the vestibule. Balustrades are of turned cedar with monumental and elaborate newel posts. The underside of the eastern stair is painted boarding. That adjacent to the vestibule, of cedar panelling.

The upper level contains ten bedrooms, some of original dimensions, some divided by hardboard partitions, reusing in places, original panelled doors. Original walls are rendered, several with cornices and light surrounds matching the ground level rooms. The fireplace in the southwest bedroom is painted. The adjoining small bedroom is an exception, having window joinery painted internally. A sitting area above the ground level vestibule has a corrugated iron ceiling and moulded cornice. The door, and sashes to floor level, leading on to the southern verandah, are not early. Earlier glazed panels are in place above. The eastern door from hallway to verandah is of timber and glazed panels, with twin-paned fanlight of yellow patterned glass, and side lights of blue, above green bubble glass. The verandah is floored with 4-inch (100 mm) shot edged boarding. The roof is unlined.

Central to this upper floor, a narrow winding stair, leading to the tower, has painted turned balusters and moulded rail. The tower overlooks, through arched openings, hipped roofs either side. Leading out to the masonry balustraded areas over the water tanks, are doors with semi-circular fan lights, boarded on the north, one panelled on the south.

From the ground floor, a stair with turned cedar balusters descends to the cellar. Cellar walls are of rough sandstone with arched openings headed in cross-bracing in spaces between 12-inch (300 mm) joists. Along the eastern wall are low timber platforms.

Woodlands is a notably grand residence in a rural setting, overlooking open country to distant hills. It is associated with a picturesque hillside graveyard; large secluded grotto; olive grove and other plantings including bunya pines (Araucaria bidwillii); and disused dairy buildings. There are three other buildings in the grounds, formerly associated with St Vincent's seminary: now Bougainvillaea House, Poinciana House and Jacaranda House.

== Heritage listing ==
Woodlands was listed on the Queensland Heritage Register on 21 October 1992 having satisfied the following criteria.

The place is important in demonstrating the evolution or pattern of Queensland's history.

Woodlands is important in demonstrating the pattern of Queensland's history, being associated with early non-indigenous settlement of the Rosewood Scrub and the development of the Marburg district as a sugar-producing region in the late 19th century.

The place demonstrates rare, uncommon or endangered aspects of Queensland's cultural heritage.

It is a substantial town mansion erected in a rural setting in Queensland, reflecting a way of life to which its builder, a successful entrepreneur of working-class background, aspired.

The place is important in demonstrating the principal characteristics of a particular class of cultural places.

The place survives remarkably intact, and is important in demonstrating the principal characteristics of a grand, two-storeyed brick residence with wide, ornate verandahs, observation tower, sandstone cellar, early water reticulation system, and set in substantial grounds [which include an olive grove, other significant plantings including bunya pines (Araucaria bidwillii), and disused dairy buildings], and with fine vistas over rural surroundings.

The place is important because of its aesthetic significance.

The place has aesthetic significance, generated by the formal design, the use of rendered brick and stone, the large public rooms and fine joinery work and cedar panelling internally, the decorative verandahs with cast-iron posts, balustrading and valances, the garden setting [which includes a picturesque hillside graveyard and a large, secluded grotto], and the prominent ridge-top location. The place has landmark value from the main Ipswich–Toowoomba Road.

The place has a special association with the life or work of a particular person, group or organisation of importance in Queensland's history.

The house is an excellent example of the "grand scale" domestic work of Ipswich architect George Brockwell Gill, and has a special association with saw-miller, timber merchant and sugar-mill proprietor Thomas Lorimer Smith and his family. As St Vincent's Seminary, the place has a special association with the work of the Society of the Divine Word in Queensland from 1945 to 1986. Two substantial timber-framed dormitory/classroom buildings and a later chapel (now kitchen-dining room) in the grounds are significant for their association with St Vincent's Seminary.

== See also ==
- Woodlands, Ashgrove, another Queensland historic register-listed house, also near Brisbane
