= Woodlands Secondary School (Pietermaritzburg) =

Secondary school in South Africa

Coordinates: 29.5659°S 30.3943°E

Location
- 99 Mysore Rd; Northdale, Pietermaritzburg, KwaZulu-Natal; South Africa

Information
- Established: 1902; 124 years ago
- Enrollment: 1,060 (2012)
- Website: www.woodlandssec.co.za

Woodlands Secondary School is a secondary school in Northdale, Pietermaritzburg, KwaZulu-Natal, South Africa.

== History ==
The school was established in 1902 with 74 students.

By 2012, the school had 1,060 pupils.
