= Woodlands Primary School, Pietermaritzburg =

Primary school in Pietermaritzburg, South Africa

Woodlands Primary School is a primary school in Pietermaritzburg, KwaZulu-Natal province, South Africa.
