= The Woodlands School (Mississauga) =

Public school in Mississauga, Ontario, Canada

Coordinates: 43.562497°N 79.64817°W

Location
- 3225 Erindale Station Road; Mississauga, Ontario, L5C 1Y5; Canada

Information
- School type: Elementary & Secondary School
- Founded: 1969
- School board: Peel District School Board
- Superintendent: Janet Jackowski
- Area trustee: LeeAnn Cole
- Principal: Janice Lewis
- Grades: 7-12 and Co-op (post-grade 12)
- Enrolment: 1209 (May 4th, 2022)
- Language: English
- Colours: Red and gold
- Mascot: Rammy the Ram
- Team name: The Woodlands Rams
- Special programs - Gifted: Regional Enhanced Program
- Website: www.thewoodlandsschool.com

The Woodlands School is a public elementary and secondary school in Mississauga, Ontario, under the Peel District School Board. It has a diverse student population, with large numbers of students of South and East Asian backgrounds. The school has an English as a Second Language (ESL) program to assist new immigrants, and a Peer Assisted Learning (PALS) program. The school is also a Regional Enhanced Learning Centre for the secondary program.

== History ==
The Woodlands School was opened in the year 1969. While the first phase of its present building was under construction, classes operated within Springfield Public School building. In September 1970, the students and staff moved to the new building, and The Woodlands became a combined elementary and secondary school.

The facility received a major renovation throughout 2016. This renovation implemented a new open concept design to the front of the school, and also removed the old library building attached to the school, replacing it with a new elementary classroom wing. An elevator was later built near the front of the school.

== Notable alumni ==
- Angela Bailey - Canadian Olympic track and field athlete
- Darcy Brown - CFL player
- Morgan Campbell - Sportswriter, memoirist
- Kyle Jones - Plays for the Toronto Argonauts of the Canadian Football League
- Dontae Richards-Kwok - Canadian sprinter
- Cam Stewart - Media/radio personality for The Score
- Sven Spengemann - MP for Mississauga-Lakeshore
- Kat Teasdale - Professional auto racing driver
- Janet Leung - Canadian Olympic women's softball player

== See also ==
- Education in Ontario
- List of secondary schools in Ontario
