= Ferrari Estates Building =

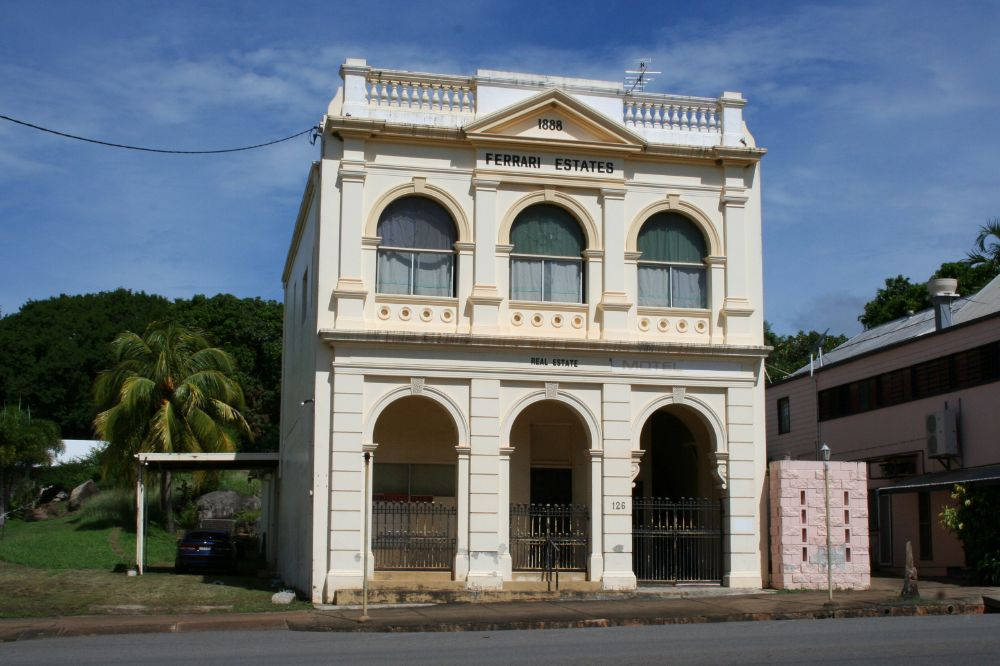
- Ferrari Estates Building, 2010

- Location within Queensland Location within Australia
- 15.4667°S 145.25°E
- Location: 126 Charlotte Street, Cooktown, Shire of Cook, Queensland, Australia

History
- Design period: 1870s–1890s (late 19th century)
- Built: 1890–1891

Site notes
- Architect: Eyre & Munro
- Architectural style: Classicism

Queensland Heritage Register
- Official name: Ferrari Estates Building, Bank of North Queensland
- Type: state heritage (built)
- Designated: 21 October 1992
- Reference no.: 600422
- Significant period: 1890s (fabric); 1891–1908 (historical use)
- Significant components: strong room, carriage/wagon/dray entrance, residential accommodation – manager's house/quarters, gate – entrance
- Builders: John Armstrong

Ferrari Estates Building is a heritage-listed former bank building at 126 Charlotte Street, Cooktown, Shire of Cook, Queensland, Australia. It was designed by Eyre & Munro and built from 1890 to 1891 by John Armstrong. It is also known as Bank of North Queensland. It was added to the Queensland Heritage Register on 21 October 1992.

== History ==
This two-storeyed brick building was erected in 1890–91 as the banking premises and manager's residence for the Cooktown branch of the Bank of North Queensland.

Established in Townsville in July 1888, the Bank of North Queensland, was one of only three 19th-century indigenous Queensland banks, the other two being the Queensland National Bank, established 1872, and the Royal Bank of Queensland, established 1885. Actively supported by Robert Philp, politician, businessman and separationist, formation of the Bank of North Queensland was allied closely to the separation movement, and promoted as a source of North Queensland development capital free from southern (i.e. Queensland National Bank) influences. Within 6 months, the new bank had established 7 branches, including Cooktown, which opened on 1 September 1888. The Brisbane branch was opened in November 1888, and the bank's headquarters transferred there from Townsville in 1894. Several of the smaller North Queensland branches closed during the 1890s, but by 1900 additional branches had been established at Childers, Mareeba, Mount Morgan, Thornborough and Thursday Island, reflecting the shifting fortunes of North Queensland industries (mining, pastoralism, and the beche-de-mer trade).

When the Cooktown branch was established in 1888, alluvial goldmining on the Palmer River gold fields was still paying high dividends, the Annan River tinfields had just been opened, and the local beche-de-mer industry was booming. Cooktown, which serviced a district population of approximately 30,000, was thriving, and both the Bank of New South Wales and the Queensland National Bank had opened branches there already. Such was local business confidence in the future of far North Queensland, that within two years the Bank of North Queensland had commissioned Townsville architects Eyre & Munro to design substantial new premises for the Cooktown branch. Title to the Charlotte Street site was acquired by the bank in June 1890, tenders were called in August–September, and the contract was let to John Armstrong of Cooktown, with a price of £2,188. Work on the site excavation had begun by mid-September, and the foundation was laid on 13 October 1890 by Mr AJ Charker, manager of the bank's Cooktown branch.

The two-storeyed brick building was one of Cooktown's more substantial buildings. The ground floor contained the banking chamber, manager's room and strong room. A private entrance at the side of the building led to the manager's residence, which comprised entrance hall and dining room on the ground floor, and drawing room, 3 bedrooms, bathroom and linen press on the upper level. The bedrooms opened onto the side balcony. The single-storeyed kitchen wing beyond the dining room contained kitchen, servant's room and store., with high ceilings and plenty of windows to ensure adequate ventilation in a tropical climate. The whole was constructed of brick, initially supplied from Mrs Savage's brickyard at the "Two-mile" just outside Cooktown. Difficulties in their manufacture and heavy rain during February delayed work on the bank building, and it was finally completed in mid-1891.

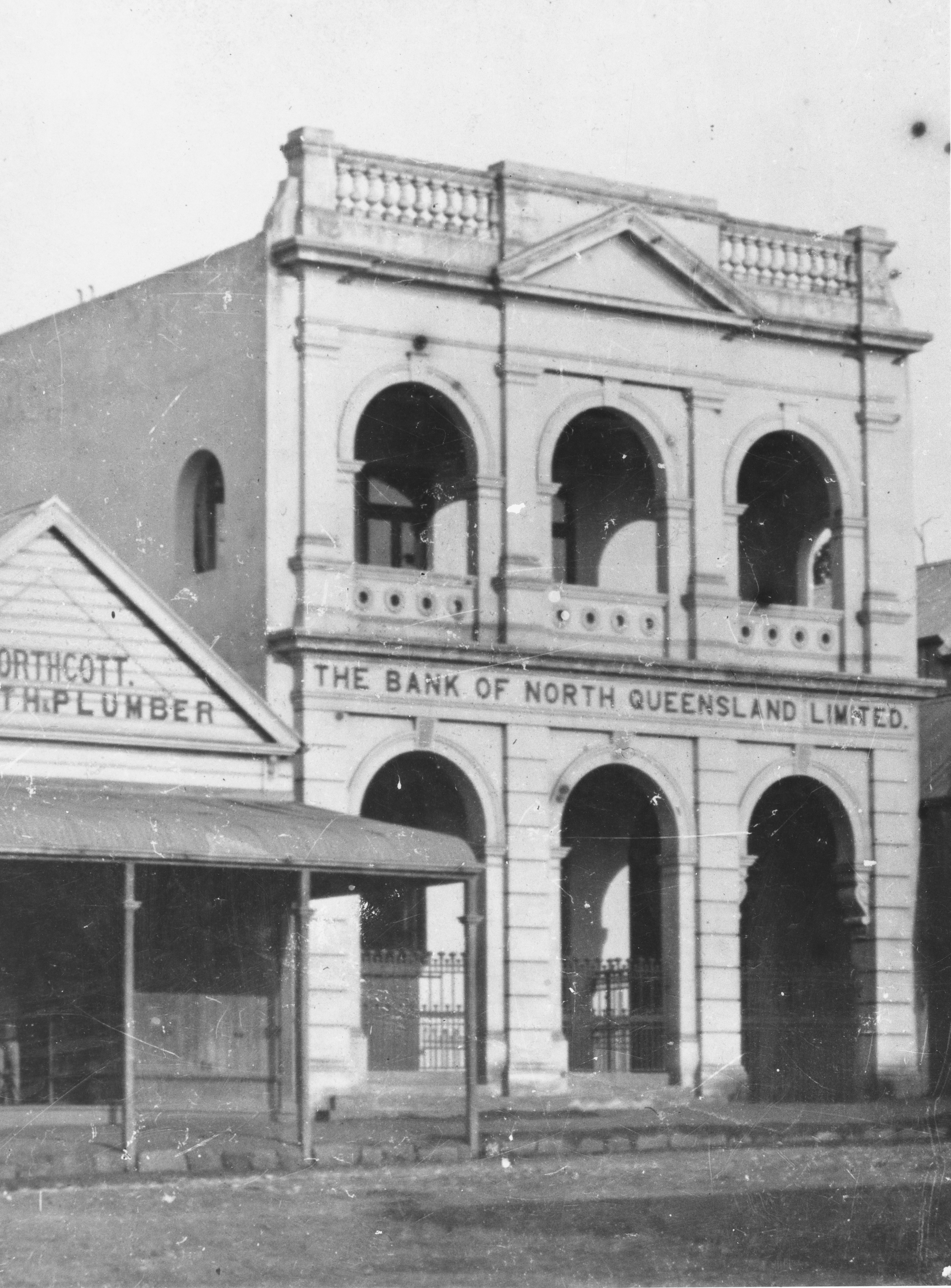
Bank of North Queensland, Cooktown, 1899

Even as the new building was opened, Cooktown's fortunes were waning. Output from the Palmer River gold fields declined as the alluvial gold was worked out, and Cooktown's importance as the principal supply port to the interior diminished accordingly. Just after the turn of the century, there was some renewed activity on the Palmer River, but this was not sustained at the volume anticipated. Cyclone damage in 1907 destroyed large numbers of Cooktown buildings which were never re-built, and the Cooktown branch of the Bank of North Queensland finally closed in January 1908. For some years it remained bank property, but was rented out as a residence - the Police Magistrate occupied the building in 1917.

In 1917 the Bank of North Queensland merged with the Royal Bank of Queensland to form the Bank of Queensland, and this in turn was taken over in 1922 by the National Bank of Australasia Ltd, which disposed of the Cooktown property in 1924. Title to the building was held by Walter Colley, and later his widow, from 1926 until 1948, when it passed to Cairns auctioneer and insurance agent Cornelius O'Leary. It has been held by the Ferrari family since 1963. The building is understood to have been used mostly as a residence until the 1970s. It was occupied for some years as a grocery store until closed in December 1992.

== Description ==
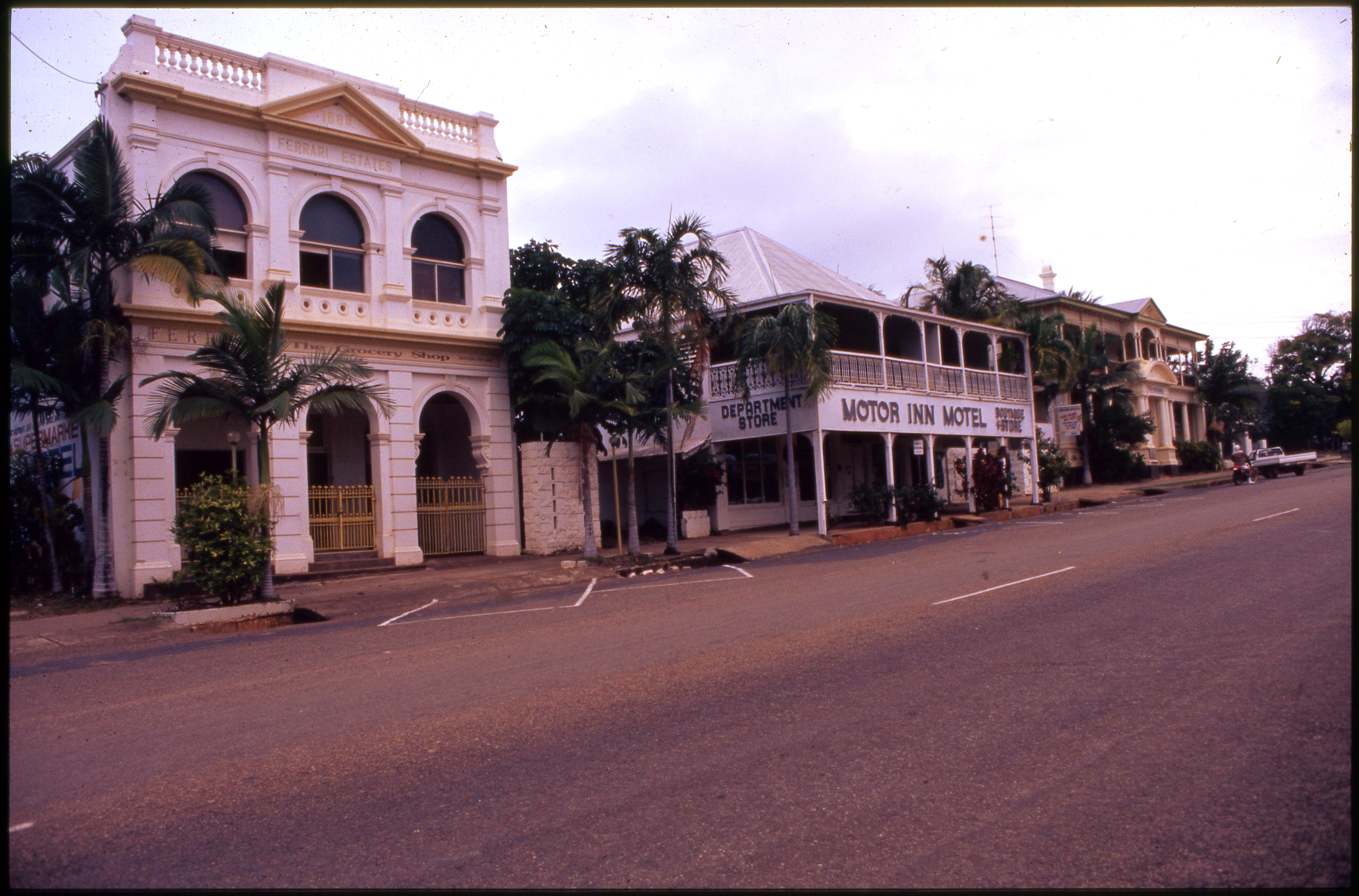
Ferrari Estates Building (left), circa 2018

The site faces due west to Charlotte Street and runs to the east rising to a large granite outcrop. The building which is two-storeyed and of rendered brick, has a rectangular plan form which runs to the street alignment. A single-storeyed wing runs off the north east corner at the rear of the building. The existing roof over the two- storeyed section is asymmetrically hipped.

At ground level the facade has a symmetrical three bay colonnade that has semi-circular headed openings with hood moulds and a keystone. The openings are supported on bracketed piers which are recessed between squared piers. At the carriage opening the semi-circular opening sits on brackets. A cornice divides the facade between ground and first floor levels.

The upper level is also divided into three bays with semi -circular headed openings similar to ground level but of lower in height, they are divided by pilasters and have been infilled with glazing. Above these windows is a further cornice with central triangular pediment. A balustrade rises above this. The southern openings provides access to what was the coach entry. The original wrought iron gates remain.

Internally a large proportion of the evidence of the original use of the building has been lost due to refurbishment, but evidence of the strongroom and position of the manager's office survives on the ground floor, and the original timber stair between floors remains against the east wall. The timber verandah along the south wall has been infilled with fibrous cement cladding.

== Heritage listing ==
Ferrari Estates Building was listed on the Queensland Heritage Register on 21 October 1992 having satisfied the following criteria.

The place is important in demonstrating the evolution or pattern of Queensland's history.

The former Bank of North Queensland at Cooktown, erected 1890–91, is important in illustrating the pattern of Queensland's history. It is surviving evidence of the establishment of Cooktown as an important regional centre and port in far north Queensland in the last quarter of the 19th century, and a symbol of both local and Queensland-wide business confidence in the future of Cooktown at this period.

The place demonstrates rare, uncommon or endangered aspects of Queensland's cultural heritage.

The building illustrates some rare aspects of Queensland's heritage: it is one of a small group of surviving Charlotte Street buildings which illustrate the hub of activity that was Cooktown from the 1870s to the 1890s; it is one of Cooktown's oldest buildings; it is of brick construction, which is rare in Cooktown; and, despite the refurbishments, still provides strong evidence of the adaptation of traditional European design to a tropical climate.

The place is important in demonstrating the principal characteristics of a particular class of cultural places.

Despite the removal of a number of interior walls, the form and street presence survive. The building remains a rare example of its type: a substantial, two-storeyed late 19th century North Queensland bank building containing banking chamber and manager's residence, constructed of rendered brick, with front and side verandahs to the upper level, illustrating the adaptive use of design in a remote tropical locale.

The place is important because of its aesthetic significance.

The building, located in the main commercial street in Cooktown, contributes aesthetically to an historical streetscape which includes the adjacent Seagren's Building and nearby Westpac Bank; the Cook Shire Council Chambers, Mary Watson's Monument and the former Cooktown Post Office on the opposite side of the street; and the early stone kerbing and channelling in Charlotte Street.
