= Cook Shire Council Chambers =

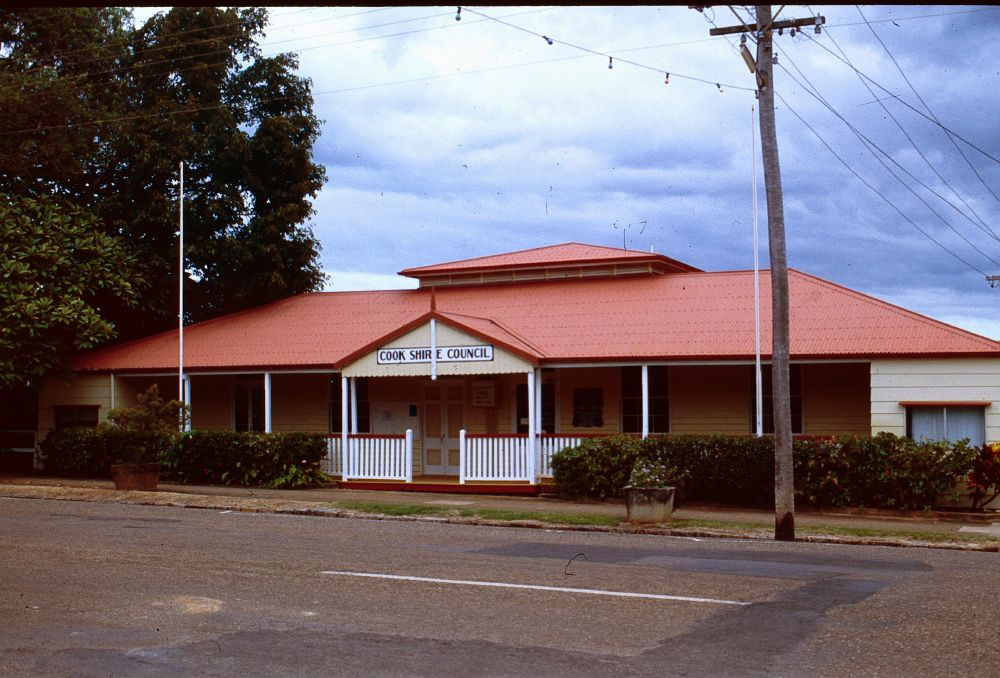
- Cook Shire Council Chambers, 1996

- Location within Queensland Location within Australia
- 15.4659°S 145.2493°E
- Location: 121 Charlotte Street, Cooktown, Shire of Cook, Queensland, Australia

History
- Design period: 1870s–1890s (late 19th century)
- Built: 1876–1877

Site notes
- Architectural style: Classicism

Queensland Heritage Register
- Official name: Cook Shire Council Chambers, Cooktown Post and Telegraph Office
- Type: state heritage (built)
- Designated: 8 April 1997
- Reference no.: 601535
- Significant period: 1876–1890s (historical)
- Significant components: views to, office/s, council chamber/meeting room
- Builders: Henry J Meldrum and John Sullivan

Cook Shire Council Chambers is a heritage-listed former town hall and now museum at 121 Charlotte Street, Cooktown, Shire of Cook, Queensland, Australia. It was built from 1876 to 1877 by Henry J Meldrum and John Sullivan. It was also known as Cooktown Post and Telegraph Office and is now known as Cooktown History Centre. It was added to the Queensland Heritage Register on 8 April 1997.

== Cooktown History Centre ==
Operated by the Cooktown and District Historical Society, the Cooktown History Centre features photographs and displays about the area's history and culture. Exhibits include the railway, early roads, cyclones and other disasters, early pioneer families and local indigenous people. The Centre also houses archives of local history.

== History ==
The former Cook Shire Council Chambers was constructed in 1876–77 as Cooktown's first purpose-built Post and Telegraph Office. Its function changed to that of municipal council offices in 1893, and it has retained this function for over a century.

The building is one of the earliest surviving in Cooktown, which was founded in October 1873 as the Endeavour River port for the important Palmer River goldfields. Cooktown developed almost overnight as a port and supply and administrative centre. Within six months of its establishment, the town had 20 restaurants, 12 large and 20 smaller stores, 6 butchers, 5 bakers, 3 tinsmiths, and chemists, fancy-goods shops, watchmakers, bootmakers and saddlers; 65 publican's licenses had been issued for the Cooktown-Palmer River district, with 30 more applied for by April 1874. There was an estimated 3,000 floating population in the town itself, and thousands of men en route to the goldfields. Two Cooktown newspapers were established in 1874, a state school, customs house, court house, and several churches were erected by 1875, and the town was declared a municipality on 5 April 1876. The 1876 census revealed a population of over 9,200 persons on the then extensive Palmer goldfields, and the town of Cooktown had a population of just under 2,200.

An unofficial post office was established in Cooktown from 1 January 1874, and became official later in the year. A line for the telegraph from Cooktown to Maytown, 150 miles (240 km) west on the Palmer goldfields, was opened on 25 April 1876.

Tenders for the Cooktown Post and Telegraph Office were called in the last quarter of 1875, but difficulties in letting the contract necessitated the tenders being re-advertised in March 1876. Finally the contract was let in July 1876 to Cooktown contractor Henry J Meldrum, who tendered with a price of £1,940. Meldrum disappeared later in the year, believed drowned, and the work was completed by Cooktown builder John Sullivan in June 1877.

At this period, Queensland post and telegraph offices were designed in the office of the colonial architect, FDG Stanley. As colonial architect, Stanley also designed the Cooktown Powder Magazine (1874) and the first wing of the Cooktown Hospital (1879), and in private practice prepared plans for St Mary's Convent at Cooktown (1888–89) (now Cooktown Museum, formerly James Cook Historical Museum) and the former Cooktown Queensland National Bank [1890–92] (now Westpac Bank Building, Cooktown). When plans were being prepared for the Cooktown Post and Telegraph Office in 1875, Queensland post and telegraph services were still operating independently, the two not amalgamated until 1879, but for economy were likely to be located in the same building. The Cooktown Post and Telegraph Office therefore provided for separate post and telegraph offices and separate residences for the postmaster and telegraph office master, back-to-back in a single, mirror-imaged, timber building. Compared with earlier designs, which were little more than cottages with one room or an enclosed verandah serving as a post or telegraph office, mid-1870s designs provided more generous space for post and telegraph functions. However, the Cooktown building soon proved inadequate for the volume of mail and telegraph services being demanded.

If Cooktown had "mushroomed" in the mid-1870s, it positively "boomed" in the 1880s. The Cooktown railway was constructed from Cooktown to Laura between 1884 and 1888, further opening the port to development. By the late 1880s Cooktown had become the important centre not only of a thriving mining district (boosted by the 1887 discovery of tin along the Annan River), but also of pearling, beche-de-mer, and pastoral activity. After 1885, Cooktown was also the main port for Queensland trade with New Guinea. Despite the decline in alluvial output from the Palmer River goldfields from the mid-1880s, and the corresponding decline in the importance of Cooktown as the principal port of Far North Queensland from the early 1890s, by the turn of the century the Cook and Palmer census districts still had a population of just under 6,000, (despite less than 1,300 persons on the Palmer, Coen and Hamilton goldfields) and the municipality of Cooktown retained a population of nearly 2,000.

In 1887, a new post and telegraph office was constructed adjacent to the 1876–1877 building, and the office sections of the first building were modified in 1888 as additions to the telegraph master's and postmaster's residences. At this time some of the windows in the front (formerly public) rooms of the building were replaced with French doors, and a lattice screen was erected along the front verandah. However, the building remained in use as residences only another four years. Constructed on a former mangrove swamp on land at the base of the ridge running south from Grassy Hill, the site was inundated with water during the wet season and lacked proper drainage. The place was considered unhealthy, and the residences were vacated in 1892.

In late December 1892, the 1876–77 post and telegraph building was occupied as the temporary Chambers of the Cooktown Municipal Council, after fire destroyed the adjacent Town Hall on 12 December. The building was taken over permanently by the Municipal Council in March 1893. In 1903 the Cooktown Municipal Council became a Town Council, and remained so until 1932, when it became part of the Shire of Cook. Alterations to the building were undertaken in the 1970s, when a number of internal partitions were removed and the north and south verandahs enclosed. It is not clear whether the kitchen wing and western half of the former residential wing were removed at this time or at an earlier period. The building continued to function as the administrative offices of Cook Shire Council until the shire moved to its new offices at 10 Furneaux Street.

In 2016, the building is used as the Cooktown History Centre.

== Description ==
Cook Shire Council Chambers is located on the west side of Charlotte Street, the principal street in Cooktown, on a site that slopes down towards the Endeavour River at the rear. It contributes to the streetscape and forms a visual grouping with the adjacent 1887 Post and Telegraph Office to the north. It is located within a group of culturally significant buildings and civic works, including the adjacent post office and north of this the former Daintree Divisional Board's offices, Mary Watson's Monument (1886) on the nearby road reserve, the stone kerbing and channelling along Charlotte Street (1880s), and on the other side of the street, the former Seagren's Building (1880s), the former Bank of North Queensland (1892) and the former Queensland National Bank (1892).

The building is single-storeyed and constructed in timber supported by round steel columns. The original timber chamferboards remain on the eastern and western faces except where the ends of the southern and northern verandahs have been enclosed with a fibrous cement material. Although the building has undergone some alteration its original T-shaped plan form with surrounding verandah is still evident. There have been some extensions in the north west corner, and the kitchen wing and the western half the original residential wing have been removed.

A low pitched hipped roof runs along the front of the building which projects over the verandahs and is supported on timber posts. The verandahs have been enclosed on all but the street elevation. A gable roof, that accentuates the entrance to the building, projects from the centre of the front verandah. Early French doors and double hung windows open onto the front and side verandahs of this section of the building.

Running at right angles to the front section of the building is the rear wing which has a hipped roof sitting above the ridge line of the front section of the building. There are enclosed verandahs on the north and south sides of this section. The west elevation consists of a truncated gable running up to the hipped section of the roof.

The interior has been adapted for use as the offices of the Council of the Shire of Cook, presently housing the Council's Administration and Engineering Departments. A number of walls have been removed to create larger spaces but the original layout remains legible. Some walls have been covered in sheet lining material.

== Heritage listing ==
Cook Shire Council Chambers was listed on the Queensland Heritage Register on 8 April 1997 having satisfied the following criteria.

The place is important in demonstrating the evolution or pattern of Queensland's history.

Cook Shire Council Chambers, constructed in 1876–77 as Cooktown's first purpose-built Post and Telegraph Office, is associated with the early settlement of Cooktown as the port for the Palmer River goldfields, and as such is important in illustrating the pattern of development of Queensland's history. In particular, it survives as an important illustration of colonial government support accorded to the establishment of Cooktown in the 1870s.

The place demonstrates rare, uncommon or endangered aspects of Queensland's cultural heritage.

Cook Shire Council Chambers, one of the earliest buildings in Cooktown and one of the few early government buildings to survive, is significant for its rarity value. The only other surviving government buildings of Cooktown's establishment phase are the Powder Magazine (1875–1876) and the former Cooktown hospital (1879).

The place is important because of its aesthetic significance.

The place is important for its aesthetic contribution to the streetscape along central Charlotte Street, forming a visual grouping with the adjacent 1887 Post and Telegraph Office to the north and other culturally significant buildings and civic works nearby.

The place has a special association with the life or work of a particular person, group or organisation of importance in Queensland's history.

The place is significant for its close association with the work of the Cooktown Municipal Council (later the Cooktown Town Council) and with the Cook Shire Council, for over a century.
