= Seagren's Building =

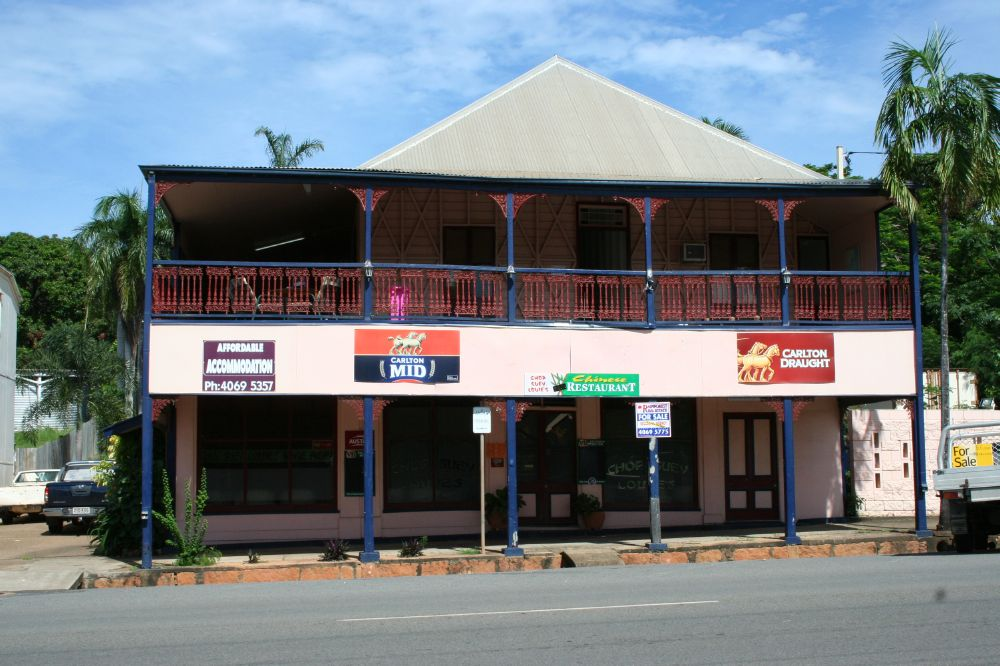
- Seagren's Building, 2010

- Location within Queensland Location within Australia
- 15.4669°S 145.25°E
- Location: 124 Charlotte Street, Cooktown, Queensland, Australia

History
- Design period: 1870s–1890s (late 19th century)
- Built: 1880s–c. 1900

Queensland Heritage Register
- Official name: Motor Inn Motel, Seagren's Building
- Type: state heritage (built)
- Designated: 21 October 1992
- Reference no.: 600420
- Significant period: 1880s–1900s (fabric); 1880s–1930s (historical)
- Significant components: workshop, shop/s, residential accommodation – house/quarters above shop/s

Seagren's Building is a heritage-listed workshop at 124 Charlotte Street, Cooktown, Shire of Cook, Queensland, Australia. It was built from 1880s to c. 1900. It is also known as Motor Inn Motel and Seagren's Inn. It was added to the Queensland Heritage Register on 21 October 1992.

== History ==
This two-storeyed timber and galvanised iron building was constructed in the 1880s for Cooktown cabinet maker and furniture dealer, Pher Erick Seagren (Sjorgren), who acquired the site (allotment 11 of section 3, parish of Cook) in 1880. Photographic evidence reveals that the building was extant by the late 1880s at least, although the northern side verandah was not added until around the turn of the century. The upper level of the building was the Seagren family residence, with the lower level a furniture display room/shop. A c. 1888 photograph also indicates a large workshop attached to the rear of the building. Whether part of this survives in the present rear extension has yet to be determined.

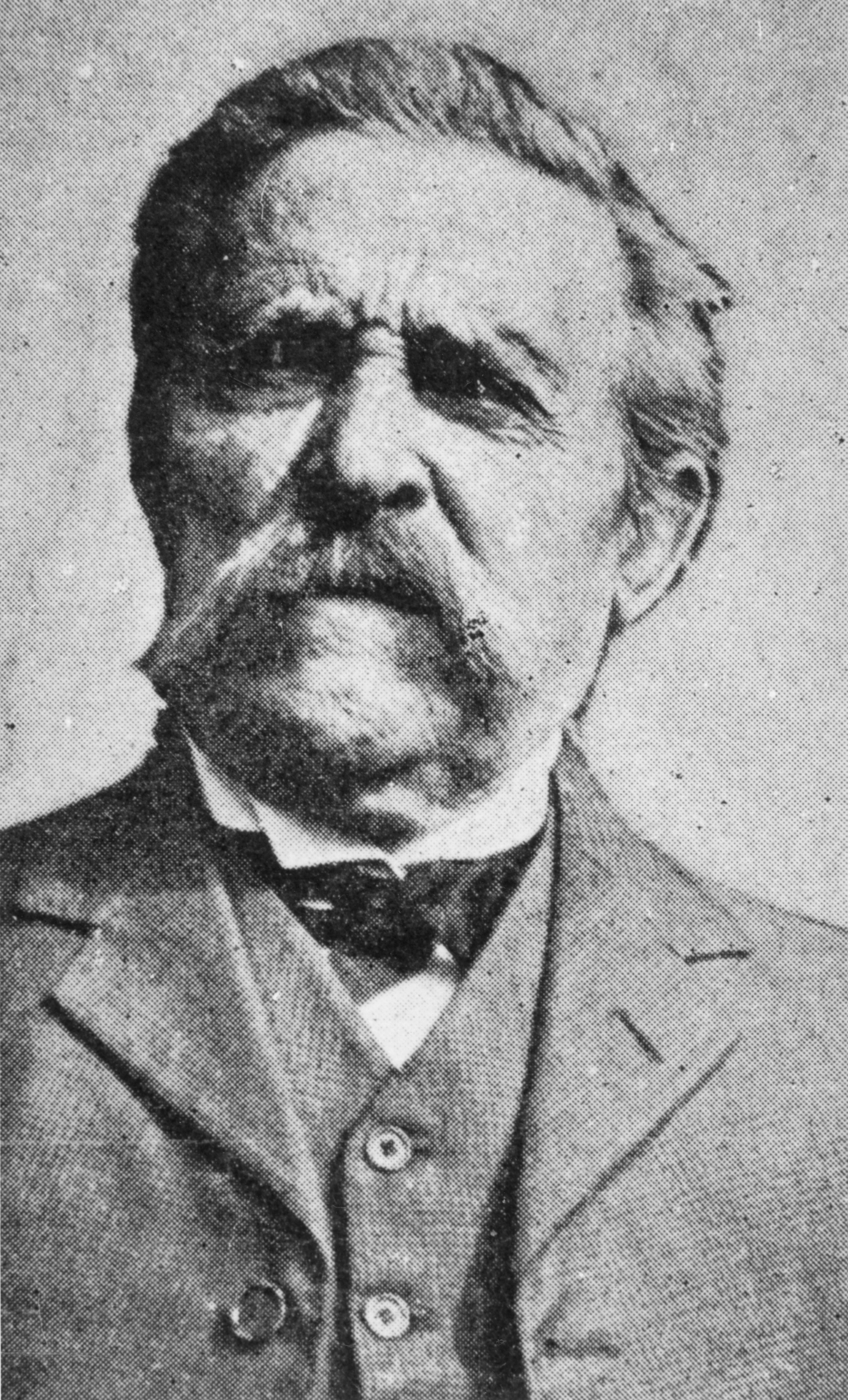
Pher Erick Seagren, Cooktown pioneer

PE Seagren was born in Sweden in 1845. Following an apprenticeship in cabinetmaking, he worked in his trade in Copenhagen before emigrating to the Queensland in his mid-twenties, arriving at Rockhampton in 1871. In 1873, he married, at Rockhampton, Rosetta Bradish, a London emigrant who also had arrived in Rockhampton in 1871. Intending to join in the Palmer River goldrush, Seagren travelled to Cooktown in February 1874, but chose instead to establish himself in his trade at the burgeoning port. He was one of the town's earliest citizens, and according to local tradition his son, William Erick Endeavour, was the first white male born at Cooktown, on 26 August 1874.

Cooktown was founded in October 1873 as the Endeavour River port for the Palmer River goldfields, and within six months had 20 restaurants, 12 large and 20 smaller stores, 6 butchers, 5 bakers, 3 tinsmiths, and chemists, fancygoods shops, watchmakers, bootmakers and saddlers; 65 publican's licenses had been issued for the Cooktown-Palmer River district, with 30 more applied for by April 1874. Two Cooktown newspapers were established in 1874, and the town was declared a municipality on 5 April 1876. A railway was constructed from Cooktown to Laura between 1884 and 1888, further opening the port to development. By the turn of the century the Cooktown-Palmer River district had a population of 35,000 (15,000 Europeans and 20,000 Chinese) and Cooktown had become the important centre not only of a thriving mining district, but also of pearling, beche-de-mer, and pastoral activity.

In the 1880s, Queensland Post Office Directories Seagren was listed as a cabinetmaker and furniture dealer and upholsterer, general importer, and a furniture, glass and china dealer. In August 1889, Seagren advertised as a cabinetmaker and upholsterer, whose furniture warehouse and china and glass bazaar was located near the Queensland National Bank in Charlotte Street, the principal thoroughfare of Cooktown. This equates with the position of the present building.

By 1898, PE Seagren had acquired the adjoining northern allotment, containing two shops, and c. 1900 an upper level verandah was added to the northern side of his shop-house. This was enclosed below as shop space. Seagren acquired the adjoining southern allotment, which contained a small shop, in 1915.

By the early 1900s, output from the Palmer goldfield was declining, and Cooktown's significance as a regional port correspondingly decreased. The Charlotte Street building survived the cyclone of 1907 and the 1918 fire which destroyed the buildings on the opposite side of the street, but following PE Seagren's death at Cooktown in 1934, aged 88, the furniture warehouse was closed. Seagren-manufactured furniture reputedly became collector's items.

PE Seagren was one of the earliest settlers of Cooktown, a substantial landholder in the district, a resident of Cooktown for 60 years, and a prominent and highly respected member of his community. He was keen to encourage Cooktown's progress, and was actively involved in municipal work for many years, beginning with three years on the Daintree Divisional Board (1892–95) prior to being elected to the Cooktown Municipal Council in 1895. He served as mayor of Cooktown for two terms: 1898–1901 and 1905–1908.

Seagren's contribution to his community has been described as follows:

"He has laboured for the improvement of the town with unsparing energy, and the excellent condition of the streets, footpaths, and other public works is due to his progressive methods when mayor.

Seagren was a Justice of the Peace, and held positions on the Hospital Board and School Advisory Board.

In 1924, title to the Charlotte Street property was transferred to Seagren's only surviving child, Mrs Gertrude Blanche Muller, and following her death in 1949, to her children Mrs Malvine Rosetta Blanche Johnson and Erick Seagren Muller, who sold the building in 1952. Little has been recorded of the use of the building between the mid-1930s and the late 1960s, when Margaret Edmonds and Adrienne (Bobby) Gravenor established a newsagency, boutique and tourist information centre in the downstairs shop. They acquired title to the property in 1973, and by 1975 had converted the building into the Motor Inn Motel.

Later it operated as a hotel under the name Seagren's Inn. In 2016, the building is for sale.

== Description ==
The site rises from Charlotte Street to the east and the building responds to this. The two-storeyed front section is at street level and the adjoining rear single-storeyed section is at a half level above this.

The front section has a steep hipped roof which runs back to a gable end and drops down to a lower gable roof. Attached to this is a single storey lean-to.

The building is constructed in timber and has an exposed frame at first floor level. The remainder of the building is clad in fibrous cement sheeting either replacing or covering original corrugated iron.

A two-storeyed verandah with cast iron balustrade at first floor level runs along Charlotte Street and returns along the northside. The balustrade panels appear to have been re-positioned. There are two varieties of verandah bracket some of which are later. A deep valance exists below the verandah level which traditionally has been used for signage. The verandah is supported on timber posts that divide the original section of the verandah into four equal bays with a fifth wider bay, that was added, on the northern end. A divider is situated on the verandah at first floor level to the north of the central hall.

A shop is situated on the ground floor that runs the depth of the two storey section and has a set of French doors at the entrance with large timber-framed windows each side. The original wide horizontal timber panelling is in evidence on the walls.

An entrance to the stair from the street is situated on the south side that leads up to the verandah along Charlotte Street. Early 20th century extensions enclose the north side. The first floor is divided into guest rooms running off a central hall. The interior of the rear section of the building appears to have been altered.

== Heritage listing ==
Seagren's Building was listed on the Queensland Heritage Register on 21 October 1992 having satisfied the following criteria.

The place is important in demonstrating the evolution or pattern of Queensland's history.

The former Seagren's Building, erected in the 1880s, illustrates the pattern of Queensland's history. It is important surviving evidence of the establishment of Cooktown as an important regional centre and port in far north Queensland in the last quarter of the 19th century. The place is illustrative of the boom years of the mid-to-late 1880s when Cooktown appeared to have an unlimited future. It is important also in illustrating the contribution of non-English-speaking immigration to the development of Queensland.

The place demonstrates rare, uncommon or endangered aspects of Queensland's cultural heritage.

The building illustrates some rare aspects of Queensland's heritage: it is one of a small group of surviving Charlotte Street buildings which illustrate the hub of activity that was Cooktown in the 1870s, 1880s and early 1890s; it is one of Cooktown's oldest buildings and the last remaining structure of its type along Charlotte Street; and, despite the conversion to a motel, also provides rare surviving evidence of a far north Queensland shop-house of this period.

The place has potential to yield information that will contribute to an understanding of Queensland's history.

The place has the potential to contribute to our understanding of Queensland's cultural heritage. Little is known to date of the influence of Scandinavian building techniques and/or design on 19th century Queensland construction, and the former Seagren's Building may prove important in future studies.

The place is important in demonstrating the principal characteristics of a particular class of cultural places.

Despite adaptation to a motel, the core and fabric survive substantially intact. The building remains a rare example of its type: a two-storeyed late 19th century North Queensland shop-house constructed of timber framing and galvanised iron cladding, with front and side verandahs to the upper level, illustrating the adaptive use of portable building materials and of design in a remote tropical locale.

The place is important because of its aesthetic significance.

The building, located in the main commercial street in Cooktown, contributes aesthetically to an historical streetscape which includes the adjacent Westpac Bank Building and former Bank of North Queensland, the Cook Shire Council Chambers, Mary Watson's Monument and the former Cooktown Post Office on the opposite side of the street; and the early stone kerbing and channelling in Charlotte Street.

The place has a special association with the life or work of a particular person, group or organisation of importance in Queensland's history.

The place is significant for its long association with the life and work of Cooktown cabinet maker, furniture dealer and civic leader, Phers Erick Seagren, a Swedish immigrant who was instrumental in shaping the development of Cooktown in the late 19th and early 20th centuries.
