= Cook Shire Hall =

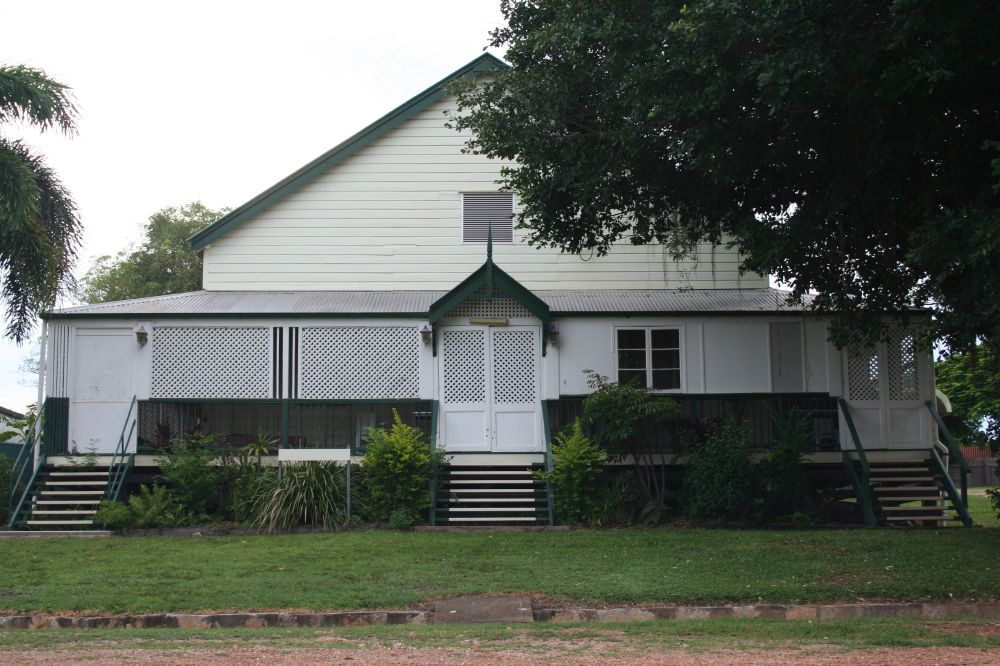
- Cook Shire Hall, 2010

- Location within Queensland Location within Australia
- 15.4706°S 145.2502°E
- Location: Helen Street, Cooktown, Shire of Cook, Queensland, Australia

History
- Design period: 1900–1914 (early 20th century)
- Built: 1907

Queensland Heritage Register
- Official name: Cook Shire Hall, Cooktown Presbyterian Church, Oddfellows Hall, Standen's Hall
- Type: state heritage (built)
- Designated: 8 April 1997
- Reference no.: 601704
- Significant period: 1900s–1930s, 1950s (historical); 1907–ongoing (social)
- Significant components: council chamber/meeting room, office/s, hall

Cook Shire Hall is a heritage-listed community hall at Helen Street, Cooktown, Shire of Cook, Queensland, Australia. It was built from 1907. It is also known as Cooktown Presbyterian Church, Oddfellows Hall, and Standen's Hall. It was added to the Queensland Heritage Register on 8 April 1997.

== History ==
This building was erected in 1907 for the Loyal Captain Cook Lodge of the North Queensland Branch of the Manchester Unity Independent Order of Oddfellows Friendly Society, and served as the Lodge's hall and meeting venue until at least 1936. It is understood to have been hired out for public entertainments during this period also. It replaced an earlier building constructed in 1890 as the Cooktown Presbyterian Church, which was destroyed in the January 1907 cyclone which devastated much of Cooktown.

Title to the site (Lot 122 on plan C1793), a 40-perch (1,000 m^{2}) allotment in Helen Street on the ridge overlooking the Endeavour River estuary, was transferred in October 1889 to the trustees of the Cooktown Presbyterian Church, whose parish was established that year. Although alienated since 1875, the site appears to have been vacant at the time of transfer to the church trustees, who awarded a contract for the construction of Cooktown's first Presbyterian Church the following March. The building was completed within 5 months and dedicated on 3 August 1890. At this time, output from the Palmer goldfields was declining, and Cooktown's importance as the principal supply port to the interior diminished subsequently. The number of Presbyterian parishioners declined almost as soon as their church was completed, and on 2 October 1892 the charge was declared vacant. The building was used for occasional Presbyterian and Anglican services and by community groups such as the Liedertafel (choir singers) until title was transferred in June 1906 to The Trustees of the Loyal Captain Cook Lodge of the North Queensland Branch of the Manchester Unity Independent Order of Oddfellows Friendly Society. The Loyal Captain Cook Lodge was established in Cooktown in 1884, meeting in the Cooktown Town Hall. The Lodge acquired land in Charlotte Street in 1891, but never built on it, instead purchasing the former Presbyterian Church in 1906. Less than a year later the building was destroyed by a severe cyclone in January 1907, but was rebuilt immediately in its present form, apparently to much the same footprint as the original building. Physical evidence suggests some of the timbers from the first building, particularly uprights and verandah posts, were utilised in the second structure. Whether the 8-inch-deep (20 cm) chamferboards date to 1890 or to 1907 has not been determined.

The Loyal Captain Cook Lodge continued to meet in the hall until at least 1936, when the property was sold to Charles Victor Standen, accountant and secretary of the Lodge from c. 1927 until his death in December 1938. The Standen family were very early residents of Cooktown and had a hardware and timber business in the town. It is likely the Lodge continued to meet in the hall after the sale to Standen, but this has not been verified. Title was transferred to CV Standen in February 1937, and following his death passed to his widow, who made Standen's Hall available for public hire until it was acquired by Cook Shire Council in mid-1951, since which time the building has served as Cooktown's only Shire Hall. It is still used for public entertainment, including film screenings, and in effect is Cooktown's only cinema.

The adjacent allotment (Lot 123 on plan C1793) was never owned by the Presbyterian Church or by the Oddfellows. It was acquired by the Cook Shire Council in 1941, and although now part of the Shire Hall grounds, has not been included in the entry in the Queensland Heritage Register for Cook Shire Hall.

== Description ==
Cook Shire Hall is located in Helen Street on the crest of the ridge running south from Grassy Hill, above the main street of Cooktown. The hall, which has a simple rectangular floor plan, runs on an east- west axis on the site which slopes moderately down to Helen Street from the east. It is constructed entirely of timber and sits on timber stumps, with the western end approximately 1 metre (3 ft 3 in) above the ground. It has verandahs on three sides. A medium pitched gable roof sits above the line of the verandahs and is clad in corrugated iron. The gable ends and side walls above the verandah are clad in rusticated weatherboard (chamferboards).

The verandahs are infilled on the north and west sides with timber lattice above a close-boarded balustrade and with weatherboard on the east side. The western verandah is accessed by timber steps located in its centre, and northwest and southwest corners. Over the central stair is a small gable roof that accentuates the main entrance to the hall.

The walls are clad in timber that have a tongue and grove beaded profile inside and a rusticated profile (chamferboard) outside. They are fixed to exposed frames facing onto the verandahs.

A suspended ceiling has been installed which covers the original tongue and groove beaded ceiling. The original ceiling has a flat centre and follows the line of the roof frame at its edges.

== Heritage listing ==
Cook Shire Hall was listed on the Queensland Heritage Register on 8 April 1997 having satisfied the following criteria.

The place is important in demonstrating the evolution or pattern of Queensland's history.

Cook Shire Hall is significant historically for its close association with public entertainment in Cooktown since the first decade of the 20th century. It is Cooktown's only surviving public hall, and has been the venue for most of Cooktown's public entertainments and functions since its construction in 1907, nearly 90 years ago.

The place has a strong or special association with a particular community or cultural group for social, cultural or spiritual reasons.

As such, the place has a special association for the residents of Cooktown and the surrounding district as the venue for many memorable local public events, wedding celebrations and general entertainment.

The place has a special association with the life or work of a particular person, group or organisation of importance in Queensland's history.

The place is also significant for its strong association with the work of the North Queensland Branch of the Manchester Unity International Order of Oddfellows Friendly Society in Cooktown, being the property and meeting place of the Loyal Captain Cook Lodge for at least three decades.
