= Mount Cook National Park, Australia =

National park in Australia

Mount Cook National Park
- IUCN category II (national park)
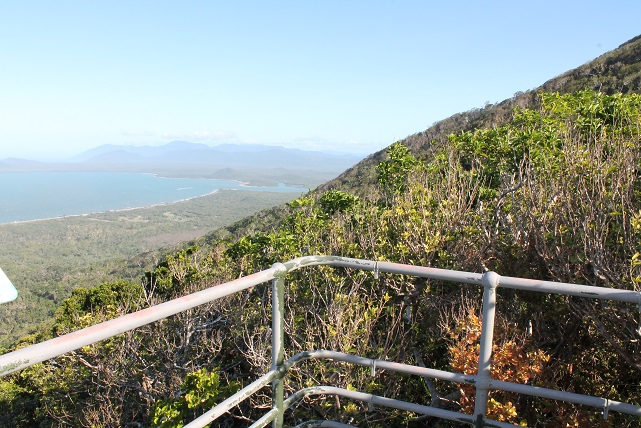

- Location within Queensland
- Location: Queensland
- Nearest city: Cooktown
- Coordinates: 15.491°S 145.260°E
- Area: 5.02 km^{2} (1.94 sq mi)
- Established: 1970
- Governing body: Queensland Parks and Wildlife Service

Mount Cook National Park is a protected area in the locality of Cooktown, in the Shire of Cook, Queensland, Australia.

== Geography ==
The national park is immediately south of the town of Cooktown.

The terrain ranges from 0 to 431 metres (0 to 1,414 ft) above sea level. The mountain Mount Cook is in the east of the national park (15.4906°S 145.2642°E). Also known as Gore Mount, it rises 431 metres (1,414 ft) above sea level, the highest point in the national park.

It is 1,554 km (966 mi) north-west of Brisbane. It was established in 1970 and is managed by the Queensland Parks and Wildlife Service.

Within this National Park is a difficult walking track that is six kilometres (3.7 mi) return to the summit of Mount Cook.

== See also ==
- Protected areas of Queensland
