= Cooktown Museum =

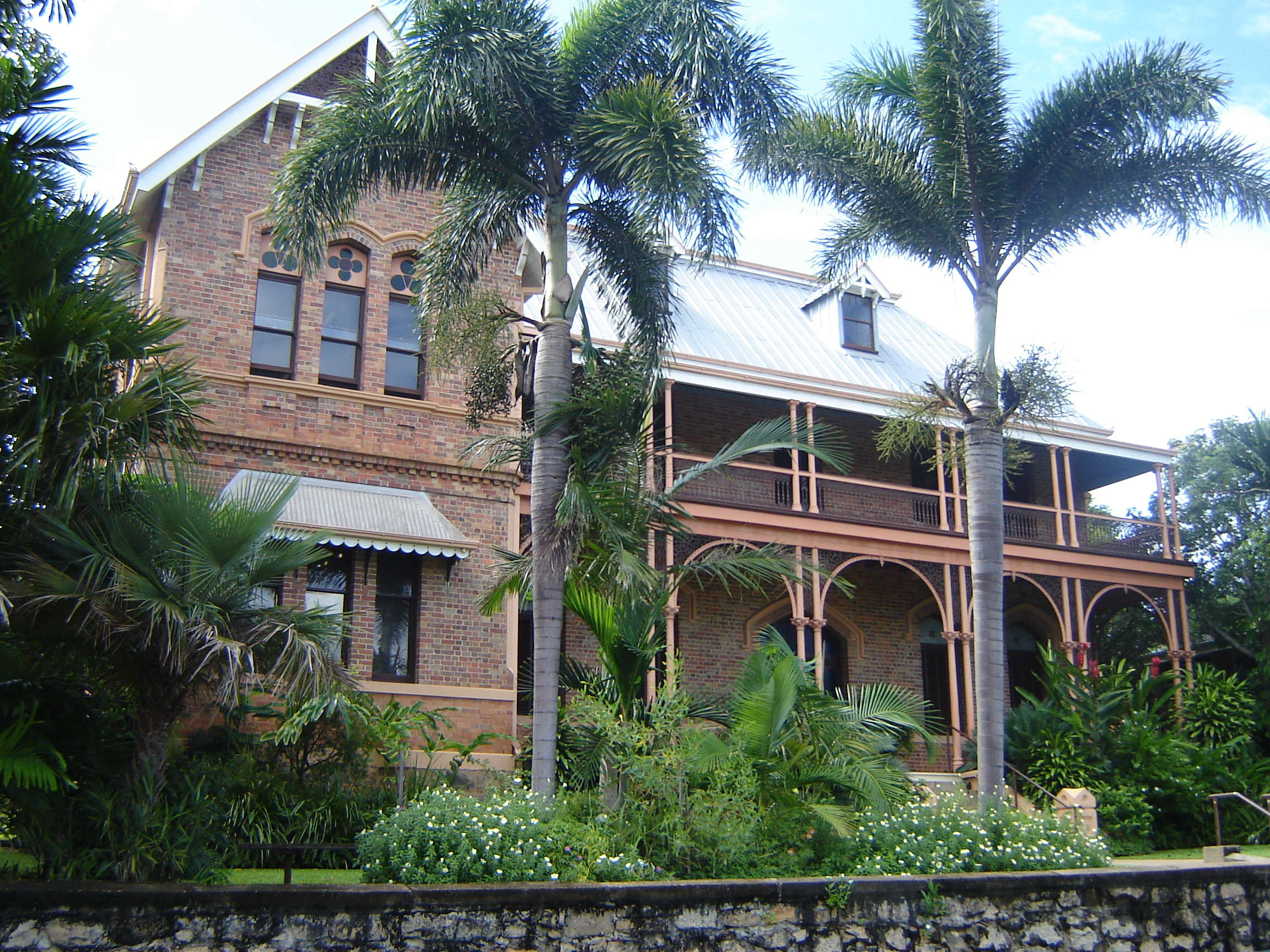
- James Cook Historical Museum, 2006

- Location within Queensland Location within Australia
- 15.4689°S 145.2506°E
- Location: Furneaux Street, Cooktown, Shire of Cook, Queensland, Australia

History
- Design period: 1870s–1890s (late 19th century)
- Built: 1888–1889

Site notes
- Architect: Francis Drummond Greville Stanley

Queensland Heritage Register
- Official name: James Cook Historical Museum, St Mary's Convent and School
- Type: State heritage (built)
- Designated: 21 October 1992
- Reference no.: 600423
- Significant period: 1888–1941 (historical school/convent); 1970s–ongoing (historical museum); 1941–45 (historical US occ
- Significant components: Kitchen/kitchen house, garden/grounds, school/school room
- Builders: Hobbs & Carter

Cooktown Museum (formerly James Cook Historical Museum) is a heritage-listed former convent and school and now museum at Furneaux Street, Cooktown, Shire of Cook, Queensland, Australia. It was designed by Francis Drummond Greville Stanley and built from 1888 to 1889 Hobbs & Carter. It was formerly known as St Mary's Convent and School. It was added to the Queensland Heritage Register on 21 October 1992 (under the name James Cook Historical Museum).

== History ==
This substantial, two-storeyed brick building was erected in 1888–1889 as St Mary's Convent and School. It was the inspiration of the first Vicar Apostolic of Cooktown, Bishop John Hutchinson; designed by former colonial architect Francis Drummond Greville Stanley, of Brisbane; and staffed initially by Sisters of Mercy from Dunvargan in Ireland.

Bishop Hutchinson was one of three Irish Augustinian Fathers who arrived in Cooktown in 1884 to take charge of the Pro-Vicariate of North Queensland, established in 1876 and extending from Cardwell to Cape York Peninsula. In the mid-1880s it was appropriate that the Augustinians were based at Cooktown, rather than Cairns, as the former was emerging as the principal town and port of far North Queensland. Such was the rapid progress of Cooktown during the second half of the 1880s that the Pro-Vicariate of North Queensland was constituted the Vicariate Apostolic of Cooktown in 1887. Father Hutchinson was appointed the first Vicar Apostolic and was consecrated a Bishop in August the same year. In late 1887 Bishop Hutchinson returned to Ireland to recruit more priests and to encourage an order of sisters to establish a convent school at Cooktown. There was an existing primary school, staffed by lay teachers, attached to St Mary's Pro-Cathedral in Cooktown, but Bishop Hutchinson envisaged a grander establishment which could offer a superior education, both religious and academic, to the girls (future wives and mothers) of Far North Queensland. It was to operate as both a day school and a boarding school for girls.

St Mary's Convent and School was designed by former colonial architect FDG Stanley, one of Queensland's most prolific late 19th century architects. In the 1880s he designed a number of other Catholic churches and institutional buildings, including St Patrick's Church at Gympie (1883–88), additions to St Mary's Church at Maryborough (1884–85), dormitories at St Vincent's Orphanage, Nudgee (1886–87), Holy Cross Church at Bundaberg (1886–88), the Magdalene Asylum at Wooloowin, Brisbane (1888–89), and the Sisters of Mercy Convent at South Brisbane (1889).

The tender for St Mary's Convent and School at Cooktown was let about May 1888 to Brisbane contractors Hobbs & Carter, who had erected the much admired Cook Monument at Cooktown in 1887. When Bishop Hutchinson returned from Ireland in June 1888 with five Sisters of Mercy to staff the school, the convent building was far from complete, but work continued rapidly and the building was occupied by May 1889.

Stanley's original design was for a two-storeyed brick core with two transverse wings, but when officially opened by Bishop Hutchinson on 12 May 1889, only the core and north wing had been completed, at a cost of nearly £5,000. The intention was to complete the second wing as funds permitted, but this did not eventuate. The substantial brick building was the most imposing structure in Cooktown, pre-dating the Queensland National Bank building in Charlotte Street by about two years. The footings were of concrete and the plinth was constructed of Cooktown granite. Most of the bricks were obtained from Campbell & Sons' brickworks in Brisbane, and shipped to Cooktown. Much of the skilled labour required for the construction also came from Brisbane.

Internally, the ground floor comprised a central entrance hall, off which opened a large dining room (also used as the school chapel) to the right and a large reception room for visitors to the left. Behind these rooms were two classrooms, each divided by folding doors. Beyond the reception room was the school hall, a large room 44 by 18 feet (13.4 by 5.5 m), which occupied most of the ground floor of the north wing. Beyond the eastern end of the hall were the lavatories. A central staircase led from the entrance hall to the upper floor, which contained boarders' dormitories at the north end and dormitories for the sisters at the south end. Upper floor lavatories and bathrooms were located above the ground floor lavatories at the east end of the north wing. Boarders used a second staircase on the rear verandah, rather than the grand central stair. At the rear, the kitchen, scullery and servant's room formed a detached wing, connected to the main building via a covered way. Stanley had taken account of the Cooktown climate: the rooms were large, light and airy, and there were deep verandahs front and back. The rear verandahs were enclosed with "curtain boards", and the front verandahs were decorated with cast iron.

The site selected was on the crest of the ridge running south from Grassy Hill, above the main street of Cooktown, with a spectacular view over the Endeavour River estuary. By the 1890s the imposing building had become a Cooktown landmark, regularly featured in visiting journalists' descriptions of the town.

Bishop Hutchinson had made the establishment of the convent school at Cooktown a personal project, donating much of his own money and borrowing from his relatives in Ireland, but substantial funds were raised locally as well. The community clearly recognised the need for an educational institution for girls in far North Queensland which offered a superior education to that available in small local state schools, and St Mary's was patronised by families of all denominations. It was the first girls' high school in the area and gained a strong reputation for the quality of its music curriculum. World-acclaimed Queensland singer Gladys Moncrieff was educated there.

The significance of Cooktown as a port deteriorated in the 1890s, as production from the alluvial diggings on the Palmer Goldfields declined. Bishop Hutchinson died in 1897, and his successor, Bishop James Murray, is understood to have paid off the debt on the convent building by conducting a lecture tour in the United States. In 1906 Bishop Murray moved his residence to Cairns, which had eclipsed Cooktown as the principal port of far North Queensland.

Despite the decline of Cooktown - both in population and significance - St Mary's Convent and School remained an important educational facility for girls in far North Queensland until the 1930s. The building suffered substantial damage during the cyclone of January 1907, which demolished the Catholic Church behind the convent and removed part of the convent roof, but was repaired immediately. However, many of the businesses destroyed in the 1907 cyclone were not re-established, and an entire block of shops and offices in the main street of Cooktown, destroyed by fire in 1919, were never re-built. St Mary's boarding school closed in the 1930s but co-educational day classes were continued until 1941, when the building is understood to have been commandeered by United States military authorities.

Although the building was returned to the Church in 1945 after the war, the school was not re-opened and the Sisters never returned. Another cyclone damaged the building in 1949 and by 1969 it was considered to be in such a ruinous state that tenders for its demolition were called. Following public protest, the building was donated to the National Trust of Queensland on condition that it be restored to house the collection of the James Cook Historical Museum at Cooktown. The new Museum was opened on 22 April 1970 by Her Majesty Queen Elizabeth II, during her visit to Australia to celebrate the bi-centenary of Cook's charting of the east coast. The former St Mary's Convent and School continues to be maintained by the National Trust, and is one of the principal tourist attractions in Cooktown. In the early 1970s, extensions were made to the rear of the building to house the museum collection. The grounds have been landscaped as the Joseph Banks Memorial Garden, planted with about 40 of the 186 plants catalogued by Joseph Banks and Dr Daniel Solander during their 7-week stay at the Endeavour River in 1770. Each of these 40 plants is peculiar to the Cooktown area.

In December 2021, the museum was renamed Cooktown Museum.

== Description ==
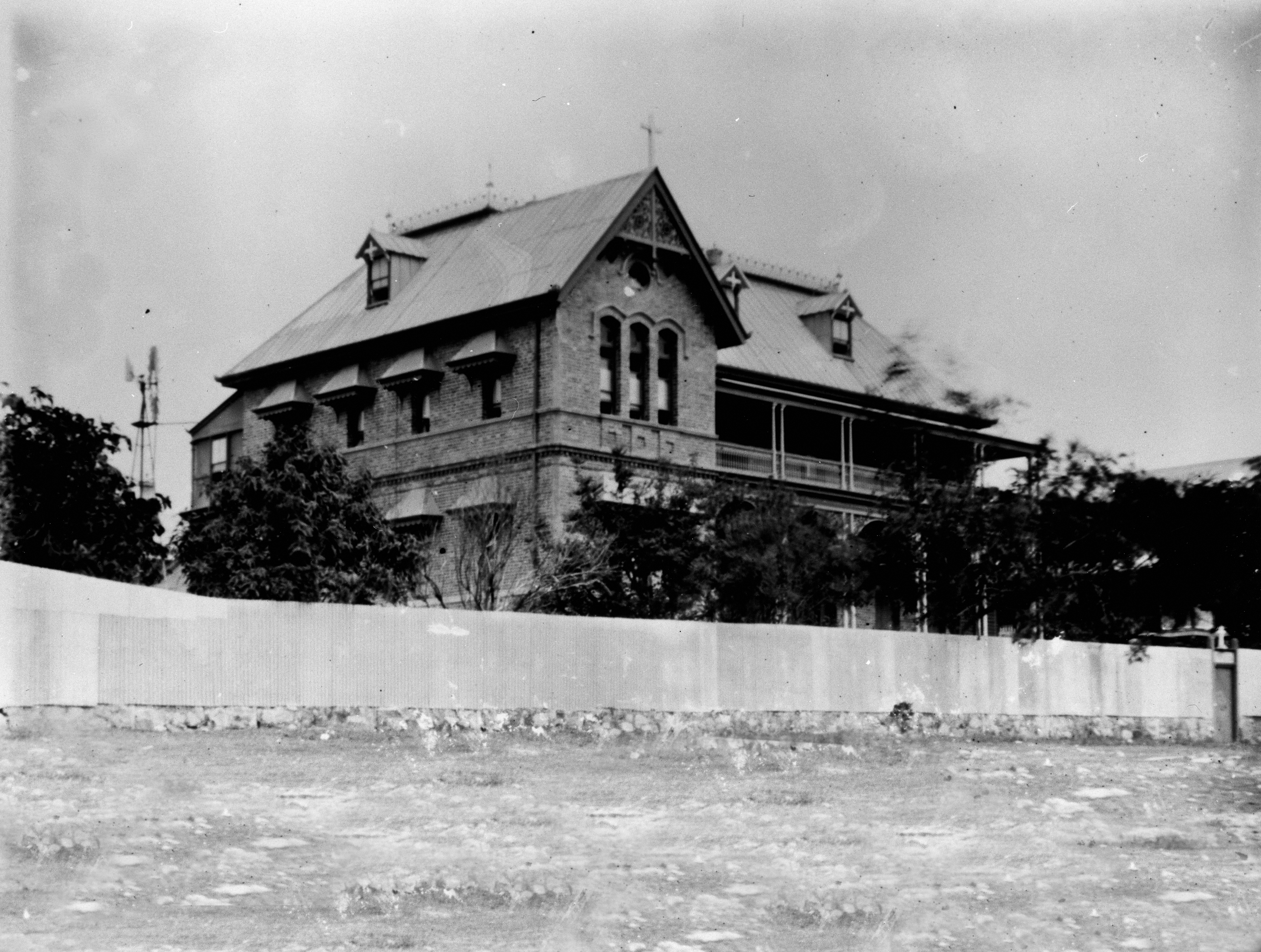
St Marys Convent at Cooktown

The former St Mary's Convent is sited on a hill overlooking the Endeavour River. It is constructed in red brick in a Victorian Gothic style. It has an L-shaped floor plan with a bay projecting to the west on its northern end. Brick cornices surround the building below the ground-floor- and first-floor-window levels and at first-floor level.

The roof has a steep pitch and is now clad in corrugated iron replacing the original ribbed pan. The roof finishes as a gable over the western bay and as a truncated hipped form at the southern end. The original decorative ridge cast-iron work and roof vents have been removed from the truncated section of roof. Later dormer windows have been installed with four along the east elevation, one on north side and two on the west elevation.

There are verandahs on the east and west elevation. The west or front verandah is supported on paired cast-iron Corinthian columns which divide it into five bays. Each bay is finished with arching decorative cast-iron brackets. The paired columns at first-floor level rise in Doric detailing to support the verandah roof. The rear or eastern verandah is infilled but retains its original detailing of single columns cast-iron first-floor balustrade and deep vertical timbered valance at ground-floor level.

The former single-storeyed hipped roof brick kitchen building remains to the rear on the north side; additions have been made adjacent to this to service the museum.

On the western bay there are three centrally positioned long, narrow windows at ground-floor and first-floor levels, and above these a round vent with hood mould. On the north elevation there are sets of four double-hung timber windows symmetrically positioned at the ground-floor and first-floor levels; these have window hoods with scalloped fascias.

The central timber doorway with side lights is accessed via a set of stone stairs from the western verandah. This doorway is flanked on each side by double-hung windows with shallow arched heads and hood moulds over.

The apex of the western gable roof has cast-iron panels fixed between a collar tie supported by decorative timber brackets and a king post running up to the roof and supporting a cross.

The central hall contains a fine timber staircase. Rooms of various dimension run off central corridors at ground and first-floor levels. The rooms in the northern end of the building provide large museum display space. Walls are plaster over brick and ceilings lath and plaster with moulded decorative cornices.

== Heritage listing ==
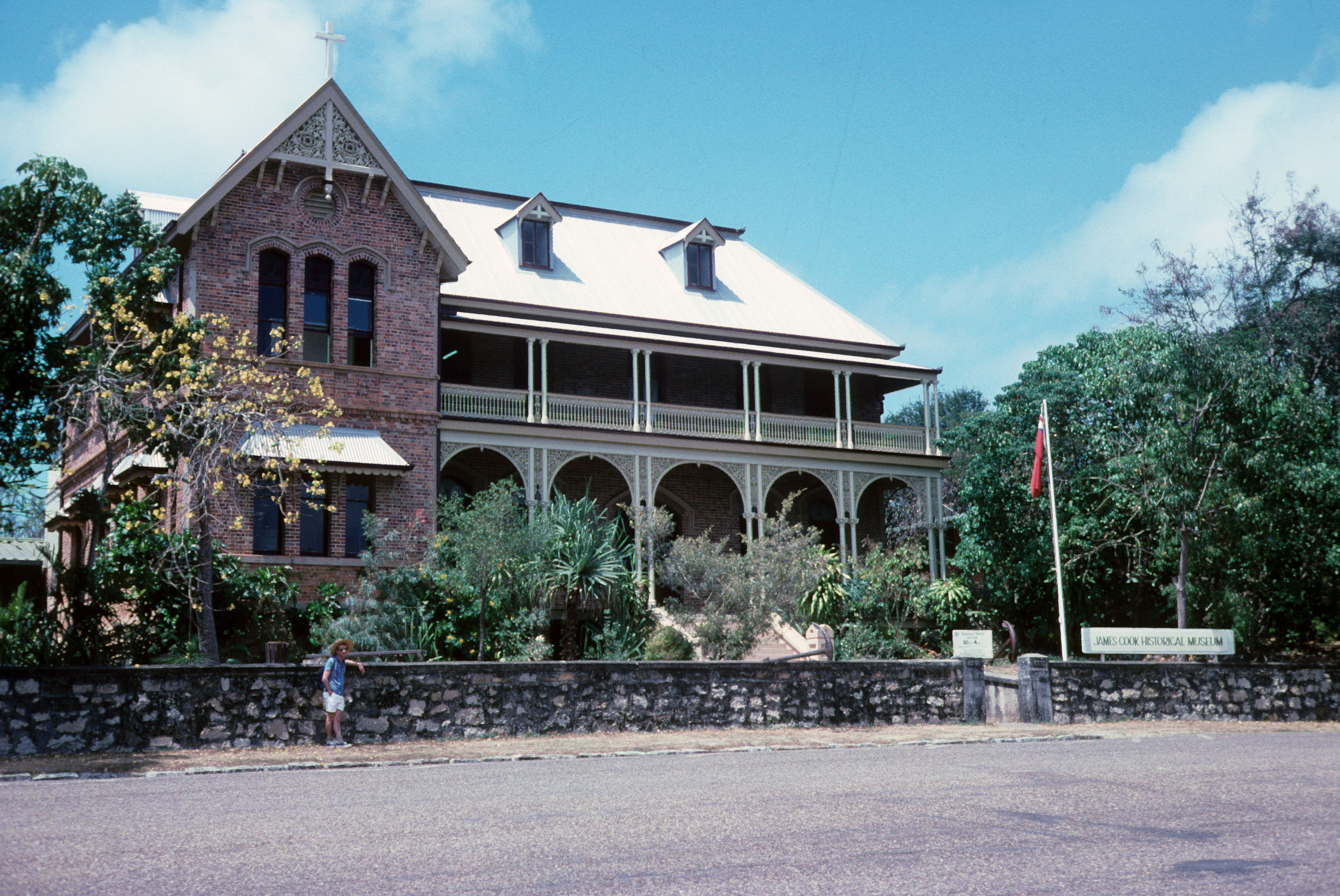
Cooktown Museum in 1989, when known as James Cook Historical Museum.

James Cook Historical Museum was listed on the Queensland Heritage Register on 21 October 1992 having satisfied the following criteria.

The place is important in demonstrating the evolution or pattern of Queensland's history.

The former St Mary's Convent and School, erected 1888–89, is important in demonstrating the evolution of Queensland's history, in particular the dramatic rise and fall of Cooktown as a port, supply and administrative centre to the Palmer River goldfields in the last quarter of the 19th century.

Its construction evidences the buoyant Cooktown economy of the late 1880s and survives as a highly evocative illustration of late 19th century confidence in the future of Cooktown as the principal port and town of far North Queensland. Construction of the convent and school also demonstrates the importance attached by the colonising culture to establishing (religious) education, considered a "civilising" influence in remote districts of Queensland during the frontier phase of our history.

The place demonstrates rare, uncommon or endangered aspects of Queensland's cultural heritage.

It is significant for its rarity value: few late 19th century buildings of this substance and decorative detail were erected in centres as remote as Cooktown, accessible only by sea in the 1880s.

The place is important in demonstrating the principal characteristics of a particular class of cultural places.

The former convent and school is an excellent, highly intact example of a substantial, 1880s boom era brick institutional building with decorative detailing, designed to accommodate the tropical Cooktown climate and to cater for both convent and school purposes.

The place is important because of its aesthetic significance.

The building is well maintained, retains its aesthetic appeal, and makes a significant contribution to the Cooktown townscape. Situated prominently on the ridge running south from Grassy Hill, the place is visible from the sea approach to the town, and has been considered a Cooktown landmark since its construction in the late 1880s.

The place has a strong or special association with a particular community or cultural group for social, cultural or spiritual reasons.

The place has a strong association for the people of Cooktown and district with the town's earlier prominence in Queensland's history. This was evidenced by the public outcry in the late 1960s when the Catholic Church called for the place to be demolished. As the James Cook Historical Museum, the place has become a major Cooktown tourist attraction.

The place has a special association with the life or work of a particular person, group or organisation of importance in Queensland's history.

The place has significant associations with the work of the Augustinian fathers, in particular Bishops Hutchinson and Murray, and the Sisters of Mercy, in the Vicariate Apostolic of Cooktown in the late 19th and early 20th centuries, and with the American military during the Second World War. Since 1970, it has had an important and close connection with the James Cook Historical Museum collection. The Joseph Banks Memorial Garden was established in the grounds of the former convent as a memorial to the work of botanist Joseph Banks and Dr Solander during their 7-week encampment at the Endeavour River in 1770.
