= Cooktown, Queensland =

Cooktown
- Town
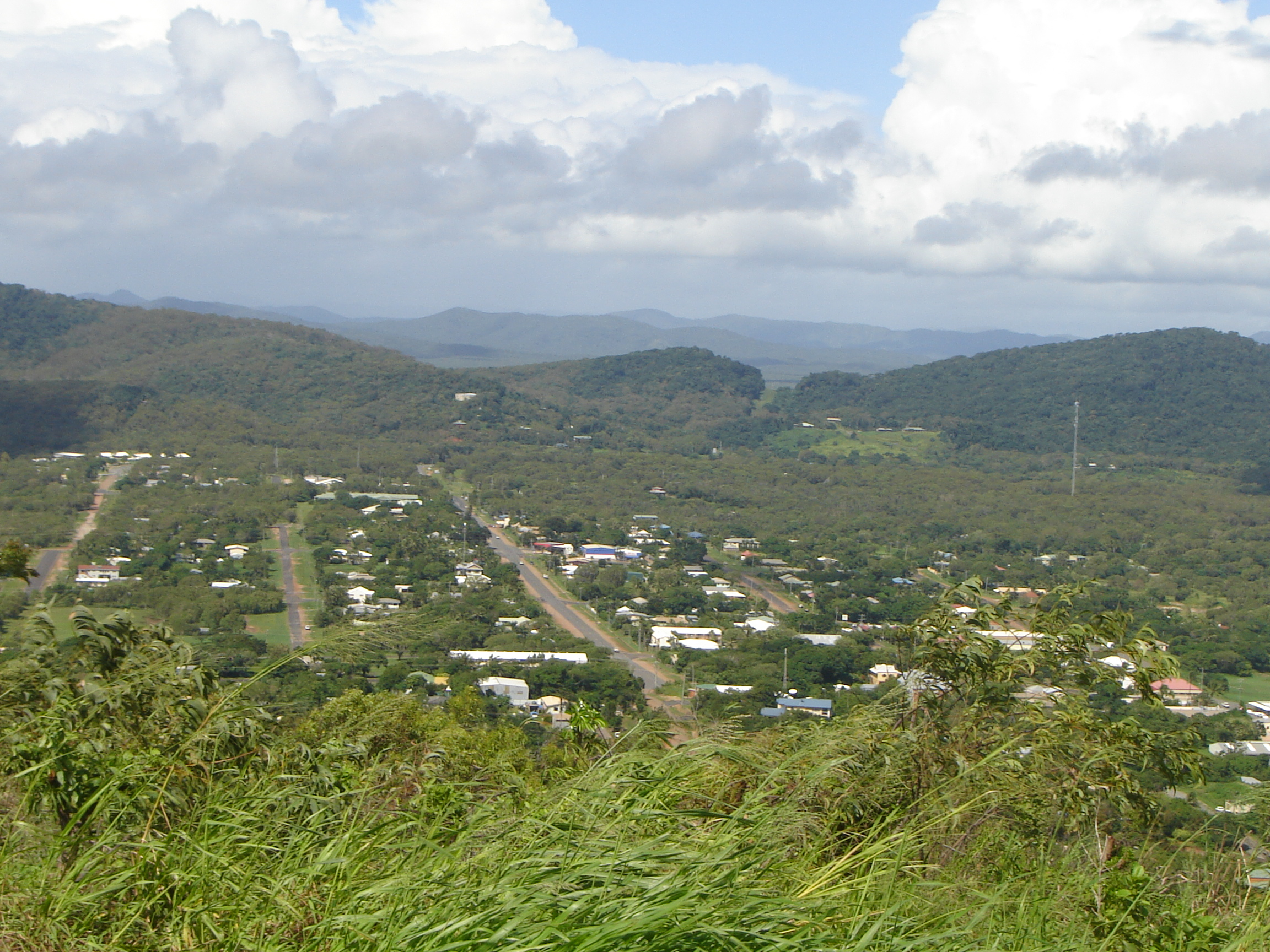
- View of Cooktown from Grassy Hill

- Interactive map of Cooktown
- Coordinates: 15.4722°S 145.2522°E
- Country: Australia
- State: Queensland
- LGA: Shire of Cook
- Location: 266 km (165 mi) N of Port Douglas; 326 km (203 mi) N of Cairns; 651 km (405 mi) SE of Weipa; 1,999 km (1,242 mi) NNW of Brisbane
- Established: 1873

Government
  - State electorate: Cook
  - Federal division: Leichhardt

Area
  - Total: 2,197.3 km^{2} (848.4 sq mi)
- Elevation: 6.0 m (19.7 ft)

Population
  - Total: 2,746 (2021 census)
  - Density: 1.24972/km^{2} (3.2367/sq mi)
- Time zone: UTC+10:00 (AEST)
- Postcode: 4895
- County: Banks
- Mean max temp: 31.5 °C (88.7 °F)
- Mean min temp: 24.3 °C (75.7 °F)
- Annual rainfall: 1,809.7 mm (71.25 in)
Localities around Cooktown
Starcke	Starcke	Hopevale
Lakefield	Cooktown	Coral Sea
Laura	Lakeland	Rossville

Cooktown is a coastal town and locality in the Shire of Cook, Queensland, Australia. Cooktown is at the mouth of the Endeavour River, on Cape York Peninsula in Far North Queensland where James Cook beached his ship, the Endeavour, for repairs in 1770. Both the town and Mount Cook (431 metres or 1,415 feet) which rises up behind the town were named after James Cook.

Cooktown is one of the few large towns in the Cape York Peninsula and was founded on 25 October 1873 as a supply port for the goldfields along the Palmer River. It was called "Cook's Town" until 1 June 1874.

In the 2021 census, the locality of Cooktown had a population of 2,746 people.

== Geography ==
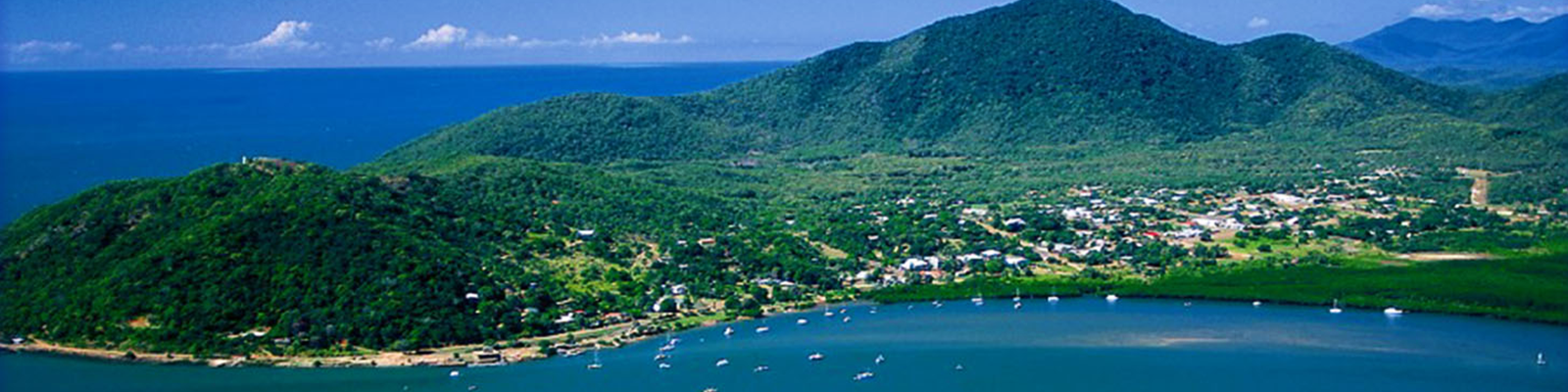
View of Cooktown from the Coral Sea, 2025

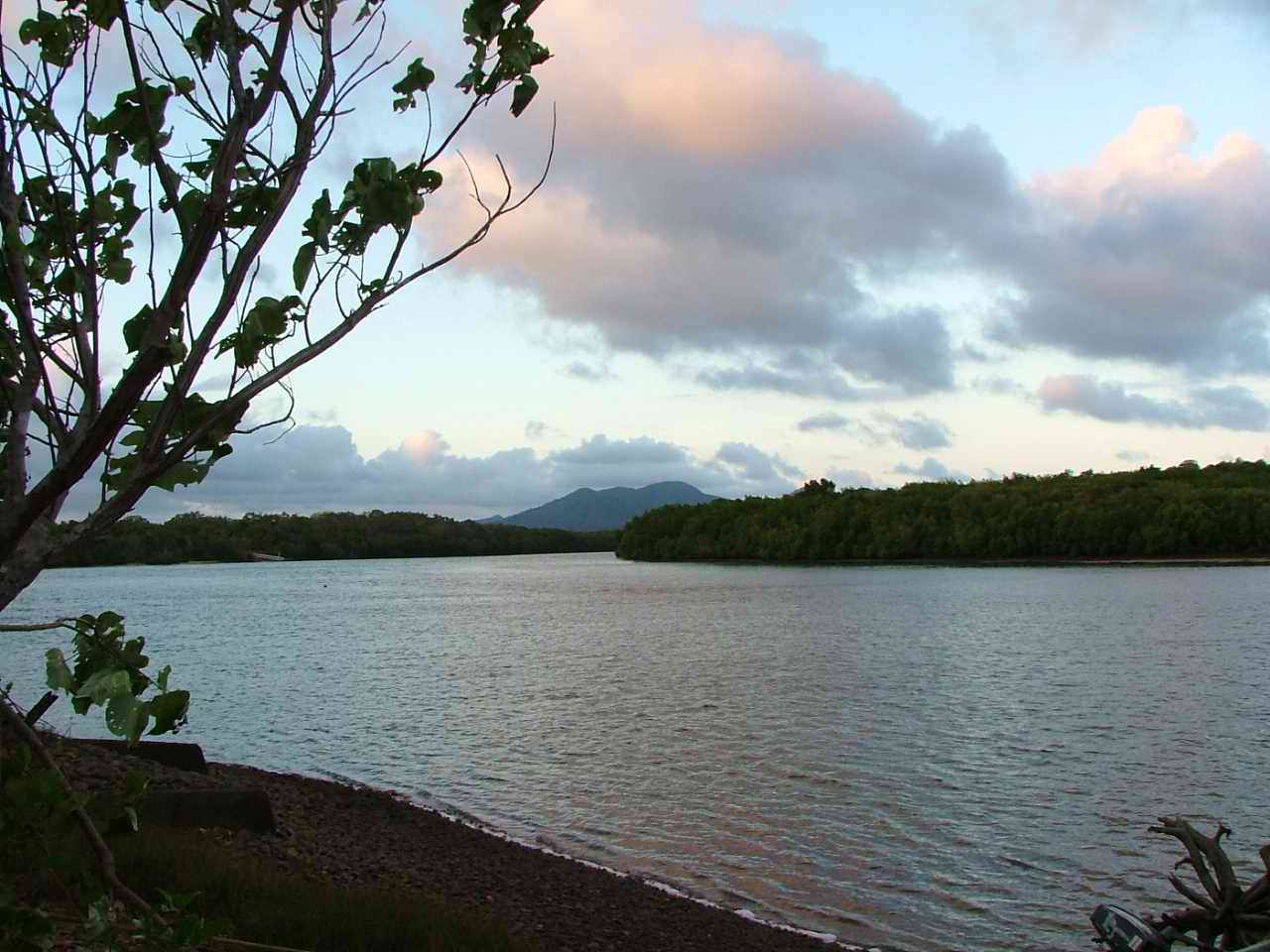
Endeavour River

Cooktown is at the mouth of the Endeavour River, where it enters the Coral Sea on Cape York Peninsula in Far North Queensland where James Cook beached his ship, the Endeavour, for repairs in 1770. The town was named after Cook.

The rugged Mount Cook (431 metres (1,414 ft)) was named by Phillip Parker King on 27 June 1818, after James Cook. It forms a backdrop to the town and is now part of the Mount Cook National Park.

The area around Cooktown is unusually rich in biodiversity, being close to three major ecozones. Hence, it contains a large proportion of the 3,000 plant species, and the more than 500 terrestrial vertebrates, recorded on Cape York Peninsula. The region contains many rare or unusual species that are of great interest to botanists and zoologists.

== History ==
=== Aboriginal history ===
Guugu Yimithirr (also known as Koko Yindjir, Gugu Yimidhirr, Guguyimidjir) is an Australian Aboriginal language of Hope Vale and the Cooktown area. The language region includes the local government area of the Aboriginal Shire of Hope Vale and the Shire of Cook, particularly the localities of Cape Bedford, Battle Camp and sections of the Normanby River and Annan River.

In the local Guugu Yimithirr language the name for the region is Gangaar Aboriginal pronunciation: [ɡ̊anˈɡaːr], which means "(Place of the) Rock Crystals". Quartz crystals were used in various Aboriginal ceremonies across the continent and are found in the vicinity; they were traded from the Cooktown region at least as far as 300 kilometres (190 mi) south.

Yalanji (also known as Kuku Yalanji, Kuku Yalaja, Kuku Yelandji, and Gugu Yalanji) is an Australian Aboriginal language of Far North Queensland. The traditional language region is Mossman River in the south to the Annan River in the north, bordered by the Pacific Ocean in the east and extending inland to west of Mount Mulgrave. This includes the local government boundaries of the Shire of Douglas, the Shire of Cook and the Aboriginal Shire of Wujal Wujal and the towns and localities of Cooktown, Mossman, Daintree, Cape Tribulation and Wujal Wujal. It includes the head of the Palmer River, the Bloomfield River, China Camp, Maytown, and Palmerville.

=== Arrival of Captain Cook ===
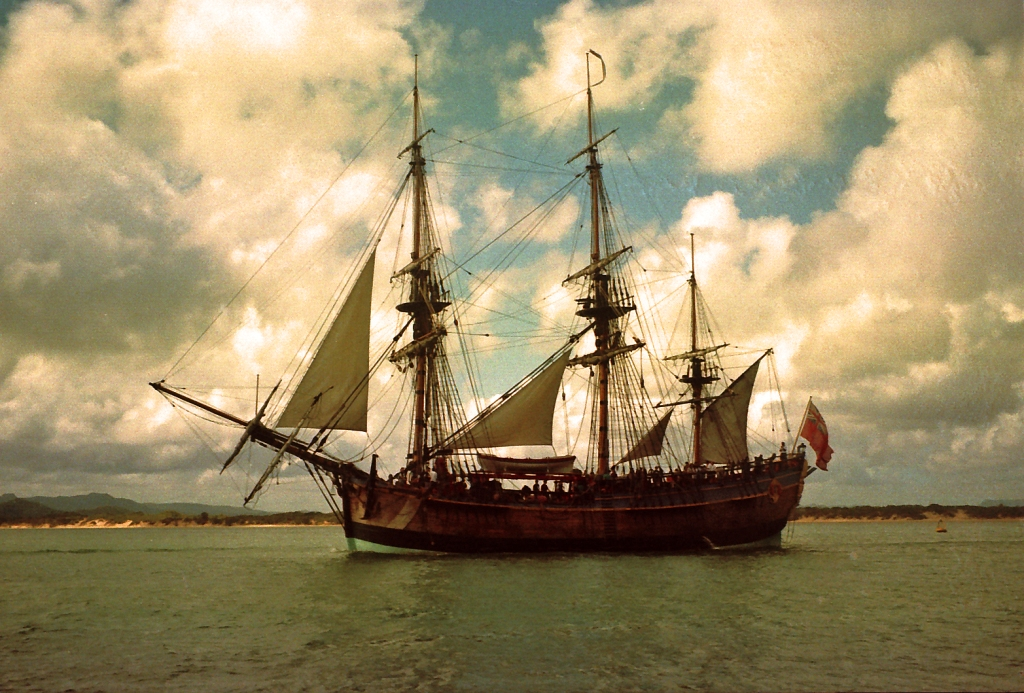
Endeavour replica sailing into Cooktown's harbour near the mouth of the Endeavour River where the original Endeavour was beached for 7 weeks in 1770.

The site of modern Cooktown was the meeting place of two vastly different cultures when, in June 1770, the local Aboriginal Guugu Yimithirr tribe cautiously watched the crippled sailing ship – His Majesty's Bark Endeavour – limp up the coast seeking a safe harbour after sustaining serious damage to its wooden hull on the Endeavour Reef, south of Cooktown. The Guugu Yimithirr people saw the Endeavour beach in the calm waters near the mouth of their river, which they called "Wahalumbaal".

The captain of the Endeavour, Lieutenant James Cook, wrote: "... it was happy for us that a place of refuge was at hand; for we soon found that the ship would not work, and it is remarkable that in the whole course of our voyage we had seen no place that our present circumstances could have afforded us the same relief".

The Endeavour crew spent seven weeks on the site of present-day Cooktown, repairing their ship, replenishing food and water supplies, and caring for their sick.

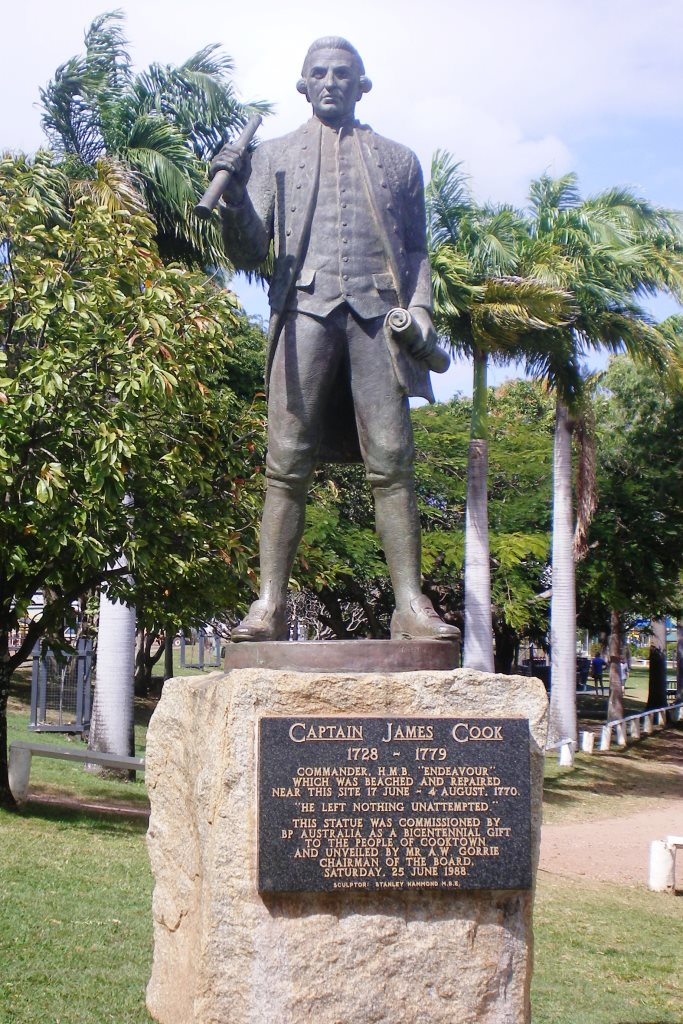
Captain James Cook Commander, H.M.B. "Endeavour" which was beached and repaired near this site 17 June – 4 August 1770

The scientist Joseph Banks and Swedish naturalist Daniel Solander, who accompanied Cook on the expedition, took advantage of the 7-week stay to collect, preserve and document over 200 new species of plants, which formed the vast majority of the collection brought back to England from Australia. The young artist Sydney Parkinson illustrated the specimens and he was the first British artist to portray Aboriginal people from direct observation. The illustrations were later published as the famous Banks' Florilegium.

After some weeks, Joseph Banks met and spoke with the local people, recording about 50 Guugu Yimithirr words, including the name of the intriguing animal the natives called gangurru (which he transcribed as "Kangaru"). Cook recorded the local name as "Kangooroo, or Kanguru".

The first recorded sighting of kangaroos by Europeans was on Grassy Hill, which rises above the place where the ship was beached. Cook climbed this hill to work out a safe passage for the Endeavour to sail through the surrounding reefs, after it was repaired.

"The visit on the 19th of July 1770 ended in a skirmish after Cook refused to share the turtles he kept on the Endeavour with the local inhabitants. They set fire to the grass around Cook’s camp twice, burning the area and killing a suckling pig. After Cook wounded one of the men with a musket, they ran away. Cook, Banks and some others followed them and caught up with them on a rocky bar near Furneaux Street, which is now known as Reconciliation Rocks. A "little old man" appeared from the group of Indigenous Australians and they were reconciled. This was an important historic event as it is believed that this is the first recorded reconciliation between Europeans and Indigenous Australians ever".

Cook named the river the "Endeavour" after his ship, and, as they sailed north, he hoisted the flag known as the "Queen Anne Jack" and claimed possession of the whole eastern coast of Australia for Britain. He named Cape York Peninsula after the then-Duke of York and Albany ("The Grand Old Duke of York").

"In 1886 the people of Cooktown were anxious to recover the brass guns of the Endeavour which were thrown overboard, in order to place them as a memento in their town; but they could not be found, which is not altogether surprising."

In 1969 an American-sponsored expedition discovered six of Cook's iron cannons, as well as iron ballast from his ship using a magnetometer. These artifacts are now in various museums around the world.

=== Expedition of Phillip Parker King ===
The next recorded European expedition to the area was in 1819, when Captain Phillip Parker King on board HMS Mermaid, visited the Endeavour River during his surveying voyage around Australia. They camped for two weeks at the mouth of the river in order to construct a new dinghy, and had mostly friendly interactions with the local Aboriginal people until an argument occurred over the possession of clothes. Spears and musket-fire were exchanged but no injuries were sustained. A botanist, Allan Cunningham, accompanied King on this journey and collected numerous botanical specimens for the British Museum and Kew Gardens. King returned again to the region in 1820 as part of the same surveying expedition and this time collated a small record of the local Aboriginal language. He established that Captain Cook was incorrect in the interpretation of the word kangaroo, with King noting that menuah was the local name for the large macropod. Large outrigger canoes made by the resident Aboriginal people were also noted.

=== Port for the Palmer River Goldfields ===
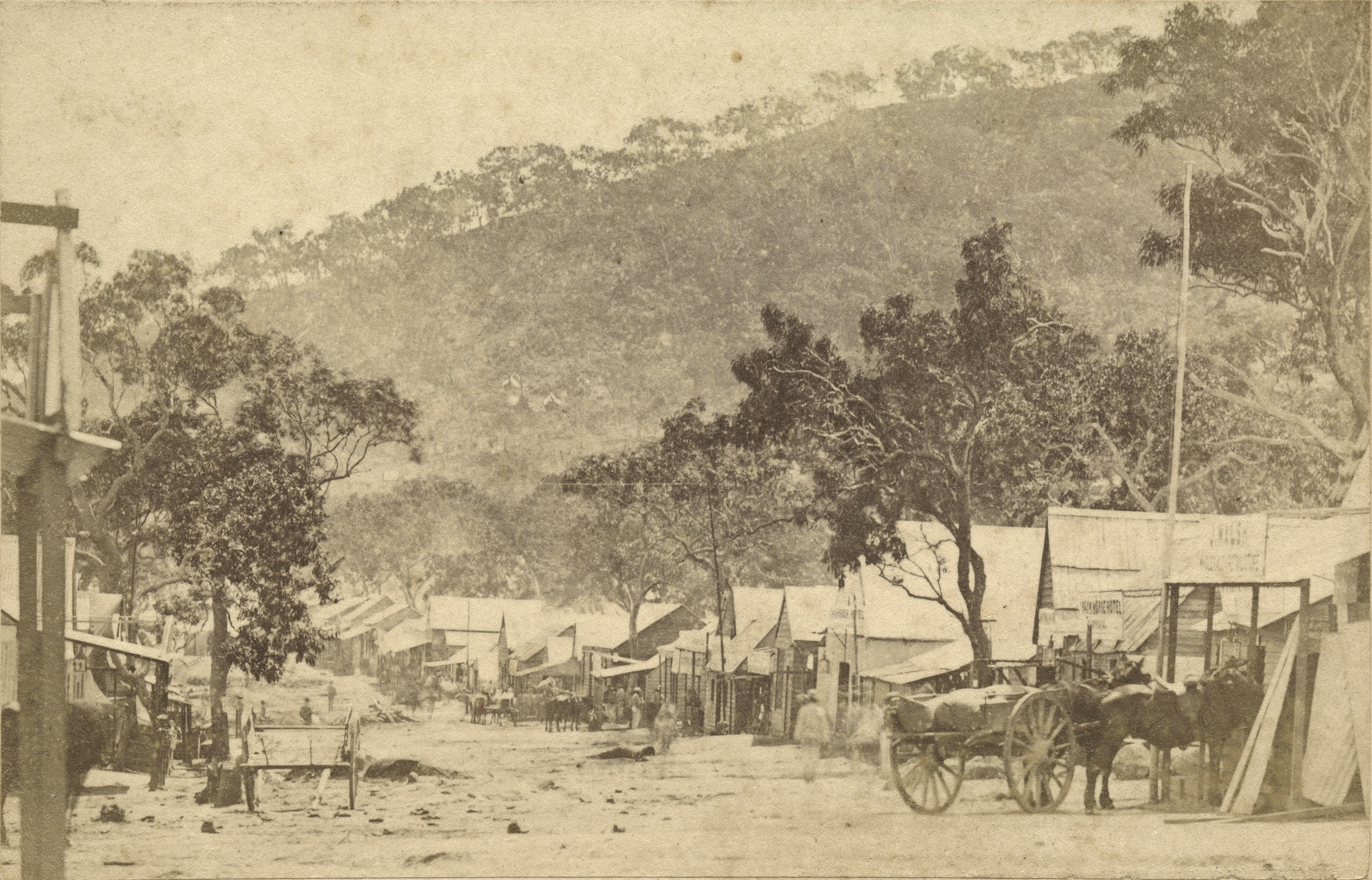
Cooktown during the gold rush, 1874

In 1872, William Hann discovered gold in the Palmer River, about 200 kilometres (120 mi) inland from the Endeavour River. His findings were reported to James Venture Mulligan who led an expedition to the Palmer River in 1873. Mulligan's expedition found quantities of alluvial gold and thus began the gold rush that was to bring prospectors from all over the world. The Queensland government responded quickly to Mulligan's reports, and dispatched Archibald Campbell MacMillan to lead a party in establishing a port on the Endeavour River and a road from there to the goldfields. MacMillan arrived at the river on 25 October 1873 on board the vessel Leichhardt with an entourage of around seventy other government men and prospectors. A new township was immediately established on the southern bank of the river which was later officially gazetted under the name of Cooktown. A local Aboriginal man who took a surveying flag while the area was being initially charted was shot at with a barrage of gunfire from both colonists aboard the Leichhardt and from Native Police under the command of Robert Arthur Johnstone. The man managed to survive unharmed.

MacMillan soon after led an expedition of 110 diggers, police and officials to blaze a trail from Cooktown to the Palmer River Goldfields. They "shot a lot" and "hunted" Aboriginal people along the way at the Normanby River, Kennedy River, Kavanaugh Creek, St George River and at Battle Camp. At Battle Camp, a large group of Aboriginal men approached MacMillan's camp yelling a war cry, but were forced back by gunfire, some of whom fell. The expedition members then pursued them to a lagoon where many more were shot. Two Aboriginal women and three children were brought back to the camp by the diggers after one of the shootings, where they had in their possession a number of items from a digger who was supposed killed. A later government enquiry into the events found that the expedition members had acted in self defence and were justified in their actions.

The Palmer River Goldfields and its centre, Maytown grew quickly, the recorded output of gold from 1873 to 1890 was over 500,000 ounces (14,000 kg). Cooktown was the port through which this gold was exported and supplies for the goldfields brought in. Word of the gold quickly spread, and Cooktown was soon thriving, as prospectors arrived from around the world. Cooktown Post Office opened on 1 January 1874.

=== Township of Cooktown ===
Population estimates vary widely, but there were probably around 7,000 people in the area and about 4,000 permanent residents in the town by 1880. At that time, Cooktown boasted a large number of hotels and guest houses. There were 47 licensed pubs within the town boundaries in 1874 although this number had dropped to 27 by the beginning of 1880. There were also a number of illegal grog shops and several brothels. There were bakeries, a brewery and a soft drinks factory, dressmakers and milliners, a brickworks, a cabinetmaker, and two newspapers.

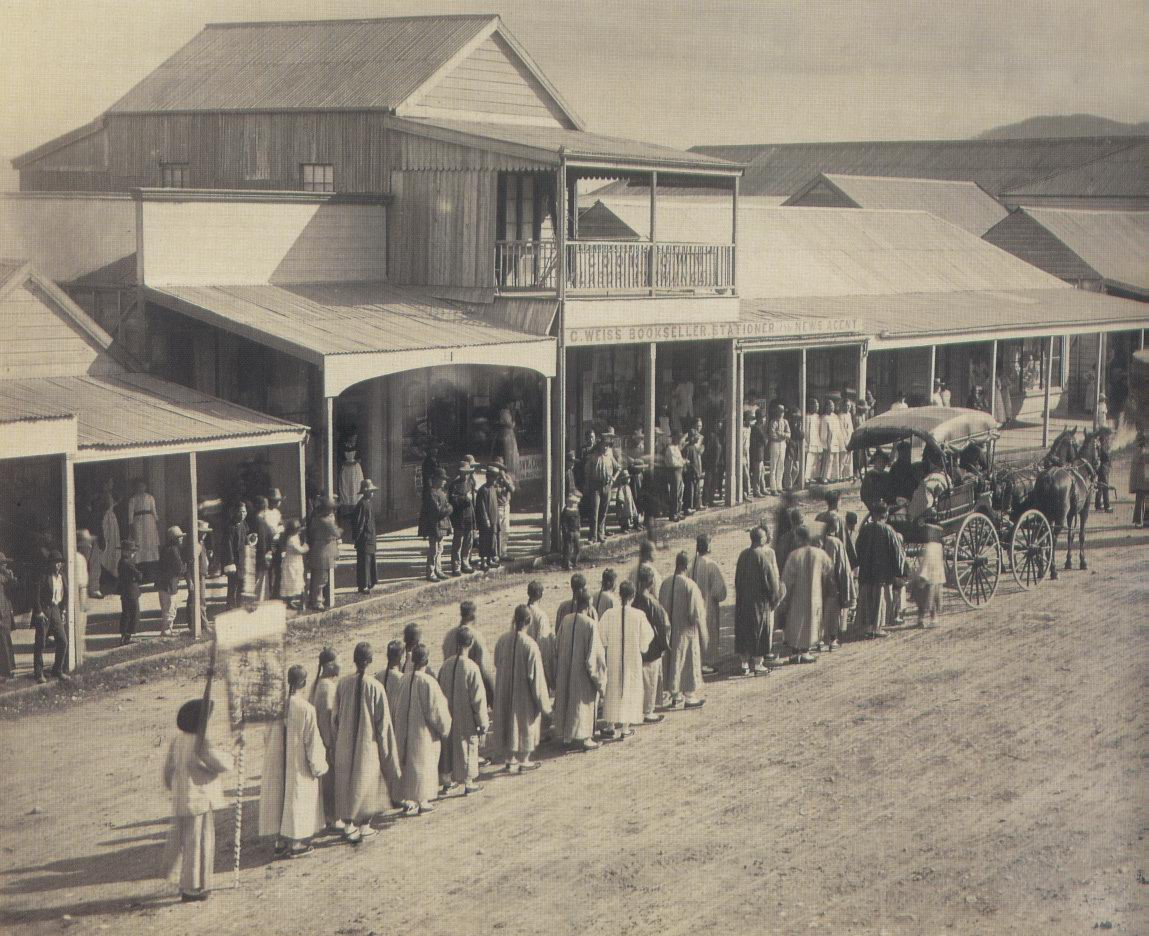
A visit of Chinese Commissioners to Cooktown in 1887.

The port of Cooktown served the nearby goldfields and, during the goldrush of the 1870s, a Chinese community many thousands strong grew up in the goldfields and in the town itself. The Chinese played an important role in the early days of Cooktown. They came originally as prospectors, but many established market gardens, supplying the town and the goldfields with fruit, vegetables and rice, while others opened shops.

However, largely through cultural misunderstandings, conflict broke out between the Aboriginal people and the new settlers, and the diggers. The Cooktown Herald, 8 December 1875, reported: "The natives wholly ignorant of the terrible firepower of fire-arms, and confiding in their numbers, showed a ferocity and daring wholly unexpected and unsurpassed. Grasping the very muzzles of the rifles they attempted to wrest them from the hands of the whites, standing to be shot down, rather than yield an inch...." It was an unequal struggle. Whole tribes were wiped out as European settlement spread over Cape York Peninsula.

In 1887, a Chinese Investigation Commission to South-East Asia arrived in Cooktown from Canton to investigate the social conditions of Chinese living in the colonies and to establish consulates in them. The visit went well, General Wong Yung Ho was pleased with what they had found, and cheers were exchanged between the Commission members and local residents as they left on 7 August 1887.

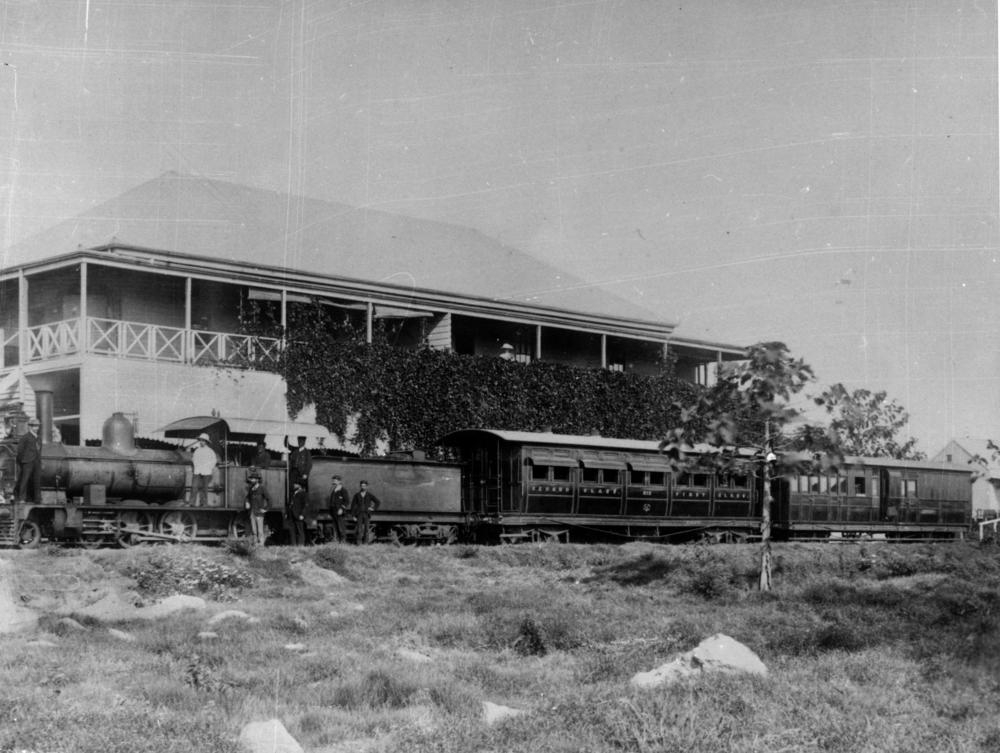
Locomotive at the Cooktown Railway Station, ca 1889

Transport was an ongoing problem for the new settlers. Getting supplies and people to the goldfields often took three weeks. After every wet season the tracks and bridges had to be remade. A railway line from Cooktown to Maytown, was planned, but it took five years to get the 67 miles (108 km) to Laura – and that is where it stopped. By that time the gold was petering out, so the Queensland Government refused further funding for the venture.

In spite of this, the train proved to be a lifeline for the Peninsula people connecting the hinterland to Cooktown, from where one could catch a boat to Cairns and other southern ports. The line was closed in 1961 after the Peninsula Development Road was built connecting Cooktown and other Peninsula communities with Cairns and the Atherton Tableland to the south.

The Cooktown Parish of the Roman Catholic Church was established in 1874 with the Cooktown becoming the seat of the Vicariate Apostolic of Cooktown in 1877 (which became the Diocese of Cairns in 1941).

Cooktown State School opened on 25 January 1875. On 19 January 1885, it was split into Cooktown Boys State School and Cooktown Girls and Infants State School. In January 1921, the two schools were amalgamated to become Cooktown State School again.

Cooktown's magnificent Botanic Garden of 62 hectares (150 acres) was established near the town in 1878. Much work was done in the early stages – with wells sunk, water reticulated, garden beds enclosed, stone-lined paths, stone-pitched pools and footbridges made, and lawns, trees and shrubs planted. Although the gardens fell into disrepair, in recent years they have been expanded and are a popular destination for botanists and nature lovers. Most of the early stonework has been restored, and beautiful walking tracks lead the visitor through the Botanic Garden to the magnificent beaches at Finch Bay and Cherry Tree Bay.

In 1881, a bridge over the Endeavour River was completed, which opened up the richer pastoral lands of the Endeavour and McIvor River valleys. Tin was found in the Annan River area, south of Cooktown, in 1884.

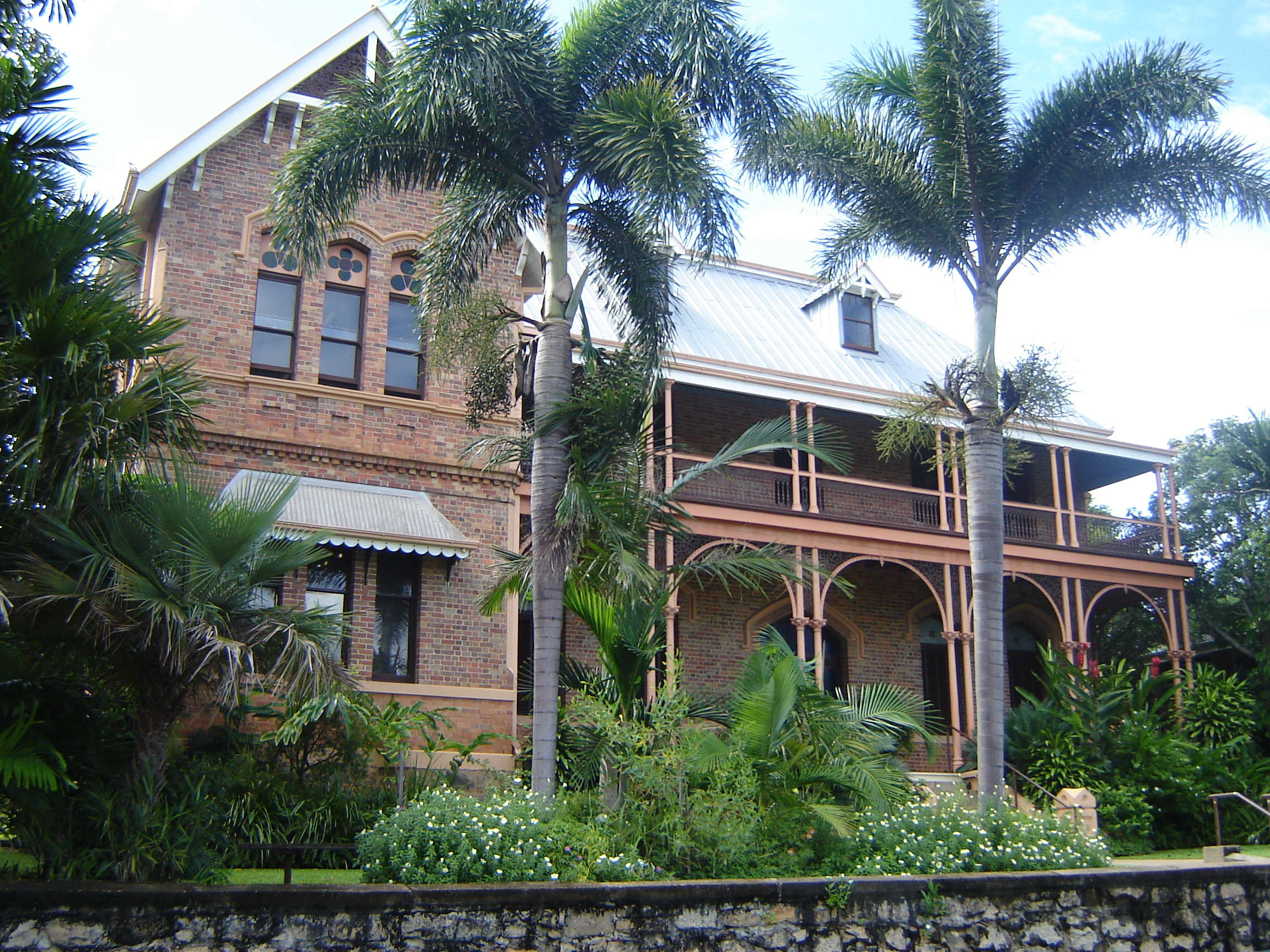
James Cook Historical Museum, 2006

In 1886, Lutheran missionaries came to Cooktown to establish a secure place for the Aboriginal people who were living in abominable conditions on the edge of the town. Missions were established at Elim on the beach (later they moved inland to Hopevale), and Wujal Wujal, near the mouth of the Bloomfield River. Also in 1888, five Irish nuns from the Sisters of Mercy Order arrived in Cooktown and established a Catholic convent school. The original building is now used as the Cooktown Museum (formerly the James Cook Historical Museum).

In 1893 the town was described as follows:

"Cooktown, which now stands on the Endeavour River, is a thriving place, and the northernmost town on this coast. It has some 2000 inhabitants, and is the port for a gold mining district. A deeper channel has now been dredged over the bar that gave Cook so much trouble, but it is not a harbour that will admit large vessels."

With the gold rush over, the number of people living in the area started dwindling. Two major fires struck Cooktown – in 1875 and, again, in 1919 when whole blocks of buildings in the main street were burned to the ground. A major cyclone in 1907 added to the destruction.

In February 1908, a new St Mary's Catholic Church was opened and dedicated by Bishop Murray to replace the one destroyed in the cyclone.

=== World War II ===
By 1940, little evidence of Cooktown or Maytown's interesting past remained. During the Second World War, Cooktown became an important base for the war effort. The civilian population of Cooktown was encouraged to evacuate in face of the Japanese advances and by 1942 the vast majority had left. The Aboriginal people of the Lutheran missions at Hope Vale and Bloomfield were forcibly removed – most being taken south to Woorabinda in May, 1942, while some of the elderly people were sent to Palm Island. The senior missionary, Pastor Schwartz (known as Muni to the local people), was arrested and placed in internment, suspected of being an enemy sympathiser. The Aboriginal people were not allowed to return to their homelands until 1949. Many Aboriginal people died when moved from their traditional lands, and many Aboriginal and white families never returned from their exile.

In October 1942 detachments of 16 Australian Field Company, Royal Australian Engineers travelled to Cooktown, Mount Surprise and Coen to build Repeater Huts. Some 20,000 Australian and American troops were stationed in and around the town. The busy airfield played a key role in the crucial Battle of the Coral Sea when Japanese expansion towards the Australian mainland was finally halted. The last military unit, the 27th Operational Base Squadron of the RAAF, ceased operations in Cooktown in April 1946.

=== Since World War II ===
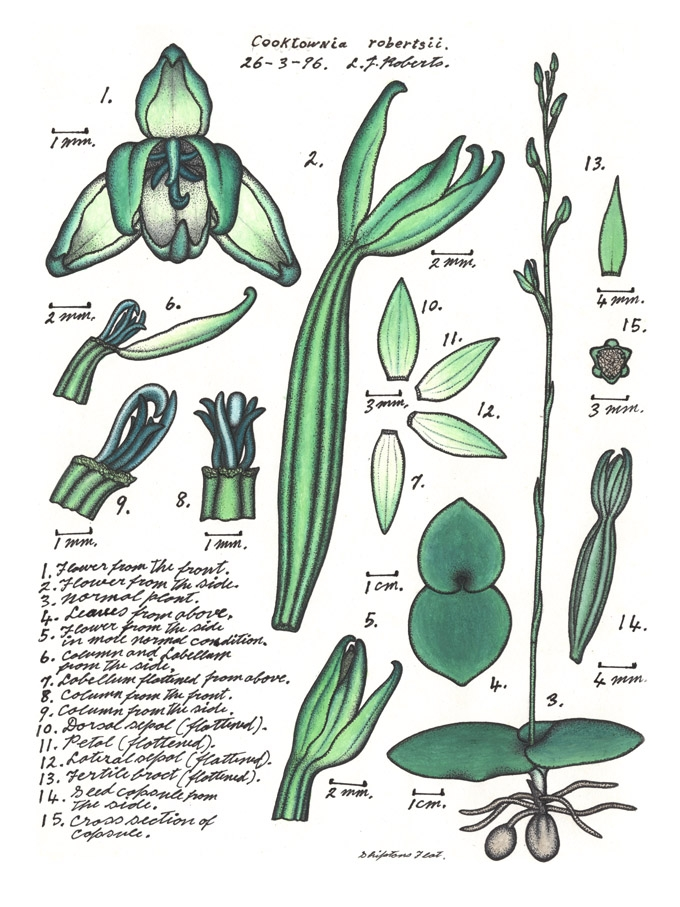
The Mystery Orchid, Cooktownia robertsii, first recorded and also illustrated by Lewis Roberts (naturalist), and named after both him and Cooktown

In 1949, another cyclone devastated the town, and Cooktown's population declined further.

With the closure of the rail link to Laura in 1961 and the "Peninsula Development Road" opened up to the south, the population declined to just a few hundred people before it gradually began to climb again.

Since then, Cooktown and the Endeavour River Valley area have become a major attraction to biologists and illustrators of plants and animals. Vera Scarth-Johnson (1912–1999), spent almost thirty years (1972 to 1999) illustrating the flowering plants of the region and then gave her collection to the people of Cooktown. Following her wishes, a beautiful gallery and nature interpretive centre was built in the Cooktown Botanic Gardens to house her collection and promote the study and appreciation of the flora and fauna of the area, which she named "Nature's Powerhouse."

The Cooktown Public Library opened in 1995 and underwent a major refurbishment in 2013 and a minor refurbishment in 2015.

=== 21st century ===
Endeavour Christian College opened in 2012 to provide an alternative Christian school.

In 2015, the Roman Catholic Diocese of Cairns opened the Holy Spirit College as a secondary school for disengaged and marginalised young people. It has with two campuses, one in Cooktown and one in Cairns. The school draws students from a wide area. The Cooktown campus includes a 32-bed boarding facility to offer weekly boarding so that students can return to their families and communities on the weekends.

== Demographics ==
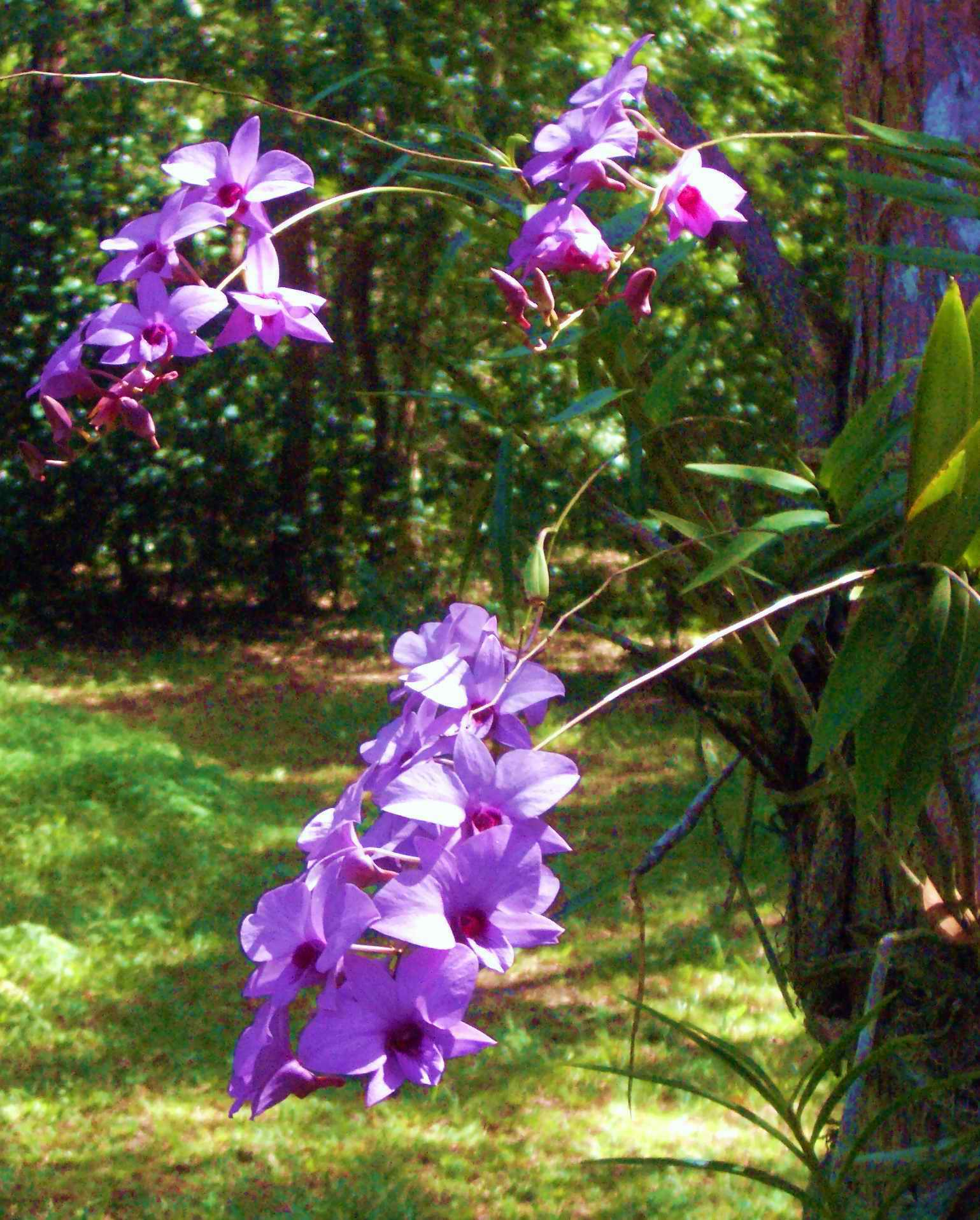
Cooktown orchids.

In the 2016 census, the locality of Cooktown had a population of 2,631 people. Aboriginal and Torres Strait Islander people made up 14.5% of the population. 69.9% of people were born in Australia and 78.4% of people spoke only English at home. The most common response for religion was No Religion at 31.5%.

In the 2021 census, the locality of Cooktown had a population of 2,746 people.

== Economy ==
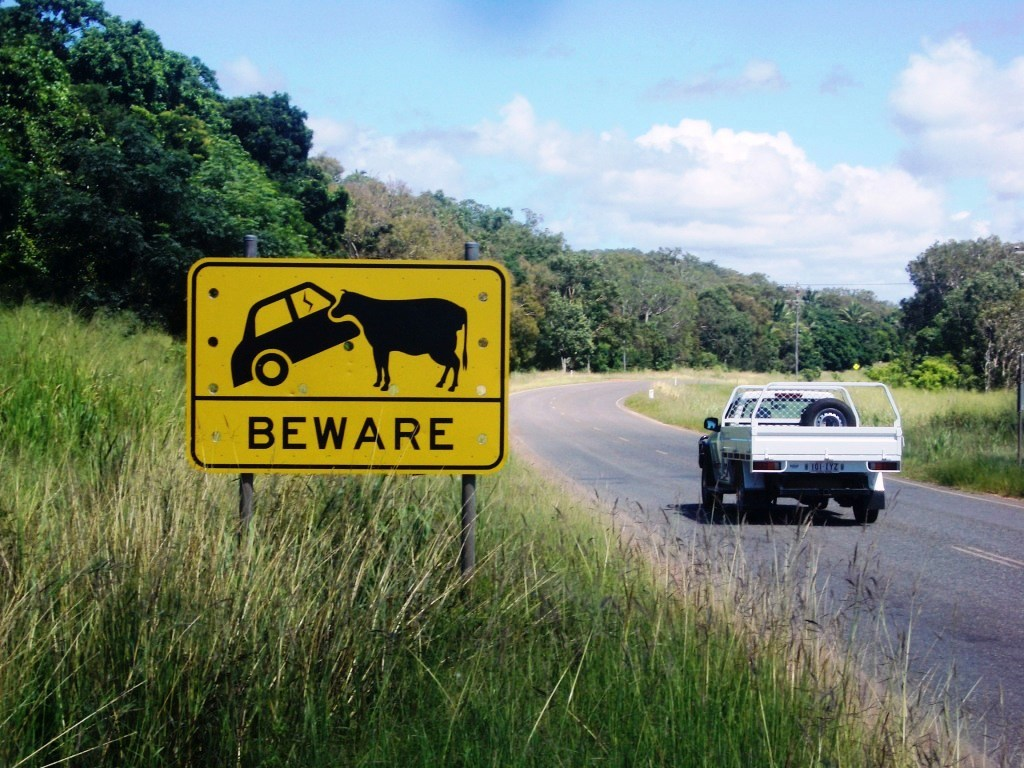
BEWARE sign near Cooktown, Cape York Peninsula

Cooktown has become a popular tourist destination. The paving of the Mulligan Highway now provides all-weather access by road for the first time. There are two flights a day connecting Cooktown with Cairns.

The Port of Cooktown is around the mouth of the Endeavour River, offshore from the town (15.4593°S 145.2499°E). It mostly serves cruise ships and tourist vessels. It is operated by Ports North, based in Cairns.

Cooktown is a service centre for the district including the Aboriginal communities of Hope Vale, 47 kilometres (29 mi) to the northwest, and Wujal Wujal, 72 kilometres (45 mi) to the south.

== Heritage listings ==
Cooktown has a number of heritage-listed sites, including:

- Early Granite Kerbing and Channelling, Adelaide, Charlotte, Furneaux, Green, Helen, Hogg, Hope and Walker Streets and Webber Esplanade
- Westpac Bank Building, 120 Charlotte Street (15.4672°S 145.2499°E)
- Cook Shire Council Chambers (now Cooktown History Centre), 121 Charlotte Street
- Seagren's Building, 124 Charlotte Street
- Ferrari Estates Building, 126 Charlotte Street
- Cooks Monument and Reserve, Charlotte Street
- Cooktown Cemetery, Charlotte Street (15.4759°S 145.2411°E)
- Mary Watson's Monument, Charlotte Street (15.4662°S 145.2496°E)
- Gallop Botanic Reserve, incorporating Cooktown Botanic Gardens, Finch Bay Road
- Cooktown Museum (formerly James Cook Historical Museum), Furneaux Street
- Grassy Hill Light, Grassy Hill
- Cook Shire Hall, Helen Street:
- Old Cooktown Hospital (now Jehovah's Witness Kingdom Hall), May Street
- Cooktown Powder Magazine, Webber Esplanade

== Education ==
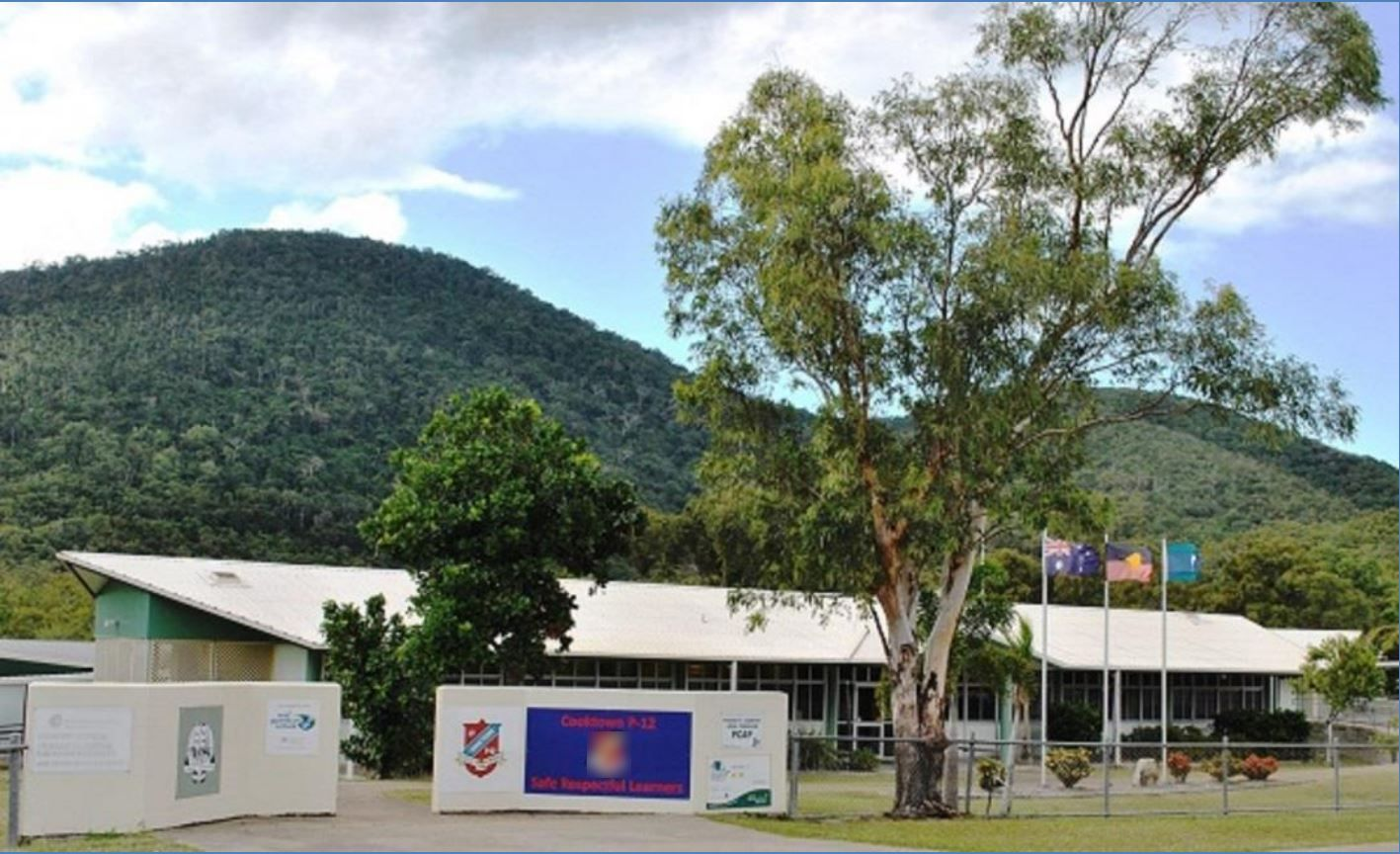
Cooktown State School, 2019

Cooktown State School is a government primary and secondary (Prep–12) school for boys and girls at 10 Charles Streets (corner May Street, 15.4820°S 145.2507°E). In 2018, the school had an enrolment of 394 students with 40 teachers (39 full-time equivalent) and 33 non-teaching staff (20 full-time equivalent) including students from Rossville and Lakeland. It includes a special education program.

Endeavour Christian College is a private primary and secondary (Prep–12) school for boys and girls at 12 Charles Street (15.4822°S 145.2549°E). In 2018, the school had an enrolment of 126 students with 16 teachers (13 full-time equivalent) and 10 non-teaching staff (7 full-time equivalent).

Holy Spirit College is a Catholic secondary (7–12) school for boys and girls at 1 Burkitt Street (corner of Hope Street, 15.4825°S 145.2484°E). In 2018, the school had an enrolment of 85 students with 11 teachers (10 full-time equivalent) and 17 non-teaching staff (16 full-time equivalent).

== Media ==
Radio stations that broadcast to the town are ABC Far North, Star 102.7, Triple M (formerly Sea FM), and Black Star Radio, a community based station which broadcast from the town.

Cooktown is served by five television stations, three commercial television stations (WIN Television, Seven Queensland and Network 10) which are regional affiliates of the three Australian commercial television networks (10, Seven and Nine), and public broadcasters the ABC and SBS services.

Local newspapers is served by the Cape York Weekly and The Express Newspaper which both cover the town.

== Amenities ==
The Cook Shire Council operates a public library at 33 Helen Street.

The Cooktown branch of the Queensland Country Women's Association meets at 107 Charlotte Street.

There is a Police-Citizens Youth Club (PCYC) at 3 May Street in Cooktown with amenities including a gymnasium and function rooms.

St Mary's Catholic Church is at 8 Furneaux Street. It is within the Cooktown Parish of the Roman Catholic Diocese of Cairns.

Cooktown has a bowling green, swimming pool, golf, tennis and turf clubs, historic cemetery, Chinese shrine, Cooktown Museum, Botanic Gardens with walks through to the beaches, the heritage-listed Grassy Hill lighthouse, and a new $3 million Events Centre next to the Cooktown State School, built to double as an emergency cyclone shelter for Cooktown.

The Information Centre and an Environment Display are in Nature's Powerhouse in the Cooktown Botanic Garden.

There is an active Aboriginal Community Centre on the main street called Gungarde (from the original Guugu Yimithirr name for the region).

== Events ==
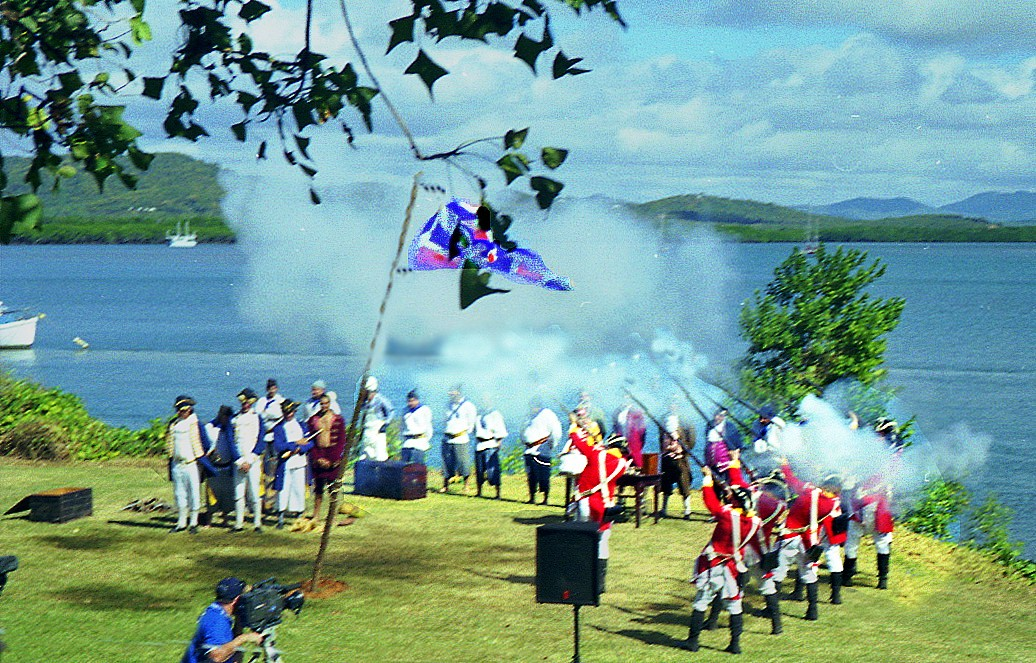
Annual re-enactment of James Cook's visit. Cooktown, Queensland.

The Cooktown Re-enactment Association started performing a re-enactment of Cook's 1770 landing in 1959 and have continued the tradition each year, with many of the local Guugu Yimithirr people as enthusiastic supporters. They celebrate the first act of reconciliation between Indigenous and non-Indigenous people, based on the incident recounted above, when a Guugu Yimithirr elder (the "little old man") stepped in after some of his men had violated custom by taking green turtles from the river and not sharing with the local people, presenting Cook with a broken-tipped spear as a peace offering and thus preventing possible bloodshed. Cook recorded the incident in his journal. The Guugu Yimithirr people celebrate the actions of "the little old man" who brokered the peace; Guugu Yimithirr historian Alberta Hornsby said she shares the story to honour her ancestors, and to promote cross-cultural understanding.

Cooktown was to have held an "Expo 2020" festival to mark 250 years since the arrival of Cook, but due to the COVID-19 pandemic in Australia, the event was postponed until 2021. It was to have included a major musical festival involving local people, international stars and a visit by the replica of Cook's ship, the HM Bark Endeavour Replica.

== Attractions ==
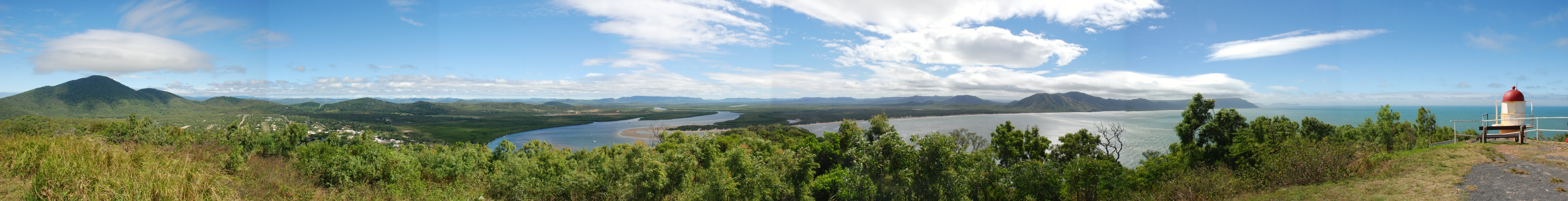
Panorama from Grassy Hill, Cooktown, 2007

Cooktown is of particular interest to botanists since the time of James Cook's visit when extensive collections and illustrations were made of local plants. It is situated at the junction of several vegetation zones including tropical rainforest, sclerophyll forests, sandy dunes and lagoons. Vera Scarth-Johnson, a local resident, gave a priceless collection of her botanical illustrations to the people of Cooktown, which are now housed in a dedicated gallery at Nature's PowerHouse situated in the Botanic Gardens, and features displays of local flora and fauna.

The "Milbi Wall" (or "Story Wall") marks the place of the first encounter between the British seafarers and the local Aborigines. The Milbi ('Story') Wall tells the story of Cooktown and the Endeavour River from the perspective of the Aboriginal people in tiles, and is an outstanding monument to reconciliation.

Charlotte Street is the main heritage precinct.

Cooktown is the northern terminus of the Bicentennial Heritage Trail, which, at 5,330 km (3,310 mi), is the longest trail of its type in the world. The southern end of the trail is at Healesville, Victoria, a town 52 kilometres (32 mi) north-east of Melbourne.

== Climate ==
Cooktown has a tropical savannah climate (Köppen: Aw), with a hot, humid wet season between December and April and a very warm, less humid dry season from May to November. Warm to hot weather is prevalent in all months, with average maxima ranging from 32.1 °C (89.8 °F) in January to 26.4 °C (79.5 °F) in July. Extreme temperatures have ranged from 43.9 °C (111.0 °F) on 27 November 2018 to 4.4 °C (39.9 °F) on 14 July 1958; combining data from the three weather stations in Cooktown: at the Post Office (1874–1987), at the Mission Strip (1942–2018) and the Airport (open since 2000).

Annual rainfall averages 1,607.9 millimetres (63.30 in), with a defined maximum in late summer. The highest daily rainfall in Cooktown has been 405.4 millimetres (16.0 in) on 22 January 1914 and the record monthly rainfall 1,322.6 millimetres (52.1 in) in January 1979. The driest calendar year was 2002 with only 578.8 millimetres (22.8 in) at the newer Cooktown Airport site.

Climate data for Cooktown (15º27'00"S, 145º11'24"E, 5 m AMSL) (2000–2024 normals, extremes 1942–2024)
Month	Jan	Feb	Mar	Apr	May	Jun	Jul	Aug	Sep	Oct	Nov	Dec	Year
Record high °C (°F)	41.7 (107.1)	38.3 (100.9)	38.7 (101.7)	37.2 (99.0)	32.7 (90.9)	32.9 (91.2)	31.9 (89.4)	34.6 (94.3)	38.3 (100.9)	38.0 (100.4)	43.9 (111.0)	41.2 (106.2)	43.9 (111.0)
Mean daily maximum °C (°F)	32.1 (89.8)	31.9 (89.4)	30.7 (87.3)	29.4 (84.9)	27.9 (82.2)	26.8 (80.2)	26.4 (79.5)	27.3 (81.1)	28.9 (84.0)	30.5 (86.9)	31.8 (89.2)	32.4 (90.3)	29.7 (85.4)
Mean daily minimum °C (°F)	24.4 (75.9)	24.4 (75.9)	23.9 (75.0)	23.2 (73.8)	21.3 (70.3)	19.6 (67.3)	18.3 (64.9)	18.5 (65.3)	21.0 (69.8)	22.6 (72.7)	23.9 (75.0)	24.5 (76.1)	22.1 (71.8)
Record low °C (°F)	17.2 (63.0)	17.4 (63.3)	14.0 (57.2)	14.8 (58.6)	9.1 (48.4)	7.2 (45.0)	4.4 (39.9)	8.5 (47.3)	9.7 (49.5)	14.1 (57.4)	16.1 (61.0)	17.8 (64.0)	4.4 (39.9)
Average precipitation mm (inches)	310.3 (12.22)	337.7 (13.30)	388.5 (15.30)	165.0 (6.50)	47.3 (1.86)	33.0 (1.30)	23.3 (0.92)	18.6 (0.73)	13.6 (0.54)	22.9 (0.90)	58.5 (2.30)	204.0 (8.03)	1,607.9 (63.30)
Average precipitation days (≥ 1.0 mm)	16.2	15.5	17.8	12.0	7.3	5.8	5.1	3.7	2.3	3.4	4.8	9.4	103.3
Average afternoon relative humidity (%)	70	72	72	69	66	67	63	60	58	58	59	63	65
Average dew point °C (°F)	23.4 (74.1)	24.0 (75.2)	23.1 (73.6)	21.4 (70.5)	19.5 (67.1)	18.2 (64.8)	16.9 (62.4)	16.6 (61.9)	17.8 (64.0)	19.0 (66.2)	20.5 (68.9)	22.3 (72.1)	20.2 (68.4)
Source: Bureau of Meteorology (2000–2024 normals, extremes 1942–2024)

== See also ==
- Cooktown Airport
