= Westpac Bank Building, Cooktown =

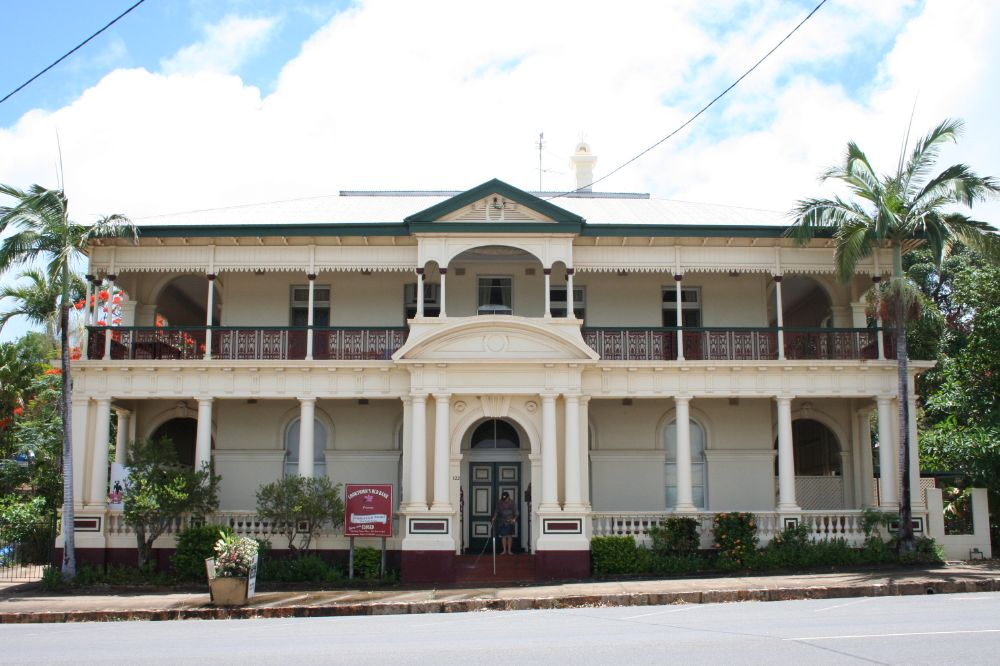
- Westpac Bank, 2008

- Location within Queensland Location within Australia
- 15.4672°S 145.2499°E
- Location: 120 Charlotte Street, Cooktown, Shire of Cook, Queensland, Australia

History
- Design period: 1870s–1890s (late 19th century)
- Built: 1891–1891

Site notes
- Architect: Francis Drummond Greville Stanley
- Architectural style: Classicism

Queensland Heritage Register
- Official name: Westpac Bank, Cooktown, Bank of New South Wales, Queensland National Bank
- Type: state heritage (built)
- Designated: 11 March 1994
- Reference no.: 600419
- Significant period: 1890s (fabric); 1891–ongoing (historical use)
- Significant components: furniture/fittings, banking chamber, residential accommodation – manager's house/quarters

Westpac Bank Building is a heritage-listed former bank building at 120 Charlotte Street, Cooktown, Shire of Cook, Queensland, Australia. It was designed by Francis Drummond Greville Stanley and built from 1891 to 1891. It is also known as Bank of New South Wales and Queensland National Bank. It was added to the Queensland Heritage Register on 11 March 1994.

== History ==
This two-storeyed brick building was completed in 1891, as the premises for the Queensland National Bank. The building was designed by FDG Stanley, who was responsible for the design of a number of bank buildings in Queensland during the 1880s and 1890s.

The gold rush of the early 1870s which attracted miners and speculators to the Palmer River goldfield provided the impetus for the permanent settlement of Cooktown, becoming a municipality in 1876. Cooktown developed rapidly in the mid-1880s and the substantial nature of the buildings in Charlotte Street indicated the town's importance as a port and business centre. The growth of Cooktown and success of the Palmer River goldfields stimulated the growth of the surrounding district and settlement of the Peninsula. The Queensland National Bank commenced business in Cooktown in 1874 and built a small timber premises adjacent to the current site. These premises were demolished when the new building was completed. The other portion of the current site was occupied by John Walsh, a Cooktown storekeeper, Mayor of Cooktown in 1876 and a Member of the Queensland Legislative Assembly for Cook in 1878.

The premises were purchased by the Bank of New South Wales in 1934.

Restoration work was undertaken on the premises in 1941, and dry rot and white ant activity required further maintenance work during the 1950s. The residential areas of the premises were altered during the 1960s, and maintenance has been ongoing since the 1970s. A garage was erected during the 1960s which is now used as a storage shed.

== Description ==
Located in the main street of Cooktown, the Cooktown Westpac Bank is a two-storeyed brick building with a corrugated iron roof and timber verandahs to three sides. It has a rendered street facade, with a substantial colonnade to the ground floor, a more delicately detailed upper storey, and a central entrance portico. The building has an L-shaped plan. The street-facing wing has the bank on the ground floor, with a public banking area to the north-west, and the managers residence above, with bedrooms and lounge overlooking the street. An adjoining wing extending to the rear contains staff quarters and a single storeyed kitchen.

The ground floor colonnade comprises round rendered concrete columns with an entablature with rectangular motifs, and a rendered concrete balustrade with shaped balusters. The first floor has cast iron columns with floriated capitals, a wrought iron balustrade, and a timber frieze. The entrance portico has paired columns to the ground floor flanking an arch with a keystone. An arched pediment spans the width of the entry, and is surmounted by a projecting bay with arched timber work and a triangular timber pediment. The eaves have shaped timber brackets, and a rendered masonry chimney rises above the roofline. Windows and doors to the ground floor street facade are arched, linked with string courses, and decorated with keystones. The upper level openings are rectangular.

The treatment of side and rear elevations is more modest, but with fine detailing. The walls are unrendered brickwork with rectangular openings to ground and first floors, and the verandahs have paired timber posts with timber valances and capitals, boarded timber sunscreens, and cast iron balustrades. The side verandahs are partially enclosed.

The building has timber double hung sash windows, and timber French doors opening onto the verandah.

Internally, the bank contains fine decorative elements. It has plaster ceilings with elaborately decorated plaster cornices, ceiling roses and beam encasings. Timber work includes finely carved and turned stairs, and panelled cedar doors with ventilated fanlights. The public banking area contains a particularly impressive richly carved counter inset with ventilation grilles.

The Cooktown Westpac Bank has a fine and intact facade which contributes to the streetscape of Charlotte Street, and contains fine interior decorative elements.

In 2016, the building is no longer in use as a Westpac branch as only an ATM service is provided in the town.

== Heritage listing ==
The former Westpac Bank Building in Cooktown was listed on the Queensland Heritage Register on 11 March 1994 having satisfied the following criteria.

The place is important in demonstrating the evolution or pattern of Queensland's history.

The Westpac Bank at Cooktown, completed in 1891, is important in demonstrating the pattern of Queensland's history, in particular the development of North Queensland, and the development of Cooktown as a port and business centre to service the important Palmer River goldfields.

The place is important in demonstrating the principal characteristics of a particular class of cultural places.

The place also demonstrates the principal characteristics of a substantial 1890s masonry bank building.

The place is important because of its aesthetic significance.

The building exhibits aesthetic characteristics valued by the community, in particular: its fine exterior detailing; its fine interior decorative elements; and its contribution to the streetscape of Charlotte Street.

The place has a strong or special association with a particular community or cultural group for social, cultural or spiritual reasons.

As a banking premises in Cooktown since 1891, it has a strong association with the community.

The place has a special association with the life or work of a particular person, group or organisation of importance in Queensland's history.

It has special association with the work of architect FDG Stanley, as one of a number of premises designed by Stanley for the Queensland National Bank during the late 19th century.
