= Traveston Powder Magazine =

Heritage listed building in Queensland, Australia

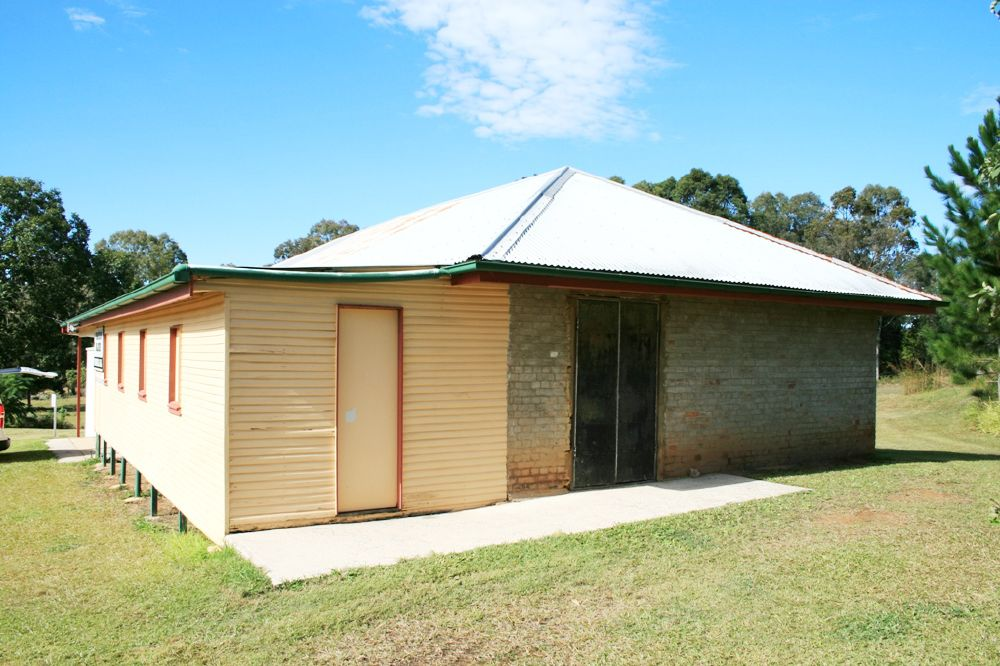
- Former Powder Magazine now part of Traveston Soldiers' Memorial Hall, 2009

- Location within Queensland Location within Australia
- 26.3217°S 152.7831°E
- Location: 7 Traveston Road, Traveston, Gympie Region, Queensland, Australia

History
- Design period: 1870s - 1890s (late 19th century)
- Built: 1887

Queensland Heritage Register
- Official name: Traveston Powder Magazine (former) (incorporated in Traveston Soldiers' Memorial Hall)
- Type: state heritage (built)
- Designated: 10 June 2011
- Reference no.: 602783
- Significant period: 1887-1921, 1923-present
- Significant components: memorial - honour board/ roll of honour
- Builders: Queensland Department of Public Works

Traveston Powder Magazine is a heritage-listed gunpowder magazine incorporated within the Traveston Soldiers' Memorial Hall at 7 Traveston Road, Traveston, Gympie Region, Queensland, Australia. It was built in 1887 by Queensland Department of Public Works. It was added to the Queensland Heritage Register on 10 June 2011.

== History ==
An 1887 brick powder magazine, with post World War II timber extensions, is located on Traveston Road south of the Traveston railway station. The magazine was relocated from Gympie to Traveston in 1898 and became a Soldiers' Memorial Hall in 1923. The former magazine is rare surviving evidence of the infrastructure associated with Gympie's mining heyday, specifically the use of explosives in deep-reef mining. It is also evidence of the Australian practice of commemorating the sacrifices of World War I and World War II with memorial halls and honour boards.

The magazine at Traveston was initially located in the town of Gympie, which was established after the discovery of gold by James Nash, announced in October 1867. The new gold field established Queensland as a significant gold producer, contributing much needed finances to the young colony. Although the alluvial deposits were quickly exhausted, from 1868 shallow reef mining occurred. From 1875 a third phase of mining began, based on deep reef mining, which marked a new era of wealth and prosperity for Gympie. Peak gold production occurred in 1903 but by 1927 production at Gympie had almost ceased.

Reef mining led to the need for explosives to break up rock. For over a century control of all explosives and gunpowder imported into Queensland was the province of the Harbour Master's Department (1860–62), the Department of Ports & Harbours (1862–93), the Marine Department (1894–1928), and the Department of Harbours and Marine (1929–63). In 1964, responsibility was shifted to the Queensland Department of Health. Under The Navigation Act 1876 the master of any ship entering a Queensland port with gunpowder to be unloaded had to ensure that it was placed in a government magazine. The various harbour departments therefore were responsible for the provision of magazines and for the safe storage of explosives at Queensland ports of entry. The Act further regulated the conveyance and storage of gunpowder in any place in Queensland, not just in the ports. On the goldfields, magazines were initially administered by the Mines Department, as control of magazines outside ports was not vested in the Marine Department until 1907.

Some common magazine design features include sturdy construction, small windows and solid doors, ventilation and overhanging eaves, timber floors with copper nails or timber pegs instead of iron nails, and the provision of lightning conductors and copper earthing straps. Magazines were generally located away from population centres and were sometimes surrounded by earthworks to deflect any blast. In addition, magazine complexes were often surrounded by walls or fences to keep people out. Traveston once possessed all of the above properties except the earthworks.

The Queensland Department of Public Works built powder magazines during the 1860s at Brisbane, Maryborough and Gympie; And during the 1870s at Townsville, Ravenswood, Mount Perry (Mount Perry Powder Magazine), Millchester, Cooktown (Cooktown Powder Magazine), Eagle Farm, Thornborough and Maytown. The first government magazines at Cairns (on a floating barge), Charters Towers, Croydon, Georgetown, Herberton, Normanton, Port Douglas and Rockhampton were all built in the 1880s.

Magazines were also upgraded and replaced when necessary, and several were built at Gympie, in two different locations. Gympie's first magazine was built in 1868 by the Department of Public Works, at a cost of £191, on the west side of Commissioner's Gully (just west of today's Queens Park). The Gympie Times of 27 October 1868 suggested that people use it, "as there is as much powder stored in Mary Street as would blow Gympie out of existence. Rather a pleasant fact to dream about".

However, the brick building proved inadequate by 1878. There was insufficient space and a timber skillion section had been added to store excess explosives. A powder explosion in a Mary Street store in 1877 made townsfolk nervous, and tenders for a new magazine were called in May 1878.

A new magazine site was chosen on Rifle Range Road, and the new powder magazine was finished, except for painting, by late November 1878. About £496 was spent on construction, and an August 1878 plan shows a timber building set on stumps, with internal dimensions of 25 by 18 feet (7.6 by 5.5 m), sited within a cutting into a hillside and surrounded by a fence. JG Glover was appointed as magazine keeper in 1880, and in early 1885 James Nash, who had lost most of his money in poor business dealings, was appointed as the magazine keeper at a salary of £100 per annum. His daughter, Miss Amy Nash, eventually became the effective keeper of the magazine on behalf of her father.

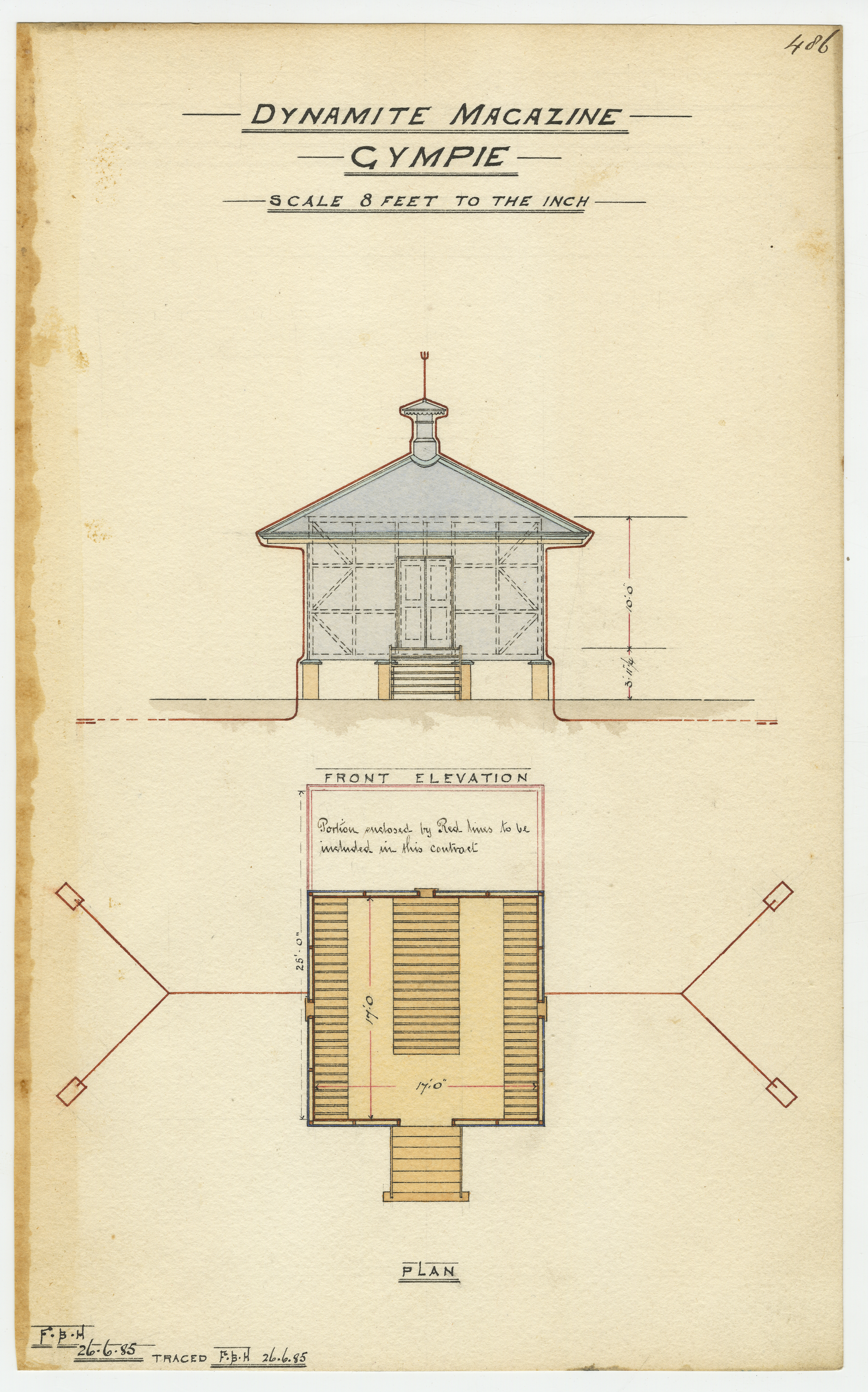
Architectural drawing of the Dynamite Magazine, Gympie, 1885

A dynamite magazine of a similar design to the powder magazine was added to the site at a cost of £217 over 1885–86. An additional powder magazine was built at a cost of £402 over 1887–88, tenders being invited in September 1887. This third magazine was made of brick, with internal dimensions of 30 by 20 feet (9.1 by 6.1 m) with 14-inch (360 mm) thick walls. There were three narrow windows on each side, with a door at one end, and the roof ridge was capped with a round ventilator, on which sat a lightning conductor which was earthed by copper straps which dropped from the hipped roof to the ground and trailed away from the building.

Despite these precautions, the magazine's location was still not distant enough from the town for some people, and agitation to move it accelerated after a loud explosion in November 1897, when some old explosives from the magazine were destroyed in an amateurish manner by an explosives company representative, some 700 metres (2,300 ft) from the magazine.

The locality of Traveston, south of Gympie and on the North Coast railway line, was selected as the site of a new magazine, against the wishes of its residents and the Mines Department. In June 1898 the Mayor of Gympie urged the Queensland Premier to speed up the process of moving the magazines, and tenders to remove the magazine complex and keeper's cottage from Gympie and re-erect them at Traveston were called in July 1898. JC Thompson's tender for £659 was accepted in August, and the move was completed by the end of January 1899. When the magazine buildings were moved to Traveston, James Nash and his daughter went with them. When Nash retired in 1912 he was granted a government pension of £100 per annum, in honour of his services to Queensland, and Amy's husband, Joseph Moore, was appointed keeper of the magazine. James Nash died in October 1913, aged 79.

A 29.5-acre (11.9 ha) reserve for an Explosives Magazine (Portion 877A), located to the south of the Traveston railway station, was gazetted in April 1900. The magazine keeper's cottage was located at the northern point of the reserve. An undated plan shows the three magazines arranged in a row, facing the railway line, with the brick magazine in the centre between the two timber magazines. However, locals contend that both timber magazines were located to the north of the brick magazine, and this seems to be supported by 1914 correspondence which refers to the centre building being on stumps. After the move from Gympie, new timber loading stages were added outside the door of each magazine, to face a railway siding from the railway station, and an iron sheeted fence was constructed around the site.

In 1913 Mr Moore reported to the Portmaster of the Marine Department that the gate to the magazines had been broken by the engine during shunting operations, and in 1915 he reported that the floor of the brick magazine was subsiding. Some flooring and the timber joists under it had to be replaced, due to rot and white ants, and reference is made in 1918 to the use of copper nails in the floor.

In 1921 the magazine reserve consisted of about 29 acres (12 ha), and the magazine complex is described in April 1921 as having:

three magazines, two of iron and one of brick, all in a line, with a siding and loading platform in front. Each of the two iron buildings measures 25'3" by 17'2", with 10' walls sheeted outside with iron and pine inside, pine cove ceiling and hardwood floor. Both floor and ceiling are plentifully perforated for ventilation purposes...both buildings are very old...the brick magazine measures 31' by 21', and is a thoroughly sound building...a 7' G.I. fence surrounds the three magazines.

The Moores were evicted from the magazine keeper's cottage at the end of March 1921, and it was transferred to the Railway Department. In August 1921 tenders were invited for the purchase and removal of the magazine buildings and iron fencing and in September the tenders of LJ Macpherson (£5 for the brick magazine) and MJ Griffin (£94 7s 3d for the fence and the two iron magazines) were accepted. However, other parties were showing an interest in the brick magazine building. World War I (1914–1918), although fought in Europe, North Africa and the Middle East, had a profound impact on Australia. Over 300,000 Australians out of a population of 4 million volunteered for service overseas, with approximately 60,000 of these making the supreme sacrifice. Most Australian communities, including that of Traveston, lost young men in this war. Following the war, most communities wished to erect a memorial for those who served, and particularly those who had not returned.

The Traveston and District Progress Association was formed in June 1914, but the township of Traveston was not surveyed until after the powder magazine closed in 1921. Dairying boomed in the district between the two World Wars, and there was also a thriving local timber industry, shipping out from the railway station. At a meeting of the Traveston district's residents on 13 May 1922, it was resolved to apply to the Minister of Works for the land on which the (brick) magazine building stood in order to transform the building into a Soldiers' Memorial Hall, for the use of the citizens of the growing locality. A petition was lodged that month by Harry Walker, MLA, and the 33 signatories included E Toomey (Hon Secretary), MJ Griffin and William McVicar. In July 1922 the Department of Public Lands, which was responsible for leasing the magazine reserve for farming, agreed to survey 1 acre (0.40 ha) for a Soldiers' Memorial Hall. Residential lots were also surveyed on part of the old magazine reserve at the same time.

At a public meeting at Traveston on 9 September 1922 John Dickson Kenman, Jens Kristian Hansen, Michael John Griffin, Walter Charles Francis, and William McVicar were nominated as trustees for the Soldiers' Memorial Hall Reserve. The residents of Traveston purchased the brick magazine from Walker by December 1922, as the latter had taken over the magazine from LJ Macpherson prior to July 1922. Local knowledge states that the magazine was purchased by five local farmers who each paid £5 and these were probably the five trustees. On 1 February 1923 an Order in Council granted a 1-acre Reserve for a Soldiers' Memorial Hall (R.767) to the trustees.

The brick magazine was used as a hall by the local community between the wars, and a photograph, possibly from this period or post World War II, shows a timber skillion extension to the east side of the magazine building. At this time the ridge ventilator, lightning rods and copper earthing straps were still in place. The lightning rod assembly reportedly survived on a local farm for some time, and consisted of a copper cylinder about 4 inches (100 mm) in diameter, which had holes for three copper spikes (0.5 inches (13 mm) thick by 2 feet (0.61 m) long to jut out at angles, so that the tips were 2 feet (0.61 m) apart. Two 2-inch (51 mm) copper straps at least 0.25 inches (6.4 mm) thick led down the sides of the building to be earthed. In the photograph double timber doors are shown in the west end of the magazine, and these may have existed before the building became a hall. These doors are not on the 1887 plans for the magazine. Lead sheeting from under the roofing iron (of either the two timber and iron magazines or the brick magazine) were recycled by locals for stump caps and guttering.

After World War II the former magazine was extended, possibly in 1948, the year of the dedication of the World War II Honour Board. The extension involved knocking down the east wall of the magazine, and adding a timber section on stumps, with the front door being reused in the north elevation of the extension. A narrow timber dining room was also added along the north elevation of the brick magazine, so that from the road the original brick structure is not visible. However the 1887 brick magazine building is still intact, complete with its original six narrow windows and their timber shutters. A timber coved ceiling, probably original, still exists in the old magazine section, along with a decorative ventilation grille, although a new ceiling extends partway into the old magazine section from the 1940s timber extension. During the 1950s the old floor and its square copper nails was replaced.

Trusteeship of R.767 was transferred to the Widgee Shire Council in July 1989, as all of the original trustees were long deceased. In 1990 the Traveston Tennis Club sought to use part of the reserve for a tennis court, and to enable this use the reserve was redesignated in 1992 as a Reserve for Recreation and Soldiers' Memorial Hall (R.1809).

== Description ==
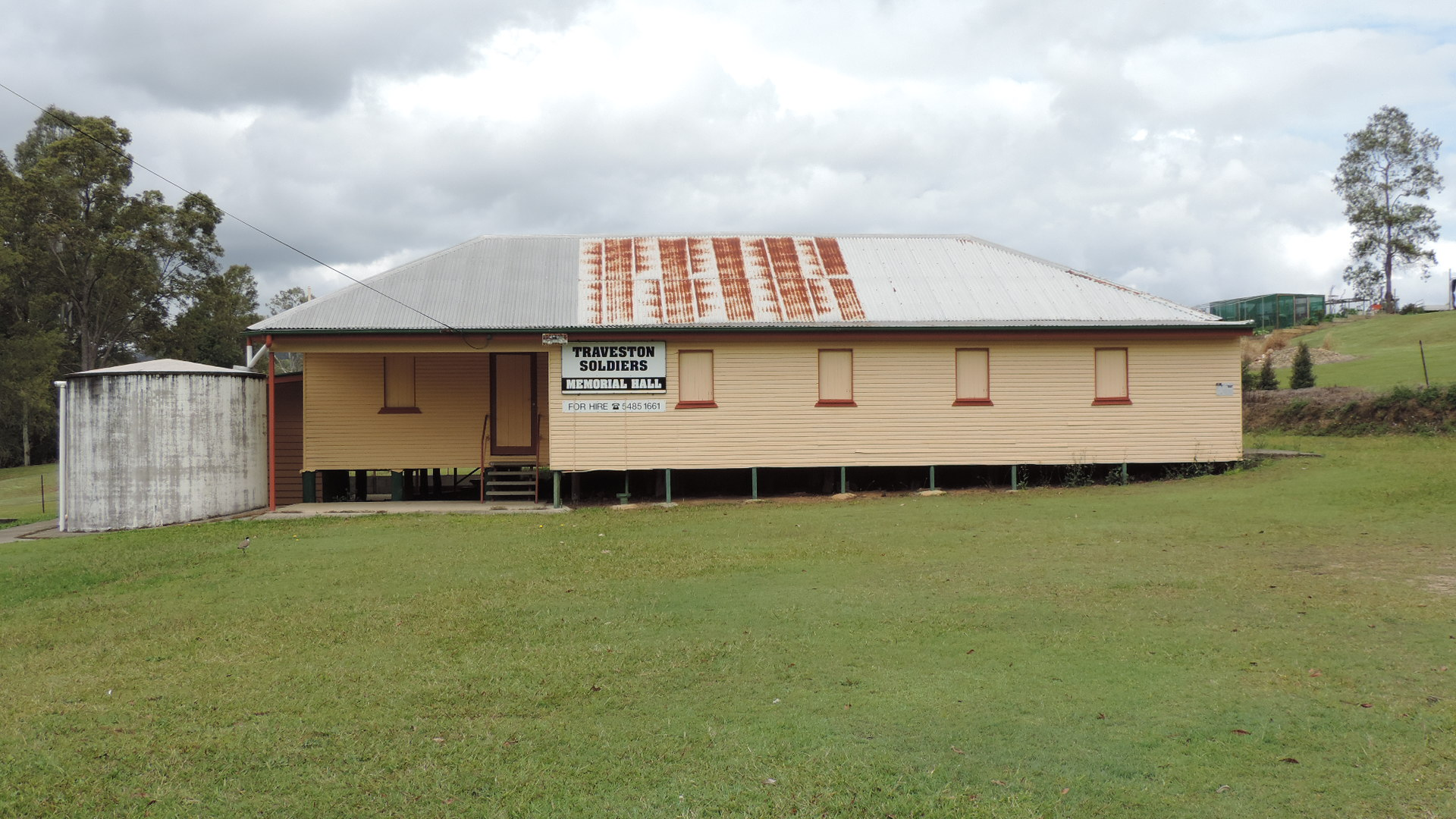
Traveston Soldiers' Memorial Hall, 2015 (powder magazine is not visible from this angle)

A modest rectangular brick building, screened to the north and east by the Traveston Soldiers' Memorial Hall extension, the former Traveston Powder Magazine stands on a sloping, grassed reserve on Traveston Road south of the Traveston railway siding.

The powder magazine stands on concrete foundations and is sheltered by a hipped roof clad with early short sheets of corrugated iron. The roof of the building's eastern end, including the memorial hall extension, is largely clad in recent metal sheeting. Constructed of cavity brick walls 14 inches (360 mm) thick, the former magazine measures 30 by 20 feet (9.1 m × 6.1 m) internally with a floor to ceiling height of 10 feet 3 inches (3.12 m). The three narrow rectangular openings to each long side each measure 42 by 18 inches (1,070 mm × 460 mm) and house solid timber plank and rail windows. The building has a polished timber floor and a coved ceiling lined with painted, beaded tongue and groove timber boards and accommodates a decorative ceiling rose. An opening in the west wall accommodates an escape door. The exterior south and west walls have a cement slurry finish; the north exterior and the interior walls are painted.

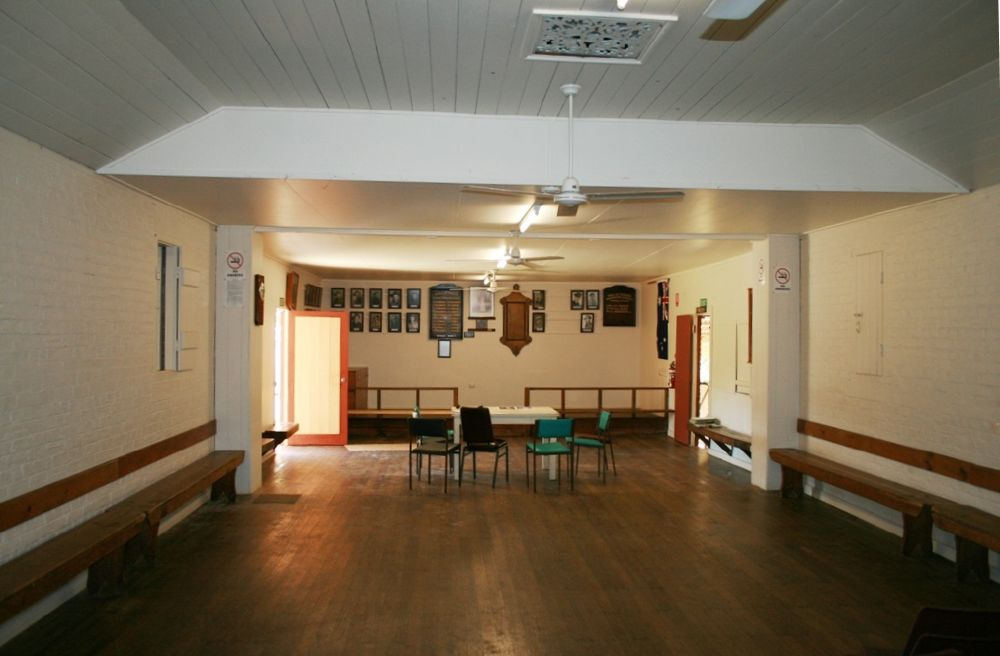
Interior view, showing honour rolls, 2009

The stage end of the hall extends from the line of the demolished exterior east wall of the powder magazine. The original door housed to the centre of this wall now hangs to the opening in the north wall at the stage end. The kitchen wing extension runs along the north side. The hall extensions are timber framed, clad with narrow chamferboards and fibre cement sheeting and are lined with fibre cement sheeting. This part of the building has a flat ceiling lined with similar sheeting, which extends over part of the magazine.

Three honour boards commemorating soldiers from the Traveston district who fought in World War I, World War II and the Vietnam War hang on the wall at the stage end of the hall. Soldiers' portraits and commemorative inscriptions and plaques also line the walls around the stage.

A water tank, toilets and a covered, open carport space stand to the east beyond the stage end of the hall, and these elements are not of cultural heritage significance.

== Heritage listing ==
The former Traveston Powder Magazine (incorporated within the Traveston Soldiers' Memorial Hall) was listed on the Queensland Heritage Register on 10 June 2011 having satisfied the following criteria.

The place is important in demonstrating the evolution or pattern of Queensland's history.

The former Traveston Powder Magazine, built in Gympie in 1887 and moved to Traveston in 1898, is important surviving evidence of the deep-reef mining phase of gold mining in Gympie, the site of Queensland's first major productive goldfield.

The use of the magazine as a Soldiers' Memorial Hall from 1923 is evidence of the Australian practice of commemorating the sacrifices of World War I and World War II with memorial halls and honour boards.

The place demonstrates rare, uncommon or endangered aspects of Queensland's cultural heritage.

The former Traveston Powder Magazine is rare as one of three known surviving 19th century government powder magazines in Queensland. It is also rare surviving mining-related infrastructure from the heyday of deep-reef mining in Gympie.

The place is important in demonstrating the principal characteristics of a particular class of cultural places.

As an 1880s brick powder magazine of standard proportions, retaining most of its sturdy perimeter walls and all of its narrow solid timber windows, Traveston Powder Magazine remains a good example of its type.

Its location next to a railway line, about 18 kilometres (11 mi) south of Gympie, demonstrates the government practice of moving explosives by rail, and keeping explosive hazards at a distance from heavily populated areas.
