= Early Granite Kerbing and Channelling, Cooktown =

Early Granite Kerbing and Channelling
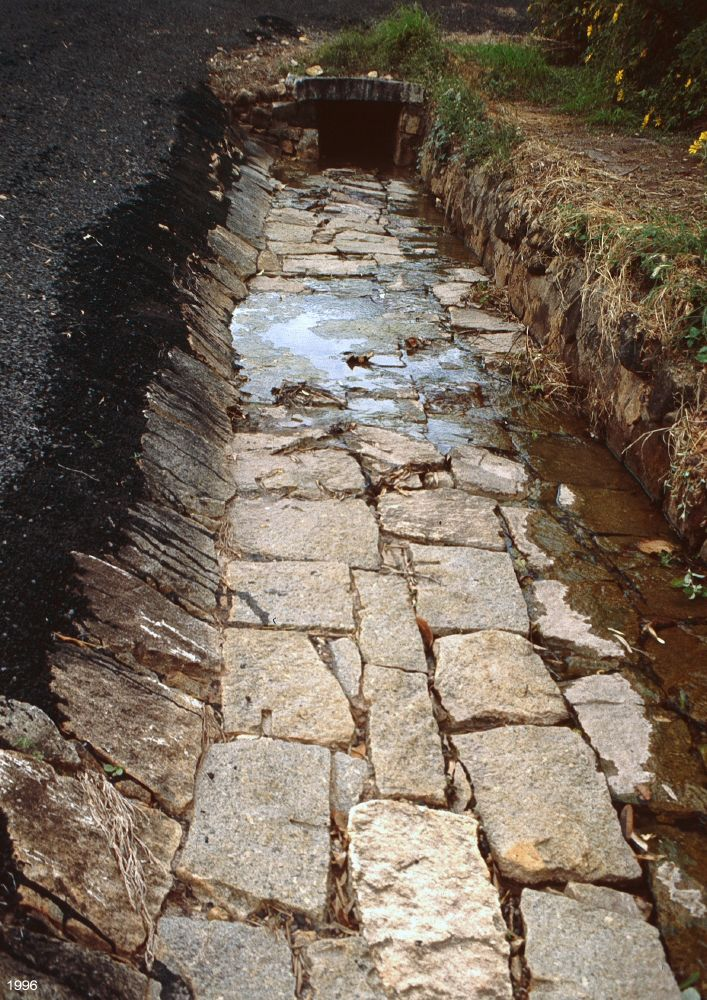
- Early Granite Kerbing and Channelling

- Location within Queensland Location within Australia
- 15.4683°S 145.2504°E
- Location: Adelaide, Charlotte, Furneaux, Green, Helen, Hogg, Hope and Walker Streets and Webber Esplanade, Cooktown, Shire of Cook, Queensland, Australia

History
- Design period: 1870s–1890s (late 19th century)
- Built: 1884–1905

Queensland Heritage Register
- Official name: Early Granite Kerbing and Channelling, Cooktown
- Type: state heritage (archaeological, built)
- Designated: 8 April 1997
- Reference no.: 601731
- Significant period: 1884–1905 (fabric); 1880s–1910s (historical)
- Significant components: kerbing and channelling, drain – storm water, culvert – storm water
- Builders: Thomas Pascoe

Early Granite Kerbing and Channelling, Cooktown is a heritage-listed set of rainwater management structures at Adelaide, Charlotte, Furneaux, Green, Helen, Hogg, Hope and Walker Streets and Webber Esplanade, Cooktown, Shire of Cook, Queensland, Australia. It was built from 1884 to 1905 by Thomas Pascoe. It is also known as Early Granite Kerbing and Channelling. It was added to the Queensland Heritage Register on 8 April 1997.

== History ==
Most of Cooktown's early granite kerbing and channelling was constructed between 1884 and 1905. Particularly fine examples of this work are evident in Charlotte, Hogg, Furneaux, and Green Streets, but the full extent of the work is much wider, and early kerbing and channelling which is now below present street levels continues to be uncovered as new streetwork is undertaken.

Cooktown Municipal Council was established in 1876, but the earliest recorded stone kerbing and channelling work dates to 1884, during a boom period in which the Cooktown Municipal Council commenced a number of civic improvements, including a water supply system; stormwater kerbing, channelling and drains; footpaths; street lighting; and wharf extensions.

In mid-1884 the Council called tenders for 240 yards (220 m) of kerbing in Charlotte Street. The contract was let to Cornishman Tom Pascoe, a Cooktown resident, who tendered with a price of 6/- per yard. He used slabs cut locally from granite boulders along the slopes and spurs of Grassy Hill. In addition to the kerbing constructed by Pascoe, culverts at the junction of Banks and Charlotte Streets were constructed by day labour over a two-week period in the latter months of 1884, the stone for this work being cut from near the Seaview Hotel (no longer in existence), about September.

Early in 1887 Tom Pascoe again successfully tendered with the municipal council, winning the contract to construct the Hill Street culverts. It is not clear whether the large underground stone-pitched drain leading from Hill Street underneath Charlotte Street and the foreshore to the Endeavour River estuary, was constructed at this time also. At the same period, further watertable works and kerbing in Walker Street was carried out by day labour. In the second half of 1888 the Cooktown Municipal Council employed an engineering surveyor to draw up plans and specifications for new culverts at the intersection of Walker and Charlotte Streets, but these proved too expensive, and the work was contracted ultimately in 1889 to Cross and Duffiey for £125. Taylor & Brown constructed a culvert in Hill Street for £21 in 1889.

During the 1890s the Cooktown Municipal Council extended the work of kerbing and channelling the town's principal streets. In the second half of 1890 Thomas Pascoe was contracted to cut 500 yards (460 m) of stone kerbing at 2/8 per yard, a standard price for this work, and in the same period he constructed a culvert in Hill street for £45. A council quarry in Hope Street was operating at this period. In the second half of 1891 Cleary, Brown & Smith were contracted to split and stack 500 yards (460 m) of kerbing at 2/8 per yard. In October 1892 the Council voted a sum of £50 for work in Hope Street and 50 feet (15 m) of kerbing was constructed along the southern side of Hogg Street from the corner of Hope Street. Early in 1893 two men were employed by the council to cut kerbing for future road works. By early April that year they had cut 159 yards (145 m) of kerbing and 54 yards (49 m) of pitching. Between mid-1894 and mid-1895, 271 yards (248 m) of kerbing was constructed in upper Charlotte Street, and in November 1895 kerbing was constructed along the southern side of Green Street from Charlotte Street. Further kerbing along the eastern side of Charlotte Street, between Green and Furneaux Streets, was undertaken August–September 1896.

During Pher Erick Seagren's many years on the Cooktown Municipal (later Town) Council, including two terms as mayor (1898–1901 and 1905–08), the work of improving Cooktown streets was renewed with vigour. Seagren was one of the town's earliest settlers, a substantial landholder in the district, a resident of Cooktown for 60 years, and a prominent and highly respected member of his community. He was keen to encourage Cooktown's progress, and was actively involved in municipal work for many years, beginning with three years on the Daintree Divisional Board (1892–95) prior to being elected to the Cooktown Municipal Council in 1895. Seagren's contribution to his community has been described as follows:

"He has laboured for the improvement of the town with unsparing energy, and the excellent condition of the streets, footpaths, and other public works is due to his progressive methods when mayor."

Early in 1898 the municipal council called tenders for 450 yards (410 m) of kerbing and 600 yards (550 m) of pitching for kerbing in Hope Street from Walker to Hogg Streets. It appears that the kerbing and channelling to lower Charlotte Street was undertaken in 1898 as well, and that similar work to upper Charlotte Street commenced in May 1899. By mid-July 1899, the kerbing on the northern side of Furneaux Street as far as the hill above Helen Street was completed.

Kerbing in Green Street between Charlotte and Helen Streets was commenced in December 1900 and completed in August 1901. Kerbing along Walker Street from the Commercial (now Cooktown) Hotel to the junction of Helen Street was constructed between November 1901 and March 1902. Kerbing along Hope Street commenced in June 1902. In January 1903 it was reported that kerbing and undertables were constructed in Helen Street between Walker and Hogg Streets and in November the same year the kerbing was continued in Hope Street to the corner of Pryde Street. In 1904 a culvert and kerbing was constructed in Adelaide Street and the Furneaux Street kerbing was constructed in 1905.

== Description ==
Cooktown's early kerb and channelling is constructed of granite, a granular igneous rock composed mainly of feldspar (orthoclase) and quartz. The kerb blocks are typically 200 millimetres (7.9 in) thick and 600 millimetres (24 in) long and the channelling is formed from various sized slabs. The early kerbing has shallow drill holes, indicating that the stone was probably drilled by hand.

The kerbs have been constructed to several different depths, possibly dependent on the extent of stormwater run off in specific area. On the western side of Charlotte Street adjacent to R.93 (Cook Monument Reserve), there is a 300-millimetre (12 in) high kerb with an 800-millimetre (31 in) wide channel - these were some of the earliest works, constructed in 1884–85. Directly opposite, along the eastern side of Charlotte Street, which is slightly higher, the kerb is 300 millimetres (12 in) high and the channel is 600 millimetres (24 in) wide. In the main town area in Charlotte Street the kerb heights vary from 300 to 200 millimetres (11.8 to 7.9 in), but the channelling remains constant at 600 millimetres (24 in) wide.

Lower Furneaux Street receives large quantities of stormwater from the elevated areas of the town, and accordingly, there is a 350-millimetre (14 in) high kerb with a 1,400-millimetre (55 in) wide channel.

In Hogg Street adjacent to section 15 the normal kerb and channel becomes a drainage channel formed on both sides of the channel with granite and measures 400 millimetres (16 in) deep by 1,100 millimetres (43 in) wide. At the intersection of Hogg and Charlotte Streets is a particularly fine granite boxed culvert, and at the intersection of Adelaide and Hogg Streets, an early stone-pitched dish drain.

The channelling to the streets along the crest and upper slopes of the ridge running south from Grassy Hill direct stormwater run-off toward Charlotte Street, and at the junction of Charlotte Street with Hill Street, a large stone-pitched underground drain carries the run-off underneath Charlotte Street and the foreshore to the Endeavour River estuary. Along Charlotte Street there are a number of vertical and side entry stormwater gully pits which appear to connect to early underground stormwater drains.

== Heritage listing ==
The Early Granite Kerbing and Channelling of Cooktown was listed on the Queensland Heritage Register on 8 April 1997 having satisfied the following criteria.

The place is important in demonstrating the evolution or pattern of Queensland's history.

The early granite kerbing and channelling at Cooktown is important in illustrating the pattern of Queensland's history, especially the important role of Cooktown, once a prosperous regional centre and port, in the development of far North Queensland in the late 19th and early 20th centuries. The work was initiated in the mid-1880s when the Cooktown Municipal Council commenced a number of other civic improvements, including a water supply system, street lighting and wharf extensions.

The place demonstrates rare, uncommon or endangered aspects of Queensland's cultural heritage.

Such extensive and early use of granite kerbing and channelling, illustrating the confidence and optimism of local business and civic leaders in the future of Cooktown in the late 19th century, is unknown in any other town of far North Queensland, and therefore is significant for its rarity value.

The place has potential to yield information that will contribute to an understanding of Queensland's history.

As some Cooktown street levels have been raised, there is the possibility that sub-strata kerbing and channelling exist with the potential to extend the current body of knowledge about this early civic work and the work of the Cooktown Municipal Council in general.

The place is important because of its aesthetic significance.

The early granite kerbing and channelling has aesthetic significance, contributing to the overall aesthetic and amenity of the historic streetscapes of Cooktown and providing a high degree of unity to the townscape in its material and design.

The place has a strong or special association with a particular community or cultural group for social, cultural or spiritual reasons.

It contributes also to the uniqueness of Cooktown, and as such is valued by the local community as an important element of Cooktown's history and identity. That the community values the early kerbing and channelling is evident in the actions of the Cook Shire Council, which since the 1970s has been constructing new granite kerbing and channelling to complement the earlier work.
