= Gallop Botanic Reserve =

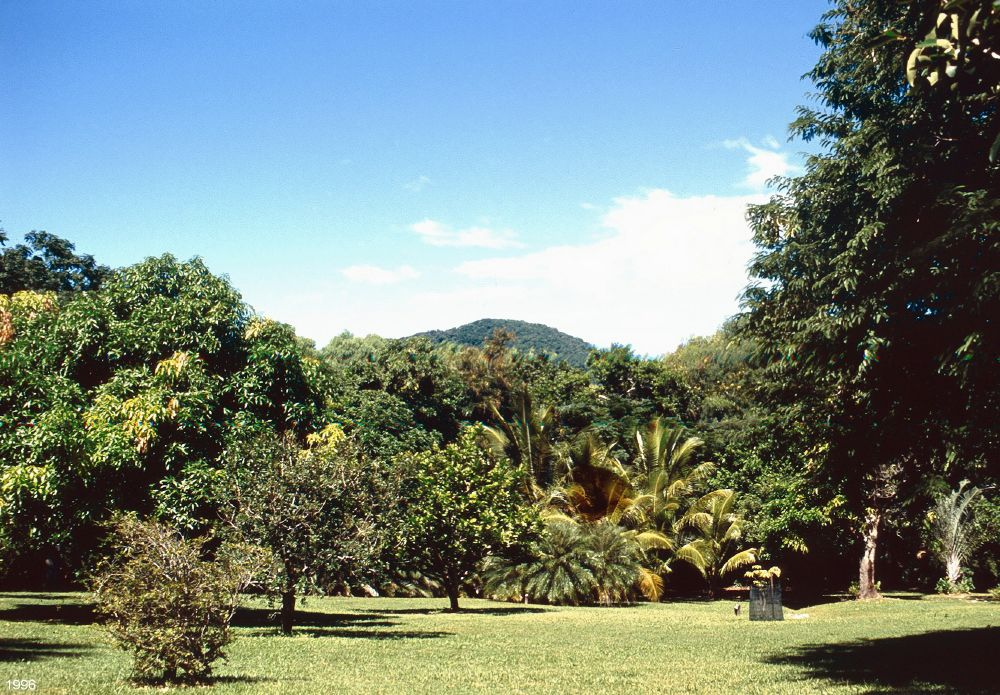
- Gallop Botanic Reserve, incorporating Cooktown Botanic Gardens, 1996

- Location within Queensland Location within Australia
- 15.4698°S 145.2597°E
- Location: Finch Bay Road, Cooktown, Shire of Cook, Queensland, Australia

History
- Design period: 1870s–1890s (late 19th century)
- Built: 1878–1980s

Queensland Heritage Register
- Official name: Gallop Botanic Reserve, incorporating Cooktown Botanic Gardens, Cooktown Botanic Gardens and Recreation Reserve, Queens' Park Gardens and Recreation Reserve
- Type: state heritage (archaeological, built, landscape)
- Designated: 13 October 1997
- Reference no.: 601696
- Significant period: 1878–1890s (fabric); 1878–1917 (historical)
- Significant components: terracing, rockpool/s, trees/plantings, drainage, garden – rock / rockery, garden – bed/s, sports field/oval/playing field, pathway/walkway, well, road/roadway, steps/stairway, quarry

Gallop Botanic Reserve, incorporating Cooktown Botanic Gardens, is a heritage-listed botanic garden at Finch Bay Road, Cooktown, Shire of Cook, Queensland, Australia. It was built from 1878 to 1980s. It is also known as Cooktown Botanic Gardens & Recreation Reserve and Queens' Park Gardens & Recreation Reserve. It was added to the Queensland Heritage Register on 13 October 1997.

== History ==
Cooktown Botanic Gardens and Recreation Reserve, an area of 154 acres (62 ha) southeast of Cooktown between the town and Finch's Bay, was surveyed and proclaimed in 1878, less than 5 years after the establishment of Cooktown in October 1873 as the Endeavour River port to the Palmer Goldfields. In the period 1878–1917 the Cooktown Municipal Council established a formal botanical garden and recreational playing fields on a small part of the reserve closest to town. Apart from improving an existing dray road to the ocean and establishing walking tracks, the bulk of the reserve remained largely undeveloped. From the mid-1880s to the early 1900s, when Cooktown boomed as a goldrush town, the formal botanical gardens flourished; as output from the Palmer declined and Cooktown's fortunes fell in the early 20th century, funding to maintain the botanical gardens diminished, and they were closed to the public in 1917. With the late 20th century emergence of Cooktown tourism, the gardens were re-established as an important historical attraction.

The movement to establish botanical and recreational reserves in Queensland's larger 19th century towns and cities reflected contemporary thinking about the importance of providing adequate public recreational facilities. The working and middle classes controlling local government in Queensland's urban centres regularly petitioned the colonial government for the provision of public open spaces in the form of recreational reserves and botanical gardens. The establishment of these reserves also reflected an enormous public interest, formerly the preserve of governments and wealthy private individuals (such as English botanist Joseph Banks), in experimenting with the commercial and scientific values of exotic trees and plants and indigenous Australian flora.

Queensland's botanic gardens initially were the responsibility of the Lands Department, which allocated annual grants to trustees but did little to encourage botanical experimentation. In 1889 responsibility was transferred to the newly created Queensland Department of Agriculture and Stock, which through a subsidy system allocated in proportion to local subscription, encouraged greater experimentation with exotic plant species for commercial and scientific purposes. The new Department worked closely with the privately supported Queensland Acclimatisation Society (based in Brisbane), and established the Kamerunga State Nursery near Cairns in the late 1880s.

Moves within Cooktown to establish a botanical gardens were underway from at least October 1876, when the Cooktown Municipal Council resolved to apply to the Queensland Colonial Government for land between the town and Finch's Bay (already a popular recreational venue) for the purpose of a water reserve, recreation ground and botanical garden. Sections of this were already occupied by Chinese market gardeners, who were also logging the area for timber to produce charcoal. The area also had historical connections with the work of naturalists Joseph Banks and Daniel Solander, members of the 1770 exploratory voyage of HMS Endeavour, under the command of Lieutenant James Cook, along the east coast of Australia. During a 7-week stay in the vicinity of Cooktown in 1770, while repairs were made to the Endeavour, Banks and Solander collected the most comprehensive natural history collection of the entire east coast voyage.

In June 1877 Cooktown Municipal Council received a government grant of £200 to assist in establishing the reserve (this became an annual grant), and appointed a Gardens Committee, but little was achieved until after the reserve was surveyed in May 1878. By July 1878 some fencing had been erected and in August–September 1878 the Council appointed a caretaker/gardener and offered £10 for a suitable plan of laying out a botanical gardens on a small section of the best land in the reserve (nearest the town). Surveyor Brittian's plan, which included areas marked out for walks, was adopted. The existing dray road through the reserve to Finch's Bay was improved, and the Council appointed Trustees for the reserve in December 1878. During 1879 structural development was undertaken, including roadworks, fencing, drains, and the establishment of a nursery on the eastern side of the hill facing Finch's Bay, stocked with plants from the Brisbane Botanic Gardens. The Chinese still had a presence on the reserve at this stage, having agreed to pay rent to the Council.

Interest in the reserve appears to have waned in the early 1880s, and by 1886 there does not seem to have been a gardener or caretaker permanently employed. However, in the mid-1880s the Council recommenced development of the formal botanical gardens. In 1885–86 a botanist was employed to lay out a new nursery, an undated Council map indicating that this was established within the present border of the gardens. Early in 1886, trees and shrubs were ordered from the Queensland Acclimatisation Society in Brisbane, and a contractor was employed to dig over the gardens. A full-time gardener was employed from September 1888. Along with the renewed interest in the formal gardens, development of the recreation reserve as a sporting facility was resumed, the playing field being upgraded and a concrete cricket pitch laid in 1888.

Activity in the formal botanical gardens peaked in the first half of the 1890s. A well was sunk in 1890 and a pump, tank and pipe reticulation installed. A second well was sunk at some later stage. In 1892 a gardener's cottage (removed in 1917) was erected on the reserve and occupied by Charles Watson, who held the position of caretaker/gardener from 1890 to 1902. By this period the formal botanical gardens had been enclosed with a paling fence and intensively developed with lawns, shrubs and garden beds. By early 1893, they were being referred to officially as Queen's Park and Gardens - later the name came to represent the whole of the reserve. In the 1890s, stone-lined paths, stone-pitched pools and stone-work footbridges were built along a creek descending from the hills behind Cherry Tree Bay, flower gardens flourished, a bush house was erected (1893) and a wide range of trees and shrubs of both decorative and economic value were planted in the gardens. Shade and street trees in the Cook Monument Park, and in Cooktown's main street, Charlotte Street, were supplied from the botanic gardens.

In the late 1890s, as Cooktown's population and wealth declined along with the decline in gold output from the Palmer River, the Trustees of the Queen's Park Gardens and Recreation Reserve began to experience serious financial difficulties. Funding came partly from local subscription and donation, partly from annual government grants (paid in proportion to local subscription and donation), partly from an annual grant from the local Council, and partly from the sale of plants, fruit and flowers. Through the early years of the 20th century, the Trustees managed to maintain the gardens and recreation grounds to a reasonable standard, but little new work was undertaken. Vandalism and theft of trees from the larger reserve became increasingly problematic, and the cyclone of 19 January 1907 caused considerable damage to the botanical gardens, bushhouse and gardener's house. Several government subsidies enabled repairs to be undertaken 1907–1908. Despite continuing financial difficulties there was some renewal of activity in the gardens 1910–1912. A windmill was erected in the gardens in 1910, planting of specimen and shade trees continued, and a decorative fountain may have been installed.

In 1912, the Queensland government ceased giving subsidies to reserves for special improvements, although they still received the usual endowment of 7/6 in the pound on subscriptions and donations. This became a major concern to the Trustees of the Queen's Park Gardens and Recreation Reserve. During 1915, the Cooktown Town Council began to pay its grant to Queen's Park in small sums at irregular intervals - perhaps a response to the contingencies of the First World War, but more likely reflecting the general decline of Cooktown as a service and administrative centre and port. By January 1917, closure of the reserve was seen as unavoidable. Tenders were called for the lease of the cottage and gardens, or recreation reserve, or both, but none being received, action was taken to wind up the affairs of the Trustees. The gardener's cottage, bushhouse, windmill, garden stock and various implements were sold at auction and the Trustees accounts closed in June 1917. Cooktown Town Council retained trusteeship of the whole of the reserve, but the formal gardens and recreation grounds were not used again for public recreation until 1979. The quarrying of granite for street kerbing, from outcrops on the hill near Finch's Bay, probably dates to after 1917.

In December 1980 the Cook Shire Council resolved to restore the reserve, particularly the formal gardens. A 1982 report prepared by consultant Vince Winkel, emphasised the preservation of original plantings and indigenous flora, including: a mangrove forest, the strand plants on the beachfront facing the sea, the strand plants of the land side of the sand dune, the swamp area immediately behind, the open forest on the hillsides, the heavier wooded open forest, and on the sporting field side where the old botanical gardens were, the riverine forest of tea trees along the creek.

In 1984 Cook Shire Council commenced reconstruction of the formal botanical gardens, comprising approximately 3.5 hectares (8.6 acres), with the assistance of Commonwealth Employment Funding. The original gardens area was cleared and lawns established, stonework re-built and trees removed. A walking track was cleared to Finch's Bay along the old dray track, and another walking track continues from this track to Cherry Tree Bay. Playground equipment was placed in the southeastern corner of the recreation oval. On 19 December 1984, the whole of the reserve was officially re-opened as the Gallop Botanic Reserve, commemorating the contributions of Mr Rollo Darcy Gallop and his son, Mr Graham Darcy Gallop, Administrators of Cook Shire from July 1961 to March 1969 and April 1969 to June 1979 respectively. The Gallops were also civil engineers, practising as Gallop and Associates.

In 1986 Cook Shire Council commissioned a conservation report on the reserve, and in the early 1990s undertook a programme of reconstruction and conservation of the original layout of the botanical gardens. This included the re-instatement of above ground stone drains - mostly with the original stone but some realignment; repairs to the stonework of the crossings over the drainage system; and conversion of an early well to a pump house (with recent stonework).

The botanical gardens, now known as the Cooktown Botanic Gardens, are contained within the Gallop Botanic Reserve. These gardens have been expanded in the last 10 years with the establishment of an exotic plant section, a palmetum, a section of native plants, and a "Solander's Gardens", and are used extensively by tourists and locals for recreational and educational purposes.

== Description ==
Gallop Botanic Reserve contains 62.3216 hectares (154.000 acres) and lies approximately 1.5 kilometres (0.93 mi) from the centre of Cooktown. The reserve is bordered by the Coral Sea on the east, Alligator Creek to the east and south, Garden Street on the west, and vacant land designated Special Purpose - Community Facilities to the north.

The reserve incorporates: Cooktown Botanic Gardens; an early sports field and concrete cricket pitch; two granite quarries with evidence of hand-quarrying technology; walking tracks; and Finch's Bay Road.

Geographically, most of the reserve comprises high spurs of large granite boulders, bounded to the east by a granite headland with indigenous vegetation extending to the ocean and beaches at Finch's Bay and Cherry Tree Bay. A small creek on the reserve flows into Cherry Tree Bay.

Most of Gallop Botanical Reserve has open sclerophyll vegetation consisting of Melaleuca spp, Eucalypts spp (Bloodwood), Cooktown Ironwood and various grasses. The Cooktown Botanic Gardens, consisting of 3.5 hectares (8.6 acres) within the Gallop Botanic Reserve, is vegetated with similar species of native trees, but interspersed with the indigenous vegetation are formal lawned areas, stone pitched waterways and planted exotic species.

The gardens retain a number of elements of their late 19th century design, including garden terraces, dry-pitched granite rockpools, subsidiary covered stone-pitched drains, stone steps, wells, rock garden survivals and diverse archaeological elements. Some original plantings survived the period of neglect from 1917 to 1979, and at least 90 species originating from the early plantings as a botanical gardens have been identified.

Although adaptations to the formal gardens occurred in the 1980s, there is substantial physical evidence to suggest that the layout is broadly similar to that developed in the period 1878–1917. Large sections of the original, extensive, underground drainage system of stone-pitched channelling have yet to be investigated, and possibly further original stone-pitched waterways and garden beds may exist which have yet to be identified.

== Heritage listing ==
Gallop Botanic Reserve, incorporating Cooktown Botanic Gardens was listed on the Queensland Heritage Register on 13 October 1997 having satisfied the following criteria.

The place is important in demonstrating the evolution or pattern of Queensland's history.

Gallop Botanic Reserve, established in 1878 as the Cooktown Botanic Gardens and Recreation Reserve, is important in illustrating the pattern of Queensland's history. Its establishment reflected Cooktown's sudden emergence in the mid-1870s as the principal port of far north Queensland, and improvements made to the reserve in the last two decades of the 19th century illustrate sustained local and government confidence in Cooktown during this period. Through the early establishment of the Cooktown Botanic Gardens and Recreation Reserve, a substantial area of natural vegetation close to Cooktown has been preserved. This is particularly significant because of the association of Cooktown and its environs with the important work of naturalists Joseph Banks and Daniel Solander, who collected extensive plant specimens from the district in 1770.

The place demonstrates rare, uncommon or endangered aspects of Queensland's cultural heritage.

Gallop Botanic Reserve is unique in Queensland, comprising not only a formal botanical garden, but also substantial natural forest and ocean frontage. Cooktown Botanic Gardens within Gallop Botanic Reserve are unique for the extent of covered and uncovered early stone-pitching surviving in the grounds, and their 19th layout is one of the most intact in Queensland.

The place has potential to yield information that will contribute to an understanding of Queensland's history.

Cooktown Botanic Gardens within Gallop Botanic Reserve are significant for their potential to reveal further information about late 19th century public gardens location and design, and the social, economic and cultural function of such gardens in a pioneering community.

The place is important in demonstrating the principal characteristics of a particular class of cultural places.

The formal botanical gardens within Gallop Botanic Reserve survive as important evidence of late 19th century public gardens design and planting. Although adaptations occurred in the 1980s, physical evidence suggests that the present layout is broadly similar to that developed in the period 1878–1917. The gardens retain a number of elements of their late 19th century design, including garden terraces, dry-pitched granite rockpools, subsidiary covered stone-pitched drains, stone steps, wells, rock garden survivals and diverse archaeological elements. Some original plantings survived the period of neglect from 1917 to 1979, and at least 90 species originating from the early plantings as a botanical gardens have been identified. Other surviving early elements of the wider reserve include the recreational oval, cricket pitch, and the route of the early dray track through the reserve to Finch's Bay, illustrating the important role of the reserve as a recreational facility since the earliest days of the establishment of Cooktown.

The place is important because of its aesthetic significance.

The Gallop Botanic Reserve has considerable aesthetic value associated not only with the restored formal botanical gardens, but also with the geography of the place, including granite outcrops and a spectacular, unspoilt coastline.

The place has a strong or special association with a particular community or cultural group for social, cultural or spiritual reasons.

Finch's Bay, part of which is contained within the Gallop Botanic Reserve, has had an important association with Cooktown residents for over 120 years as a place of recreation. The Cooktown Botanic Gardens has a special association for the local community with the establishment and development of their town in the last quarter of the 19th century. Since 1980, Cook Shire Council has invested in the restoration and re-development of the formal gardens and recreation grounds as an historical tourist attraction.
