= Cooks Monument and Reserve =

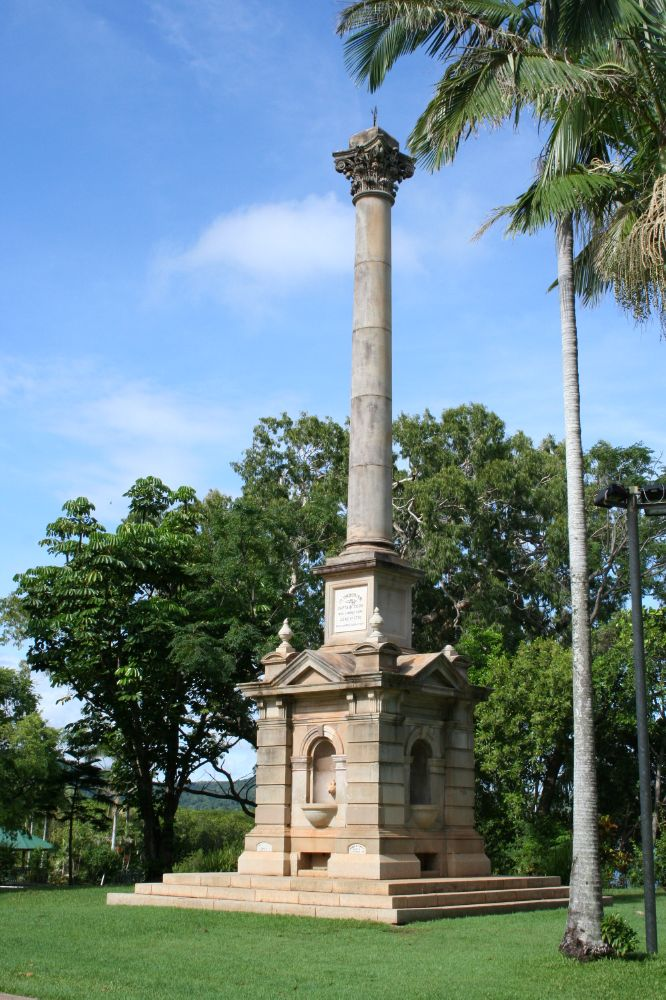
- Cooks Monument and Reserve, 2010

- Location within Queensland Location within Australia
- 15.4634°S 145.2499°E
- Location: Charlotte Street, Cooktown, Shire of Cook, Queensland, Australia

History
- Design period: 1870s–1890s (late 19th century)
- Built: 1887–1989

Site notes
- Architect: Office of the Queensland Colonial Architect

Queensland Heritage Register
- Official name: Cooks Monument and Reserve
- Type: state heritage (built, landscape)
- Designated: 30 April 1997
- Reference no.: 601044
- Significant period: 1887– (social, fabric); 1887, 1948, 1989 (historical)
- Significant components: memorial/monument, sign, plaque, memorial – cairn, park / green space, cannon, well, trees/plantings, memorial – fountain
- Builders: Hobbs and Carter

Cooks Monument and Reserve is a heritage-listed memorial at Charlotte Street, Cooktown, Shire of Cook, Queensland, Australia. It was designed in the office of the Queensland Colonial Architect and built by Hobbs and Carter in 1887. It was added to the Queensland Heritage Register on 30 April 1997.

== History ==
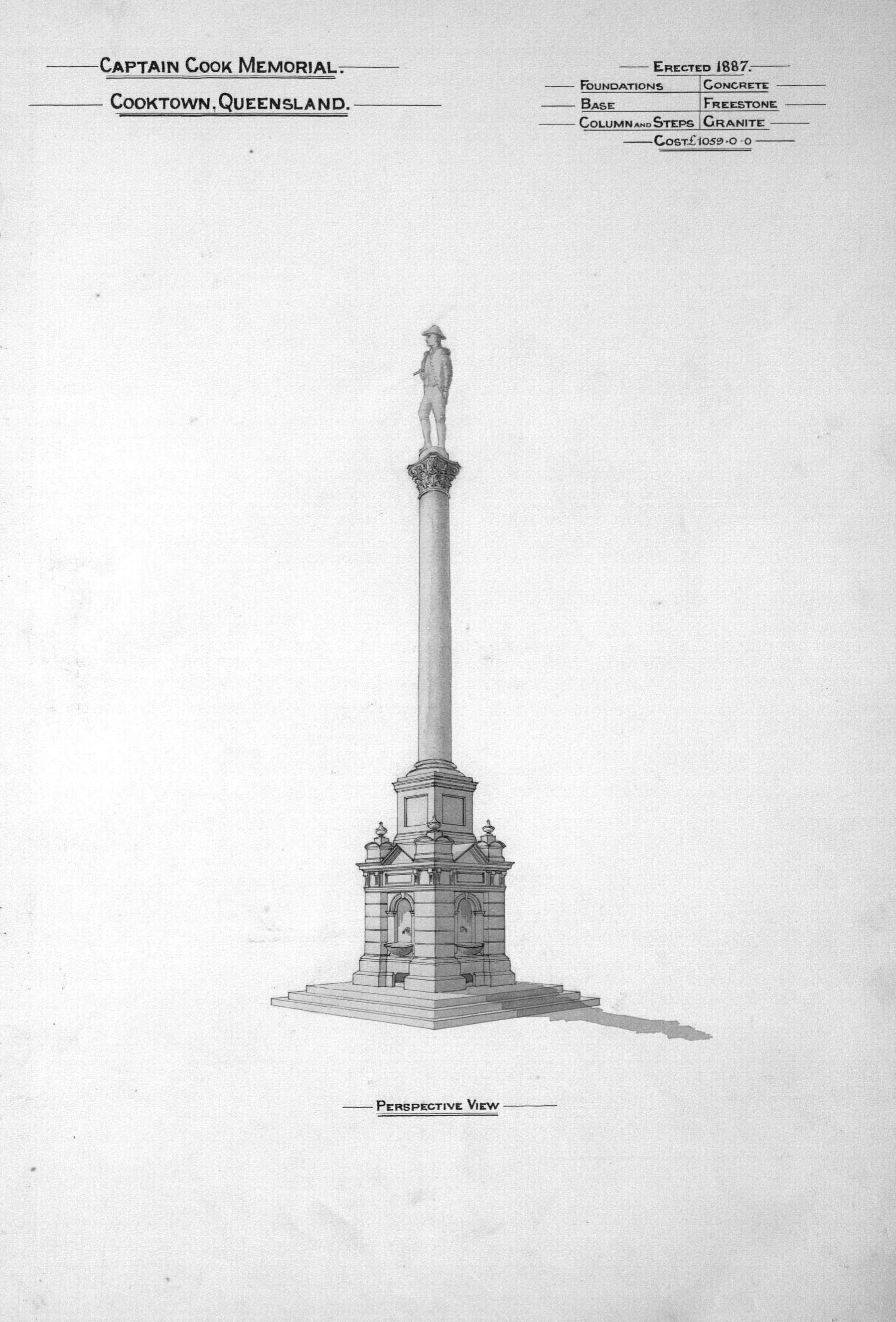
Original design of the monument included a statue of Cook at the top

The Cook Monument at Cooktown was erected in 1887 by Hobbs and Carter of South Brisbane, to designs prepared in the office of the Queensland Colonial Architect, George St Paul Connolly.

Cooktown had been established in September 1873 as the Endeavour River port for the Palmer River goldfields. By the mid-1880s it was serving one of the most significant goldfields in Queensland. A railway was constructed from Cooktown to Laura between 1884 and 1888, further opening the port to development. By the late 1880s Cooktown had become the important centre not only of a thriving mining district (boosted by the 1887 discovery of tin along the Annan River), but also of pearling, beche-de-mer, and pastoral activity. After 1885, Cooktown was also the main port for Queensland trade with New Guinea.

In May 1886, the then Premier of Queensland, Sir Samuel Walker Griffith, travelled to Cooktown and other northern ports on a tour of inspection, partly associated with defence issues, more with political strategy. The Separation movement was gaining momentum in Townsville and the far north, and Griffith was keen to demonstrate his government's commitment to, and concern for, northern Queensland. The Cooktown Municipal Council at this time was seeking to commemorate James Cook's encampment at the Endeavour River in the winter of 1770, and it appears that Griffith, as political expediency, committed the Colonial Architect's office to designing the Cook monument at Cooktown.

The Cooktown Municipal Council had intended that the monument include a statue of James Cook, but when tenders were called in June 1886, then again in September 1886 and February 1887 with different materials specified, they were for the column only. In December 1887 Sir Samuel Griffith re-visited Cooktown, and when requested by the mayor to provide assistance in commissioning the statue, refused, stating that it was more important to commemorate the event than the person.

The contract had been let in February 1887 to Hobbs and Carter of South Brisbane, with a price of £1,059 and completion time of 8 months. It appears that the memorial was not constructed on the site originally proposed, which necessitated an additional foundation, bringing the final cost to £1,297. The foundation stone was laid on 1 September 1887 by the Mayor of Cooktown, John Savage, and the work had been completed by January 1888. Sandstone used in the construction came from Murphys Creek in southeast Queensland, and it was reputedly the first stone structure erected in Cooktown.

Around the monument, a small (1.5 acres (0.61 ha)) reserve for municipal purposes was gazetted in June 1888. A brick-lined town well, believed to have been built by the Cooktown Municipal Council to service ships berthed at the nearby Cooktown wharves, was constructed in the reserve, south of the monument. This work probably was undertaken post-1888, as the Council filled in much of the Cook Monument Reserve in 1889. A small vertical boiler engine pumped water from the well to the wharves through a 3" diameter pipe. It is understood that the well has also supplied adjacent Charlotte Street businesses from time to time.

In the 20th century, several other memorials were erected within the reserve:

- Kennedy Memorial: a granite cairn erected in 1948 to honour British explorer Edmund Besley Court Kennedy, who was killed by Aborigines on Cape York Peninsula (part of Cook Shire) in December 1848. Kennedy's exploratory work helped to open far north Queensland to pastoral settlement in the mid-19th century. The memorial was unveiled on 25 September 1948 by the Chair of the Cook Shire Council, Mayor WCH Hodges.
- National Horse Trail Marker: a small granite cairn erected in August 1977 to mark the beginning of the National Horse Trail from Cooktown to Melbourne, and the epic ride of Dan Seymour, who in the early 1970s demonstrated the feasibility of such a trail. The trail was mapped between 1974 and the 1980s, when it was made a bi-centennial project. Sections are used regularly, but few people have ridden the full distance. The marker was erected by the Australian Trail Horse Riders' Association and was unveiled by Henry Tranter, President of the Tablelands Trail Horse Riders' Club.
- Annan River Water Supply Memorial Fountain: in 1989 the old town well on the reserve was cleaned out and a fountain constructed over it to commemorate the inauguration in November 1989 of a new permanent water supply from the Annan River to Cooktown. The Annan River pipeline was a joint federal, state and local government project, replacing Cooktown's previous water supply from the bore fields on the southern outskirts of the town.
- 1803 Cannon: There is now located in the reserve a cannon cast in 1803 in Carron, Scotland, and bearing the royal monogram GR. During the height of the "Russian invasion" scare of 1885, the Cooktown Municipal Council telegraphed to the Premier of Queensland, requesting him to supply arms, ammunition and an officer to take charge of the Cooktown volunteer defence force. This cannon was sent, along with 3 cannonballs, 2 rifles and 1 officer. Initially the cannon was located on the foreshore near the Cooktown Powder Magazine on Webber Esplanade, overlooking the entrance to Cooktown Harbour on the Endeavour River estuary. It is fired once a year as part of the annual Cook's landing re-enactment celebrations.

== Description ==
Cook's Monument is situated in a small reserve located between Charlotte Street and the Endeavour River estuary, on a slight rise adjacent to the site where James Cook beached the barque Endeavour for repairs in mid-1770. The reserve is grassed, with palms and mature trees around the perimeter.

The monument comprises a tall, slender sandstone column, topped with a detailed capital, which rises from a square pedestal resting upon a granite base and plinth. The steps of the plinth lead to a square dado incorporating drinking fountains on each side. These fountains were once linked to a regular water supply [possibly an internal tank], and the water outlets emerge from the mouths of sculpted animal heads. The dado is set beneath a modest entablature and the pediment is flanked by sandstone urns at each corner.

To the north of the Cook Monument is the 1803 cannon sent in 1885 to Cooktown by the Queensland colonial government, for the use of the local volunteer defence force. It stands on a concrete platform. Adjacent to the gun is an interpretative sign.

To the south of the Cook Monument, but within the same reserve, are three more recent memorials and the early town well:

- Kennedy Memorial: a conical-shaped granite cairn, approximately 1.2 metres (3 ft 11 in) high, resting on a concrete base, with an embossed brass plaque in the face addressing Charlotte Street.
- National Horse Trail Marker: a simple granite cairn or marker approximately 0.5 metres (1 ft 8 in) high, conical in shape, with an embossed brass plaque in the face addressing Charlotte Street.
- Annan River Water Supply Memorial Fountain and Early Town Well: The fountain comprises a series of metal water pipes constructed over an early, brick-lined town well. The well has a diameter of 23 feet (7.0 m) at ground level, from which the shaft is bricked down 16 feet (4.9 m) to a 4-foot-6-inch (1.37 m) wide ledge, after which it narrows to 14-foot (4.3 m) diameter, and is bricked down a further 8 feet 4 inches (2.54 m), at the bottom of which are granite slabs. In the wall of the upper shaft are two arched entrances, now filled in with rubble, leading to underground spider channels or aqueducts which formerly fed the well with storm water run-off, in addition to the ground water from below. Formerly there were three cross-logs let into the walls near the top, for roof joist supports. Adjacent to the well was a tank stand with engine and boiler beneath. Water was pumped form the well to the tank, then from the tank to the wharves via a galvanised pipe along the foreshore. .Above the bricks are several courses of cement blocks [added at a later date], topped by a metal railing added in 1989 as part of the conversion to a fountain. The capacity of the well is approximately 47,000 imperial gallons (210,000 L; 56,000 US gal).

== Heritage listing ==
Cooks Monument and Reserve was listed on the Queensland Heritage Register on 30 April 1997 having satisfied the following criteria.

The place is important in demonstrating the evolution or pattern of Queensland's history.

Cook's Monument and Reserve is significant historically for its commemoration of Cook's encampment below Grassy Hill, at the mouth of the Endeavour River, in mid-1770 - the first official British sojourn on the east coast of Australia. The place is significant also as Queensland's earliest memorial to James Cook and the crew of the Endeavour, and illustrates Cooktown's early developed sense of historical importance.

The site contains an early brick-lined town well, which is important in illustrating the establishment of municipal services in early Cooktown.

The place is important in demonstrating the principal characteristics of a particular class of cultural places.

The monument is a fine example of its type and one of the finest sandstone public memorials in Queensland. It is also an excellent example of the work of the Queensland colonial architect's office under George St Paul Connolly.

The place is important because of its aesthetic significance.

Its aesthetic setting within a grassy, treed reserve contributes significantly to the townscape of Cooktown, and from the Endeavour River estuary is a Cooktown landmark.

The place has a strong or special association with a particular community or cultural group for social, cultural or spiritual reasons.

The place has a special association for the people of Cooktown with their sense of historical identity. A number of other memorials have been placed in the reserve, illustrating this continued association.
