= Mount Perry Powder Magazine =

Former gunpowder magazine at Queensland, Australia

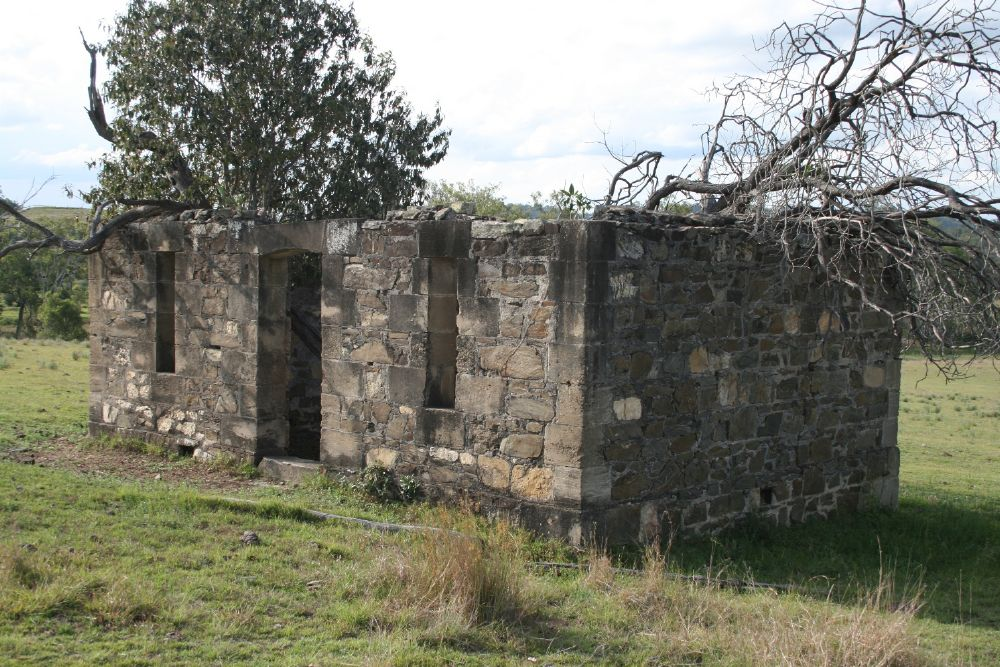
- Mount Perry Powder Magazine, 2008

- Location within Queensland Location within Australia
- 25.1403°S 151.6454°E
- Location: Sandy Camp Road (north of Magazine Road), Mount Perry, North Burnett Region, Queensland, Australia

History
- Design period: 1870s–1890s (late 19th century)
- Built: 1874

Queensland Heritage Register
- Official name: Mount Perry Powder Magazine
- Type: state heritage (built)
- Designated: 10 June 2011
- Reference no.: 602782
- Significant period: 1874–1891
- Builders: Queensland Department of Public Works

Mount Perry Powder Magazine is a heritage-listed former gunpowder magazine at Sandy Camp Road (north of Magazine Road), Mount Perry, North Burnett Region, Queensland, Australia. It was built in 1874 by Queensland Department of Public Works. It was added to the Queensland Heritage Register on 10 June 2011.

== History ==
The stone gunpowder magazine located in a paddock to the east of Sandy Camp Road, about 3.5 kilometres (2.2 mi) north of the town of Mount Perry, was constructed in 1874 to safely store the explosives used in copper mining at Mount Perry and is the oldest known surviving government powder magazine in Queensland.

The Mount Perry area was explored from 1846, and early runs in the district included Yenda and Tenningering (1849) and Mount Perry (1851). Copper was discovered at Mount Perry in mid 1869. On 2 June 1871 the Queensland Surveyor-General directed John C Thompson to complete plans for a township to be known as Perry, later changed to Tenningering. The government town site was ignored by those who wished to live closer to the Mount Perry copper mine, and a town called Fife-Barnett was surveyed on private land half a mile from Tenningering. The government's post and telegraph office had to be moved to Fife-Barnett, which later became known as the township of Mount Perry.

Mount Perry prospered for most of the 1870s, a period when the price of copper was high and mining in general was experiencing rapid growth in Queensland. In 1872 the first churches were built, there were 25 hotels, and mail services commenced. By May 1872 furnaces were operational, producing a regulus (impure metal) consisting of 80% copper, smelted from the poorer ores. Richer ores were dispatched in their crude state. By 1873 the population of Mount Perry was estimated to be 3,000, and a refining furnace was opened that year so that pure copper could be shipped.

The process of construction of the magazine at Mount Perry began in September 1873, when tenders were called by the Department of Public Works. By Christmas 1873 the material for the magazine was being assembled, with erection to begin in a fortnight. Expenditure on erecting the magazine during 1874 amounted to £432/2/10. Jason Walsh was appointed as the Powder Magazine Keeper at Mount Perry on 13 January 1875, at a salary of £100 and on 22 February 1875 notice was given in the Queensland Government Gazette that the powder magazine at Mount Perry was approved as a place where gunpowder could be stored. The rate for storing 50 pounds (23 kg) or more for six weeks was 1 shilling, plus 2 pence for every week thereafter.

The magazine was located on the road to Fortunatus (now Sandy Camp Road) on a 60 acres (24 ha) reserve for a Gunpowder Magazine declared in the Queensland Government Gazette of 18 December 1875. The western boundary of the reserve was the road, the northern boundary was Drummers Creek, and the southern boundary ran along the northern boundary of portion 65 (Magazine Road). The eastern boundary was an extension of the line of the eastern boundary of portion 65.

For over a century, control of all explosives and gunpowder imported into Queensland was the province of the Harbour Master's Department (1860–62), the Department of Ports & Harbours (1862–93), the Marine Department (1894–1928), and the Department of Harbours and Marine (1929–63). In 1964, responsibility was shifted to the Queensland Department of Health. Under The Navigation Act of 1876 the master of any ship entering a Queensland port with gunpowder to be unloaded had to ensure that it was placed in a government magazine. The various incarnations of the Harbours Department were responsible for the provision of magazines and for the safe storage of explosives at Queensland ports of entry. The Act further regulated the conveyance and storage of gunpowder in any place in Queensland, not just in the ports. On the goldfields, magazines were initially administered by the Mines Department, as control of magazines outside ports was not vested in the Marine Department until 1907.

Some common magazine design features include sturdy construction, small windows and solid doors, ventilation and overhanging eaves, timber floors with copper nails or timber pegs instead of iron nails, and the provision of lightning conductors and copper earthing straps. Magazines were generally located away from other buildings, and were sometimes surrounded by earthworks to deflect any blast. Magazine complexes were often surrounded by walls or fences to keep people out.

The Queensland Department of Public Works built powder magazines during the 1860s at Brisbane, Maryborough and Gympie; and during the 1870s at Townsville, Ravenswood, Mount Perry, Millchester, Cooktown (the Cooktown Powder Magazine), Eagle Farm, Thornborough and Maytown. The first magazines at Cairns (on a barge), Charters Towers, Croydon, Georgetown, Herberton, Normanton, Port Douglas and Rockhampton were all built in the 1880s. The magazine at Mount Perry is the earliest government-built magazine known to be surviving in Queensland.

The powder magazine's use was closely tied to the success of mining in the town. Low copper prices meant that the Mount Perry copper mine closed in the second half of 1877. The town stagnated, and the population was only 500 by 1883. At this time the copper mine was being worked on a small scale on tribute (miners working a mine themselves, while sharing profits with the owners), with limited smelting. The owners of the mine eagerly awaited the arrival of the Mount Perry railway line from Bundaberg, which would lower the cost of bringing in firewood for the smelters, and taking out copper.

In August 1877 the Queensland Government approved three railways to connect mining towns to their principal ports: Townsville to Charters Towers; Bundaberg to Mount Perry; and Maryborough to Gympie. However, when the railway reached Mount Perry in 1884, the anticipated mining boom did not occur and copper prices remained low. The mine closed by April 1885, but it reopened in 1888 as prices rose. Mount Perry enjoyed a short revival and by October 1888 the smelting furnaces had been rebuilt and the shafts re-opened by the Mount Perry Copper and Reid's Creek Gold Mining and Smelting Company. After copper prices slumped in April 1889, the mine closed once more. The Mining Warden's Report for 1891 stated "the cessation of the copper works has virtually killed the place [Mount Perry]. All, or all who can obtain employment elsewhere, have left, or are leaving it".

The magazine reserve was cancelled in 1891 (during the mining slump in Mount Perry and a period of economic depression in Queensland in general) along with a 44 acres (18 ha) timber reserve to the north of Drummers Creek, and in 1892 both reserves became part of the 500 acres (200 ha) Agricultural Farm 848 (Portion 5v, later Lot 194).

Within a decade of the closure of the magazine, things had changed. In 1901 the Queensland Copper Company commenced large scale operations at Mount Perry, which boomed in the early 1900s, and the population on the field was about 2,000 in 1904, including 25 Chinese. During this period copper was a major source of mining income for Queensland, and the largest producers included Herberton, Mount Perry, Mount Morgan and Cloncurry.

Between 1900 and 1914, 15,272 long tons (15,517 t) of copper were produced in the Mount Perry area, along with 25,472 ounces (722,100 g) of gold and 767,285 ounces (21,752,200 g) of silver. However, the final crash came before World War I; the mine was closed for the holidays at the end of 1913, and in January 1914 the Queensland Copper Company announced that it would not re-open. Although some mining activity continued under the tribute system, Mount Perry's glory days were over.

After mining at Mount Perry collapsed, there was another dwindling of the town's population and many buildings were demolished or removed. The copper smelter site is now a ruin, with the main surviving feature being the large slag heap. In contrast, the powder magazine north of the township is a rare surviving element of built mining infrastructure from the 1870s boom period at Mount Perry. In 1940 the Deed of Grant for Portion 5v was issued to Edith FE Walsh, the wife of John P Walsh, as Executrix of and sole Legatee under the will of Joseph William Mooney. The farm passed to MW Mooney in 1964 and then to another owner in 1982.

Like the Cooktown powder magazine, which was constructed in 1875–76 for the Department of Ports & Harbours to designs prepared in the office of the Queensland Colonial Architect (FDG Stanley from 1873 to 1881), the Mount Perry powder magazine is a rectangular building with a single doorway and narrow window openings with brick arches. The magazines were also similar in size, Mount Perry being 6.9 metres (23 ft) long by 5.4 metres (18 ft) wide, and Cooktown being 7.9 by 4.6 metres (26 by 15 ft). However, the Cooktown magazine is built of brick, on a stone plinth.

Both magazines also had timber floors, although only the joist-holes in the lower walls remain at Mount Perry; and both have wall vents to the sub-floor area. Although Mount Perry no longer has a roof, it is likely that it had overhanging eaves, as was the case at Cooktown. It is also possible that, like Cooktown, its timber door and window shutters (no longer extant) were faced in copper. The Cooktown magazine received a new roof in 1996, and in 2009 it qualified for a Q150 grant of $150,000 for restoration work.

== Description ==
Located to the east of Sandy Camp Road, between Magazine Road in the south and Drummers Creek in the north, the powder magazine stands alone in a paddock. In late 2008, two trees were growing inside the roofless structure.

The magazine is 6.9 metres (23 ft) long (south-western and north-eastern elevations) and 5.4 metres (18 ft) wide, its walls being 50 centimetres (20 in) thick. It is constructed of random rubble brought to courses, with rendered quoining to the corners of the building and around the exterior of the windows and the door. There are brick arches above some of the windows with timber lintels. There is a door and two windows in the south-western elevation, plus two windows in north-eastern elevation.

The interior walls on the south-western and north-eastern elevations have recesses for floor joists, but the timber floor no longer exists. Wall vents are set below the floor level, about level with the joist holes; with two vents in each of the long elevations, and one in each of the short elevations. There are some small holes in the wall set with copper plates, and some copper piping juts out of a wall. Some timber framing survives in one of the window interiors.

== Heritage listing ==
Mount Perry Powder Magazine was listed on the Queensland Heritage Register on 10 June 2011 having satisfied the following criteria.

The place is important in demonstrating the evolution or pattern of Queensland's history.

The Mount Perry Powder Magazine, built by the Queensland Government in 1874, is a rare surviving relic of the Mount Perry copper mining boom period of the 1870s. This decade was a period of rapid expansion of mining in Queensland, and Mount Perry was an important mining centre during most of the 1870s, and then again between 1901 and 1913.

The economic importance to Queensland of mining at Mount Perry was illustrated by its selection in 1877 as the destination of one of three mining-related railway lines approved by the Queensland Government.

The place demonstrates rare, uncommon or endangered aspects of Queensland's cultural heritage.

The Mount Perry Powder Magazine is rare as one of three known surviving 19th century government powder magazines in Queensland; and it is also the oldest known example. In addition it is a rare surviving example of built mining infrastructure from the heyday of Mount Perry.

The place is important in demonstrating the principal characteristics of a particular class of cultural places.

Despite its incomplete state, lacking floors and roof, the solidly constructed walls of the 1874 Mount Perry Powder Magazine, its narrow windows and remnant copper fittings, are all standard features of Queensland government powder magazines of the 19th century; and its isolated location demonstrates the practice of locating gunpowder at a safe distance from population centres.
