= Shire of Daintree =

Former local government area in Far North Queensland, Australia

Coordinates: 14.82°S 144.56°E

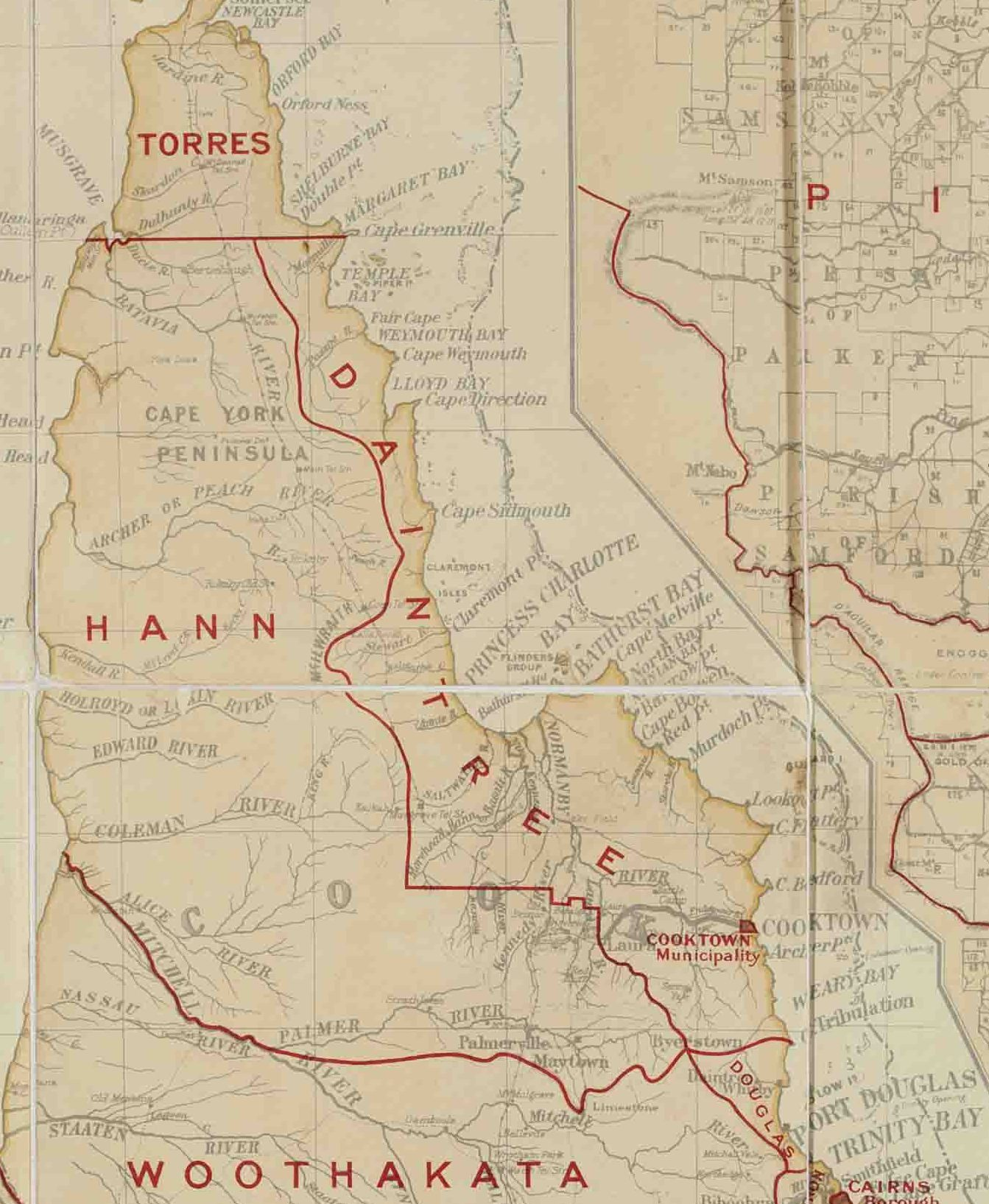
Map of Daintree Division and adjacent local government areas, March 1902

The Shire of Daintree is a former local government area in Far North Queensland, Australia. It comprised the coastal strip surrounding Cooktown but excluded the town itself which had been established as the Borough of Cooktown in 1886.

== History ==
The Daintree Division was created on 11 November 1879 as one of 74 divisions around Queensland under the Divisional Boards Act 1879 with a population of 4226.

With the passage of the Local Authorities Act 1902, the Daintree Division became the Shire of Daintree on 31 March 1903.

On 16 January 1919, the Shire of Daintree and the Shire of Hann merged to form the Shire of Cook.
