= Shire of Hann =

Former local government area in Far North Queensland, Australia

Coordinates: 16.056°S 144.283°E

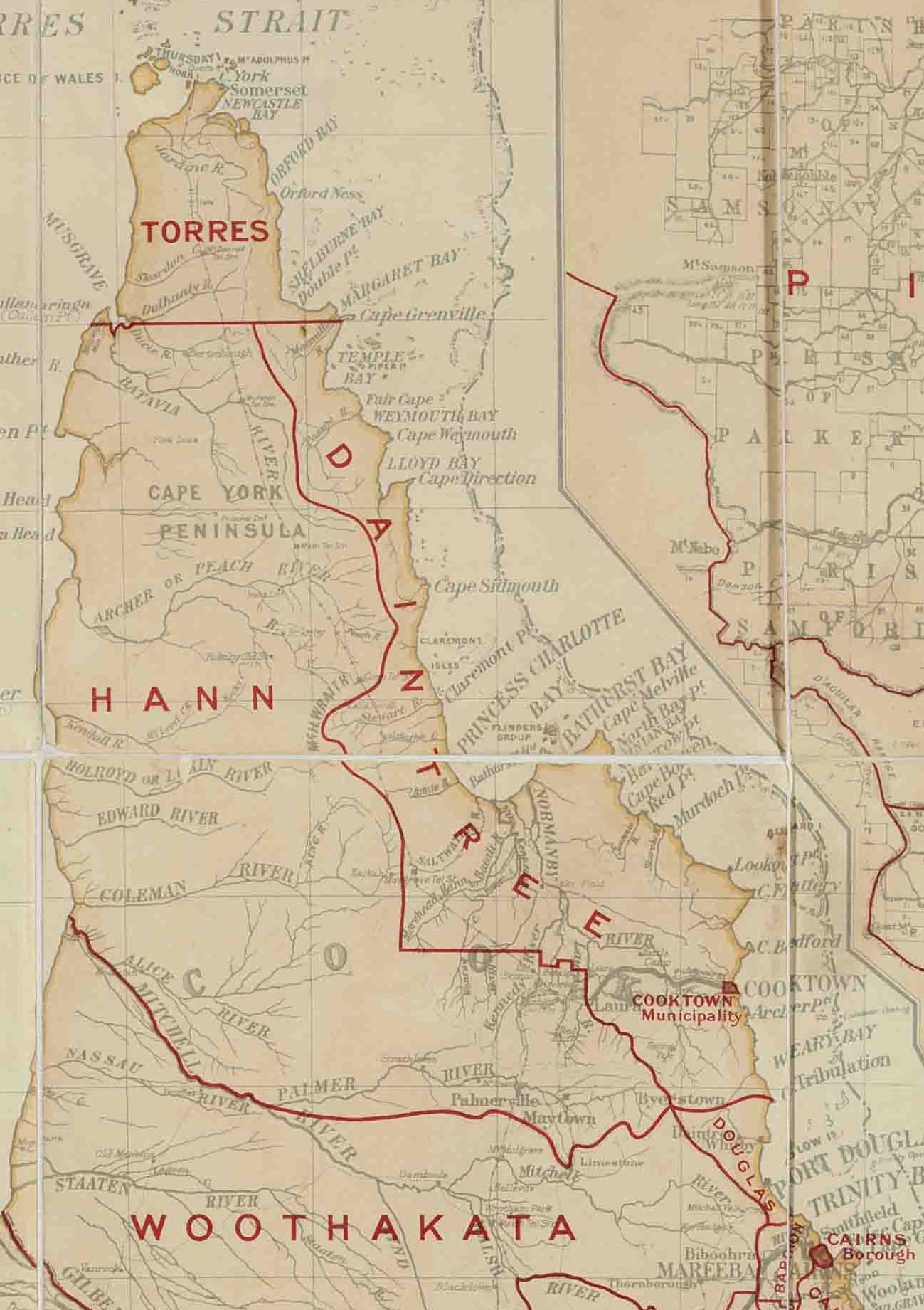
Map of Hann Division and adjacent local government areas, March 1902

The Shire of Hann is a former local government area in Far North Queensland, Australia.

== History ==
The Hann Division was created on 11 November 1879 as one of 74 divisions around Queensland under the Divisional Boards Act 1879 with a population of 10167. Its administrative centre was Maytown.

On 30 October 1885, the coastal islands of the Hann Division was separated to create the new Torres Division.

With the passage of the Local Authorities Act 1902, the Hann Division became the Shire of Hann on 31 March 1903.

On 16 January 1919, the Shire of Hann and the Shire of Daintree merged to form the Shire of Cook.
