= Town of Cooktown =

Local government area of Queensland, Australia

Coordinates: 15.41°S 145.26°E

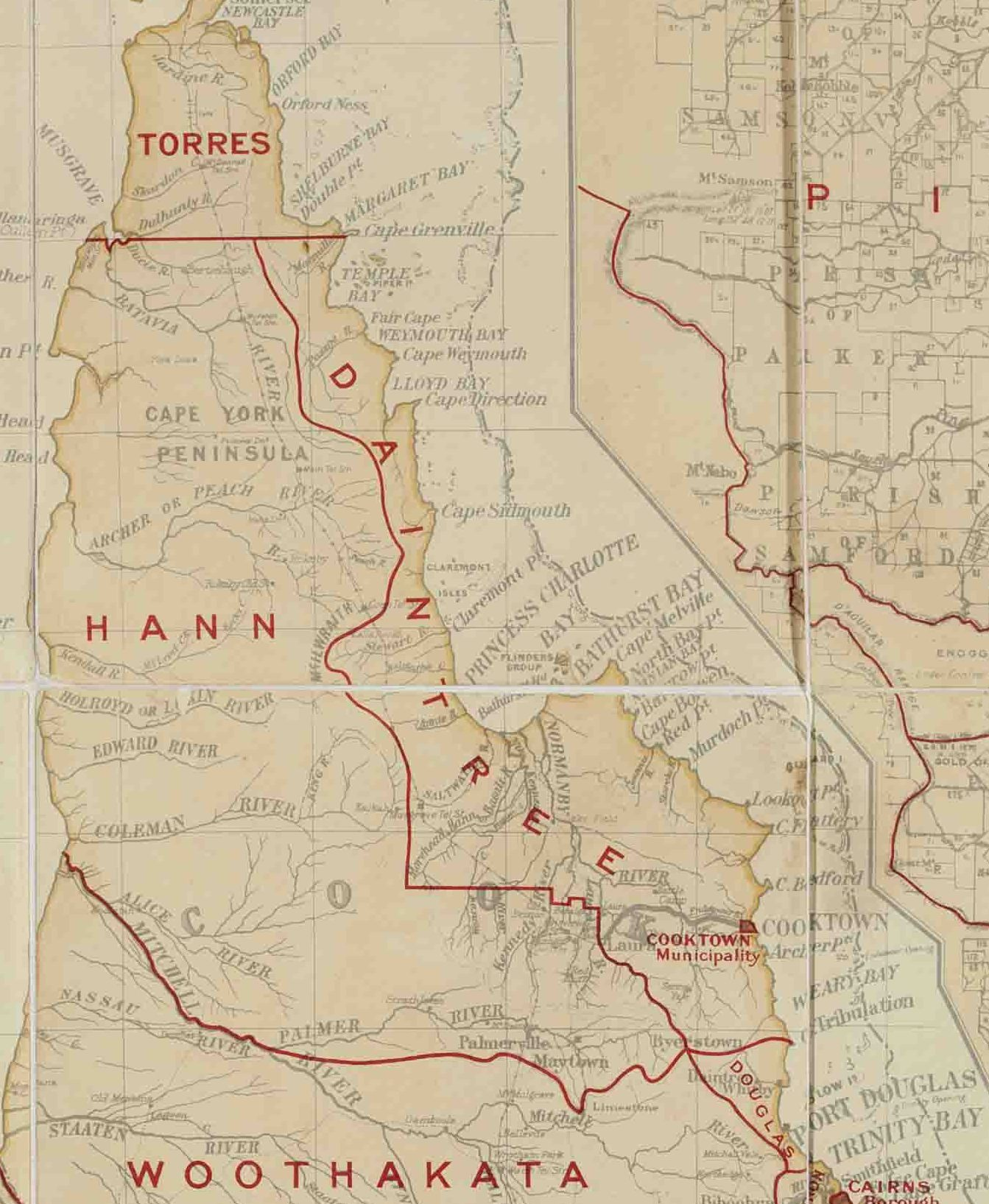
Map of Borough of Cooktown and adjacent local government areas, March 1902

The Town of Cooktown is the former local government area for Cooktown in Far North Queensland, Australia. It existed from 1876 to 1932.

== History ==
On 3 April 1876, Cooktown was established as a separate municipality, the Borough of Cooktown.

On 11 November 1879, the Daintree was created as a local government for the coastal land surrounding Cooktown.

On 31 March 1903 with the passage of the Local Authorities Act 1902, the Borough of Cooktown became the Town of Cooktown and the Daintree Division became the Shire of Daintree.

On 16 January 1919, the Shire of Daintree was merged with the Shire of Hann to create the Shire of Cook, covering much of Cape York Peninsula.

On 4 August 1932, the Town of Cooktown was abolished and absorbed into the Shire of Cook.

== Mayors ==
The mayors of the town were:

- 1876–1877: John Walsh
- 1878: Hector Menzies
- 1879: S. Samper
- 1880: Andrew Thredgold
- 1881: Robert Baird
- 1882: John Davis
- 1883: F.C. Hodel
- 1884–1885: Edward D'Arcy
- 1886–1887: John Davis
- 1888: James Savage, or John Davis
- 1889–1890: John Davis
- 1891: ????
- 1892: J. Young
- 1893: J. Clunn, junior
- 1894–1895: J.L. Adams
- 1896: W.T. Sleep
- 1897: J.B. Martin
- 1898–1901: P. E. Seagren
- 1902–1903: J.H. Hargreaves
- 1904: G. Fellows and J.H. Hargreaves
- 1905–1908: P.E. Seagren
- 1909–1911: George A. Love
- 1912: W.P Anderson
- 1913–1917: George A. Love
- 1918–1922: ????
- 1923: A. S. Sampson
- 1924–1925: S.J. Keane
- 1926: ????
- 1927: Stephen John Keane
- 1928: J. Martin
- 1929: Henry Lee
