= Cooktown Powder Magazine =

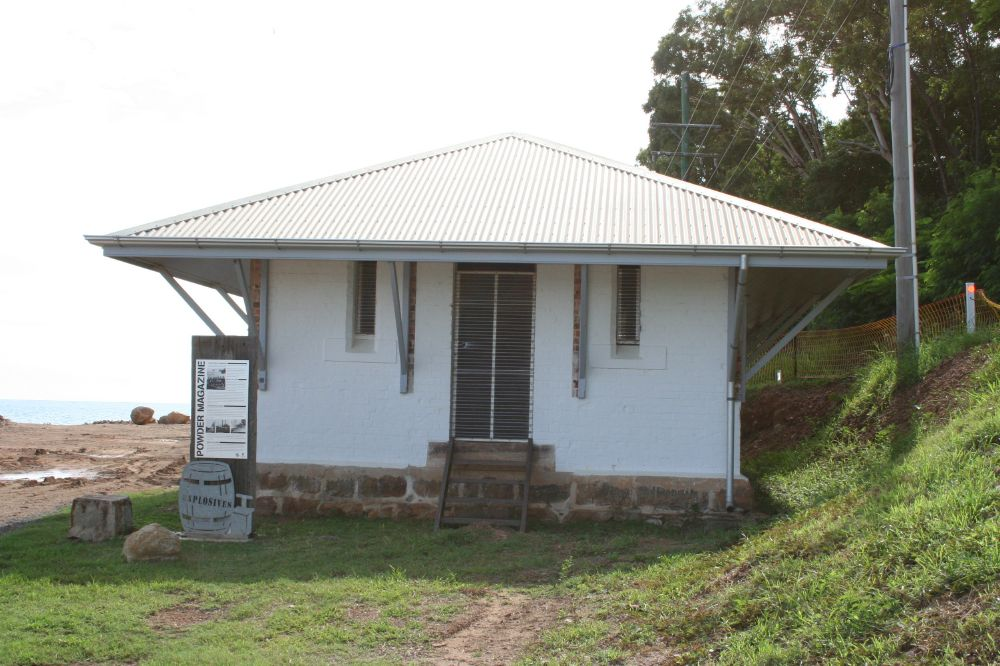
- Cooktown Powder Magazine, 2010

- Location within Queensland Location within Australia
- 15.4576°S 145.2539°E
- Location: Webber Esplanade, Cooktown, Shire of Cook, Queensland, Australia

History
- Design period: 1870s–1890s (late 19th century)
- Built: 1875–1876

Site notes
- Architect: Francis Drummond Greville Stanley

Queensland Heritage Register
- Official name: Cooktown Powder Magazine
- Type: state heritage (built)
- Designated: 21 October 1992
- Reference no.: 600425
- Significant period: 1875–1876 (fabric); 1876–1976 (historical)
- Builders: Henry J Meldrum

Cooktown Powder Magazine is a heritage-listed gunpowder magazine at Webber Esplanade, Cooktown, Shire of Cook, Queensland, Australia. It was designed by Francis Drummond Greville Stanley and built from 1875 to 1876 by Henry J Meldrum. It was added to the Queensland Heritage Register on 21 October 1992.

== History ==
The Cooktown Powder Magazine was constructed in 1875–76 for the Queensland Department of Ports & Harbours by Cooktown contractor Henry J Meldrum, working to designs prepared in the office of the Queensland colonial architect, FDG Stanley. It remains one of the earliest known surviving powder magazines in Queensland.

For over a century, from 1860 to 1963, control of all explosives and gunpowder imported into Queensland was the province of the Harbour Master's Department (1860–62), the Department of Ports & Harbours (1862–93), the Marine Department (1894–1928), and the Department of Harbours and Marine (1929–63). In 1964, responsibility was shifted to the Queensland Department of Health. Under The Navigation Act 1876, the master of any ship entering a Queensland port with gunpowder to be unloaded, had to ensure that it was placed in a government magazine. The Ports & Harbours Department therefore was responsible for the provision of magazines and for the safe storage of explosives at Queensland ports of entry. The Act further regulated the conveyance and storage of gunpowder in any place in Queensland, not just in the ports.

From the late 1860s, government magazines were being erected at the principal ports and goldfields of Queensland. On the goldfields, magazines were administered by the Mines Department; control of magazines other than in ports was not vested in the Marine Department until 1907, under the provisions of the Explosives Act 1906. Magazines were constructed of stone, brick, timber, iron or concrete, often dependent on the local availability of materials. At some ports, floating magazines were utilised. By 1900, magazines under the control of the Marine Department were situated at Brisbane, Maryborough, Bundaberg, Gladstone, Rockhampton, Bowen, Townsville, Cairns, Cooktown and Normanton.

Construction of the Cooktown Powder Magazine in the mid-1870s was closely associated with the anticipated exploitation of the gold-bearing reefs of the Palmer River district, following the initial rush to the Palmer in 1873–74. Cooktown had been established in October 1873 as the Endeavour River port for the Palmer, and developed almost overnight as a supply and administrative centre. Within six months of its establishment, the town had 20 restaurants, 12 large and 20 smaller stores, 6 butchers, 5 bakers, 3 tinsmiths, and chemists, fancy-goods shops, watchmakers, bootmakers and saddlers; 65 publican's licenses had been issued for the Cooktown–Palmer River district, with 30 more applied for by April 1874. There was an estimated 3,000 floating population in the town itself, and thousands of men en route to the goldfields. Two Cooktown newspapers were established in 1874, a state school, customs house, court house, and several churches were erected by 1875, and the town was declared a municipality on 5 April 1876. The 1876 census revealed a population of over 9,200 persons on the Palmer River goldfields, and the town of Cooktown had a population of just under 2,200.

Considering the increasing use of explosives on the Palmer by 1875, and the inherent threat to public safety generated by the storage of explosives in local Cooktown warehouses, the Department of Public Works called tenders for a powder magazine at Cooktown in July 1875. The contract, which was for a brick store 26 by 15 feet (7.9 by 4.6 m), roofed with galvanised iron and surrounded at a distance of 25 feet (7.6 m) by a 7 feet (2.1 m) high timber fence, was won in September 1875 by HJ Meldrum, with a price of £590. For safety reasons, the structure was to be located at the rocks by the sea at the northern edge of Grassy Hill, a considerable distance from the pilot station. Operation of the magazine was the responsibility of the local Harbour Master.

The building was completed by late January 1876. It was constructed of imported bricks, with windows stone faced and fitted with copper- faced shutters. The large hardwood door into the building was also coppered from the outside, and there appears to have been a sloping platform leading up to this door. The roof overhung the structure 4 feet (1.2 m) all around and had earthed lightning conductors. The interior had a hardwood floor with trestles on which the powder was stored about a foot above the flooring. No nails were used in the construction – all the timber work was pegged with wooden pegs – and any necessary metal fastenings were of copper. There was an 8 feet (2.4 m) high paling fence surrounding the building – this sustained severe white ant damage within a few years, and was replaced in 1883 with a galvanised iron fence.

When completed in January 1876, the Cooktown magazine was accessible only by boat. Local agitation led to a road being made along the seafront to the magazine, and Webber Esplanade was extended around the northern edge of Grassy Hill in the mid-1880s. By the late 1880s a number of dwellings had been erected at the base of Grassy Hill in the vicinity of the magazine, and the local volunteer defence force had installed a gun nearby. Despite an 1889 recommendation by Foreman McMillan of the Works Department that the magazine be removed two or three miles up the railway line from the port, this did not eventuate. Treasury funds for the removal were allocated in 1890, but by mid-1891 Queensland had entered a severe economic depression, and the funding was curtailed.

From the mid-1880s alluvial output from the Palmer River goldfields declined, and money to develop the extensive reefs in the district was not forthcoming. By 1894 the amount of explosives stored in the Cooktown Powder Magazine was very small, and little was being expended on maintaining the building. In 1907 repairs to the roof sheeting, roof framing, batteries and fence were carried out.

By May 1941 most of the iron fence had collapsed. Much of the sheeting had already been removed, and the Harbour Master was making arrangements to offer the remaining sheets for sale.

The building and site (218 square metres (2,350 sq ft)) were transferred to the National Trust of Queensland by Deed of Grant dated 25 March 1976, upon trust for Museum (Historic Relic) Purposes. In 1992 the National Trust, with local council and community support, removed the old roof, which was unsafe. This was replaced in 1996, and a programme of conservation and restoration of the brickwork commenced.

In 2006, erosion of the foreshore left the building teetering on the edge of the foreshore. The Queensland Government gave approval for foreshore reclamation and the construction of a rock wall to prevent further erosion.

== Description ==
The magazine is situated above high water mark, away from the centre of Cooktown, at the northern edge of Grassy Hill at the mouth of the Endeavour River. Its isolated location by the water's edge makes it a landmark, particularly when viewed from the estuary.

The building is single-storeyed and rectangular and contains one room with a door facing west. There are slit windows on the southern, eastern and western elevations. Wide openings have been roughly made in the north and south walls but signs of the earlier narrow openings remain. There is a new roof – timber framed with corrugated iron cladding – constructed in 1996, in the form of the original.

The Magazine is built of brick on a stone plinth with a dilapidated timber floor pegged into joists. The walls have in the past been white washed inside and out. Timber joinery is missing. There is no visible evidence above ground of the early fence, paths or landing.

== Heritage listing ==
Cooktown Powder Magazine was listed on the Queensland Heritage Register on 21 October 1992 having satisfied the following criteria.

The place is important in demonstrating the evolution or pattern of Queensland's history.

The Cooktown Powder Magazine is significant for its historical association with the development of the rich Palmer River goldfields in the mid-1870s, and survives as poignant evidence of the establishment of Cooktown as the principal administrative centre and supply port for the Palmer at this period.

The place demonstrates rare, uncommon or endangered aspects of Queensland's cultural heritage.

It is rare as one of the few government buildings surviving from Cooktown's establishment phase, and as one of the earliest known surviving Government powder magazines in Queensland.

The place has potential to yield information that will contribute to an understanding of Queensland's history.

As an 1870s brick powder magazine of standard proportions it remains a good example of its type and has the potential to contribute significantly to any future study of Queensland powder magazines.

The place is important in demonstrating the principal characteristics of a particular class of cultural places.

The place contains good evidence of 1870s construction techniques for this special type of building use - especially the pegged timber floors, heavy hardwood framing, and small windows. As an 1870s brick powder magazine of standard proportions it remains a good example of its type and has the potential to contribute significantly to any future study of Queensland powder magazines.

The place is important because of its aesthetic significance.

The building, isolated by the water's edge at the northern edge of Grassy Hill, is a Cooktown landmark, particularly when viewed from the estuary approach to the town.

The place has a strong or special association with a particular community or cultural group for social, cultural or spiritual reasons.

The place is valued by the local community for its historical association with Cooktown's past and as a tourist attraction, and by the present owners, the National Trust of Queensland, for its rarity and historical, typological, technological and landmark values.
