= Beerwah railway station =

Railway station in Queensland, Australia

Beerwah
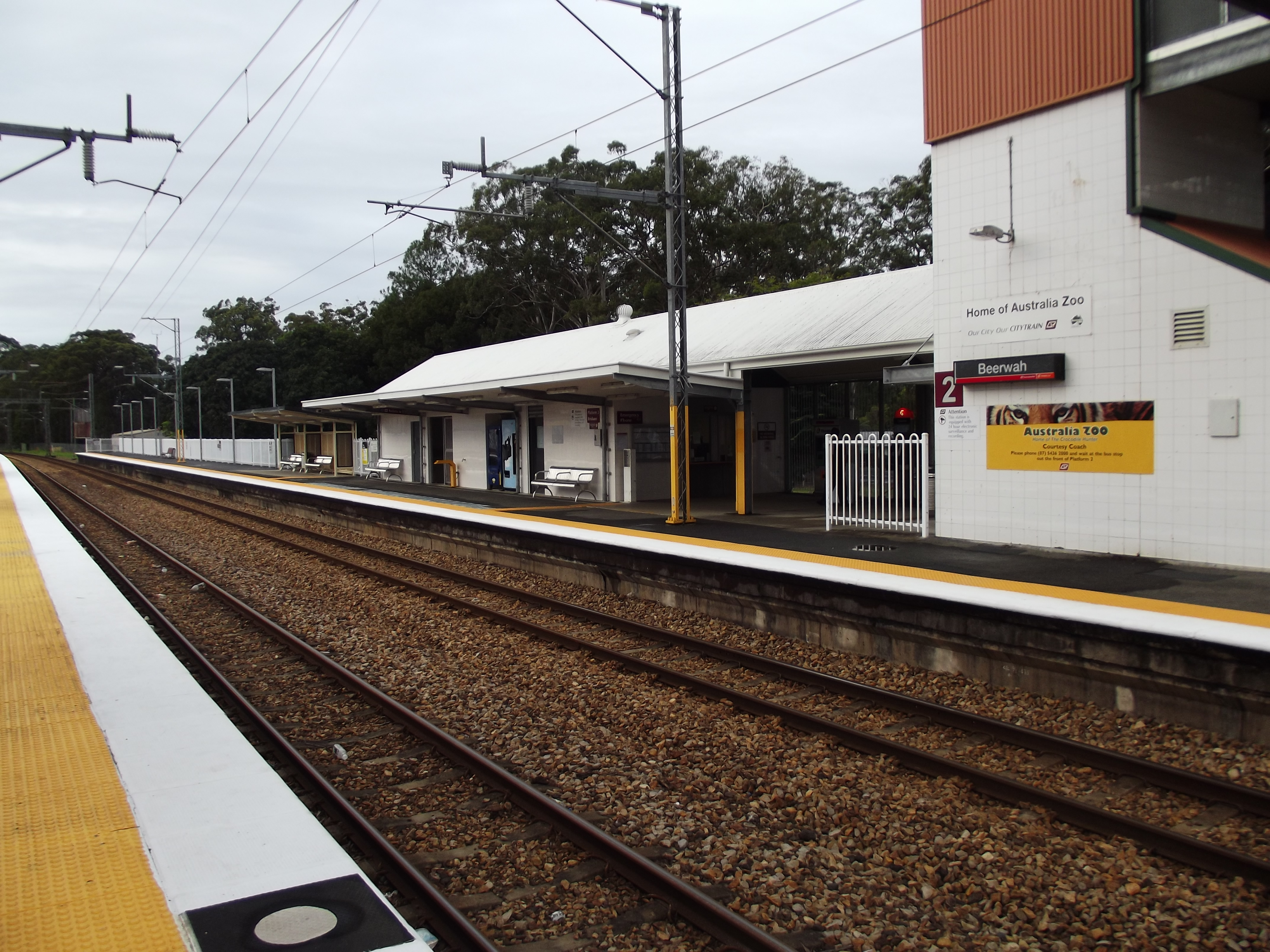
- Northbound view from Platform 1 in June 2012

General information
- Location: Beerwah Parade, Beerwah
- Coordinates: 26.8573°S 152.9577°E
- Owner: Queensland Rail
- Operator: Queensland Rail
- Line: T1 Nambour/Gympie North
- Distance: 75.88 kilometres from Central
- Platforms: 2 side
- Tracks: 2

Construction
- Structure type: Ground
- Parking: 26 spaces
- Accessible: Yes

Other information
- Status: Staffed part-time
- Station code: 600485 (platform 1); 600486 (platform 2)
- Fare zone: Zone 5
- Website: Queensland Rail

History
- Opened: 1890; 136 years ago

Services
Preceding station	Queensland Rail	Following station
Glasshouse Mountains towards Ipswich or Rosewood via Roma Street	T1 Nambour/Gympie North line	Landsborough towards Nambour or Gympie North
Location

Beerwah is a railway station operated by Queensland Rail on the Nambour/Gympie North line. It opened in 1890 and serves the Sunshine Coast town of Beerwah. It is a ground level station, featuring two side platforms.

== History ==
Due to white-ant damage to the old building, the station underwent a major facelift with construction of a new station office, waiting shelters, bus shelters and carpark.

== Services ==
Beerwah is serviced by Citytrain network services to Brisbane, Nambour and Gympie North. To relieve congestion on the single track North Coast line, the rail service is supplemented by a bus service operated by Kangaroo Bus Lines on weekdays between Caboolture and Nambour as route 649.

== Services by platform ==
Beerwah platform arrangement
Platform	Lines	Destinations	Notes
1	T1 Nambour/Gympie North	Nambour or Gympie North	
1	T1 Nambour/Gympie North	Roma Street (to Ipswich/Rosewood line)	
2	T1 Nambour/Gympie North	Nambour or Gympie North	
2	T1 Nambour/Gympie North	Roma Street (to Ipswich/Rosewood line)	

== Future ==
Beerwah is the proposed junction for the Maroochydore railway line outlined under the South East Queensland Infrastructure Plan and Program. The North Coast line from Beerburrum to Landsborough is scheduled to be duplicated by 2021.
