= Palmwoods railway station =

Railway station in Queensland, Australia

Palmwoods
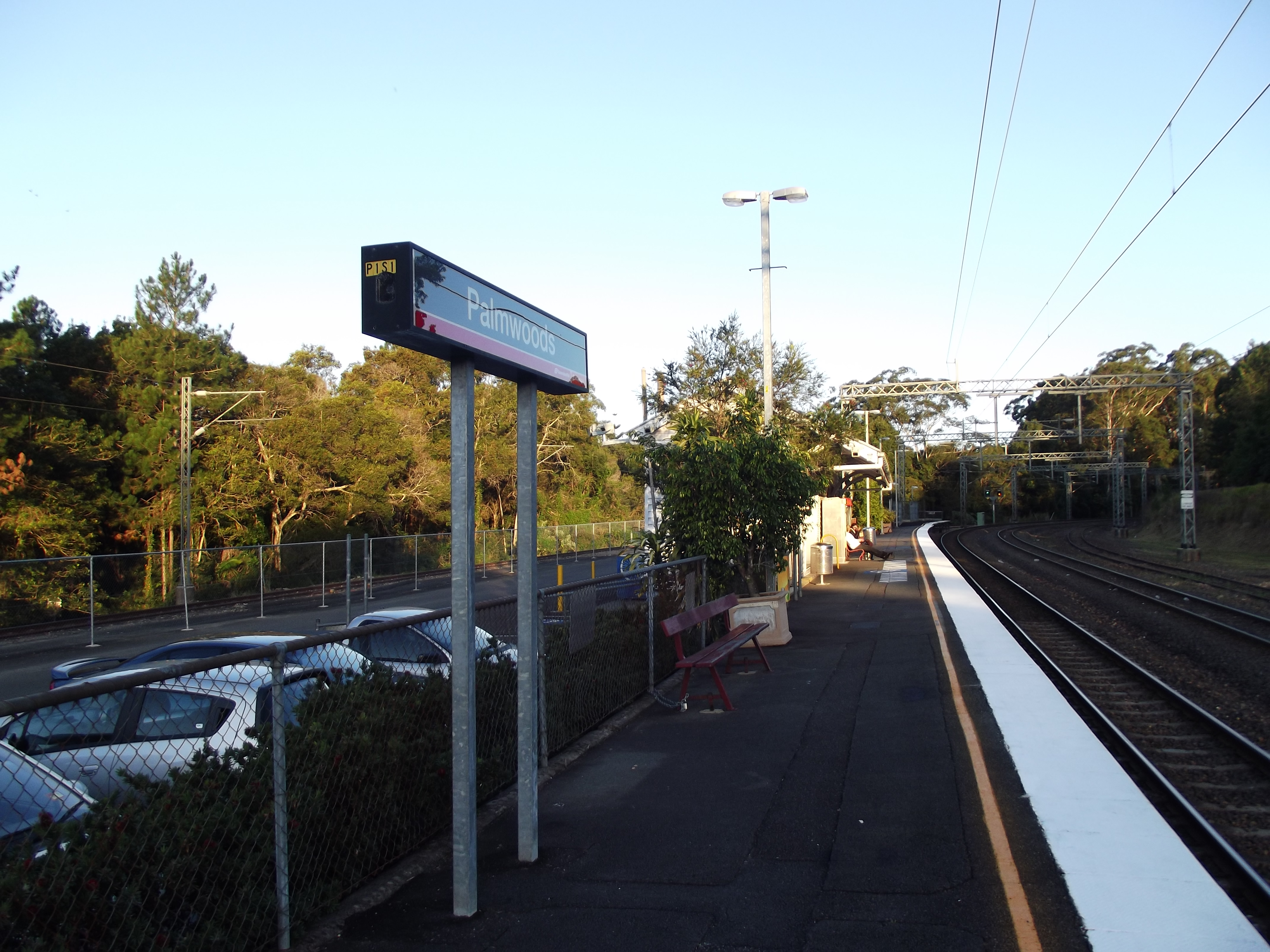
- Southbound view from the station platform in July 2012

General information
- Location: Chevallum Road, Palmwoods
- Coordinates: 26°41′19″S 152°57′38″E
- Owner: Queensland Rail
- Operator: Queensland Rail
- Line: T1 Nambour/Gympie North
- Distance: 96.25 kilometres from Central
- Platforms: 1
- Tracks: 4

Construction
- Structure type: Ground

Other information
- Status: Staffed morning peak
- Station code: railway station 600491
- Fare zone: Zone 6
- Website: Queensland Rail

History
- Opened: 1891; 135 years ago

Services
Preceding station	Queensland Rail	Following station
Eudlo towards Ipswich or Rosewood via Roma Street	T1 Nambour/Gympie North line	Woombye towards Nambour or Gympie North
Location

Palmwoods is a railway station operated by Queensland Rail on the Nambour/Gympie North line. It opened in 1891 and serves the Sunshine Coast town of Palmwoods. It is a ground level station, featuring one side platform.

== History ==
Palmwoods station opened in 1891. The station today consists of one platform with a wooden structure. In 2009, the platform was extended at both its northern and southern ends with scaffolding and plywood materials. Initially intended as an interim arrangement until a permanent extension was built, the temporary platform remains.

Palmwoods has two passing loops on its western side, with one disused, as well as another that runs behind the platform on its eastern side.

== Services ==
Palmwoods is serviced by Citytrain network services to Brisbane, Nambour and Gympie North. To relieve congestion on the single track North Coast line, the rail service is supplemented by a bus service operated by Kangaroo Bus Lines on weekdays between Caboolture and Nambour as route 649.

== Services by platform ==
Palmwoods platform arrangement
Platform	Line	Destinations	Notes
1	T1 Nambour/Gympie North	Nambour or Gympie North	
1	T1 Nambour/Gympie North	Roma Street (to Ipswich/Rosewood line)	

== Transport links ==
Kangaroo Bus Lines operates one bus route that services Palmwoods station:

- 649: Caboolture

Kinetic Sunshine Coast operates one bus route that services Palmwoods station:

- 638: Nambour via Woombye

== See also ==
- List of tramways in Queensland
