= Eudlo railway station =

Railway station in Queensland, Australia

Eudlo
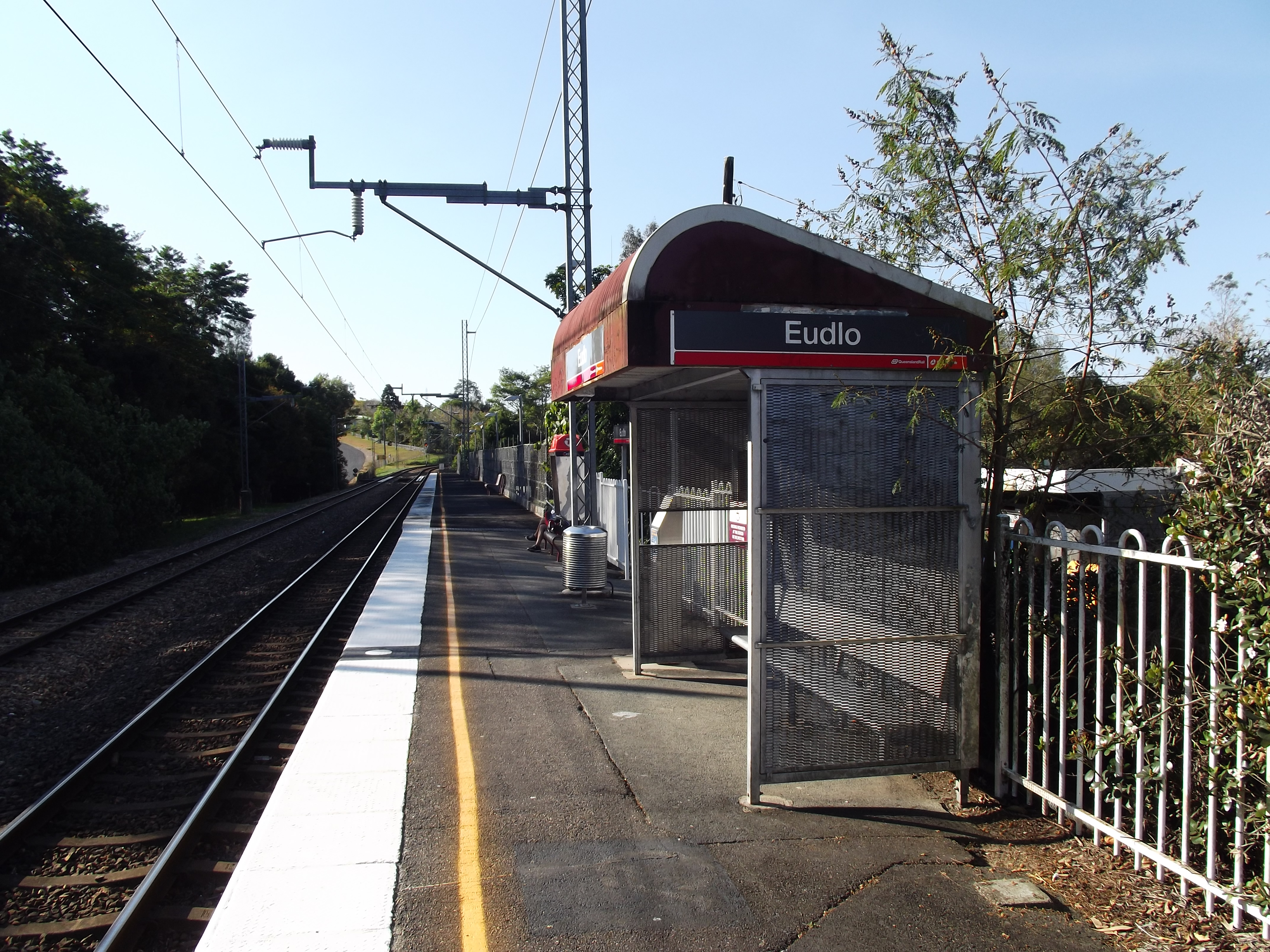
- Northbound view from the station in September 2012

General information
- Location: Rosebed Street, Eudlo
- Coordinates: 26°43′32.21″S 152°57′23.3″E
- Owner: Queensland Rail
- Operator: Queensland Rail
- Line: T1 Nambour/Gympie North
- Distance: 91.66 kilometres from Central
- Platforms: 1
- Tracks: 2

Construction
- Structure type: Ground
- Cycle facilities: No
- Accessible: Yes

Other information
- Status: Unstaffed
- Station code: 600490
- Fare zone: Zone 5
- Website: Queensland Rail

History
- Opened: 1891; 135 years ago

Services
Preceding station	Queensland Rail	Following station
Mooloolah towards Ipswich or Rosewood via Roma Street	T1 Nambour/Gympie North line	Palmwoods towards Nambour or Gympie North
Location

Eudlo is a railway station operated by Queensland Rail on the Nambour/Gympie North line. It opened in 1891 and serves the Sunshine Coast town of Eudlo. It is a ground level station, featuring one side platform.

It is one of a small number of stations that can only fit four carriages onto the platform.

== History ==
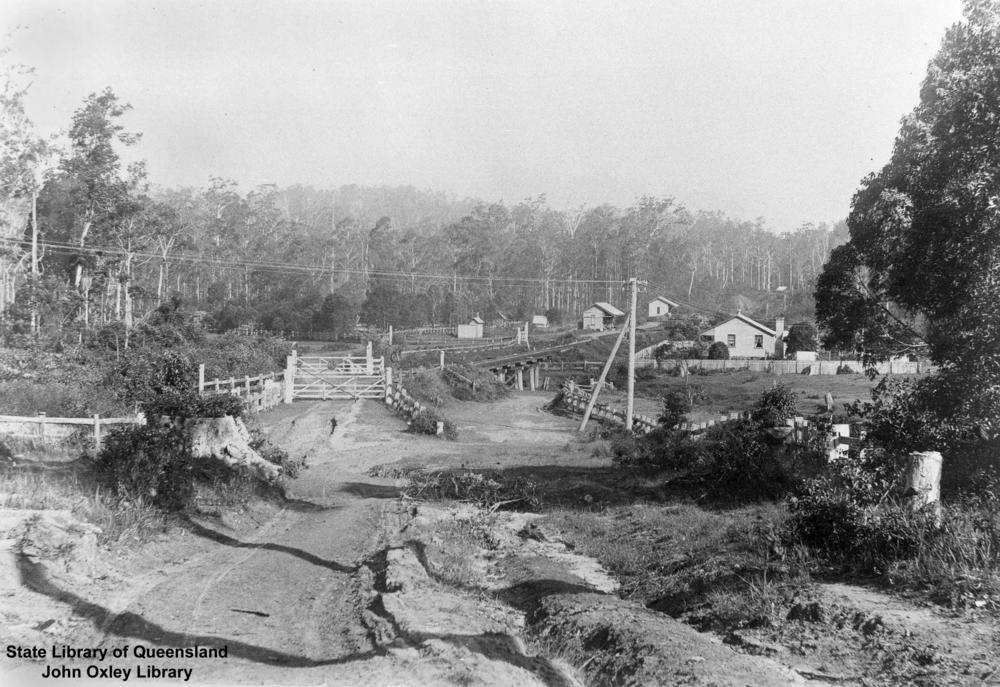
View over the Eudlo railway station, 1907

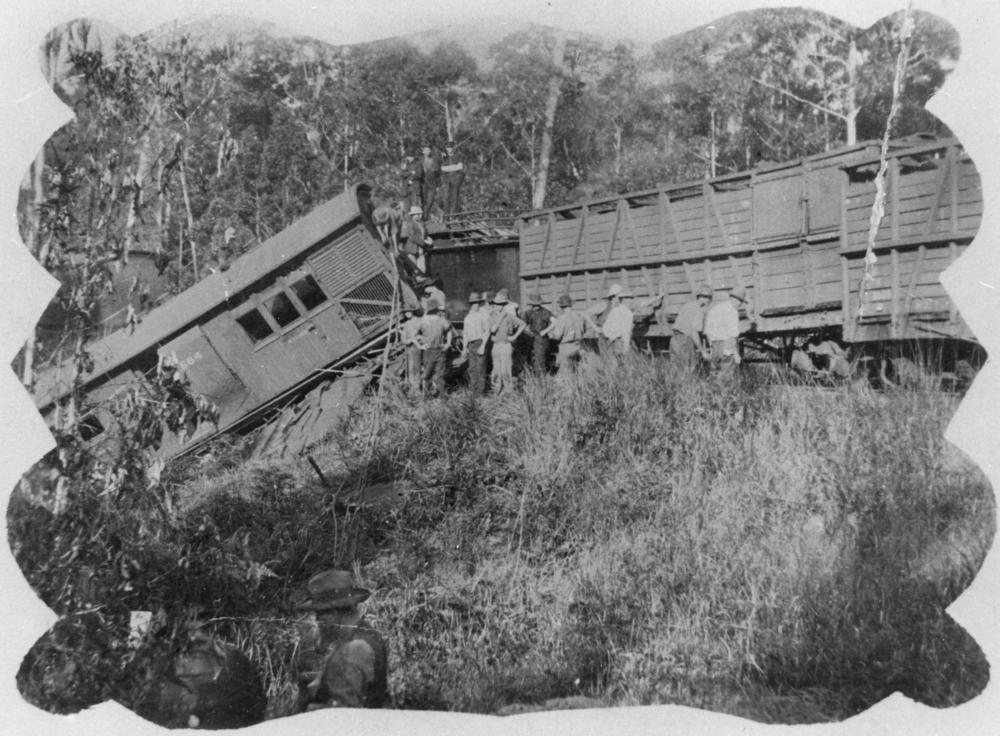
Derailed goods train at Eudlo, 1914

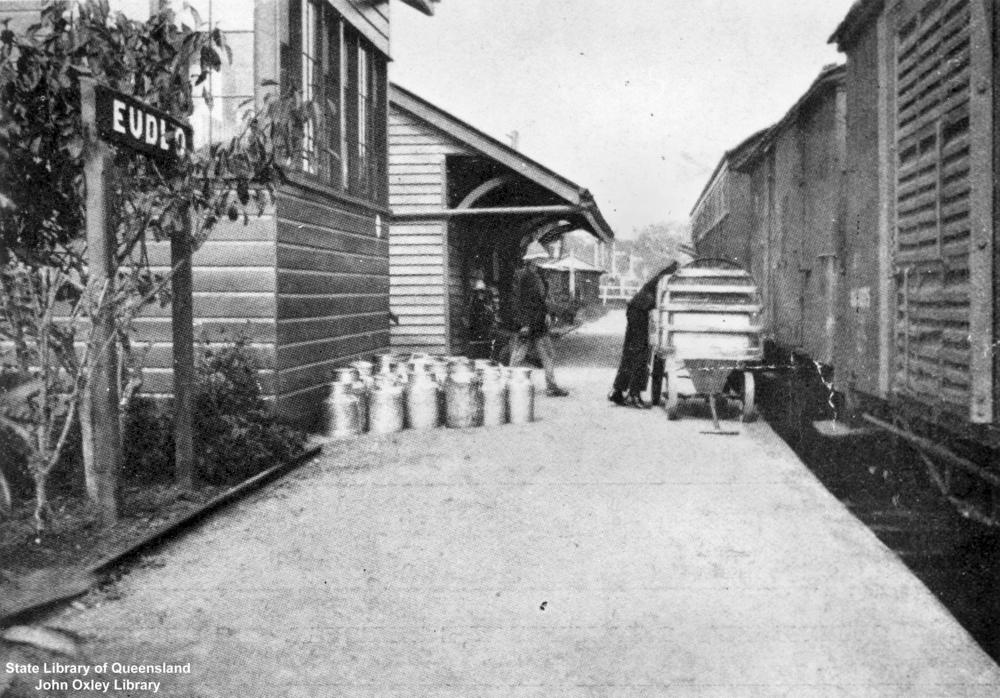
Cream cans standing on the platform of the Eudlo railway station, 1932

Eudlo railway station opened in 1891 as part of the section of the North Coast railway line from Landsborough to Yandina.

In 1908, two goods trains collided in Yandina due to a signalling error.

In 1911, a railway worker riding a railway tricycle was struck by a train. Although the tricycle was described as "smashed to atoms", the worker was not seriously injured. In 1912, two trains collided, derailing one of them.

In 1924, a number of carriages were derailed from a goods train.

In 1931, a wagon carrying petrol was derailed. In 1933, there was a head-on collision of the Townsville Express (a passenger train) and a goods train, derailing the parlour car and the sleeping cars of the passenger train.

On 2 September 1939, a passenger train was waiting at the Eudlo station for a freight train to pass, when a failure of the points resulted in the freight train colliding head-on with the passenger train. Realising the collision was imminent, the fireman of the freight train jumped from the train but was killed by a wagon that overturned onto him. Fourteen other railway crew and passengers were injured.

In 1942, eleven wagons were smashed when an axle broke.

In 2009, the platform was extended at its northern end with scaffolding and plywood materials. Initially intended as an interim arrangement until a permanent extension was built, the temporary platform remains. Opposite the platform lies a passing loop.

== Services ==
Eudlo is serviced by Citytrain network services to Brisbane, Nambour and Gympie North. To relieve congestion on the single track North Coast line, the rail service is supplemented by a bus service operated by Kangaroo Bus Lines on weekdays between Caboolture and Nambour as route 649.

== Services by platform ==
Eudlo platform arrangement
Platform	Line	Destinations	Notes
1	T1 Nambour/Gympie North	Nambour or Gympie North	
1	T1 Nambour/Gympie North	Roma Street (to Ipswich/Rosewood line)	
