= Glasshouse Mountains railway station =

Railway station in Queensland, Australia

Glasshouse Mountains
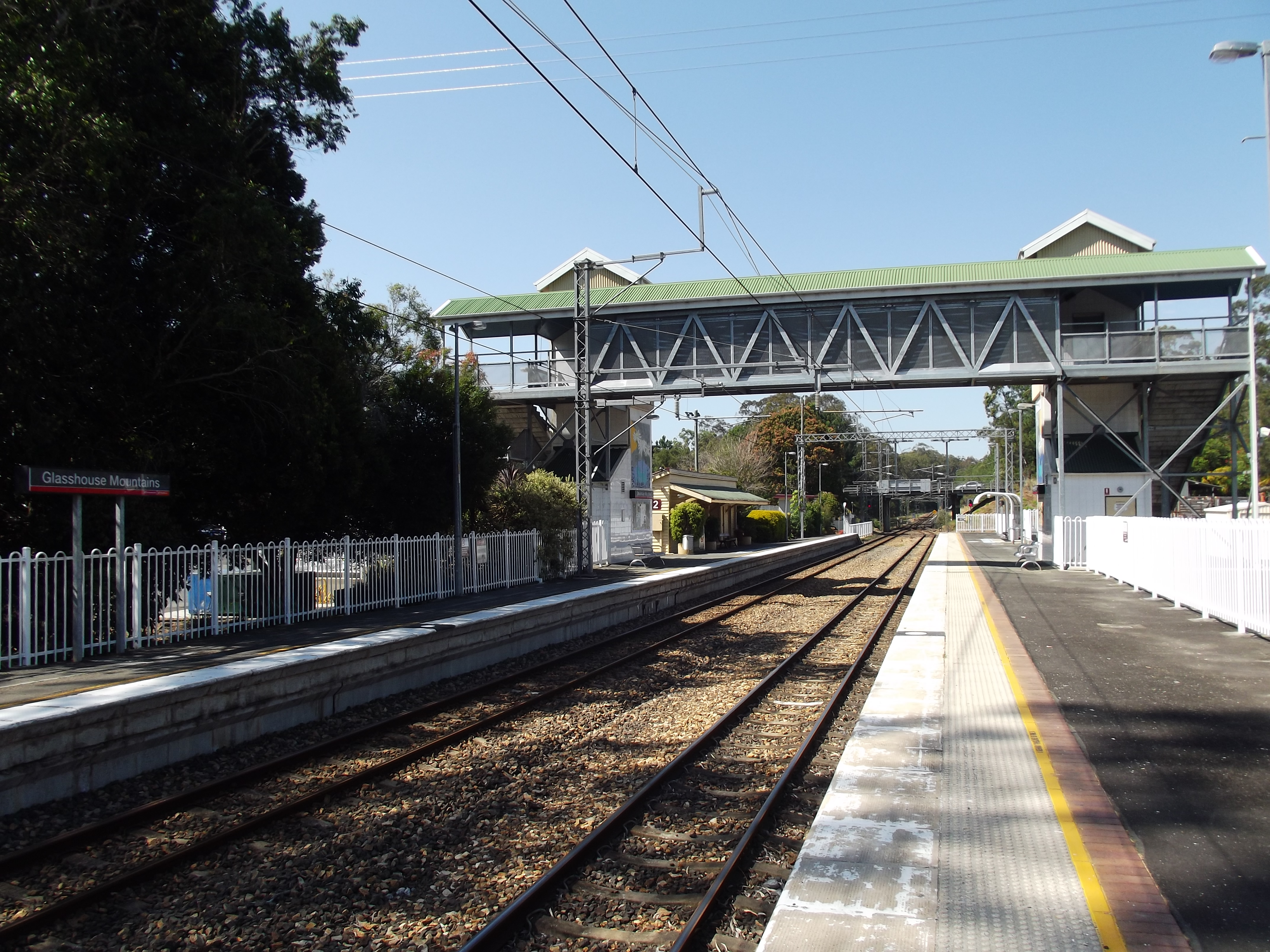
- Southbound view from Platform 1 in September 2012

General information
- Location: Reed Street, Glass House Mountains
- Coordinates: 26°53′57″S 152°57′20″E
- Owner: Queensland Rail
- Operator: Queensland Rail
- Line: T1 Nambour/Gympie North
- Distance: 70.82 kilometres from Central
- Platforms: 2 side
- Tracks: 2

Construction
- Structure type: Ground
- Accessible: Yes

Other information
- Status: Staffed part-time
- Station code: 600483 (platform 1); 600484 (platform 2)
- Fare zone: Zone 4
- Website: Queensland Rail

History
- Opened: 1890
- Former names: Coonowrin; Glass Mountains; Glass House Mountains

Services
Preceding station	Queensland Rail	Following station
Beerburrum towards Ipswich or Rosewood via Roma Street	T1 Nambour/Gympie North line	Beerwah towards Nambour or Gympie North
Location

Glasshouse Mountains is a railway station operated by Queensland Rail on the Nambour/Gympie North line. It opened in 1890 and serves the Sunshine Coast town of Glass House Mountains. It is a ground level station, featuring two side platforms.

== History ==
The station opened in 1890 as Coonowrin (after nearby Mount Coonowrin) and was renamed Glass Mountains in February 1891 and Glass House Mountains in 1914. The official station name was later changed to Glasshouse Mountains, which differs from the Glass House Mountains after which it was named. Platform 1 has a steel shelter, while platform 2 has a wooden structure.

== Services ==
Glasshouse Mountains is serviced by Citytrain network services to Brisbane, Nambour and Gympie North. To relieve congestion on the single track North Coast line, the rail service is supplemented by a bus service operated by Kangaroo Bus Lines on weekdays between Caboolture and Nambour as route 649.

== Services by platform ==
Glasshouse Mountains platform arrangement
Platform	Lines	Destinations	Notes
1	T1 Nambour/Gympie North	Nambour or Gympie North	
1	T1 Nambour/Gympie North	Roma Street (to Ipswich/Rosewood line)	
2	T1 Nambour/Gympie North	Nambour or Gympie North	
2	T1 Nambour/Gympie North	Roma Street (to Ipswich/Rosewood line)	

== Future ==
The North Coast line from Beerburrum to Landsborough is scheduled to be duplicated by 2021.
