= Mooloolah railway station =

Railway station in Queensland, Australia

Mooloolah
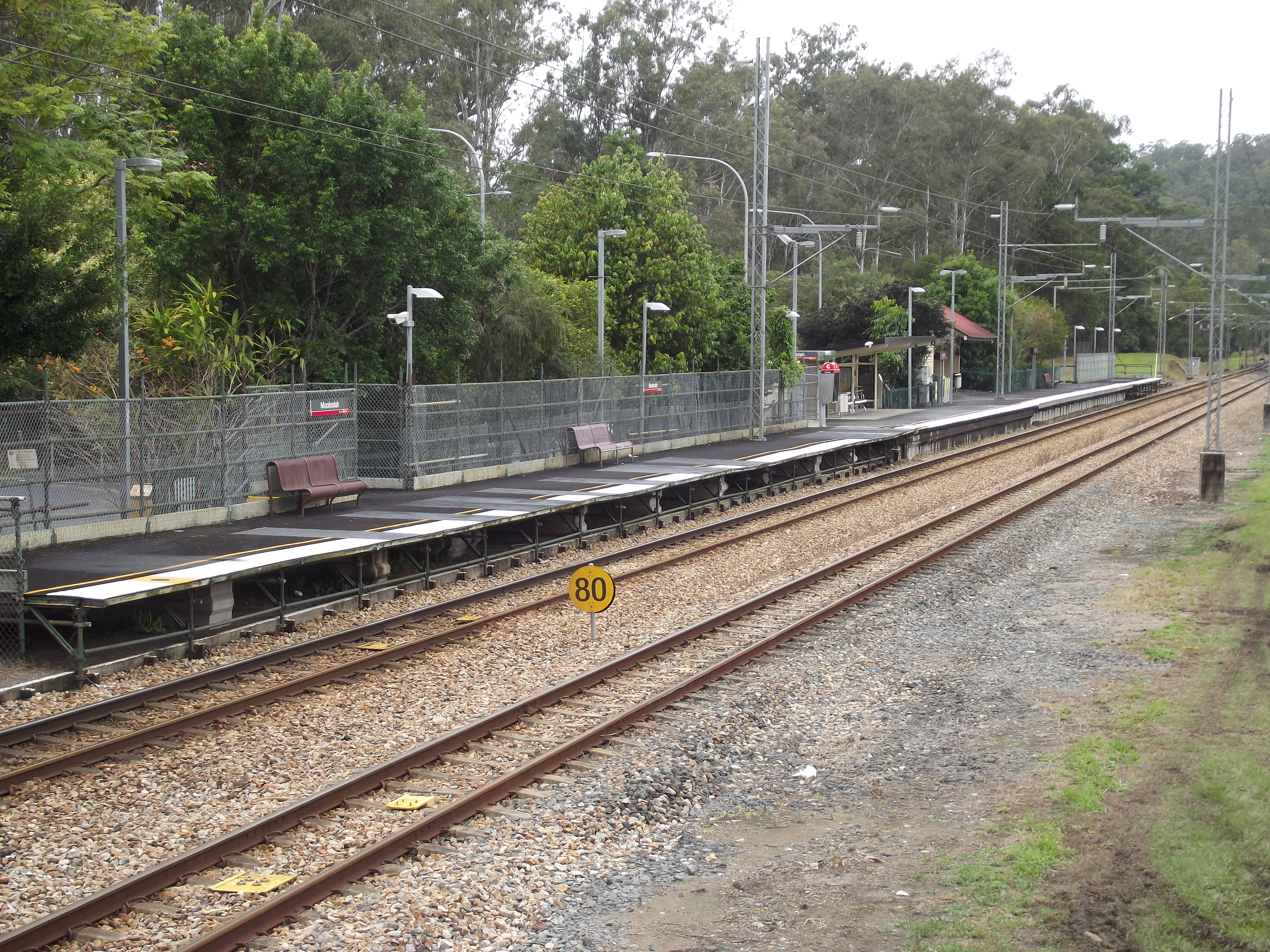
- Southbound view of the station platform, June 2012

General information
- Location: Jones Street, Mooloolah Valley
- Coordinates: 26°45′54″S 152°57′44″E
- Owner: Queensland Rail
- Operator: Queensland Rail
- Line: T1 Nambour/Gympie North
- Distance: 86.52 kilometres from Central
- Platforms: 1
- Tracks: 2

Construction
- Structure type: Ground

Other information
- Status: Unstaffed
- Station code: 600489
- Fare zone: Zone 5
- Website: Queensland Rail

History
- Opened: 1891; 135 years ago

Services
Preceding station	Queensland Rail	Following station
Landsborough towards Ipswich or Rosewood via Roma Street	T1 Nambour/Gympie North line	Eudlo towards Nambour or Gympie North
Location

Mooloolah is a railway station operated by Queensland Rail on the Nambour/Gympie North line. It opened in 1891 and serves the Sunshine Coast town of Mooloolah Valley. It is a ground level station, featuring one side platform.

== History ==
In 2009, the platform was extended at both its northern and southern ends with scaffolding and plywood materials. Initially intended as an interim arrangement until a permanent extension was built, the temporary platform remains. Opposite the platform lies a passing loop.

== Services ==
Mooloolah is serviced by Citytrain network services to Brisbane, Nambour and Gympie North. To relieve congestion on the single track North Coast line, the rail service is supplemented by a bus service operated by Kangaroo Bus Lines on weekdays between Caboolture and Nambour as route 649.

== Services by platform ==
Mooloolah platform arrangement
Platform	Line	Destinations	Notes
1	T1 Nambour/Gympie North	Nambour or Gympie North	
1	T1 Nambour/Gympie North	Roma Street (to Ipswich/Rosewood line)	
