= Elimbah railway station =

Railway station in Queensland, Australia

Elimbah
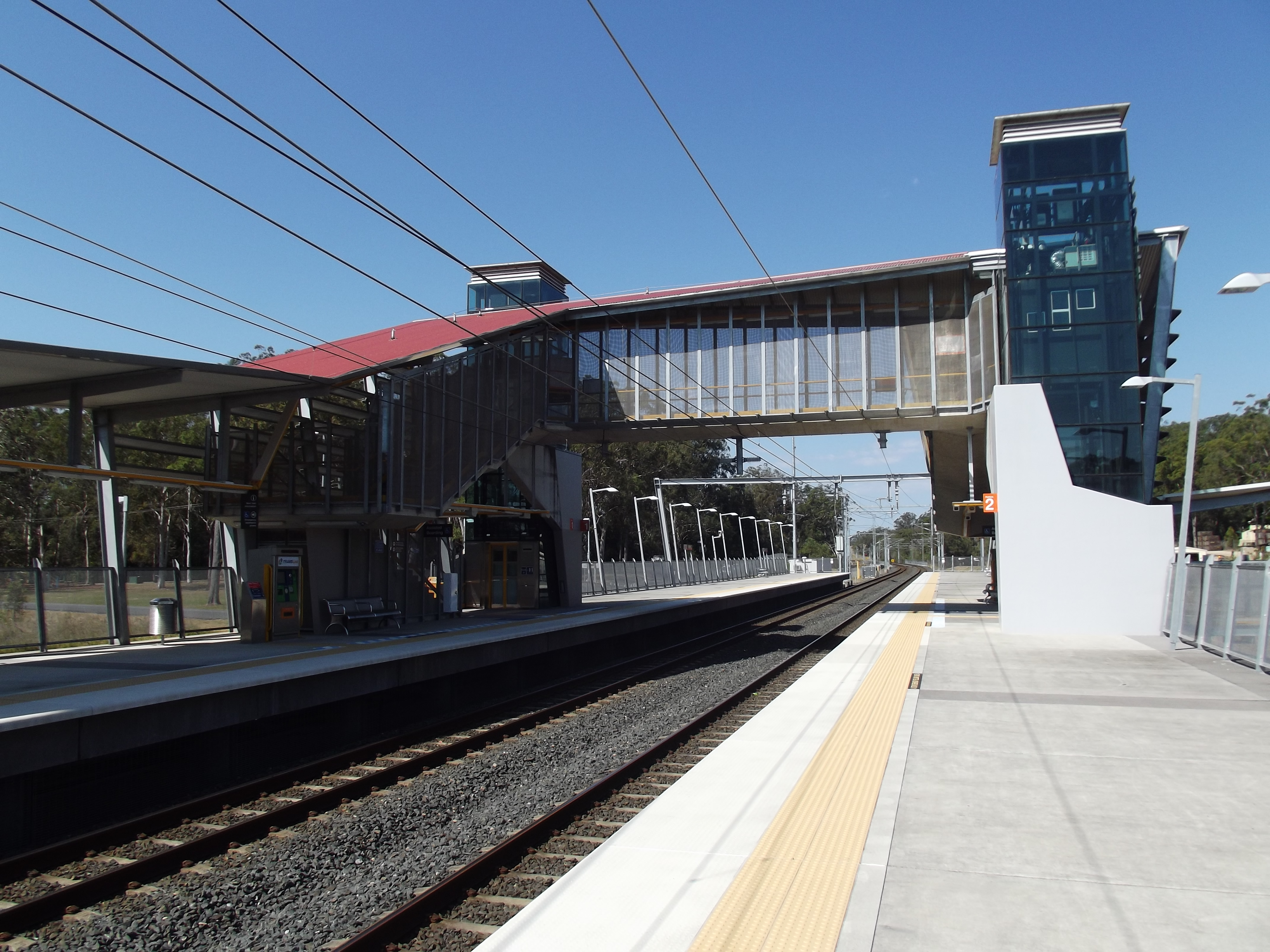
- Northbound view from Platform 2 in September 2012

General information
- Location: English Street, Elimbah
- Coordinates: 27°00′40″S 152°56′45″E
- Owner: Queensland Rail
- Operator: Queensland Rail
- Line: T1 Nambour/Gympie North
- Distance: 57.63 kilometres from Central
- Platforms: 2 side
- Tracks: 2

Construction
- Structure type: Ground
- Parking: 30 spaces
- Accessible: Yes

Other information
- Status: Staffed (reduced service)
- Station code: 600479 (platform 1); 600480 (platform 2)
- Fare zone: Zone 4
- Website: Queensland Rail

History
- Opened: 1890; 136 years ago
- Rebuilt: 14 April 2009; 17 years ago

Services
Preceding station	Queensland Rail	Following station
Caboolture towards Ipswich or Rosewood via Roma Street	T1 Nambour/Gympie North line	Beerburrum towards Nambour or Gympie North
Location

Elimbah is a railway station operated by Queensland Rail on the Nambour/Gympie North line. It opened in 1890 as 36 miles 68 chains and serves the Moreton Bay suburb of Elimbah. It is a ground level station, featuring two side platforms.

== History ==
Elimbah station was originally a single platform with a crossing loop. As part of the construction of a new 14 kilometre alignment for the North Coast line from Caboolture to Beerburrum, a new station was built immediately to the east, opening on 14 April 2009.

== Services ==
Elimbah is serviced by Citytrain network services to Brisbane, Nambour and Gympie North. To relieve congestion on the single track North Coast line north of Beerburrum, the rail service is supplemented by a bus service operated by Kangaroo Bus Lines on weekdays between Caboolture and Nambour as route 649.

== Services by platform ==
Elimbah platform arrangement
Platform	Lines	Destinations	Notes
1	T1 Nambour/Gympie North	Roma Street (to Ipswich/Rosewood line)	
2	T1 Nambour/Gympie North	Nambour or Gympie North	

== Future ==
In 2016 construction commenced on stabling facilities a few kilometres south of the station as part of the New Generation Rollingstock project.
