= Woombye railway station =

Australian train station

Woombye
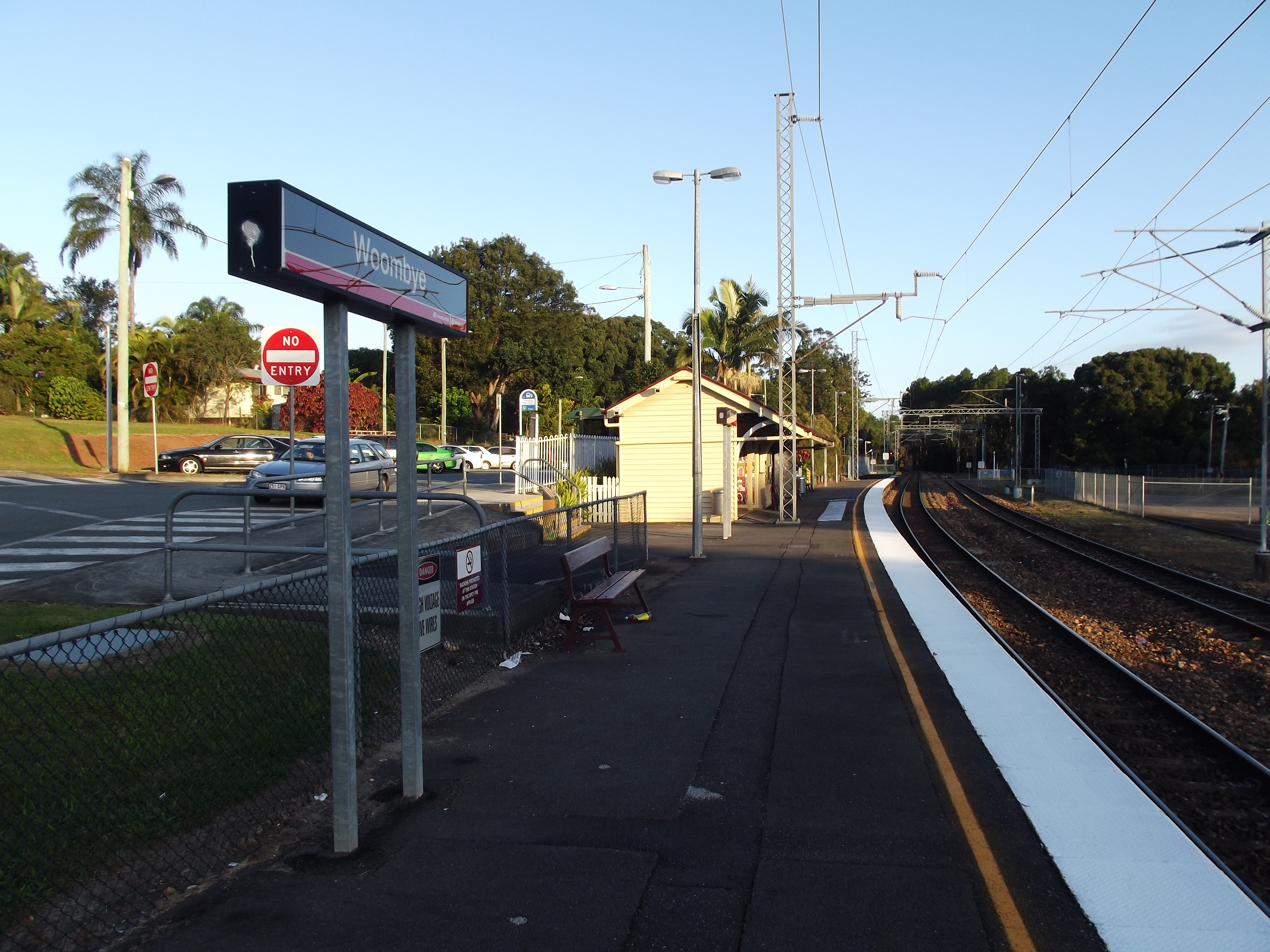
- Southbound view from the station platform in July 2012

General information
- Location: Blackall Street, Woombye
- Coordinates: 26°39′38″S 152°57′45″E
- Owner: Queensland Rail
- Operator: Queensland Rail
- Line: T1 Nambour/Gympie North
- Distance: 99.68 kilometres from Central
- Platforms: 1
- Tracks: 2

Construction
- Structure type: Ground
- Accessible: Yes

Other information
- Status: Unstaffed
- Station code: 600492
- Fare zone: Zone 6
- Website: Queensland Rail

History
- Opened: 1891; 135 years ago

Services
Preceding station	Queensland Rail	Following station
Palmwoods towards Ipswich or Rosewood via Roma Street	T1 Nambour/Gympie North line	Nambour Terminus
Palmwoods towards Ipswich or Rosewood via Roma Street	T1 Nambour/Gympie North line	Nambour towards Gympie North
Location

Woombye is a railway station operated by Queensland Rail on the Nambour/Gympie North line. It opened in 1891 and serves the Sunshine Coast town of Woombye. It is a ground level station, featuring one side platform.

== History ==
The station today consists of one platform with a wooden structure. In 2009, the platform was extended at both its northern and southern ends with scaffolding and plywood materials. Initially intended as an interim arrangement until a permanent extension was built, the temporary platform remains. Opposite the platform lies a passing loop and a disused goods yard.

== Services ==
Woombye is serviced by Citytrain network services to Brisbane, Nambour and Gympie North. To relieve congestion on the single track North Coast line, the rail service is supplemented by a bus service operated by Kangaroo Bus Lines on weekdays between Caboolture and Nambour as route 649.

== Services by platform ==
Woombye platform arrangement
Platform	Line	Destinations	Notes
1	T1 Nambour/Gympie North	Nambour or Gympie North	
1	T1 Nambour/Gympie North	Roma Street (to Ipswich/Rosewood line)	

== Stabling yard ==
In 2016 construction commenced on stabling facilities south of the station as part of the New Generation Rollingstock project.
