= East Ipswich railway station =

Railway station in Queensland, Australia

East Ipswich
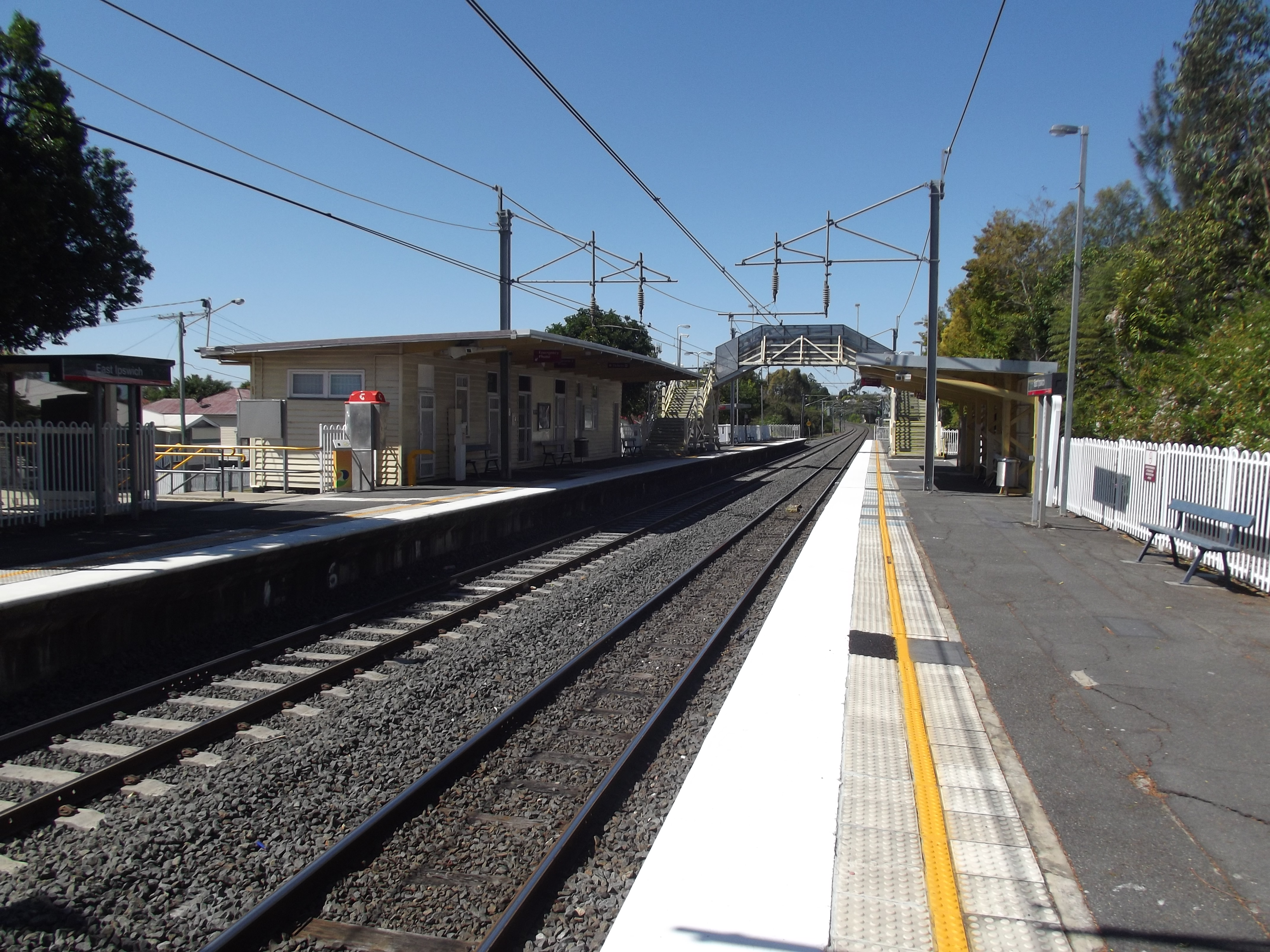
- Westbound view from Platform 1 in September 2012

General information
- Location: Merton Street, East Ipswich
- Coordinates: 27.6100°S 152.7750°E
- Owner: Queensland Rail
- Operator: Queensland Rail
- Line: T1 Ipswich/Rosewood
- Distance: 37.02 kilometres from Central
- Platforms: 2 side
- Tracks: 2

Construction
- Structure type: Ground
- Parking: 258 bays

Other information
- Station code: 600345 (platform 1); 600346 (platform 2)
- Fare zone: Zone 3
- Website: Queensland Rail

History
- Opened: 1879; 147 years ago
- Former names: Limestone

Services
Preceding station	Queensland Rail	Following station
Booval towards Caboolture via Roma Street	T1 Ipswich/Rosewood line	Ipswich Terminus
Booval towards Caboolture via Roma Street	T1 Ipswich/Rosewood line	Ipswich towards Rosewood
Location

East Ipswich is a railway station operated by Queensland Rail on the Ipswich/Rosewood line. It opened in 1879 and serves the Ipswich suburb of East Ipswich. It is a ground level station, featuring two side platforms.

== History ==
It opened in 1879 as Limestone, being renamed East Ipswich in 1892.

== Platforms and services ==
East Ipswich is served by trains operating to and from Ipswich and Rosewood. Most city-bound services run to Caboolture and Nambour, with some morning peak trains terminating at Bowen Hills. Some afternoon inbound services on weekdays run to Kippa-Ring. East Ipswich is two minutes from Ipswich and 56 minutes on an all-stops train from Central.

East Ipswich platform arrangement
Platform	Line	Destination	Notes
1	T1 Ipswich/Rosewood	Ipswich or Rosewood	
2	T1 Ipswich/Rosewood	Roma Street (to Caboolture and Nambour/Gympie North lines)	
