= Eumundi railway station =

Railway station in Queensland, Australia

Eumundi
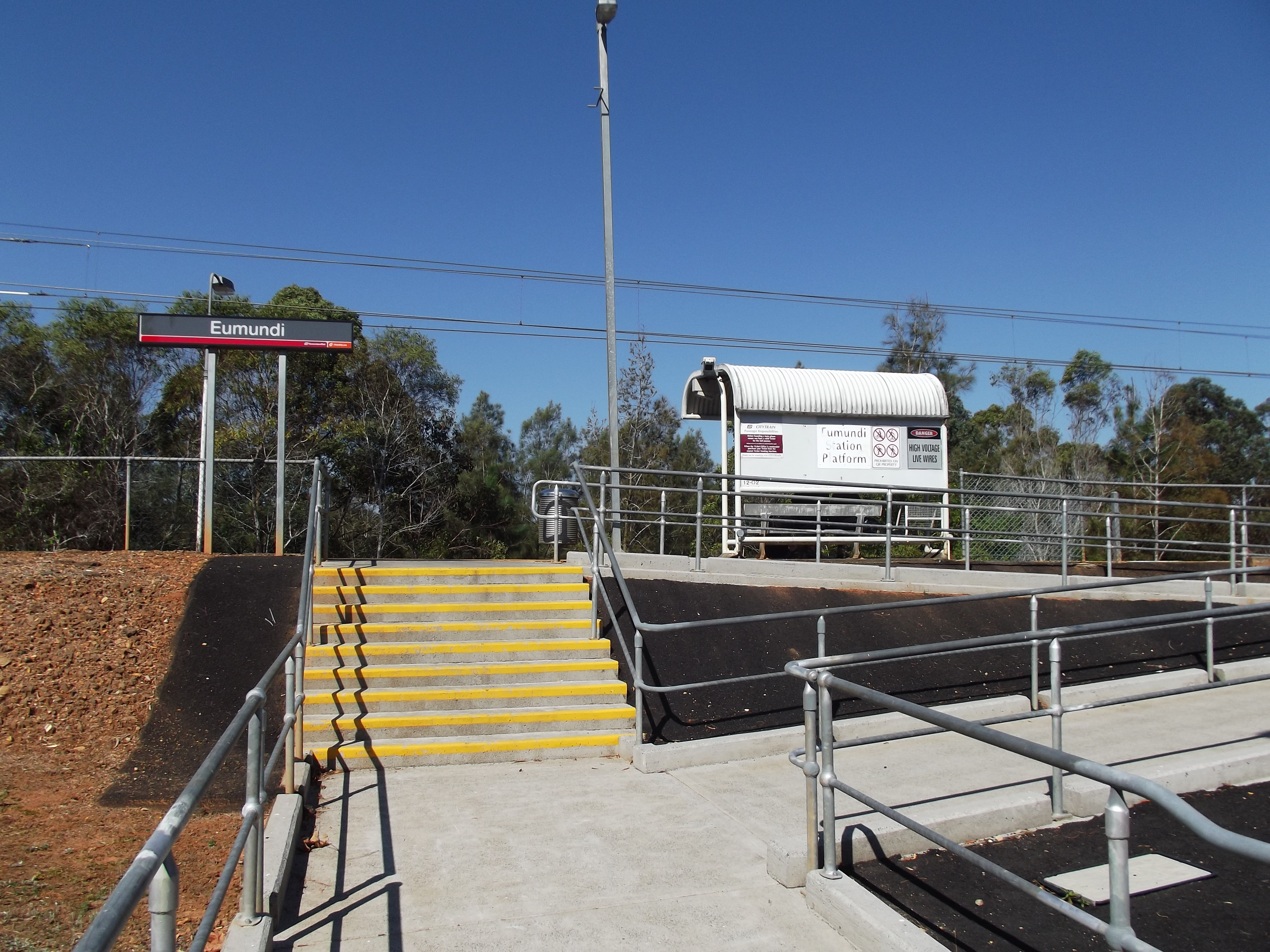
- View leading up to the platform in September 2012

General information
- Location: Memorial Drive, Eumundi
- Coordinates: 26°28′49″S 152°57′18″E
- Owner: Queensland Rail
- Operator: Queensland Rail
- Line: T1 Nambour/Gympie North
- Distance: 122.50 kilometres from Central
- Platforms: 1
- Tracks: 1

Construction
- Structure type: Ground
- Parking: 19
- Accessible: Yes

Other information
- Status: Unstaffed
- Station code: 600495
- Fare zone: Zone 7
- Website: Queensland Rail

History
- Opened: 1988; 38 years ago

Services
Preceding station	Queensland Rail	Following station
Yandina towards Roma Street	Gympie North service	Cooroy towards Gympie North
Location
- Location within Australia

Eumundi is a railway station operated by Queensland Rail on the Nambour/Gympie North line. It opened in 1988 and serves the Sunshine Coast town of Eumundi. It is a ground level station, featuring one side platform.

== History ==
The original Eumundi railway station opened in 1891 on Gympie Road (now Memorial Drive) opposite Gridley Street (26.4770°S 152.9529°E) as part of the opening of the North Coast line; it is now the site of the Eumundi Markets. The current railway station opened in 1988 when a 10-kilometre (6.2 mi) deviation was built as part of the electrification of the North Coast line.

The station today consists of one platform with a steel shelter. In 2009, the platform was extended with scaffolding and plywood materials. Initially intended as an interim arrangement until a permanent extension was built, the temporary platform remained until December 2019. A permanent reconstruction of the platform commenced in May 2019 and was completed by December 2019.

== Services ==
Eumundi is serviced by two daily Citytrain network services in each direction.

== Platforms and services ==
Eumundi platform arrangement
Platform	Line	Destination	Notes
1	T1 Nambour/Gympie North	Gympie North	
1	T1 Nambour/Gympie North	Roma Street (to Ipswich/Rosewood line)	

== Transport links ==
Kinetic Sunshine Coast bus routes 630 and 631 Noosa Junction to Nambour station serve Eumundi station.
