= Landsborough railway station =

Railway station in Queensland, Australia

Landsborough
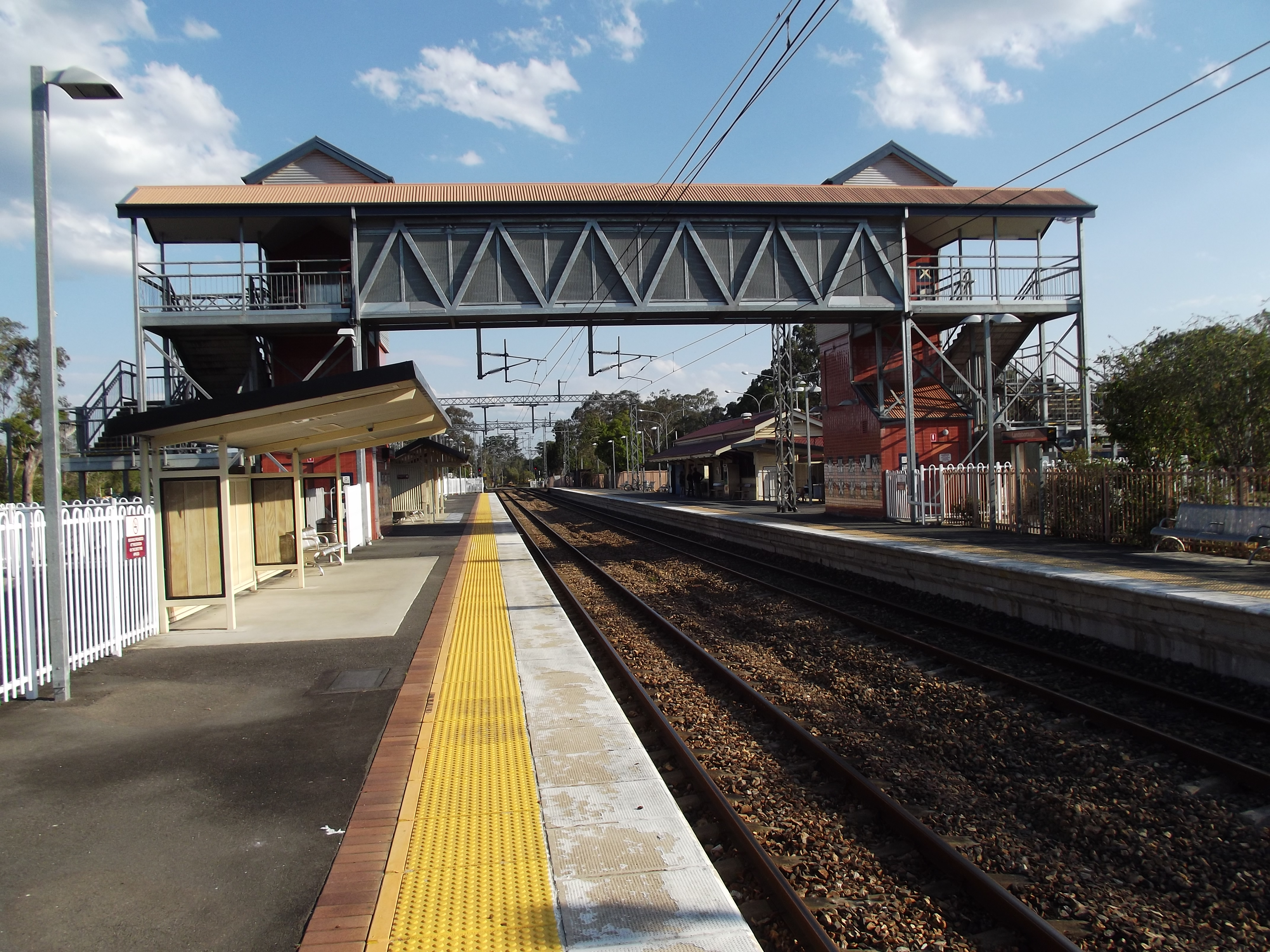
- Southbound view from Platform 1 in September 2012

General information
- Location: Cribb Street, Landsborough
- Coordinates: 26°48′29″S 152°57′57″E
- Owner: Queensland Rail
- Operator: Queensland Rail
- Lines: T1 Nambour/Gympie North; Spirit of Queensland; Tilt Train
- Distance: 81.47 kilometres from Central
- Platforms: 2 side
- Tracks: 2

Construction
- Structure type: Ground
- Platform levels: 1
- Parking: 207 spaces
- Cycle facilities: No
- Accessible: Yes

Other information
- Status: Staffed
- Station code: 600487 (platform 1); 600488 (platform 2)
- Fare zone: Zone 5
- Website: Queensland Rail

History
- Opened: 1890; 136 years ago
- Rebuilt: 2007; 19 years ago

Services
Preceding station	Queensland Rail	Following station
Beerwah towards Ipswich or Rosewood via Roma Street	T1 Nambour/Gympie North line	Mooloolah towards Nambour or Gympie North
Long distance services
Caboolture towards Brisbane	Spirit of Queensland	Nambour towards Cairns
Caboolture towards Brisbane	Tilt Train	Nambour towards Rockhampton
Location

Landsborough is a railway station operated by Queensland Rail on the Nambour/Gympie North line. It opened in 1890 and serves the Sunshine Coast town of Landsborough. It is a ground level station, featuring two side platforms.

Long-distance services on the North Coast line, including the Spirit of Queensland and Tilt Train, stop at Landsborough.

== History ==
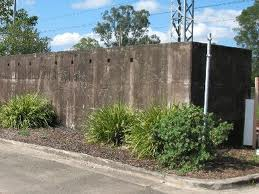
Landsborough Bomb Shelter

In 1998, construction began on Platform 2.

In December 2006, the State Government announced the station would be upgraded. The work was completed in late 2007, and included the building of new platforms, rainwater tanks, shelters, lighting, and toilets. A new cark park was also built. These upgrades were part of an overhaul of the Caboolture to Landsborough section of the North Coast line. The section was to be duplicated in full by 2012, but so far only the Caboolture to Beerburrum section has been completed. The next stage is currently scheduled to be completed by 2027, between Beerburrum and Beerwah as part of the Beerburrum to Nambour Rail Upgrade (Stage 1). A new park 'n' ride and bus interchange facility opened on the eastern side of the station in 2023.

Previously on the eastern side of the station, a locomotive turning triangle existed. This was removed during the construction of the new park 'n' ride facility.

The station has the Landsborough Air Raid Shelter, one of the few remaining examples of World War II reinforced-concrete air raid shelters in Queensland. Landsborough was a regular stopping point for refreshments for troop trains. The air raid shelter is now heritage-listed.

== Services ==
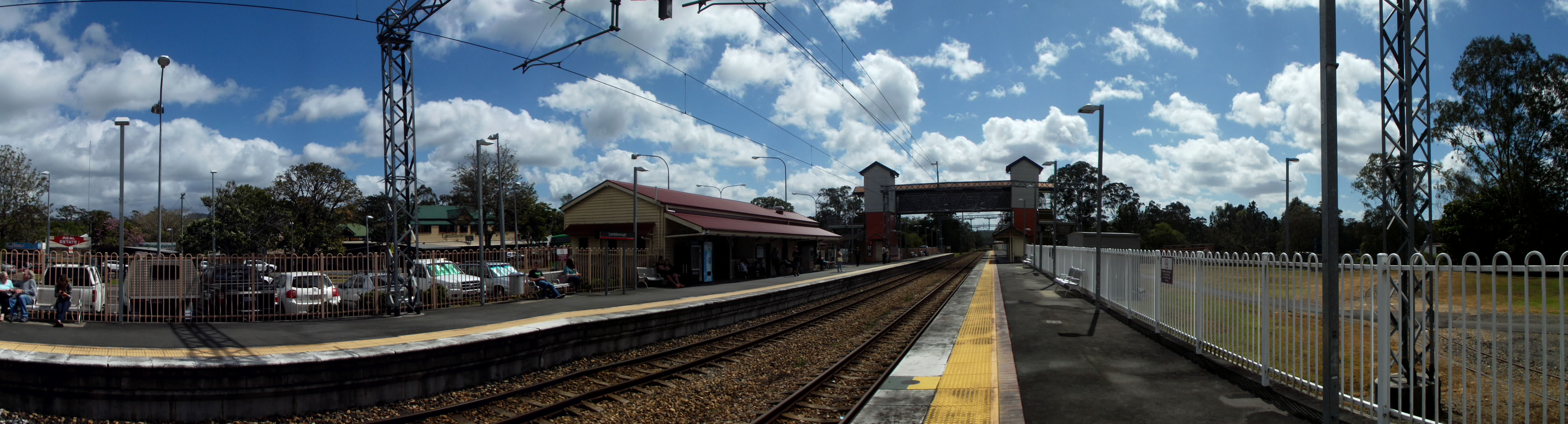
Landsborough railway station

Landsborough is serviced by Citytrain network services to Brisbane, Nambour and Gympie North. To relieve congestion on the single track North Coast line, the rail service is supplemented by a bus service operated by Kangaroo Bus Lines on weekdays between Caboolture and Nambour as route 649.

Landsborough is also served by long-distance Traveltrain Electric Tilt Train services to Rockhamption and Spirit of Queensland services to Cairns.

== Services by platform ==
Landsborough platform arrangement
Platform	Lines	Destinations	Notes
1	T1 Nambour/Gympie North	Nambour or Gympie North	
1	Spirit of Queensland	Cairns	
1	Spirit of Queensland	Roma Street	
1	Tilt Train	Rockhampton	
1	Tilt Train	Roma Street	
2	T1 Nambour/Gympie North	Roma Street (to Ipswich/Rosewood line)	

== Transport links ==
Kinetic Sunshine Coast operate two bus routes to and from Landsborough station:

- 605: to Caloundra
- 615: to Sunshine Plaza via Mooloolaba, University of the Sunshine Coast

Kangaroo Bus Lines operate one bus route via Landsborough station:

- 649: Caboolture to Nambour railbus

Glasshouse Country Coaches operates one bus route to and from Landsborough station:

- 891: Maleny (go card is not valid)
