= Maroochydore railway line =

Proposed railway line in Queensland, Australia

Maroochydore line
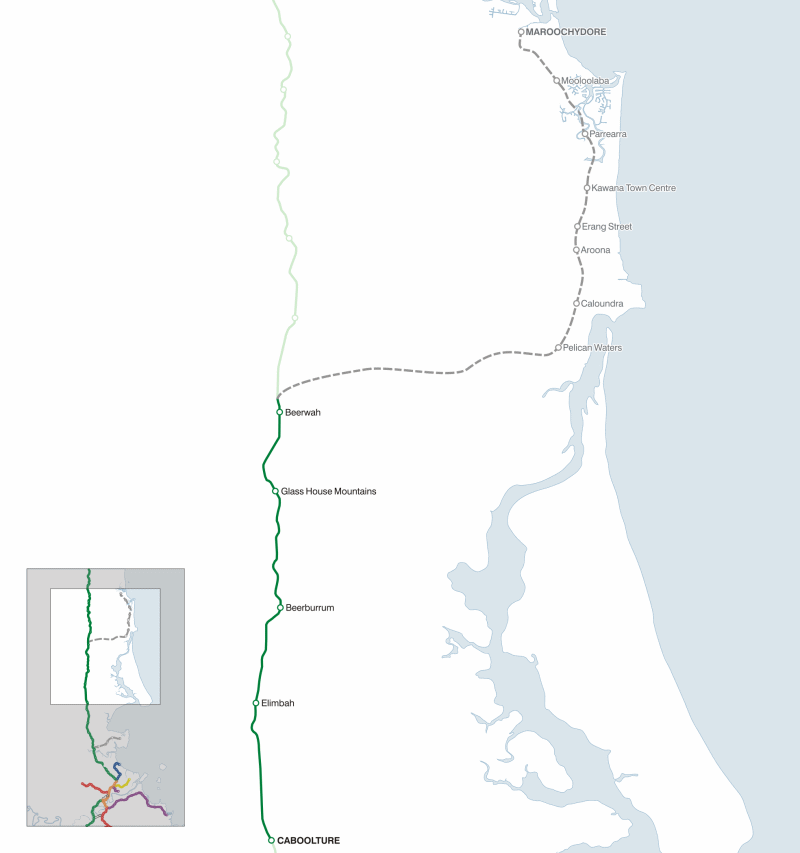

Overview
- Status: Construction
- Owner: Department of Transport and Main Roads
- Locale: Sunshine Coast
- Termini: Beerwah; Caloundra (Stage 1), Birtinya (Stage 2), Maroochydore (Stage 3)
- Stations: 7 (subject to further planning)
- Website: tmr.qld.gov.au

Service
- System: Queensland Rail Citytrain network
- Operator: Queensland Rail

Technical
- Line length: 37.8 km (23.5 mi)
- Track gauge: 1,067 mm (3 ft 6 in)
- Electrification: Yes
- Operating speed: 160 km/h (100 mph)

The Maroochydore line is a planned interurban commuter railway line in South East Queensland. Operated by Queensland Rail, the line will run from the Sunshine Coast to the Brisbane CBD.

It was first proposed as the Caboolture to Maroochydore Corridor Options Study before being revised and superseded by the Direct Sunshine Coast Rail Line, which was later rebranded as The Wave Stages 1 and 2 (Rail).

== History ==
A direct rail line serving the coastal areas of the Sunshine Coast has been identified as an integral transport project since the mid 1990s.

=== Caboolture to Maroochydore Corridor Options Study ===
The corridor between Caboolture and Maroochydore was initially studied and released in the Caboolture to Maroochydore Corridor Options Study (CAMCOS) in 1998, where a regional heavy rail line was recommended. The study also suggested the introduction of new bus services along the corridor prior to the completion of the rail line.

Public consultation was conducted in January 1999, with newsletters and displays of aerial photographs. On 31 March 1999, the Minister for Transport and Main Roads, Steve Bredhauer, announced that a route from the existing North Coast railway line at Beerwah station through to Maroochydore had been decided. In 2001, a corridor between Beerwah and Marcoola was preserved to then-standards for a single-track railway.

In July 2007, the Caloundra City Council and Queensland Government commissioned a subordinate study into the realignment of the proposed corridor in Caloundra South. It was proposed that the corridor should be altered to run west of Golden Beach and through the Caloundra Airport site.

In preparation of the CAMCOS project, a 14-kilometre (9 mi) alignment on the North Coast line from Caboolture to Beerburrum was duplicated in 2009. A further alignment between Beerburrum and Beerwah was duplicated in 2011.

The project was listed as a major regional project in the Queensland Government's Connecting SEQ 2031 transport policy, which was released in October 2011.

=== Direct Sunshine Coast Rail Line ===
In 2020, a private consortium known as "North Coast Connect" undertook a business case on faster rail services between Brisbane and the Sunshine Coast.

In the March 2022 federal budget, the Morrison Liberal–National government announced a commitment of A$1.6 billion towards the construction of the line to improve transport facilities for the 2032 Brisbane Olympics, under the condition that the project's budget would be split 50–50 with the Queensland Government.

The Direct Sunshine Coast Rail Line (DSC) business case was released in late 2023. The business case proposed updating the CAMCOS alignment to current Queensland Rail standards, increasing line speeds up to 160 kilometres per hour (99 mph) and duplicating the line.

The proposal removed three stations – Parrearra, Creekside and Pelican Waters – that were part of the 1998 CAMCOS proposal, citing their location in flood-prone areas, accessibility challenges and to allow for faster journey times and higher speeds.

It was recommended the project be built in stages. Stage 1 would include construction of the rail line from Beerwah Junction and Caloundra, including a new Nirimba (Aura) station, Caloundra station, the Beerwah South Yard and the upgrade of the existing Beerwah station. Stage 2 included the line from Caloundra to Birtinya Yard, including construction of Birtinya station, Aroona station and the Birtinya Yard facility. Stage 3 would run from Birtinya station to Maroochydore, including construction of Mountain Creek station, although the line would only be operational to Birtinya by 2032.

In November 2023, following the election of the Albanese Labor government, federal transport minister Catherine King announced a reduction in funding for the project citing increased costs and a lack of demand. In February 2024, the Queensland government announced funding of $3 billion for the first stage of the project, from Beerwah to Caloundra. If the federal government provided matching funding, construction could start in 2026 for completion by 2032. In May 2024, the federal government announced its contribution of $2.75 billion for the first stage of the line to Caloundra.

=== The Wave ===
In March 2025, the Crisafulli state government announced that the line would terminate at Birtinya, marketing the project as The Wave. Stage 1 and Stage 2 would built according to the DSC proposal, stylised as "The Wave Stages 1 and 2 (Rail)". Stage 3 would be superseded by a new bus rapid transit (BRT) system similar to the Brisbane Metro, stylised as "The Wave Stage 3 (Metro)". The BRT would be built on the preserved corridor to Sunshine Coast Airport via Maroochydore, which would include a bus station at Mountain Creek and a connection to the existing Sunshine Coast University Hospital bus station.

The Wave is set to be operational by 2031.

== Stations ==
The CAMCOS (1998) proposal included eight new stations and one existing station.

The DSC (2023) proposal included six new stations and one existing station.

The Wave (2025) proposal includes three new rail stations, three new Bus Rapid Transit stations, and a combined rail station and Bus Rapid Transit station at Birtinya.

CAMCOS (1998)	DSC (2023)	The Wave (2025)
		Sunshine Coast Airport (BRT)
Maroochydore		Maroochydore (BRT)
Mooloolaba	Mountain Creek	Mountain Creek (BRT)
Parrearra	Mountain Creek	Mountain Creek (BRT)
Kawana Town Centre	Birtinya	Birtinya (rail and BRT)
Erang Street	Birtinya	Birtinya (rail and BRT)
Aroona
Caloundra
Pelican Waters	Nirimba	Bells Creek (Aura)
Beerwah (upgraded)
