= Beerburrum railway station =

Railway station in Queensland, Australia

Beerburrum
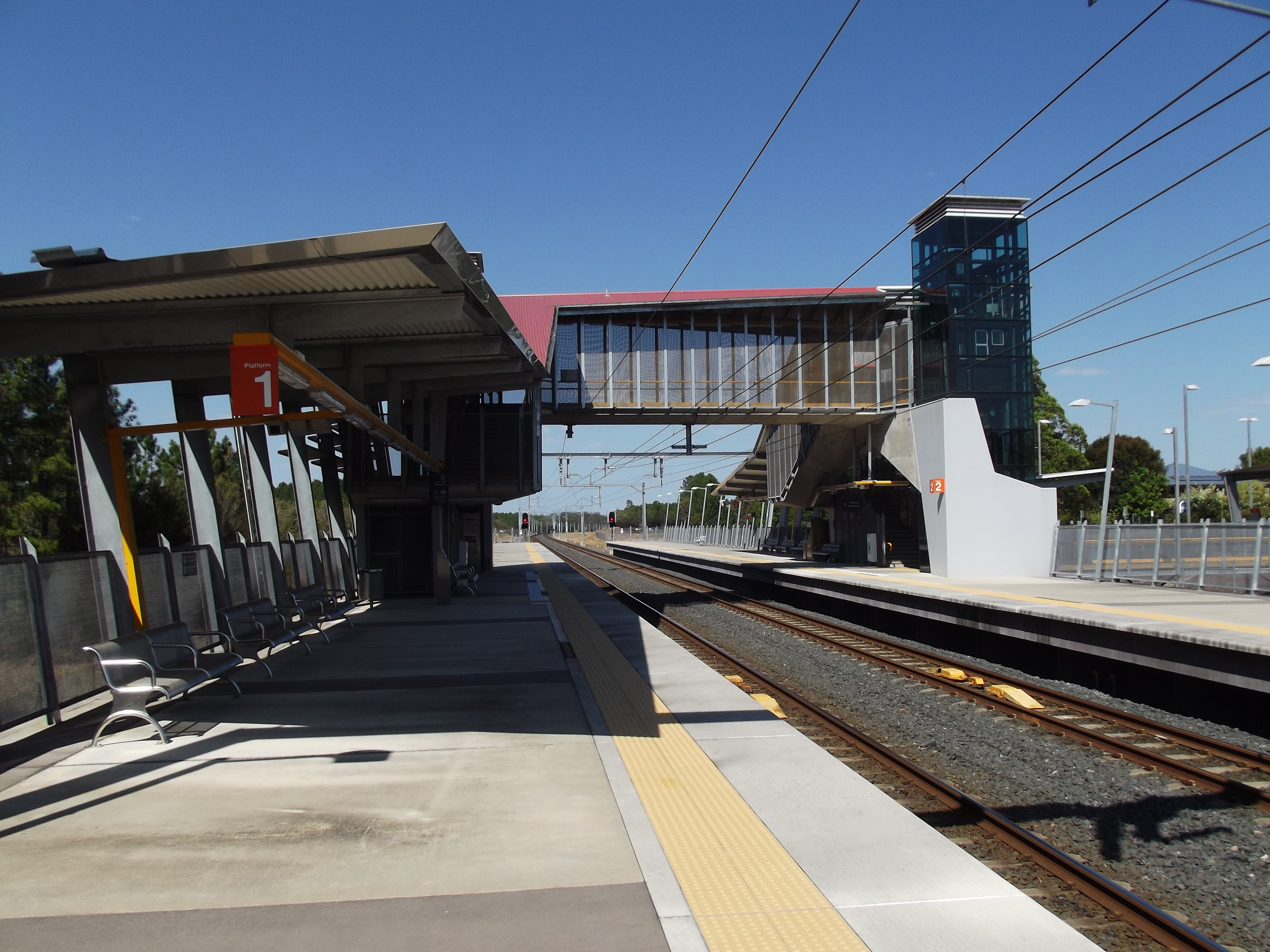
- Northbound view from Platform 2 in September 2012

General information
- Location: Church Street, Beerburrum
- Coordinates: 26°57′37″S 152°57′30″E
- Owner: Queensland Rail
- Operator: Queensland Rail
- Line: T1 Nambour/Gympie North
- Distance: 64.76 kilometres from Central
- Platforms: 2 side
- Tracks: 2

Construction
- Structure type: Ground
- Parking: 30 spaces
- Accessible: Yes

Other information
- Status: Unstaffed
- Station code: 600481 (platform 1); 600482 (platform 2)
- Fare zone: Zone 4
- Website: Queensland Rail

History
- Opened: 1890; 136 years ago
- Rebuilt: 14 April 2009; 17 years ago

Services
Preceding station	Queensland Rail	Following station
Elimbah towards Ipswich or Rosewood	Nambour/Gympie North line	Glasshouse Mountains towards Nambour or Gympie North
Location

Beerburrum is a railway station operated by Queensland Rail on the Nambour/Gympie North line. It opened in 1890 and serves the Sunshine Coast suburb of Beerburrum. It is a ground level station, featuring two side platforms.

== History ==
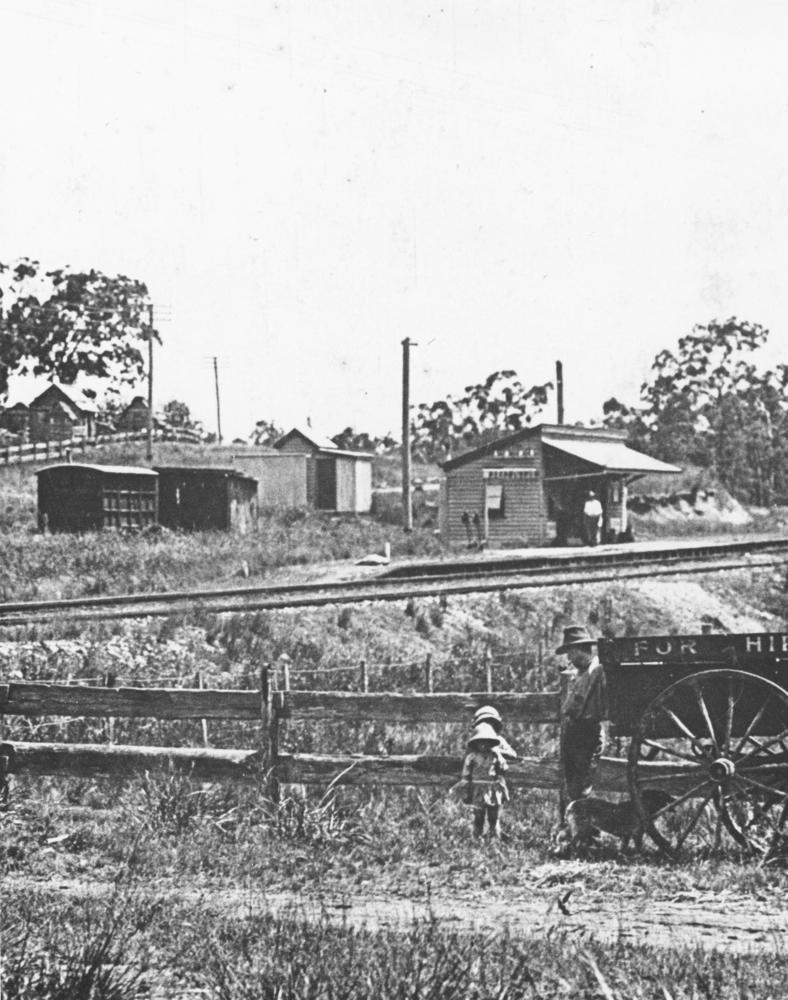
Looking towards the railway station, Beerburrum, 1916

The North Coast line from Caboolture to Landsborough (which included a siding at Beerburrum) was completed on 1 February 1890.

Beerburrum station was originally a single platform with a crossing loop. As part of the construction of a new 14 kilometre alignment for the North Coast line from Caboolture to Beerburrum, a new station was built immediately to the east, opening on 14 April 2009. Beyond Beerburrum, the line becomes single track..

== Services ==
Beerburrum is serviced by Citytrain network services to Brisbane, Nambour and Gympie North. To relieve congestion on the single track North Coast line north of Beerburrum, the rail service is supplemented by a bus service operated by Kangaroo Bus Lines on weekdays between Caboolture and Nambour as route 649.

== Services by platform ==
Beerburrum platform arrangement
Platform	Lines	Destinations	Notes
1	T1 Nambour/Gympie North	Roma Street (to Ipswich/Rosewood line)	
2	T1 Nambour/Gympie North	Nambour or Gympie North	
