= Glass House Mountains (disambiguation) =

The Glass House Mountains are a mountain range in Queensland, Australia. Glass House Mountains can also refer to:

- Glass House Mountains National Park, containing the mountains
- Glass House Mountains, Queensland, a town near the mountains
- Glasshouse Mountains railway station, which serves the town and the national park
