= Nambour/Gympie North line =

Passenger rail service in Queensland, Australia

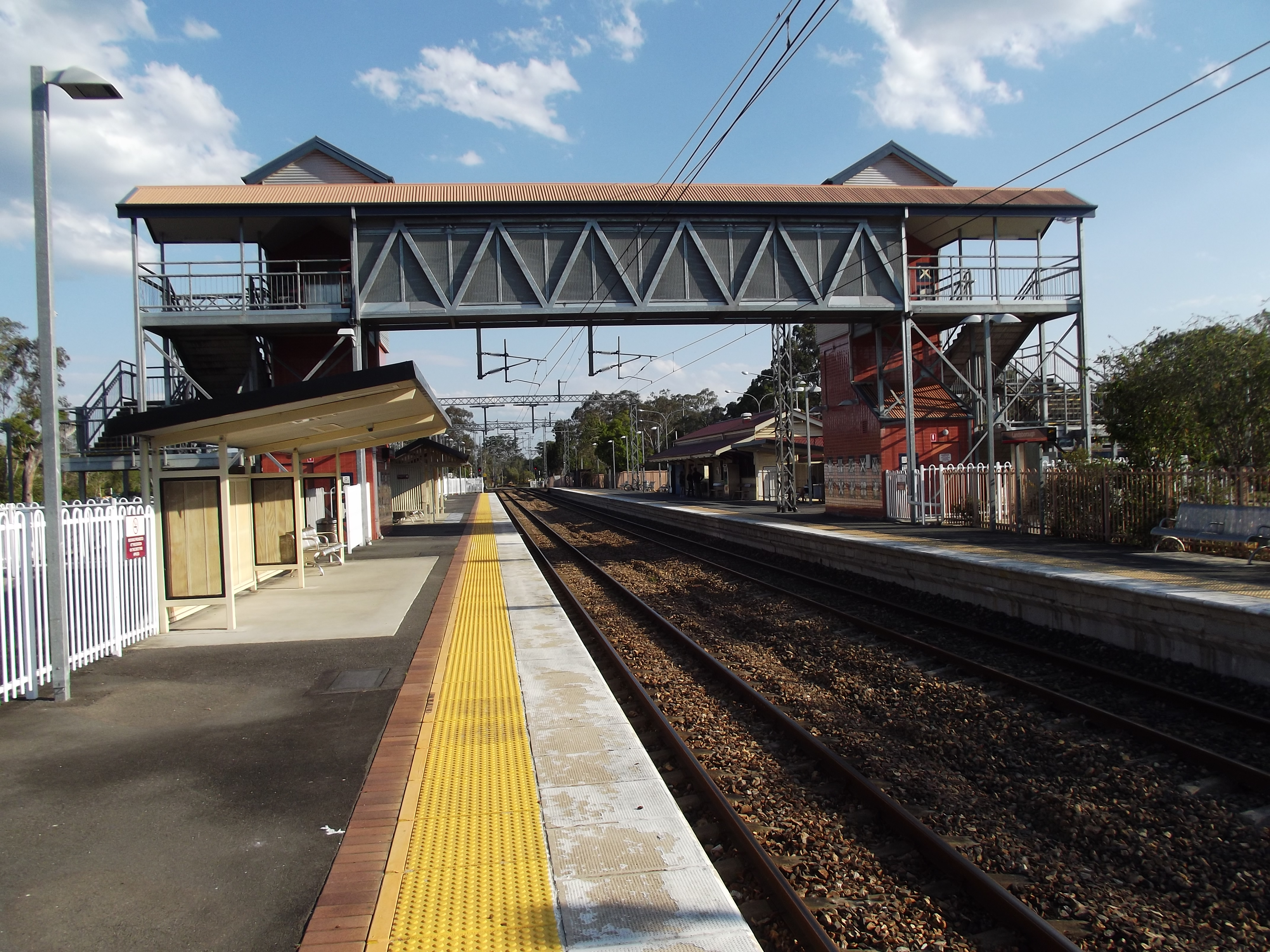
- Landsborough station in September 2012

Overview
- Status: Operational
- Owner: Queensland Rail
- Locale: Sunshine Coast
- Termini: Roma Street; Gympie North
- Stations: 29

Service
- Type: Interurban commuter rail
- System: Queensland Rail Citytrain network
- Operator: Queensland Rail
- Rolling stock: IMU (Gympie North & Nambour); SMU260/NGR (Nambour)

Technical
- Line length: 180 km (110 mi)
- Track length: 172.21 km (107.01 mi)
- Number of tracks: Quadruple to Northgate, triple to Petrie, double to Beerburrum, single with passing loops to Gympie North
- Track gauge: 1,067 mm (3 ft 6 in)
- Electrification: 1988
- Operating speed: 140 km/h (87 mph)

The T1 Nambour/Gympie North line is an interurban commuter railway line in South East Queensland. Operated by Queensland Rail, the line runs for 173 kilometres (107 miles) from Gympie North to Roma Street, where services continue on the Ipswich/Rosewood line.

== History ==
The North Coast railway line reached the Sunshine Coast area in 1890. In 1988, the section of the line was electrified for electric multiple units. Today, the line uses interurban passenger trains operated by Citytrain.

On 10 August 2026, the Sunshine Coast line was numbered T1 (along with the Caboolture and Ipswich/Rosewood lines) and renamed the Nambour/Gympie North line.

=== Upgrades ===
In 2001, the Queensland Government started a study for the need to upgrade the North Coast Line between Caboolture and Landsborough.

On 14 April 2009, a new 14-kilometre (8.7 mi) double-track alignment from Caboolture to Beerburrum opened. A four kilometre section of the old line immediately north of Caboolture was retained for use as a passing loop, with the remainder of the old line lifted. This saw new stations at Elimbah and Beerburrum built. Glasshouse Mountains, Beerwah and Landsborough stations have all received major work including platform extensions and lifts.

In 2009, the platforms at Mooloolah, Palmwoods, Woombye, Eudlo, Eumundi, Pomona and Cooran were extended with scaffolding and plywood materials. Initially intended as an interim arrangement until permanent extensions were built, the temporary platforms remain.

A study has been completed into duplicating and straightening the line between Landsbrough and Nambour. It is proposed that two new tunnels and four upgraded stations (Mooloolah, Eudlo, Palmwoods and Woombye) will be constructed. In September 2024, a John Holland / Seymour Whyte consortium was awarded a contract to deliver stage 1 of the project. This will include duplication of the line between Beerburrum and Beerwah and straightening the line between Beerburrum and Glass House Mountains. Construction is to commence in 2025. There is also a proposed line from Beerwah To Caloundra and the Queensland government has set aside A$1.44 billion in funding for construction.

== Network and operations ==
Nambour and Gympie North services use the Caboolture line to Caboolture, then the North Coast line to Nambour and Gympie North. The line consists of four tracks from Roma Street to Northgate, then three tracks to Petrie, allowing Nambour & Gympie North express services to pass the local Caboolture services. The line is then double track to Beerburrum.

North of Beerburrum, the line is single track with passing loops at most stations. Due to the rapidly rising population on the Sunshine Coast and in hinterland towns, the annual compounded growth rate for morning peak passenger numbers on the line north of Caboolture is 6%, second only to the 7.1% figure for the Gold Coast line south of Beenleigh.

Traveltrain services; the Spirit of Queensland, Spirit of the Outback and the Bundaberg and Rockhamption Tilt Trains traverse the line, along with Aurizon and Pacific National freight trains.

=== Services ===
Trains to and from Nambour typically run express between Petrie and Bowen Hills, with stops at Northgate and Eagle Junction. Trains to and from Gympie North skips stations between Caboolture and Bowen Hills stopping only at Petrie and Northgate.

To relieve congestion on the section north of Beerburrum, the rail service is supplemented by a bus service operated by Kangaroo Bus Lines on weekdays between Caboolture and Nambour as route 649. Passengers for/from the Redcliffe Peninsula line change at Petrie, Shorncliffe line at Northgate, Airport and Doomben lines change at Eagle Junction and Ferny Grove lines change at Bowen Hills, and all other lines at Central.

=== Stations ===
List of T1 Nambour/Gympie North line stations
T1 Nambour/Gympie North line
Station	Image	Suburb	Opened	Grade	Connections	Time
	Continues from T1 Ipswich/Rosewood line					
Roma Street		Brisbane CBD	14 June 1875	Ground	Springfield line Doomben Cleveland line Gold Coast line Beenleigh line Brisbane Metro Bus transport in Queensland	0
Central		Brisbane CBD	18 August 1889	Built over	Redcliffe Peninsula line Doomben Shorncliffe line Airport line, Brisbane Ferny Grove line	2 (Note: Service dwells for two minutes.)
Fortitude Valley		Fortitude Valley	1 November 1890	Underground	Redcliffe Peninsula line Doomben Shorncliffe line Airport line, Brisbane Ferny Grove line	6
Bowen Hills		Bowen Hills	1973	Ground level	Redcliffe Peninsula line Doomben Shorncliffe line Airport line, Brisbane Ferny Grove line	8
Eagle Junction		Clayfield	1882	Ground level	Redcliffe Peninsula line Doomben Shorncliffe line Airport line, Brisbane	13
Northgate		Northgate	1882	Ground level	Redcliffe Peninsula line Shorncliffe line	17
Petrie		Petrie	1888	Ground level	Redcliffe Peninsula line	33
Dakabin		Kurwongbah	1888	Ground level	none	37
Narangba		Narangba	1888	Ground level	none	40
Burpengary		Burpengary	June 1888	Ground level	none	45
Morayfield		Morayfield	1888	Ground level	none	49
Caboolture		Caboolture	June 1889	Ground level	none	53
Elimbah		Elimbah	1890	Ground level	none	59
Beerburrum		Beerburrum	1890	Ground level	none	64
Glasshouse Mountains		Glass House Mountains	1890	Ground level	none	72
Beerwah		Beerwah	1890	Ground level	none	78
Landsborough		Landsborough	1890	Ground level	none	84
Mooloolah		Mooloolah Valley	1891	Ground level	none	90
Eudlo		Eudlo	1891	Ground level	none	96
Palmwoods		Palmwoods	1891	Ground level	none	102
Woombye		Woombye	1891	Ground level	none	107
Nambour		Nambour	January 1891	Ground level	none	112
Yandina		Yandina	30 December 1890	Ground level	none	122
Eumundi		Eumundi	1988	Ground level	none	129
Cooroy		Cooroy	17 July 1891	Ground level	none	137
Pomona		Pomona	1891	Ground level	none	146
Cooran		Cooran	10 June 1889	Ground level	none	154
Traveston		Traveston	1889	Ground level	none	163
Gympie North		Victory Heights	4 February 1989	Ground level	none	180
