= Caboolture railway station =

Railway station in Queensland, Australia

Caboolture
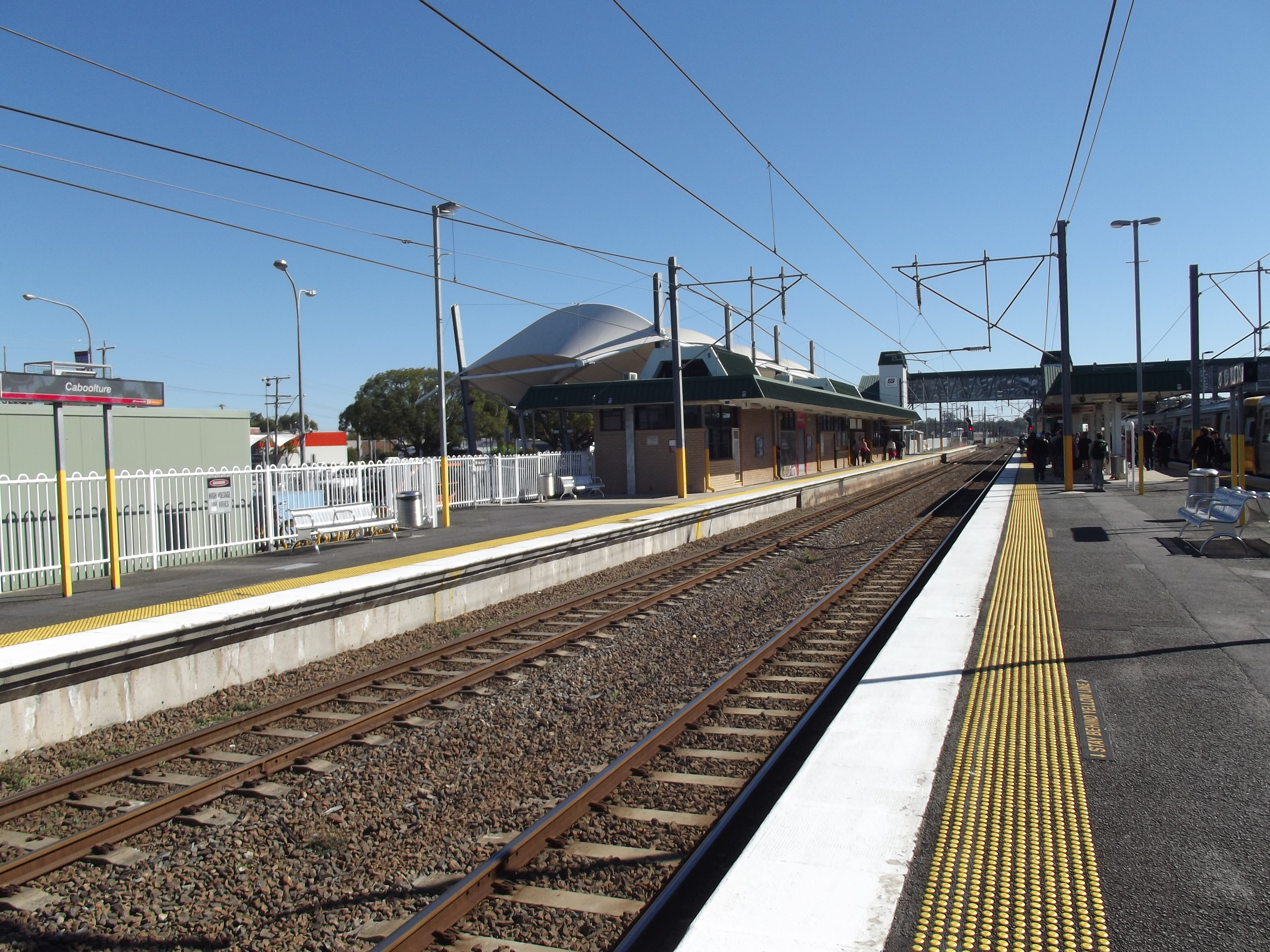
- Northbound view from Platform 2 in August 2012

General information
- Location: Matthew Terrace, Caboolture
- Coordinates: 27°4′56″S 152°57′11″E
- Owner: Queensland Rail
- Operator: Queensland Rail
- Lines: T1 Caboolture; T1 Nambour/Gympie North; Spirit of Queensland; Tilt Train; Spirit of the Outback
- Distance: 49.57 kilometres from Central
- Platforms: 3 (1 side, 1 island)
- Tracks: 3

Construction
- Structure type: Ground
- Parking: 675 spaces
- Cycle facilities: Yes
- Accessible: Yes

Other information
- Status: Staffed
- Station code: 600476 (platform 1); 600477 (platform 2); 600478 (platform 3)
- Fare zone: Zone 3
- Website: Queensland Rail

History
- Opened: June 1889
- Rebuilt: 16 November 1985

Services
Preceding station	Queensland Rail	Following station
Morayfield towards Ipswich or Rosewood	Caboolture line	Terminus
Morayfield towards Ipswich or Rosewood	Nambour/Gympie North line	Elimbah towards Nambour or Gympie North
Petrie towards Ipswich or Rosewood	Gympie North service	Elimbah towards Nambour or Gympie North
Long distance services
Brisbane Terminus	Spirit of Queensland	Landsborough towards Cairns
Brisbane Terminus	Tilt Train	Landsborough towards Rockhampton
Brisbane Terminus	Spirit of the Outback	Nambour towards Longreach
Location

Caboolture is a railway station operated by Queensland Rail on the Caboolture and Nambour/Gympie North lines. It opened in 1889 and serves the Moreton Bay suburb of Caboolture. It is a ground level station, featuring side platforms.

The station serves as the terminus for the Caboolture line. Long-distance services on the North Coast line, including the Spirit of Queensland, Tilt Train and Spirit of the Outback, stop at Caboolture.

== History ==
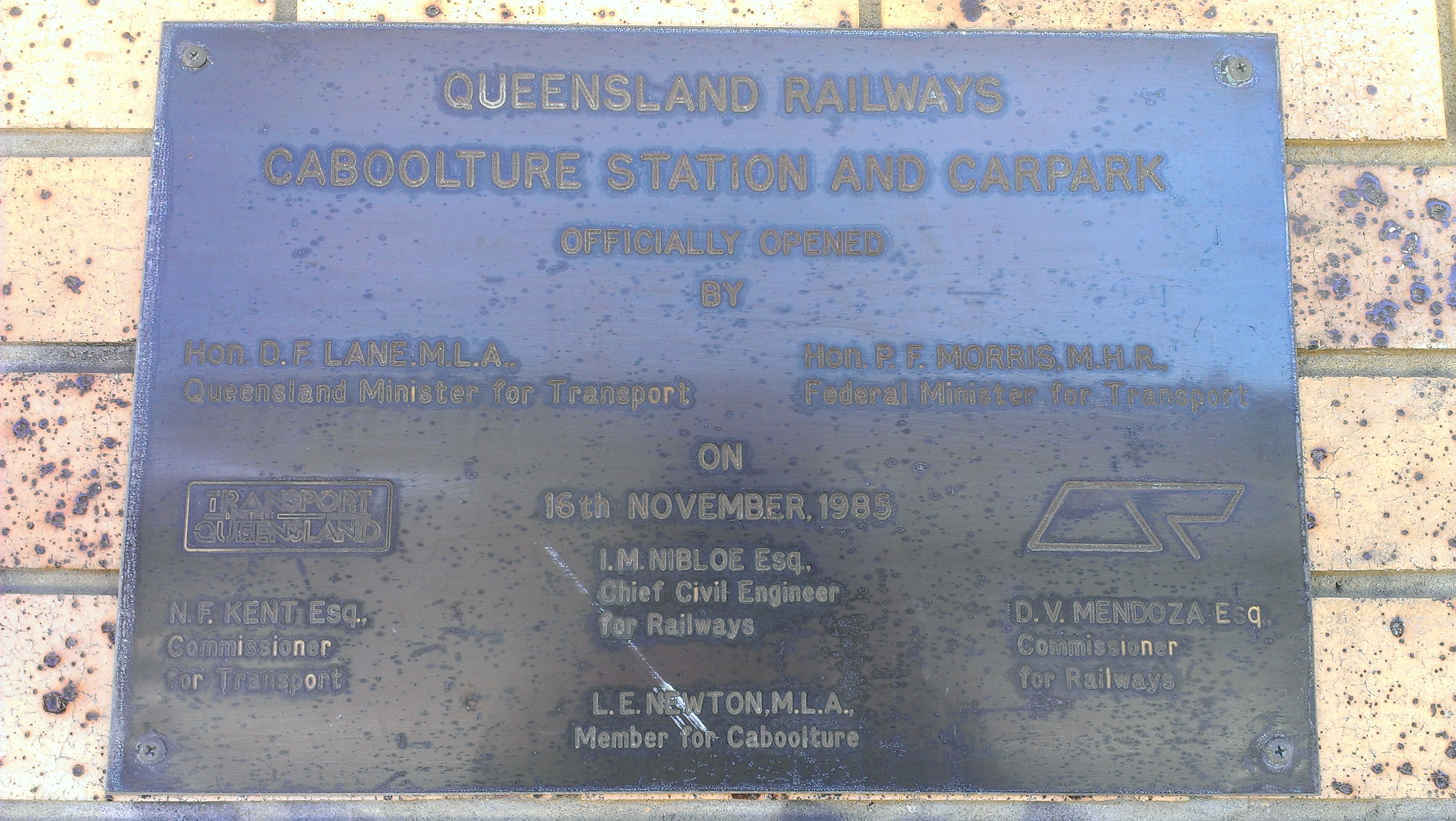
Official opening plaque, 16 November 1985

Caboolture station opened in June 1889 as part of the extension of the North Coast Line from Petrie, which opened in March 1888. As part of the electrification of the line from Petrie, the existing station building was replaced and a new island platform built. The new station opened on 16 November 1985, while the electrification opened on 28 June 1986.

The Kilcoy line branched off to the north-west. It opened in December 1909, closing in September 1996. An old turntable is located on the eastern side. Extensive stabling sidings exist around the station

== Services ==
Caboolture is the terminating point for all stops from Citytrain network services to Brisbane, many continuing to Ipswich, Rosewood and Springfield Central.

Caboolture is also being run by the Citytrain services,which run from the Nambour and Gympie North that only submit a limited amount of services to Caboolture. To relieve congestion on the single track North Coast line north of Beerburrum, the rail service is supplemented by a bus service operated by Kangaroo Bus Lines on weekdays between to Nambour as route 649.

Caboolture is also served by long-distance Traveltrain services; the Spirit of Queensland, Spirit of the Outback and the Bundaberg and Rockhamption Tilt Trains.

== Platforms and services ==
Caboolture platform arrangement
Platform	Lines	Destinations	Notes
1	T1 Caboolture	Roma Street (to Ipswich/Rosewood line)	
1	T1 Nambour/Gympie North	Roma Street (to Ipswich/Rosewood line)	
1	T1 Nambour/Gympie North	Nambour or Gympie North	
1	Spirit of Queensland	Cairns	
1	Spirit of Queensland	Roma Street	
1	Spirit of the Outback	Longreach	
1	Spirit of the Outback	Roma Street	
1	Tilt Train	Rockhampton	
1	Tilt Train	Roma Street	
2	T1 Caboolture	Roma Street (to Ipswich/Rosewood line)	
2	T1 Nambour/Gympie North	Roma Street (to Ipswich/Rosewood line)	
3	T1 Caboolture	Roma Street (to Ipswich/Rosewood line)	
3	T1 Nambour/Gympie North	Roma Street (to Ipswich/Rosewood line)	

== Bus routes by stop ==
The following bus routes services Caboolture railway station:

Stop	Route number	Destination	Locations/Roads Serving
Stop A	649	Nambour	Train Stations between Caboolture and Nambour. Some services run express
Stop A	895 (school days only)	Woodford	Caboolture High School, St Columban’s, Moodlu, Wamuran, Bracalba, D'Aguilar
Stop A	896 (school holidays & weekend only)	Kilcoy	Moodlu, Wamuran, Bracalba, D'Aguilar, Woodford, Stony Creek, Royston
Stop A	896 (school days only)	Kilcoy	St Columban’s, Moodlu, Wamuran, Bracalba, D'Aguilar, Woodford, Stony Creek, Royston
Stop B	660	Redcliffe	Morayfield, Burpengary, Deception Bay, Rothwell, Kippa-Ring station, Anzac Avenue (Rothwell to Redcliffe)
Stop C	640	Woorim	Ningi, Bribie Island park ‘n’ ride, Bribie Island Shopping Centre, Bongaree
Stop C	643	Bribie Island park ‘n’ ride	Sandstone Point
Stop C	651	Morayfield Shopping Centre	Caboolture North-West
Stop C	652	Beachmere	Beachmere Road
Stop C	653	Morayfield station	Bellmere, Caboolture South
Stop C	654 (drop-off only)	from Morayfield station	from Caboolture South, Bellmere
Stop C	655	Caboolture Hospital (loop)	Caboolture High School, Caboolture TAFE, Caboolture UniSC
Stop C	657	Caboolture North (loop)	Pumicestone State School
Stop C	9999 (Thursday AM)	Morayfield Shopping Centre	Caboolture Square
Stop C	9999 (Thursday PM)	Toorbul	Donnybrook

== Transport links ==
Caboolture Bus Lines operate nine routes to and from Caboolture station:

- 640: to Woorim/Bribie Island via Bribie Island Park & Ride
- 643: to Bribie Island Park & Ride via Sandstone Point
- 651: to Morayfield station & Caboolture West
- 652: to Beachmere
- 653: to Morayfield station via Bellmere
- 654: to Morayfield station via Bellmere
- 655: to Caboolture Hospital
- 657: to Caboolture North
- 9999: to Toorbul and Donnybrook (Thursday only)

Kangaroo Bus Lines operate two routes to and from Caboolture station:

- 649: to Nambour station
- 660: to Redcliffe

Christensen Bus & Coach operate two routes to and from Caboolture station:

- 895: to Woodford (school days only)
- 896: to Kilcoy via Woodford

Coast & Country operate a service to the Queensland University of Technology and TAFE campuses during school terms.

Purser's Coaches operate a service from Caboolture station to Murgon on Monday, Wednesday and Friday.

Kinetic Sunshine Coast operates a Sunshine Coast University service during school terms.
