= Nambour railway station =

Railway station in Queensland, Australia

Nambour
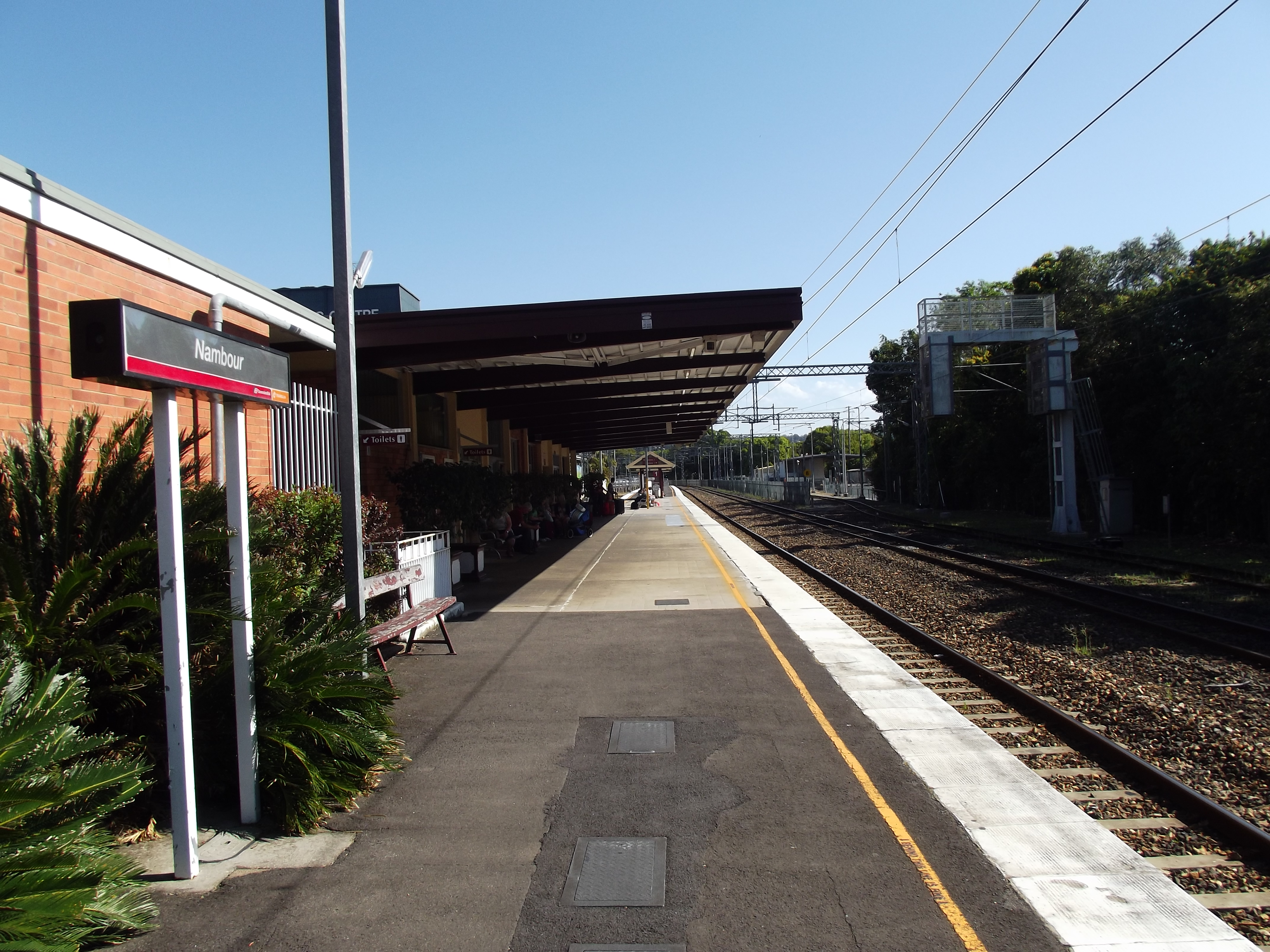
- Southbound view from Platform 1 in September 2012

General information
- Location: Civic Way, Nambour
- Coordinates: 26°37′31″S 152°57′30″E
- Owner: Queensland Rail
- Operator: Queensland Rail
- Lines: T1 Nambour/Gympie North; Spirit of Queensland; Tilt Train; Spirit of the Outback
- Distance: 103.83 kilometres from Central
- Platforms: 2 (1 side, 1 bay)
- Tracks: 4

Construction
- Structure type: Ground
- Parking: 89 spaces
- Cycle facilities: No
- Accessible: Yes

Other information
- Status: Staffed
- Station code: 600493
- Fare zone: Zone 6
- Website: Queensland Rail

History
- Opened: January 1891; 135 years ago
- Rebuilt: 16 December 1963; 62 years ago
- Electrified: 28 April 1988

Services
Preceding station	Queensland Rail	Following station
Woombye towards Ipswich or Rosewood via Roma Street	T1 Nambour/Gympie North line	Terminus
Woombye towards Ipswich or Rosewood via Roma Street	T1 Nambour/Gympie North line Gympie North service	Yandina towards Gympie North
Long distance services
Landsborough towards Brisbane	Spirit of Queensland	Cooroy towards Cairns
Landsborough towards Brisbane	Tilt Train	Cooroy towards Rockhampton
Caboolture towards Brisbane	Spirit of the Outback	Cooroy towards Longreach
Location

Nambour is a railway station operated by Queensland Rail on the Nambour/Gympie North line. It opened in 1891 and serves the Sunshine Coast town of Nambour. It is a ground level station, featuring one side platform and one bay platform.

It is the terminus for most Sunshine Coast line trains, although two daily services continue to Gympie North. Long-distance services on the North Coast line, including the Spirit of Queensland, Tilt Train and Spirit of the Outback, stop at Nambour.

== History ==
The railway connection from Brisbane to Nambour opened in January 1891. At that time, the town, then known as Petrie's Creek was renamed Nambour after the Nambour cattle station.

On 16 December 1963, the present station building was opened by Minister for Transport Gordon Chalk. On 11 August 1988, a bus station was opened outside the station by Minister for Transport Ivan Gibbs. South of the station lie stabling sidings for electric multiple units. In 2016 a major upgrade to the station commenced.

== Services ==
Nambour is the terminus for Citytrain network services from Brisbane with two services daily continuing to Gympie. To relieve congestion on the single track North Coast line, the rail service is supplemented by a bus service operated by Kangaroo Bus Lines on weekdays to Caboolture as route 649.

Nambour is also served by long-distance Traveltrain services; the Spirit of Queensland, Spirit of the Outback and theTilt Train.

== Services by platform ==
Nambour platform arrangement
Platform	Lines	Destinations	Notes
1	T1 Nambour/Gympie North	Gympie North	
1	T1 Nambour/Gympie North	Roma Street (to Ipswich/Rosewood line)	
1	Spirit of Queensland	Cairns	
1	Spirit of Queensland	Roma Street	
1	Spirit of the Outback	Longreach	
1	Spirit of the Outback	Roma Street	
1	Tilt Train	Rockhampton	
1	Tilt Train	Roma Street	
2	T1 Nambour/Gympie North	Gympie North	
2	T1 Nambour/Gympie North	Roma Street (to Ipswich/Rosewood line)	

== Transport links ==
Kinetic Sunshine Coast operate five bus routes to and from Nambour station:

- 610: to Sunshine Plaza via Kunda Park
- 612: to Sunshine Plaza via Bli Bli
- 630: to Noosa Junction via Doonan
- 631: to Noosa Junction via Cooroy
- 636: to University of the Sunshine Coast

Greyhound Australia operate services from Nambour station to Brisbane and Cairns.
