= Ipswich railway station, Queensland =

Railway station in Queensland, Australia

Ipswich
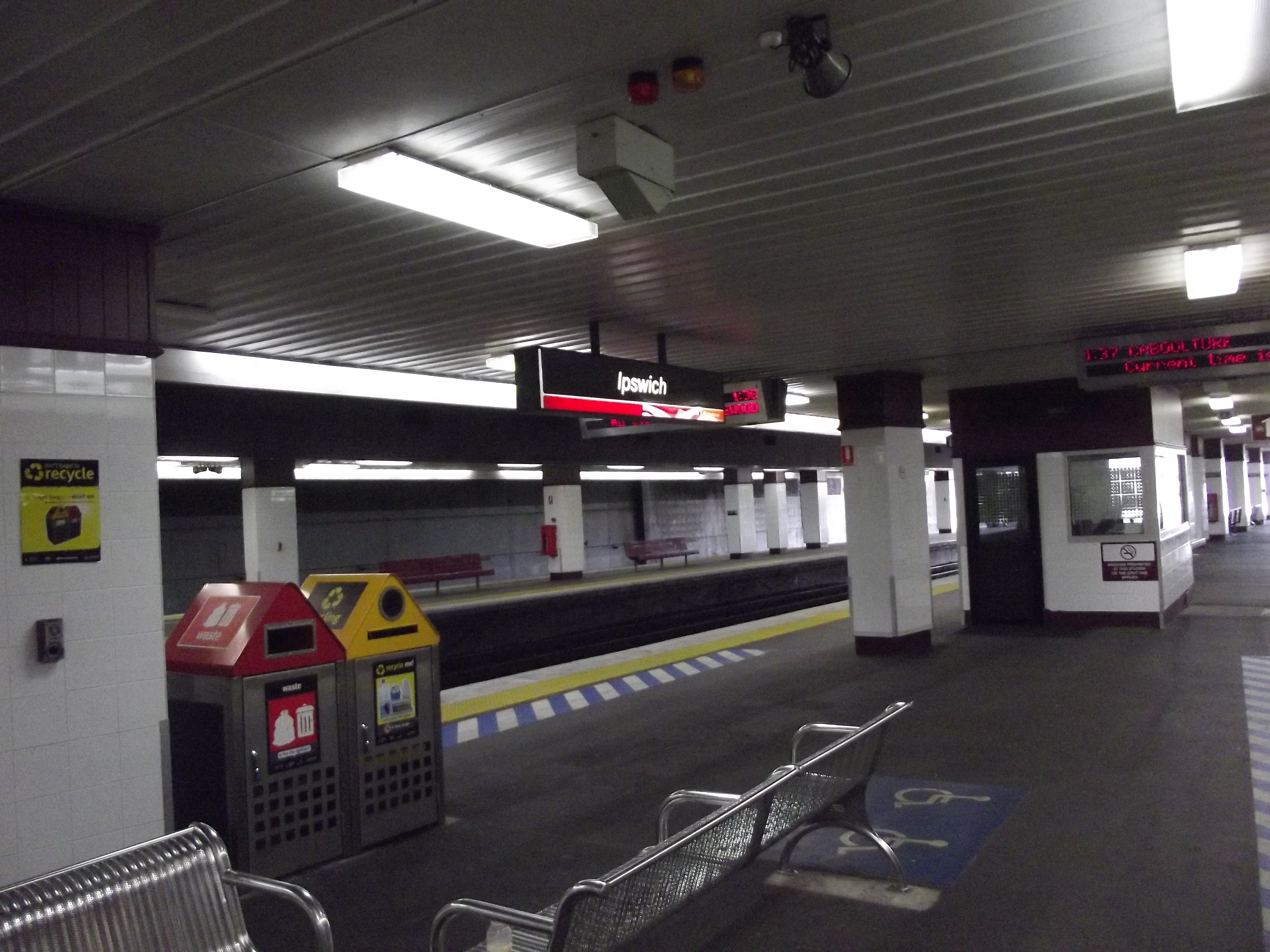
- View inside the station in May 2012

General information
- Location: Bell Street, Ipswich
- Coordinates: 27°36′47″S 152°45′37″E
- Elevation: 19 m (62 ft)
- Owner: Queensland Rail
- Operator: Queensland Rail
- Line: T1 Ipswich/Rosewood
- Distance: 38.64 kilometres from Central
- Platforms: 4 (2 island)
- Tracks: 4

Construction
- Structure type: Underground
- Parking: 77 bays
- Accessible: Yes

Other information
- Status: Staffed
- Station code: 600347 (platform 1); 600348 (platform 2); 600349 (platform 3); 600350 (platform 4)
- Fare zone: Zone 3
- Website: Queensland Rail; Translink timetable information

History
- Opened: 1865; 161 years ago
- Rebuilt: 1887; 139 years ago 1978; 48 years ago

Services
Preceding station	Queensland Rail	Following station
East Ipswich towards Caboolture via Roma Street	T1 Ipswich/Rosewood line	Terminus
East Ipswich towards Caboolture via Roma Street	T1 Ipswich/Rosewood line	Thomas Street towards Rosewood
Terminus	T1 Ipswich/Rosewood line Rosewood shuttle	Thomas Street towards Rosewood
Long distance services
Corinda towards Brisbane	The Westlander	Rosewood towards Charleville
Location

Ipswich is a railway station operated by Queensland Rail on the Ipswich/Rosewood line. It opened in 1865 and serves the urban centre of Ipswich. It is an underground station, featuring two island platforms with two faces each.

== History ==
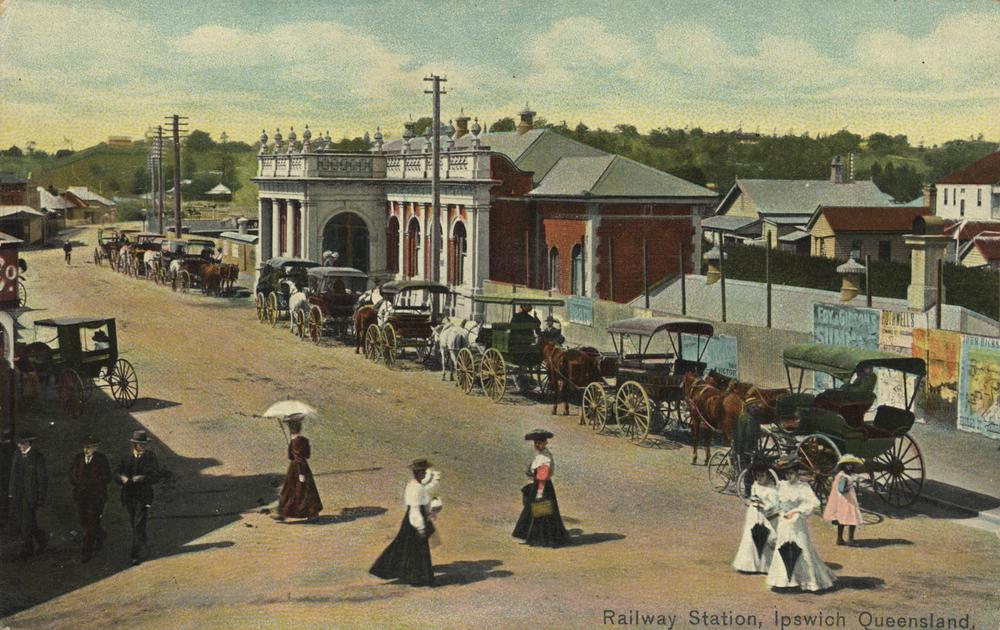
Ipswich Railway Station, circa 1906

The first railway station opened in Ipswich in 1865. It was the first railway station built in Queensland, as the first terminus for the 34 kilometre section of the Main line from Grandchester. In 1887, the station was completely rebuilt.

Two pieces of associated historic railway infrastructure are the:

- Railway Signal Cabin and Turntable which enabled trains to be turned onto different railway lines
- Bremer River Rail Bridge which connected the station to the North Ipswich Railway Workshops

The cabin, turnable, rail bridge and railway workshops are all listed on the Queensland Heritage Register.

The now-closed Dugandan railway line split from the Main Line railway at Ipswich.

In 1978, a large office and retail complex (currently known as Ipswich Central Plaza) was built above the station and spanning both sides of Bell Street following the sale of the air rights. On 20 September 1980, the line was electrified from Darra. The last remaining old platform and buildings were demolished in 1985.

== Platforms and services ==
Ipswich is served mainly by trains to and from Caboolture and Nambour, and is the terminus for the Rosewood shuttles. Some inbound services originate from Rosewood in the morning on-peak, and some outbound services continue to Rosewood in the afternoon peak.

The Caboolture and Nambour trains outside of peak times typically stop all stations to Bowen Hills, then run express from Bowen Hills to Petrie, stopping only at Eagle Junction and Northgate. During weekday morning on-peak times, the trains also run express from Darra to Milton, stopping only at Indooroopilly. Some weekday services continue past Petrie to Kippa-Ring instead of Caboolture or Nambour.

During morning on-peak times (6:00 am – 8:30 am, Monday to Friday), city bound services depart every six minutes at best, and during afternoon peak times (3:30 pm – 7:00 pm, Monday to Friday), terminating services arrive every 12 minutes at best. During off-peak times, Caboolture and Nambour services depart and arrive at half hourly intervals, with every second train being met by a Rosewood shuttle train. Weekday morning on-peak express services take 50 minutes to reach Central, and 58 minutes to reach Central on an off-peak all-stations service.

Ipswich is also served by Queensland Rail Travel's twice weekly Westlander service travelling between Brisbane and Charleville.

Ipswich platform arrangement
Platform	Line	Destination	Notes
1	T1 Ipswich/Rosewood	Roma Street (to Caboolture and Nambour/Gympie North lines)	
2	T1 Ipswich/Rosewood	Rosewood	
2	T1 Ipswich/Rosewood	Roma Street (to Caboolture and Nambour/Gympie North lines)	
3	T1 Ipswich/Rosewood	Rosewood	
3	T1 Ipswich/Rosewood	Roma Street (to Caboolture and Nambour/Gympie North lines)	
4	T1 Ipswich/Rosewood	Roma Street (to Caboolture and Nambour/Gympie North lines)	

== Transport links ==
Westside Bus Company operates nine bus routes from the Bell Street bus station, directly adjacent to Ipswich station:

- 500: Riverlink Shopping Centre to Goodna
- 502: Bundamba to Riverlink Shopping Centre via Blackstone
- 503: Bundamba to Riverlink Shopping Centre via Eastern Heights
- 506: Riverlink Shopping Centre to Leichardt & One Mile
- 509: Yamanto to Riverlink Shopping Centre
- 512: Brassall to Riverlink Shopping Centre
- 514: Moores Pocket to Booval
- 515: Brassall to Yamanto & Willowbank
- 529: to Toogoolawah via Lowood
