= Kangaroo Bus Lines =

Bus service operator

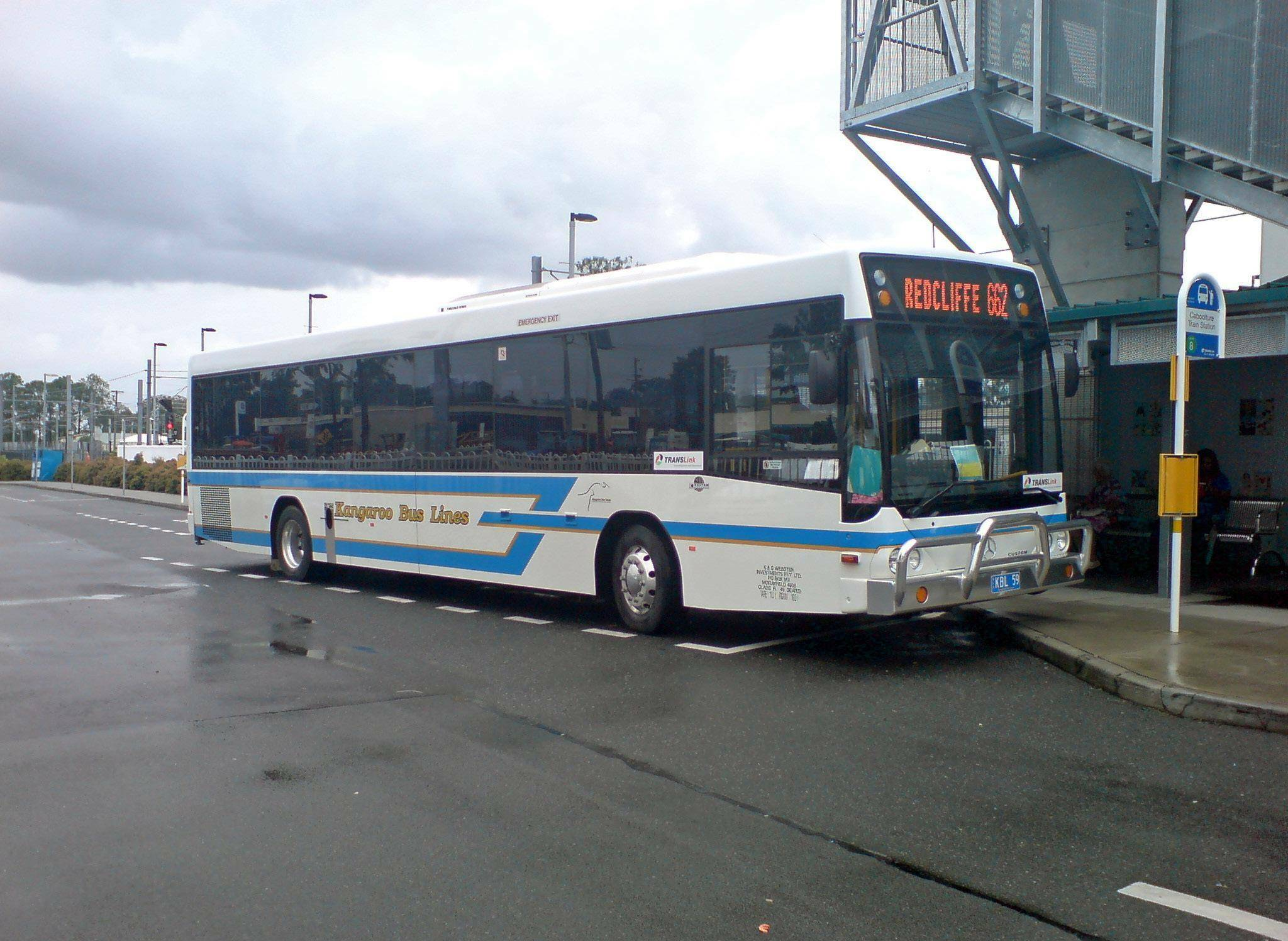
- Custom Coaches bodied Mercedes-Benz OC 500 LE at Caboolture station in March 2007
- Parent: Daryl Webster
- Headquarters: Burpengary
- Service area: City of Moreton Bay
- Service type: Bus & coach operator
- Routes: 8
- Stations: Caboolture; Morayfield; Nambour; Narangba
- Depots: 2
- Fleet: 142 (January 2024)
- Website: www.kangaroobuslines.com.au

Kangaroo Bus Lines is an Australian operator of bus services in the City of Moreton Bay in Queensland. It operates eight services under contract to the Queensland Government under the Translink banner.

== History ==
In 1978, Daryl Webster purchased Kangaroo Bus Lines with six buses. In 1980, the three-bus Narangba Bus Service was purchased.

In April 2012, Kangaroo Bus Lines relocated from Morayfield to its current headquarters at Burpengary.

In 2016, Kangaroo Bus Lines opened a new depot on the Sunshine Coast, at Kunda Park

In 2025, Kangaroo Bus Lines opened a new depot in Brisbane at Banyo. This depot was opened to reduce dead running and expand charter operations around the Brisbane Metropolitan Area.

== Routes ==
Route	From	To	Via	Notes
649	Caboolture	Nambour	Landsborough, all stations (some services operate express)	Rail Bus
660	Caboolture	Redcliffe	Morayfield, Burpengary, Deception Bay, Kippa-Ring station	
662	Deception Bay	Rothwell	Moreton Downs	
663	Narangba	Narangba	Narangba Valley	loop service
664	Burpengary	Burpengary	Burpengary station	loop service
665	Deception Bay	Rothwell	Deception Bay	loop service
667	Morayfield	Morayfield	Morayfield station & Morayfield Shopping Centre	loop service
668	Narangba	North Lakes	Endeavour Boulevard	

== Fleet ==
As at January 2024, the fleet consisted of 142 buses and coaches.
