= Central railway station, Brisbane =

Railway station in Brisbane, Queensland

Central
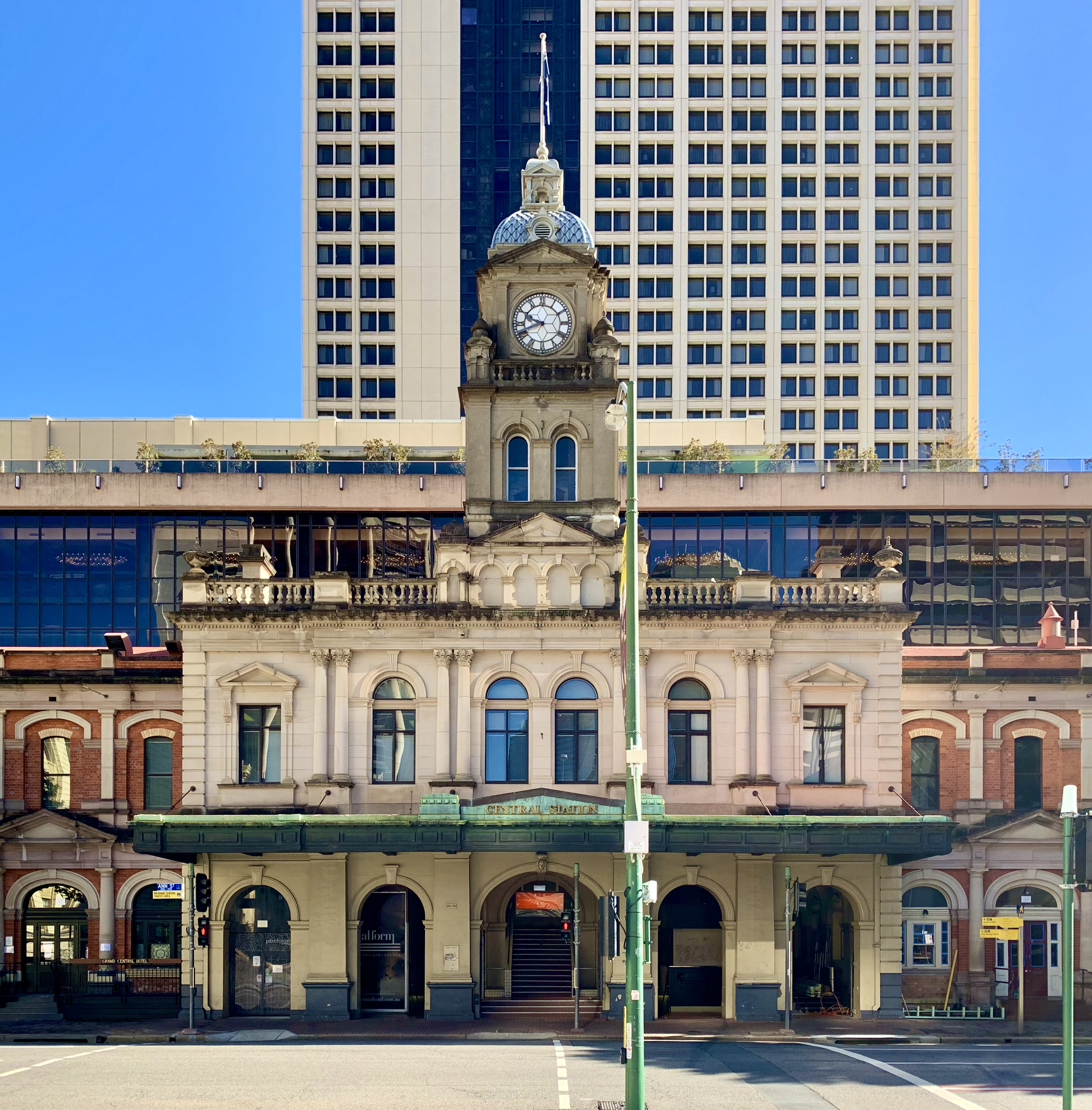
- Ann Street station building and entrance in June 2020

General information
- Location: Corner Ann & Edward Streets, Brisbane
- Coordinates: 27.4659°S 153.0261°E
- Owner: Queensland Rail
- Operator: Queensland Rail
- Lines: T5 Brisbane Airport; T1 Caboolture; T3 Doomben; T6 Ferny Grove; T2 Kippa-Ring; T4 Shorncliffe; T1 Nambour/Gympie North
- Platforms: 6 (3 islands)

Construction
- Structure type: Underground (Partly Sub-Terrain)
- Accessible: Yes

Other information
- Status: Staffed
- Station code: 600018 (platform 1); 600017 (platform 2); 600016 (platform 3); 600020 (platform 4); 600019 (platform 5); 600024 (platform 6)
- Fare zone: Zone 1
- Website: Queensland Rail

History
- Opened: 18 August 1889; 137 years ago

Services
Preceding station	Queensland Rail	Following station
Roma Street towards Varsity Lakes	Brisbane Airport line	Fortitude Valley towards Domestic Airport
Roma Street towards Ipswich or Rosewood	Caboolture line	Fortitude Valley towards Caboolture
Roma Street Terminus	Doomben line	Fortitude Valley towards Doomben
Roma Street towards Beenleigh	Ferny Grove line	Fortitude Valley towards Ferny Grove
Roma Street towards Springfield Central	Kippa-Ring line	Fortitude Valley towards Kippa-Ring
Roma Street towards Cleveland	Shorncliffe line	Fortitude Valley towards Shorncliffe
Roma Street towards Ipswich or Rosewood	Nambour/Gympie North line	Fortitude Valley towards Nambour or Gympie North
Location

Central railway station is located on the North Coast line in Queensland, Australia. It is the principal station on the City network and is located in the north of the Brisbane central business district. Central station is one of four inner city stations that form a core corridor through the centre of Brisbane.

== History ==
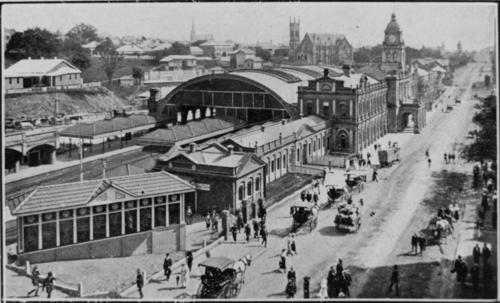
Looking east to the main station entrance across Ann & Edward Streets from the verandah of the People's Palace in 1911

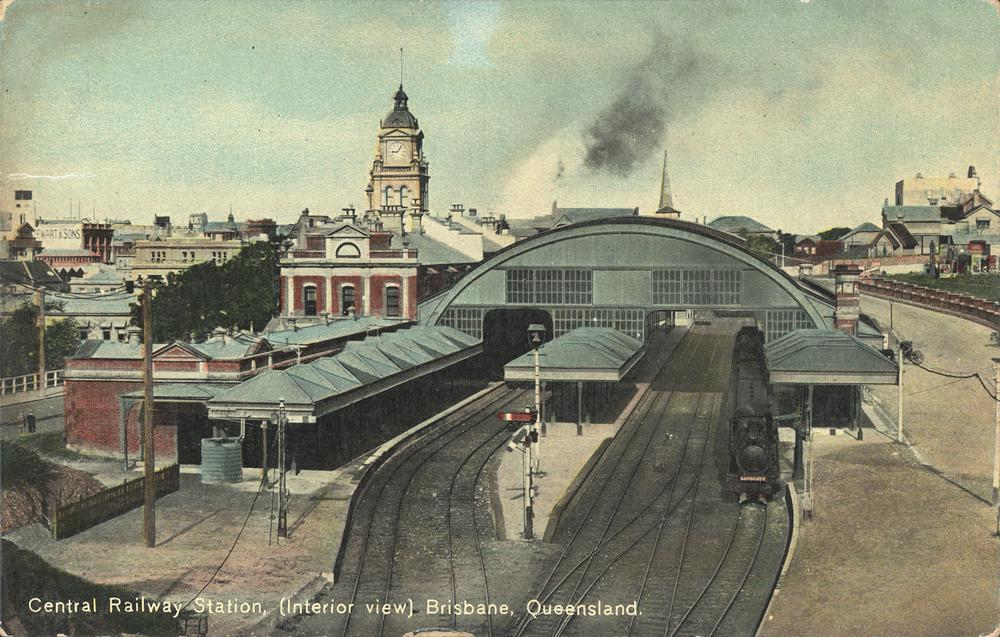
View to the west toward the platforms circa 1911

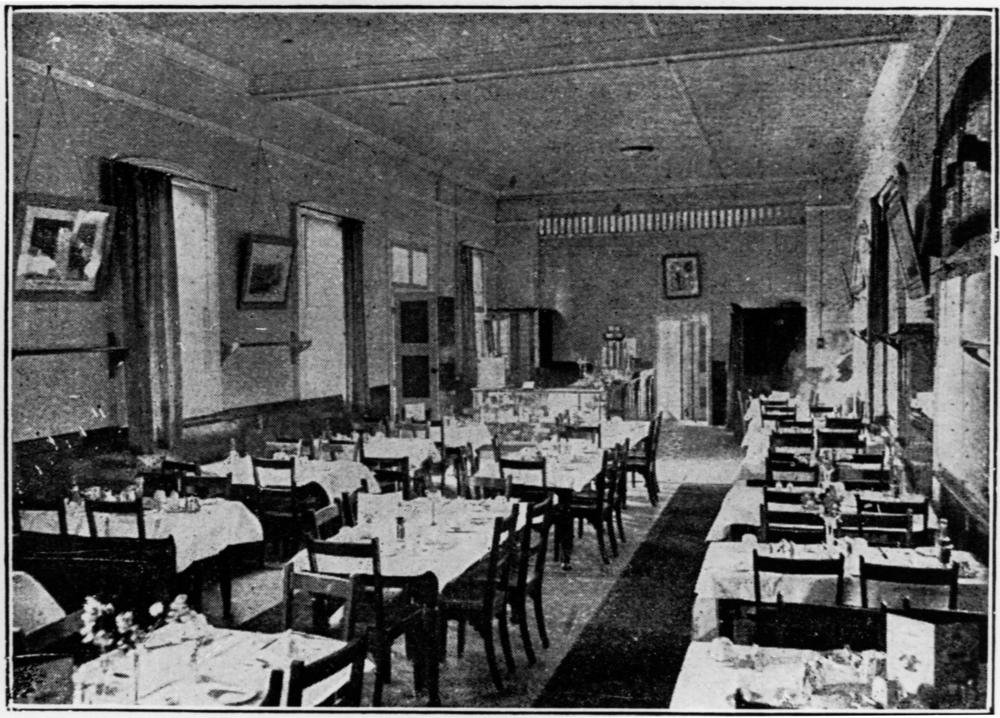
Central Station Cafe in Brisbane, 1927

The first building for Central railway station was a structure of wood and corrugated galvanised iron, and opened on 18 August 1889 as the terminus of the line when it was extended from Roma Street railway station. In 1891, the tunnel to Brunswick Street station (now Fortitude Valley) was opened so trains could run directly from Central to northern destinations.

An elegant new station was constructed and opened in 1899 with arches of corrugated galvanised iron over the platforms and a portico on Ann Street. A new entrance with its distinctive row of clocks was constructed in 1901 in sandstone from nearby quarries. In 1904, Central had the only electro-pneumatic system in Australia for changing points and signals.

The station had two through and two bay platforms. In 1909, the bay platforms were converted to through platforms.

In the 1940s, an American soldier was arrested after stabbing a Brisbane woman and a group of Australian soldiers.

Ann Street was widened in 1954 for the construction of government offices which required the portico to be demolished. The vaulted roof was removed in 1966 and replaced by awnings over each platform.

Between 1968 and 1970, the station was redeveloped with office towers built over the platforms at the Edward Street end, involving the demolition of the 1901 entrance buildings and the construction of a modern pedestrian retail concourse behind the old station buildings. Further redevelopment saw the Sheraton Hotel Towers (now Sofitel Brisbane) constructed in 1984 over the remaining platforms.

As part of the quadruplication of the line from Roma Street station to Bowen Hills, Platforms 5 and 6 opened on 11 June 1996.

In early 2017, a major upgrade to the station commenced.

== Station configuration ==
Central railway station is located at the northern end of the Brisbane central business district on Ann Street, directly opposite Anzac Square. Pedestrian access is available from the main entrance at the corner of Ann and Edward Streets, the pedestrian subway connecting Anzac Square with Upper Edward Street and from the corner of Ann Street and Creek Street. Lesser used access points are located off Wickham Terrace and from Edward Street via the courtyard of the Railway Centre.

There is lift access to Central Station from Ann Street opposite the Shrine of Remembrance, and from Wickham Terrace on the northern corner of the complex. There are also escalators to Central station from Anzac Square Arcade, next to Anzac Square.

== Services ==
Central station is served by all suburban and interurban City network lines. Also see Inner City timetable.

== Platforms and services ==
Central platform arrangement
Platform	Line	Destination	Notes
1&2	Airport	Roma Street (to Gold Coast line)	
1&2	Ferny Grove	Roma Street (to Beenleigh line)	
1&2	Shorncliffe	Roma Street (to Cleveland line)	
3&4	Airport	Domestic Airport	
3&4	Doomben	Doomben	
3&4	Ferny Grove	Ferny Grove	
3&4	Shorncliffe	Shorncliffe	
3&4	Sunshine Coast	Nambour or Gympie North	
5	Caboolture	Roma Street (to Ipswich/Rosewood line)	
5	Redcliffe Peninsula	Roma Street (to Springfield line)	
5	Sunshine Coast	Roma Street (to Ipswich/Rosewood line)	
6	Caboolture	Caboolture	
6	Redcliffe Peninsula	Kippa-Ring	
6	Sunshine Coast	Nambour or Gympie North	
