= Gympie North railway station =

Railway station in Queensland, Australia

Gympie North
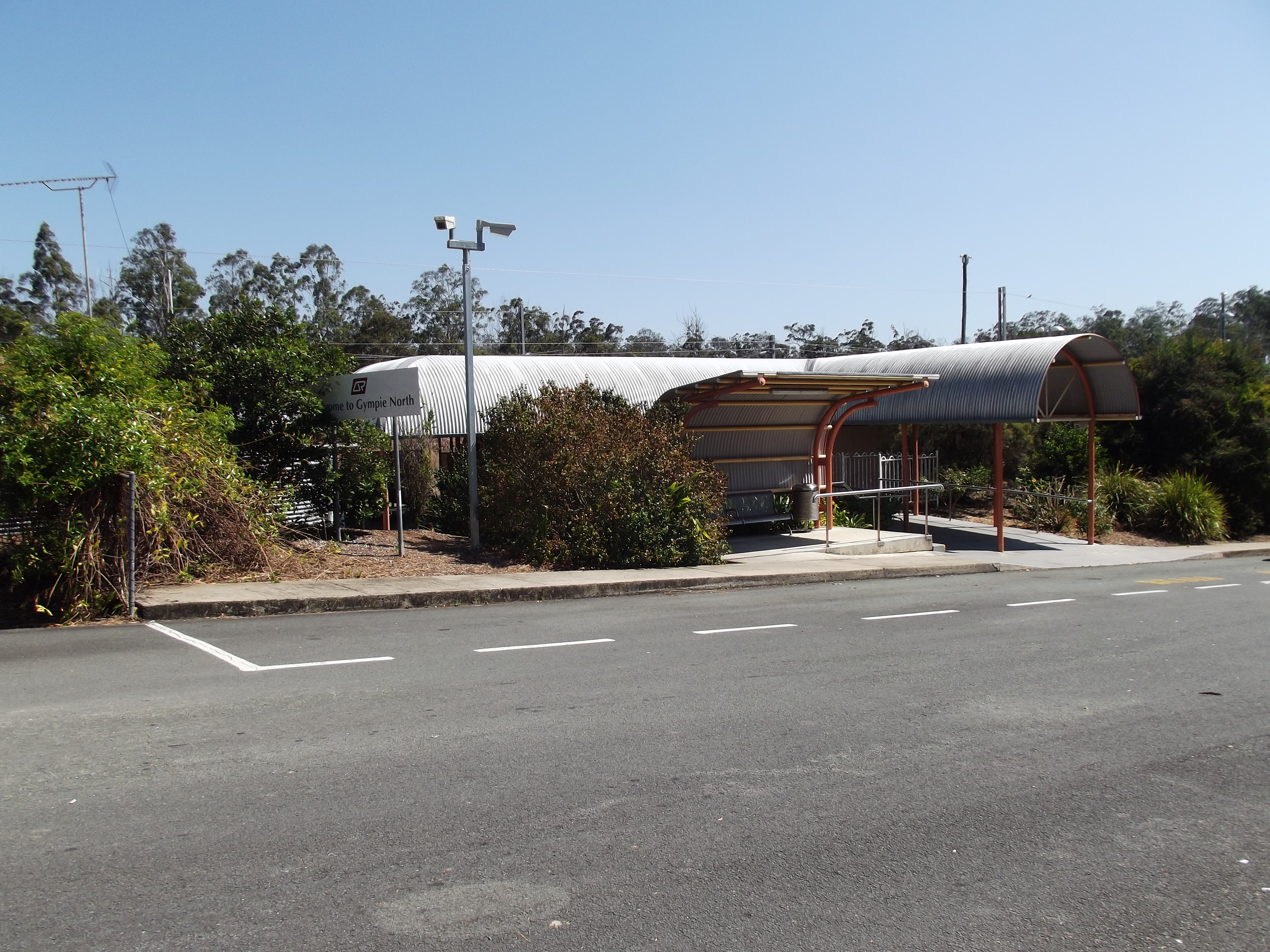
- Station entrance in September 2012

General information
- Location: Rocky Ridge Road, Victory Heights
- Coordinates: 26°09′30″S 152°40′55″E
- Owner: Queensland Rail
- Operator: Queensland Rail
- Lines: T1 Nambour/Gympie North; Spirit of Queensland; Tilt Train; Spirit of the Outback
- Distance: 172.21 kilometres from Central
- Platforms: 1
- Tracks: 4

Construction
- Structure type: Ground
- Parking: 25 spaces
- Accessible: Yes

Other information
- Status: Staffed
- Station code: 600500
- Fare zone: Zone 8
- Website: Queensland Rail

History
- Opened: 4 February 1989

Services
Preceding station	Queensland Rail	Following station
Traveston towards Roma Street	T1 Nambour/Gympie North line Gympie North service	Terminus
Long distance services
Cooroy towards Brisbane	Spirit of Queensland	Maryborough West towards Cairns
Cooroy towards Brisbane	Tilt Train	Maryborough West towards Rockhampton
Cooroy towards Brisbane	Spirit of the Outback	Maryborough West towards Longreach
Location

Gympie North is a railway station operated by Queensland Rail on the Nambour/Gympie North line. It opened in 1989 and is located in the Gympie locality of Victory Heights. It is a ground level station, featuring one side platform, and serves as the primary railway station for the Gympie Region.

It is the terminus for the Sunshine Coast line and the south-east Queensland rail network as a whole. Long-distance services on the North Coast line, including the Spirit of Queensland, Tilt Train and the Spirit of the Outback, stop at Gympie North.

== History ==
Gympie North was opened on 4 February 1989 as a replacement for Gympie station, when the latter was bypassed by a new eight kilometre alignment that was built as part of the electrification of the North Coast line.

The station consists of one platform.

== Services ==
Gympie North is the northern boundary of the Translink network. It is serviced by two daily Citytrain network services towards Brisbane Roma Street.

Gympie North is also served by long-distance Traveltrain services; the Spirit of Queensland, Spirit of the Outback and the Bundaberg and Rockhamption Tilt Trains.

A free shuttle bus operates between the station and Gympie town centre.

== Platforms and services ==
Gympie North platform arrangement
Platform	Lines	Destinations	Notes
1	T1 Nambour/Gympie North	Roma Street (to Ipswich/Rosewood line)	
1	Spirit of Queensland	Cairns	
1	Spirit of Queensland	Roma Street	
1	Spirit of the Outback	Longreach	
1	Spirit of the Outback	Roma Street	
1	Tilt Train	Rockhampton	
1	Tilt Train	Roma Street	
