= Rail electrification in Queensland =

In the late 1970s and 1980s, a significant rail electrification program was completed in the Australian state of Queensland. The electrified Queensland network is the largest in Australia with over 2,000 kilometres electrified, the next biggest is New South Wales with 640 kilometres, that is served mainly as passenger operations.

Today all suburban passenger services in South East Queensland are operated by Queensland Rail electric multiple units, as well as electric tilt train services as far as Rockhampton. An extensive network of freight lines are operated to service the Central Queensland coal networks is operated by Aurizon. The two networks are joined by the electrified North Coast line from Brisbane to Rockhampton, and the entire system is energised at 25 kV AC.

== History ==
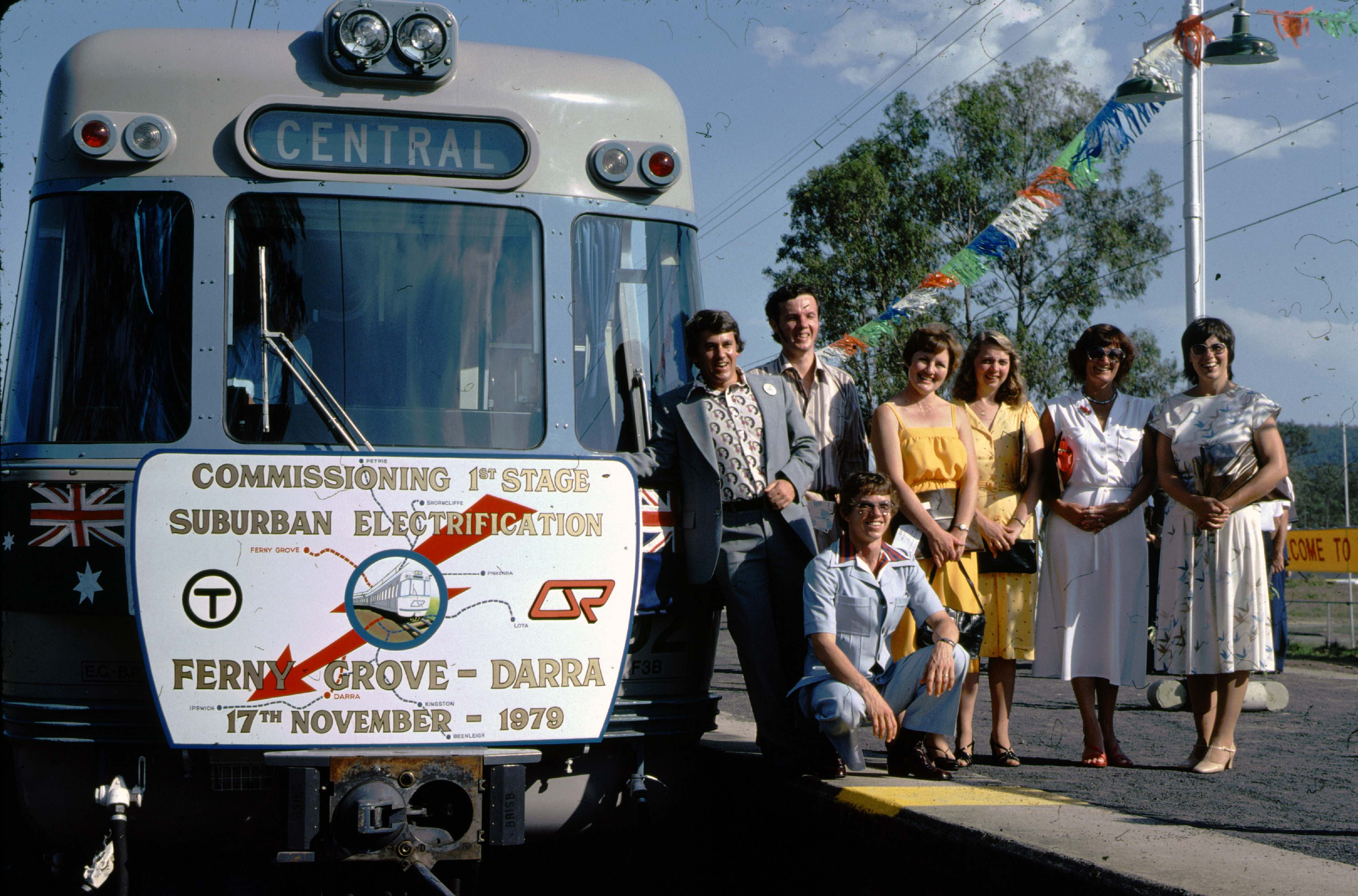
EMU at Ferny Grove station for the opening of the Ferny Grove to Darra rail electrification on 17 November 1979

In the 1980s, three significant programs were completed:

- Brisbane suburban network, opened between 1979 and 1988
- Blackwater and Goonyella coal networks (including the Central West line as far as Emerald) opened in 1986/87
- Caboolture to Gladstone section of the North Coast line opened in 1988/89

Since then there have been a number of new lines opened that have been electrified. As at 2014, 2,033 km of the 7,739 km Queensland network was electrified.

== Brisbane suburban electrification ==
=== Earlier proposals ===
The first electrification proposal was in 1897 when the chief engineer of the Queensland Railways was sent to study electrified railways in Europe and America. At the time the technology was in its infancy, and the costs outweighed the benefits, with Brisbane having a population of just 120,000. Further studies were carried out in 1915, and three decades later more investigations were carried out.

After World War II the Brisbane suburban network had become run down, and coal shortages were affecting the ability to run regular services. A committee was appointed to investigate, delivering their report in November 1947. It recommended the electrification of the suburban network by 1959 with the 1.5 kV DC system. 290 km (180 mi) of single track including sidings would be involved, covering the lines to Shorncliffe, Yeerongpilly via Sherwood, Ferny Grove, Petrie, Pinkenba and Kingston. The report was adopted in February 1950 and preliminary works started.

However, the General Manager of QR's South Eastern Division decided track amplification was more important, with quadruplication of the line from Corinda to Zillmere given priority. A cutback in loan funds in 1952-53 slowed the works further, and a change of state government in 1957 saw the scheme abandoned in 1959. The main legacies of the project were the quadruplication of the Roma Street to Corinda section and the 112 stainless steel locomotive-hauled SX carriages, that were intended to be converted to electric multiple units at a later date. Built by Commonwealth Engineering between 1961 and 1963, they replaced older wooden stock and were the first stainless steel carriages in suburban traffic, and improved passenger comfort.

In 1965, a transport study recommended the closure of the entire suburban railway network except for an electrified corridor between Darra and Zillmere. In 1970, another study recommended the electrification of the entire network with the 1.5 kV DC system, and the construction of a link between South Brisbane and Roma Street (later realised as the Merivale Bridge).

=== Construction approved ===
In 1973, the federal government under Gough Whitlam offered the states a two-thirds subsidy on approved public passenger transport projects. The Queensland Government announced that it intended to electrify and modernize the Brisbane suburban network, but the Federal funding did not materialise and the state ended up funding the project itself. In 1974, Elrail Consultants and Transmark were engaged to advise of the design of the system, which was changed from 1.5 kV DC to the more efficient 25 kV AC system, following the British Rail Mark 3A standard of electrification, enabling the number of substations to be significantly reduced. Tenders were called in 1975 for the electrification of 150 route kilometres (250 track kilometres) of lines.

Work to improve overhead clearances for the catenary, and track amplification was also carried out. A new four-track capable tunnel was built between Brunswick Street (now Fortitude Valley) and Bowen Hills stations, and the tunnel floors were lowered between Central and Fortitude Valley, and Central and Roma Street . A new operations centre was opened at Mayne and the city sections of the network were resignalled. A flyover was built at Mayne for the Ferny Grove line to eliminate junction conflicts, and to serve the new electric car sidings. Work was also started on the Merivale Bridge to link the two halves of the network, separated by the Brisbane River. The Petrie to Caboolture section was rebuilt with five deviations to permit 100 km/h running speeds over the entire line, with similar deviation works carried out on the Beenleigh line.

=== Construction begins ===
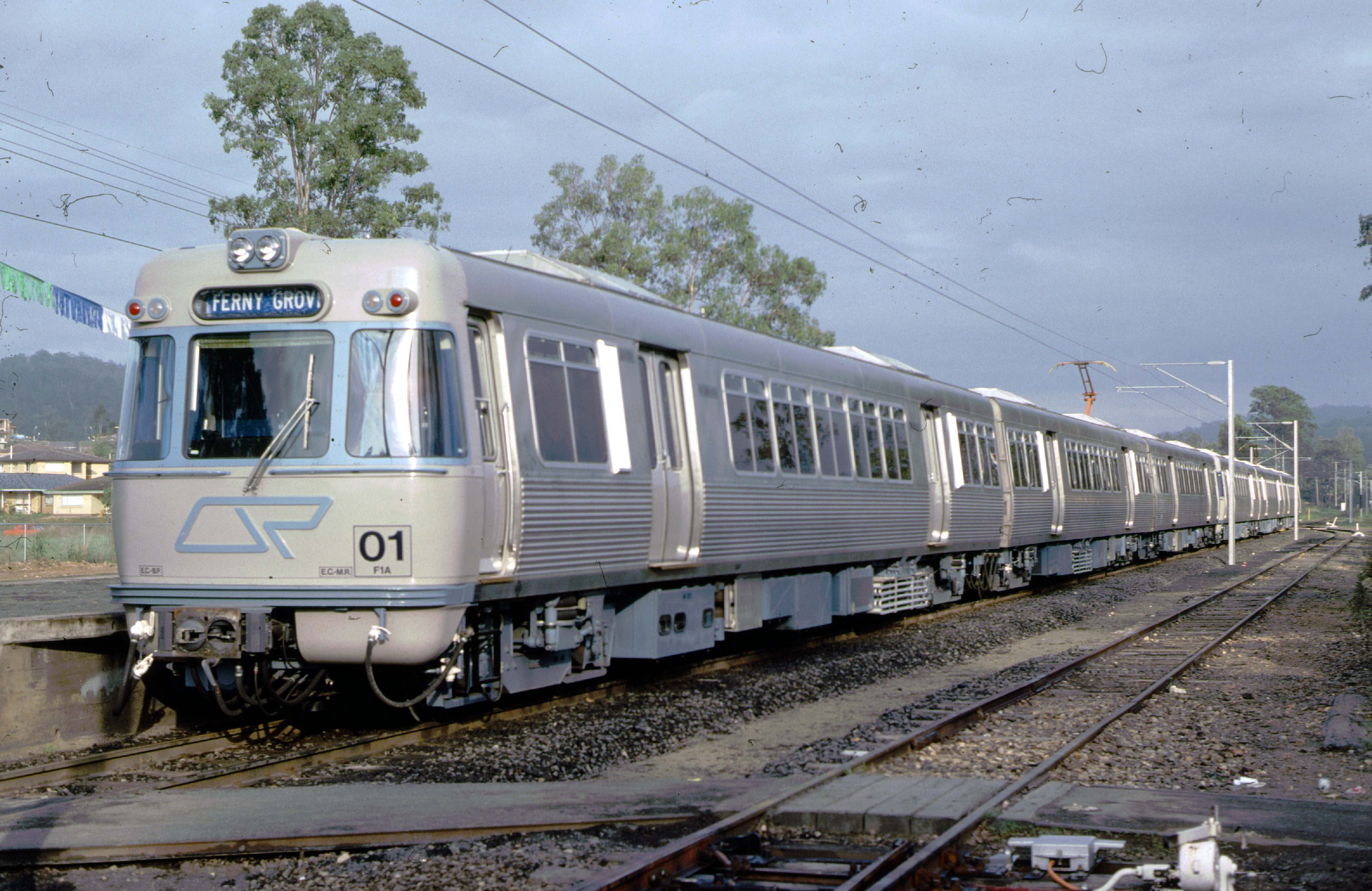
EMU01 at Ferny Grove station for the opening of the Ferny Grove to Darra rail electrification on 17 November 1979

Work began on erecting catenary on 16 May 1977, with a ceremony for the digging of the first post hole held at Ferny Grove station. The Ferny Grove to Darra section of line was chosen to be first due to the steep gradients and frequent stops. The contract for the trains themselves was awarded in 1977 to a consortium of Walkers Limited of Maryborough and ASEA of Sweden. The EMUs featured acceleration of 0.75 m/s^{2} (2.46 ft/s^{2}) and braking of 1.0 m/s^{2} (3.28 ft/s^{2}) enabling an all-stops train to operate a Ferny Grove service in 25 minutes, an eight-minute saving over diesel-hauled services.

On 8 May 1979, the first section of the new system was energized, from Roma Street to Corinda to permit testing and driver training. On 17 November the same year, the Darra to Ferny Grove and Mayne Depot sections were officially opened. Although only four three-car sets were available for traffic at the time, services commenced between Darra to Ferny Grove on 19 November 1979. All off-peak services were able to be provided by the four units, but most peak hour services remained diesel hauled, with additional EMU units introduced as they were delivered.

Further commissioning dates were:

- Darra to Ipswich 20 September 1980
- Roma Street to Fortitude Valley (via Normanby and Exhibition line) 3 March 1982
- Bowen Hills to Shorncliffe, Roma Street to Kingston, Corinda to Yeerongpilly (down line only) all on 18 September 1982
- Northgate to Petrie 23 April 1983
- Park Road and Dutton Park to Thorneside 15 October 1983
- Kingston to Beenleigh, Yeerongpilly to Corinda (up line), Indooroopilly to Chelmer (via Main line) all on 3 November 1984
- Petrie to Caboolture 28 June 1986
- Thorneside to Wellington Point 26 July 1986
- Wellington Point to Cleveland 24 October 1987
- Eagle Junction to Eagle Farm 6 February 1988 (although services today only operate as far as Doomben)

The Roma Street to Mayne connection via Normanby enabled the operation of electric trains to the 1982 Brisbane Exhibition. The line to Yeerongpilly enabled the operation of trains between Sunnybank and Ipswich for the 1982 Commonwealth Games.

Whilst the Pinkenba line was the final to be electrified under this program, completing the electrification of the Brisbane suburban network as it was at the time, the Thorneside to Cleveland sections were electrified from opening. The original 'rural' branch line to Cleveland (opened 1889) was closed beyond Lota in 1960, but the local government retained the corridor, which allowed the line to be rebuilt to contemporary standards as a suburban line and serve the expanding Greater Brisbane area only a generation later. The new terminal station was the former Raby Bay station, one station before the original Cleveland station, purportedly to facilitate extension of the line to Redland Bay in the future.

Despite the introduction of electric trains some diesel hauled services continued, such as to Pinkenba, which continued beyond the end of the wires on the Doomben line until September 1993.

The benefits of electrification were soon realised, with patronage increasing 60–65% on most lines in the first full year of operation.

=== Subsequent expansion ===
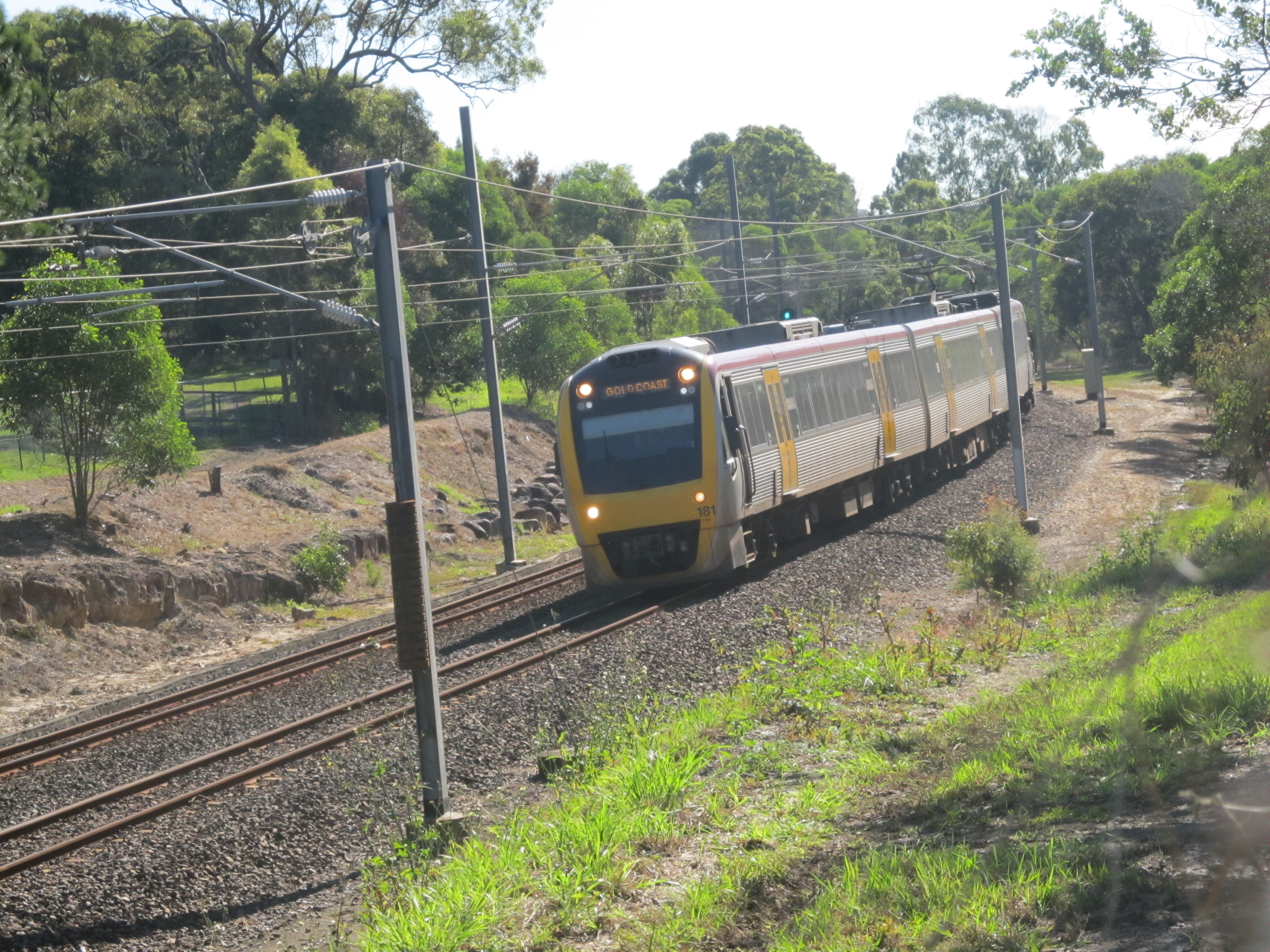
Interurban multiple unit on the Gold Coast line in June 2012

Electrification of the Main Line west of Ipswich 18 km to Rosewood opened in 1993.

In 1983, the State Government announced an investigation into the reconstruction of the Gold Coast railway as far as Robina after the lacking interest of rail transport forced the closure of the South Coast line. Construction was approved in 1991, the railway being electrified when opened from Beenleigh to Helensvale in 1996, and was extended to Robina in 1997, and to Varsity Lakes in 2009. This was another situation of a contemporary replacement for a former line (the South Coast line), though in this case there was a new alignment adopted allowing 160 km maximum speed, though units currently operate at 140 km/h. There are plans to extend the line to Gold Coast Airport, though not until 2025 at the earliest.

The growth in patronage as a result of electrification resulted in the quadruplication of the Roma Street to Northgate section in 1996, including two pairs of single track tunnels and the realisation of the use of the Bowen Hills tunnel widened 20 years earlier. Some of the roadbed and bridge abutments had been built in the 1950s before the original scheme was abandoned. A third line has been added to Petrie as part of the construction of the Redcliffe Peninsula line which opened in October 2016.

A third line has also been added from South Brisbane to Kuraby, including the dual gauging of the standard gauge line to Acacia Ridge, with proposals to extend it to Kingston.

The Airport line opened from Eagle Junction to the Brisbane Airport in 2001. The Springfield line opened from Darra to Richlands in 2011, being extended to Springfield Central in December 2013. In October 2016, the Redcliffe Peninsula line opened from Petrie to Kippa-Ring

With the introduction of the Translink integrated electronic ticketing system, electric services on the North Coast line to Nambour and Gympie, and on the Main Line west of Ipswich to Rosewood are considered part of the Brisbane suburban network.

== Coal system scheme ==
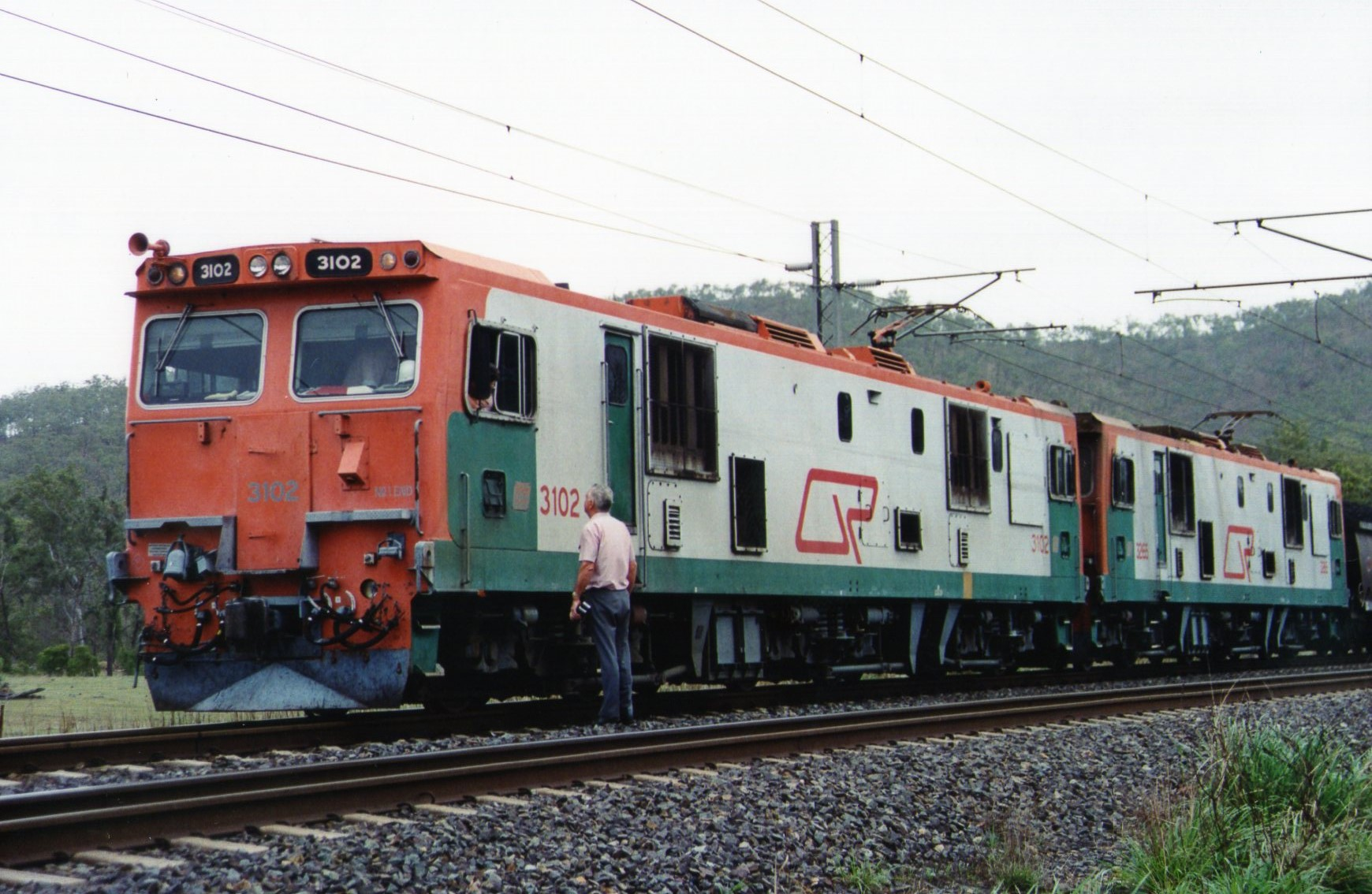
3100 class on the Goonyella line in 1991

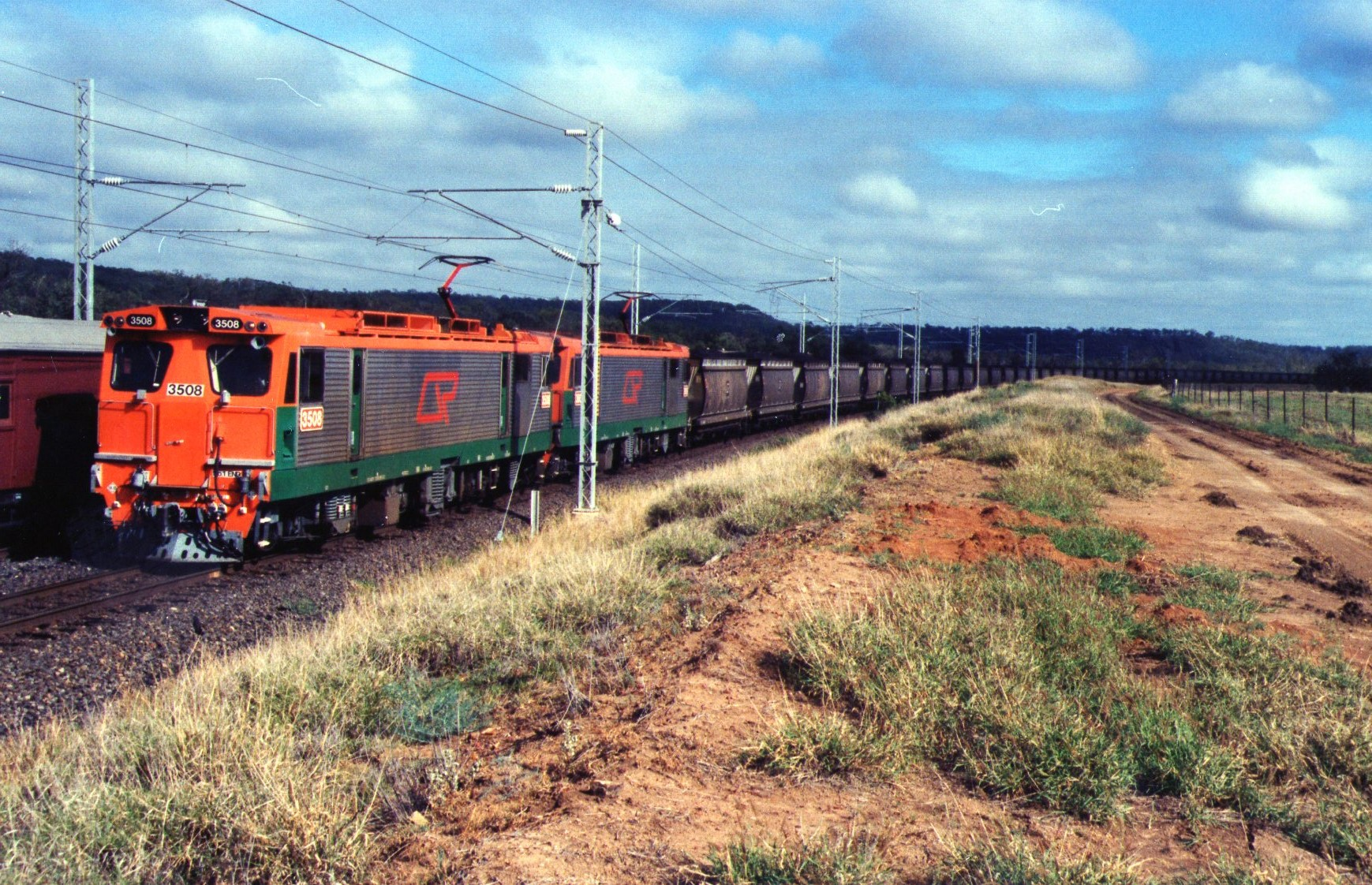
3500 class on the Blackwater line in 1993

The efficiencies shown by the suburban electrification, and the fact the diesel locomotive fleet was due for renewal, led to an investigation of the potential benefits in electrifying the Central Queensland coal networks in 1979. A four-stage scheme was approved in 1983, the stages being:

- Stage 1 – Gladstone to Blackwater and associated coal lines
- Stage 2 – Hay Point (near Mackay) to Goonyella and associated coal lines
- Stage 3 – Burngrove to Emerald
- Stage 4 – Abbot Point (near Bowen) to Newlands

The Blackwater system was given priority because it would achieve greater fuel savings, as its coal trains were interrupted by general traffic, and the first section was commissioned in September 1986.

The first section of the Goonyella system, from Hay Point to Peak Downs Mine, was commissioned on 29 May 1987, and extended to Saraji coal mine on 4 June 1987 and the balance to Gregory Junction in September that year.

The Emerald extension was to enable goods traffic from further west to be electrically hauled, and in anticipation of coal mines developing in the area. It involved relaying the entire section with 50 kg/m rail, some curve easing and replacing all timber bridges with concrete structures.

Stage 4 was subsequently amended to be the Caboolture to Gladstone project covered below, and Newlands line coal trains remain diesel hauled.

=== Implementation ===
The Gladstone to Rockhampton section opened on 6 September 1986, and was extended to Curragh coal mine on 29 May 1987, with the remaining coal lines being commissioned over the remainder of 1987. Some upgrading of the lines was undertaken as part of the scheme, such as realigning any curves sharper than 600m radius so a constant 60 km/h speed for loaded trains could be achieved. Empty trains travel at 80 km/h.

The Hay Point to Coppabella coal mine section opened in May 1987, and the entire system was in operation by the end of that year. This stage included electrifying the connection to the Blackwater system, providing an alternative route in situations of line disruption, but the two systems otherwise operate independently.

The Emerald section was opened on 30 October 1987 after the line was extensively upgraded, including being relaid with 50 kg/m rail, the first use of rail of this weight in Queensland. To date no electric coal trains use this section, and the Minerva mine on the Springsure branch is served by diesel locomotives.

Included in the scheme was the order of 146 3000 kW tri-bo 3100/3200 and 3500/3600 class locomotives, later increased to 166 to include the North Coast line requirements. Additional 3800 class locomotives have since been added to the fleet with a power output of 4000 kW.

The advances in diesel locomotive development in the 1990s changed the cost-benefit aspects of electrification, and the 107 km Bauhinia line from Kinrola to Rolleston was not electrified when opened in 2006. Due to increased tonnage being hauled, it was electrified in December 2014.

== North Coast line scheme ==
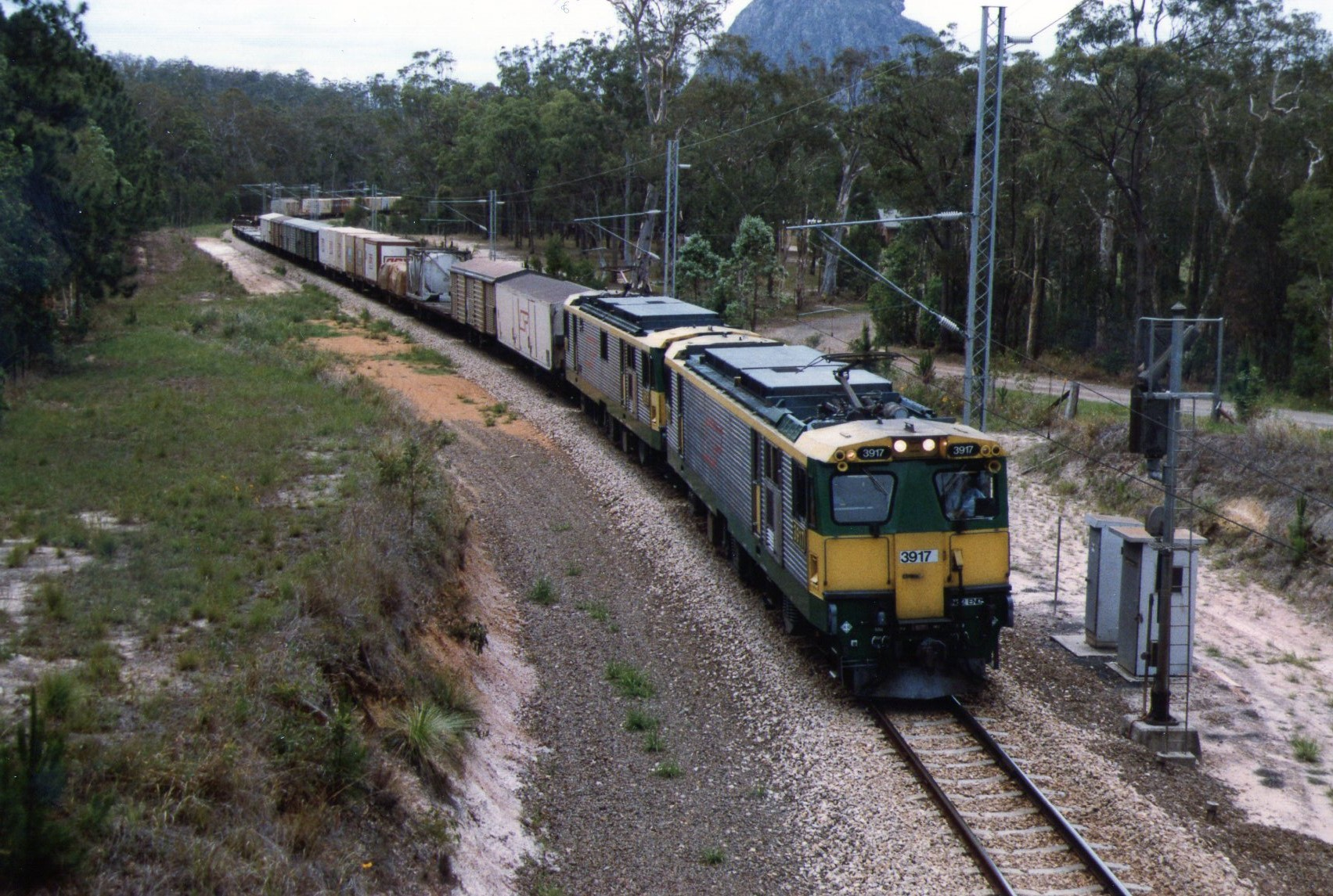
3900 class on the North Coast line in 1989

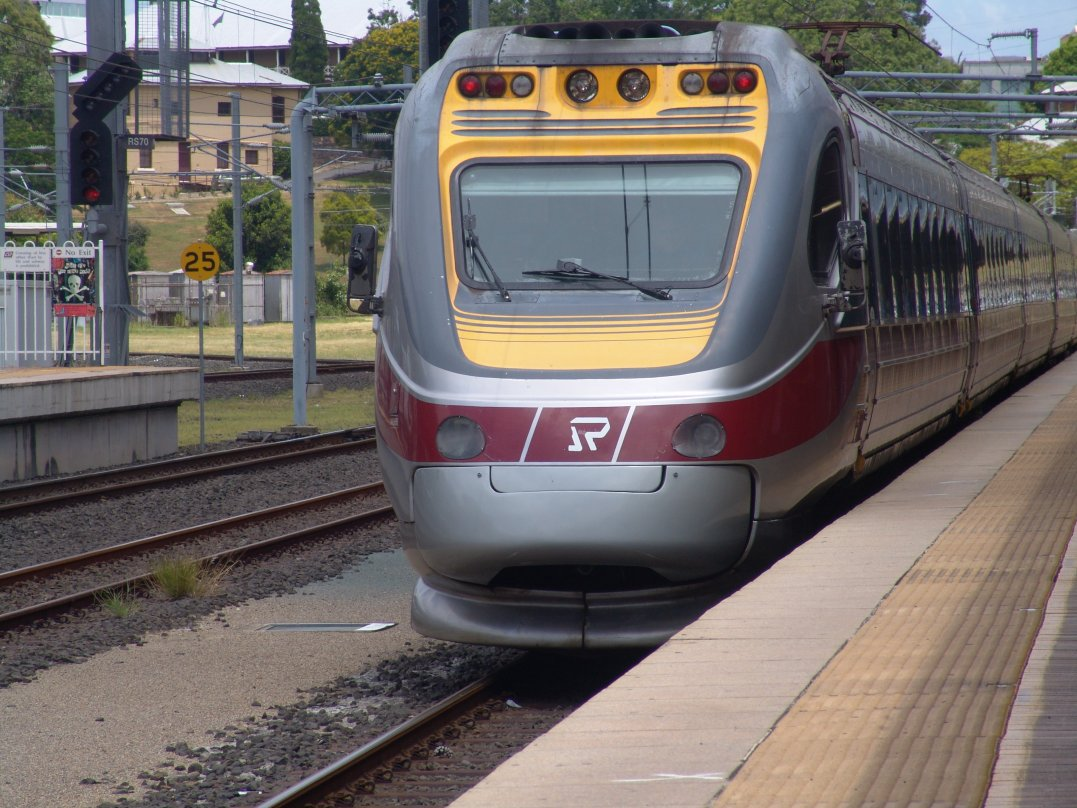
Tilt Train in January 2006

In 1986, the Queensland government announced it had deferred the electrification of the Abbot Point to Newlands line and would instead electrify the Caboolture to Gladstone section (469 km) of the North Coast line connecting the Brisbane and Central Queensland electrified systems.

In addition, four major deviations were undertaken to improve the rail alignment, at Eumundi, a bypass of Gympie, at Maryborough West and at Benaraby. The Eumundi Range deviation eased the grade from 1 in 48 (~2.1%) to 1 in 90 (1.1%) and reduced the minimum curve to 550m radius. The Gympie bypass removed the steepest grade on the entire North Coast line, reducing the grade from 1 in 45 (~2.2%) to 1 in 100 (1%). The Maryborough West project eliminated the need for passenger trains to back into or out of Baddow station. The realigned Benaraby bank crossed the original sharply curved alignment eight times.

Electrification works commenced from Caboolture, and opened to Nambour on 28 April 1988 in time for World Expo 88. The electrification was opened to the new Gympie North station on 4 February 1989, and to Gladstone on 3 July 1989.

A 120 km/h Intercity Express service was introduced from Brisbane to Rockhampton, reducing the journey by three hours, and all express freight trains were electrically hauled. An interesting outcome of this was the decision by QR to purchase larger diesel locomotives for use north of Rockhampton, in order to avoid the need to divide the freight trains there, as there was an imbalance between the maximum load the existing diesels could haul.

A further improvement to the Brisbane to Rockhampton passenger service occurred with the introduction of the Tilt Train in 1998, reducing the journey time by another two hours.

As coal export volumes grew significantly in the early 2000s, the 3900 class locomotives utilised on the North Coast line were transferred to the Blackwater system, though as they had been geared for 100 km/h operation compared to the 80 km/h gearing for the coal locos, they were only considered to be a stop-gap measure. However, although new locomotives have since been put into service on the electrified coal systems, the locomotives have not returned to the line and are in storage. All freight trains to Brisbane are currently diesel hauled, with the Tilt Train being the only electrically powered service between Gympie North and Gladstone.

== See also ==
- Rail electrification in Australia
- Rail transport in Queensland
