= Graceville railway station =

Railway station in Queensland, Australia

Graceville
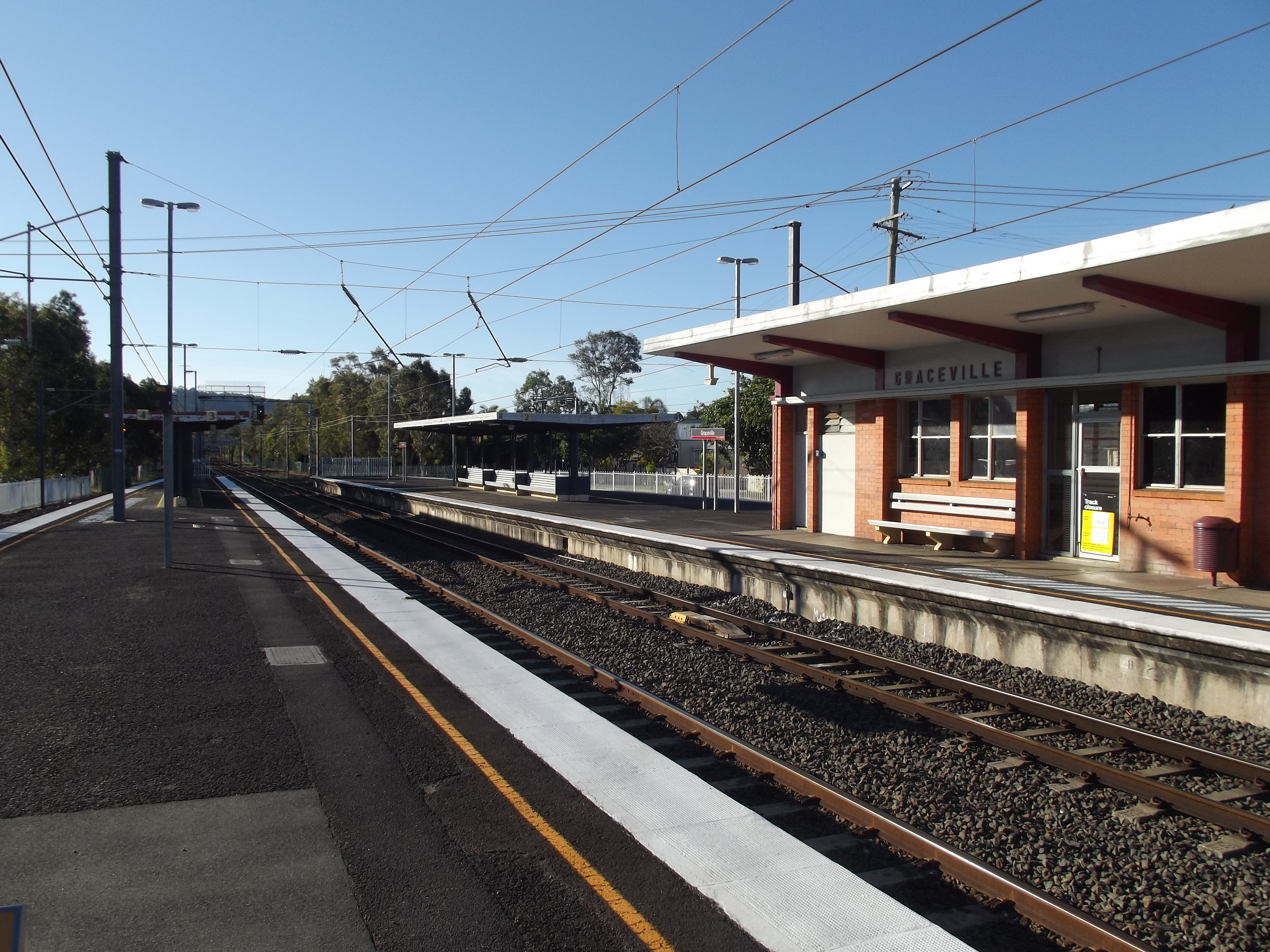
- Northbound view from Platform 2 in August 2012

General information
- Location: Honour Avenue, Graceville
- Coordinates: 27°31′14″S 152°58′33″E
- Owner: Queensland Rail
- Operator: Queensland Rail
- Lines: T1 Ipswich/Rosewood; T2 Springfield
- Distance: 9.47 kilometres from Central
- Platforms: 4 (2 island)

Construction
- Structure type: Ground

Other information
- Status: Staffed
- Station code: 600303 (platform 1); 600304 (platform 2); 600305 (platform 3); 600306 (platform 4)
- Fare zone: Zone 1/2

History
- Opened: 1876; 150 years ago
- Rebuilt: 1959; 67 years ago

Services
Preceding station	Queensland Rail	Following station
Chelmer towards Caboolture via Roma Street	T1 Ipswich/Rosewood line	Sherwood towards Ipswich or Rosewood
Chelmer towards Kippa Ring via Roma Street	T2 Springfield line	Sherwood towards Springfield Central
Location

Graceville is a railway station operated by Queensland Rail on the Ipswich/Rosewood and Springfield lines. It opened in 1876 and serves the Brisbane suburb of Graceville. It is a ground level station, featuring two island platforms with two faces each.

== Services ==
Graceville is served by Citytrain network services operating from Nambour, Caboolture, Kippa-Ring and Bowen Hills to Springfield Central, Ipswich and Rosewood.

== Platforms and services ==
Graceville platform arrangement
Platform	Line	Destination	Notes
1	T1 Ipswich/Rosewood	Ipswich or Rosewood	
1	T2 Springfield	Springfield Central	
2	T1 Ipswich/Rosewood	Roma Street (to Caboolture and Nambour/Gympie North lines)	
2	T2 Springfield	Roma Street (to Kippa-Ring line)	
3	T1 Ipswich/Rosewood	Ipswich or Rosewood	
4	T1 Ipswich/Rosewood	Roma Street (to Caboolture and Nambour/Gympie North lines)	
4	T2 Springfield	Roma Street (to Kippa-Ring line)	

== History ==
Graceville Railway Station is located approximately nine and a half kilometres outbound on the Brisbane-Ipswich line (completed in 1875), one of seven rail lines radiating from the Brisbane central business district to serve the passenger, coal and freight markets of south-east Queensland. The station was established in 1884 to service new residential subdivisions, and had gained its current format by 1958–1959. It services the south-west commuter suburb of Graceville and comprises two island platforms with a butterfly-roofed station building of brick and concrete, four steel and timber platform awnings and a subway system linking the leafy suburb on both sides of the tracks. It was one of a suite of station fit-outs carried out from the early 1950s and into the 1960s in anticipation of the electrification and quadruplication of the rail lines between Nundah and Corinda, and stands out as the first one completed, the most successful resolution of the design themes explored by the Railway Department's architects, and the most intact.

The passing of the Railway Act in 1863 initiated the era of state government owned and operated railways. The first such rail line between Ipswich and Grandchester was built in 1865, being part of a four-stage project that linked to Toowoomba in 1867, Dalby in 1868 and then to Warwick in 1871. In August 1872 Parliament approved the construction the Brisbane railway, but only from Ipswich to Oxley. A survey was required to select the appropriate site for a bridge over the Brisbane River and Oxley Point (now Chelmer) was chosen. On 5 October 1874 the line from Ipswich to Oxley West (now Sherwood) opened. It was extended to Oxley Point early the following year with a ferry transporting passengers across the river until the Albert Bridge, named after Queen Victoria's Consort, was opened on 5 July 1876 allowing a connection to the newly completed Indooroopilly line.

The areas now known as Chelmer, Graceville, Sherwood and Corinda had been part of Boyland's Pocket, a colonial leasehold estate running sheep and cattle. After 1859 the area was subdivided into farms where various crops were grown. Cotton was attempted in the 1860s and sugar cane was grown in the 1860s and 1870s. When the railway was completed to Oxley Point in 1875, the only station between the river and Oxley was Oxley West (Sherwood). The suburban subdivision of Oxley Point began in the building boom of the 1880s and by November 1884 a railway station was operational at Graceville. The Railways Department had asked Samuel Grimes, the MLA for Oxley at the time, to name the station and he suggested one incorporating that of his baby daughter, Grace.

The process of expanding the function of the western line began in 1884. Duplication from Indooroopilly to Oxley was completed in June 1886 and extended to Ipswich by 28 March 1887. A shelter shed was constructed at the Graceville railway station c. 1892. Land adjacent to the station was subdivided and auctioned on 21 November 1895 as Oatlands Estate; it comprised 16 perches (400 m^{2}) allotments to the north of Verney Road on either side of the rail line. In 1897 a contract was let to build overbridges to Sherwood, Chelmer and Graceville Stations.

A further suburban subdivision known as Graceville Estate was offered for sale in 1911 on the eastern side of the station along Verney Road. By January 1916 the level crossing dividing this roadway was eliminated and a new station was constructed in March incorporating overhead bridge access. Graceville continued to grow as a small suburban community through the interwar years. Its recreation reserve, which had been gazetted in 1904, became the site of the Graceville War Memorial, unveiled in 1929 and then became known as Graceville Memorial Park. Electricity was connected in 1920 and a picture theatre opened the following year near to the station on Honour Avenue. A Progress Association formed, and the first Agricultural Show was held in 1921. In 1924, six shops were built by Walter Taylor on Honour Avenue between Verney Road West and Rakeevan Road. He was also a driving force behind the building of the pre-cast concrete Graceville Uniting Church building on Oxley Road in 1930). A state school opened in 1928 and a Catholic school in 1937.

In 1946 a Commission of Enquiry into the Electrification of the Brisbane Suburban Railway System was held and its 1947 report recommended the installation of a similar electric rail system to Sydney and Melbourne. It was argued that electrification would provide a faster, cleaner service and would eventually lead to the settlement of the outer suburbs. In February 1949 approval was given to electrify the Brisbane suburban railway system at an estimated cost £5,888,000. Planning began in February 1950. The project included an upgrade of stations, platforms, the signalling system between Corinda and Northgate and the provision of subways at some stations. Subways were installed to avoid overhead bridges in the vicinity of power lines. The quadruplication of the line from Corinda to Virginia was necessary, with or without the electrification process, because both incorporated important freight lines; Virginia on the main northern line and Corinda on the main western line. The survey between Virginia and Corinda was completed by June 1950. The quadruplication was later extended to Zillmere.

In 1957 Queensland's new Country-Liberal government under Frank Nicklin commissioned consultants Ford, Bacon and Davis to report on the Railway Department's efficiency, facilities and operations. Their recommendations were numerous, and included a total abandonment of electrification in favour of dieselisation, and steam engines were phased out from 1960.

The quadruplication project, however, was continued. Track layouts were produced by the Permanent Way and Works team, Graceville being drawn in 1955. To accommodate the new works at this station, a number of partial resumptions were undertaken in Appel Street, where two houses and the house/shop on the corner of Verney Avenue were moved east on their allotments. Railway plans indicate a very busy shopping precinct along the opposite roadway, Honour Avenue. The new station layout allowed for one wide suburban island platform, on which a new station building and two awnings with integral seating were to be built, and one narrow main-line island platform, which was to house two awnings with more integral seating. The station structures were designed to fit the layouts.

During this time the Queensland Railways architect's office was experimenting with modernist designs for the department's buildings and awnings, being influenced by architectural trends coming from Britain, Europe and the United States. There had been not only an influential pre-war migration of European architects to Queensland – professionals like Karl Langer who occupied a role with the railways from 1939 until 1946 – but also a post-war flow of architects from Britain and Europe who came to Queensland in search of work and brought with them the architectural ideas and training that were driving forward the large task of post-war reconstruction and housing provision being undertaken in their countries of origin.

Under Principal Railway Architect John Sidney Egan, new station designs were prepared for the quadruplication project. An overall concept for the form and structure of the station buildings was established, but the designs were non-standardised, and took account of platform width, which varied from station to station. Architect Jan Kral was responsible for the Graceville and Chelmer designs and signed off on the drawings for Sherwood station as Acting Principal Architect. He was born in Poland and studied at Stuttgart University after the war. He came to Australia in 1950 and was employed by the Queensland Railways the following year, initially as a draftsman, becoming a Senior Architect by 1958. While the designs were all somewhat different, they shared a form derived from a long, thin building, rectangular in plan and made with a regular procession of columns, surmounted by a butterfly roof that cantilevered over each platform side to shelter waiting and alighting rail passengers. A number of standardised plans for Railways Department butterfly-roofed awnings were developed and used between 1949 and 1960, many having been designed by Bevis Thelwall. A common palette of materials including reinforced concrete, steel and exposed brickwork was used. The steel work was all prefabricated at the Northgate workshops. Graceville Station was the first of these station fit-outs to be completed within the quadruplication project between Corinda and Roma Street.

The main building at Graceville had a butterfly roof formed with a reinforced concrete slab lined with bituminous felt and supported on ten pre-cast, reinforced concrete beams that cantilevered off a continuous lintel resting on ten brick piers. A range of materials were used to fill the gaps between the brick frame: including orange-coloured face brick, screened openings, some small sections of render and various aluminium-framed windows. On either side of this building, two wide butterfly-roofed, steel-framed shelters with built-in seating were erected. Each was made up of four sets of steel columns and cantilevered steel tapering I-beams bolted together. The seating, made with timber slats and a steel and timber frame, was placed back-to- back facing each track. Dividing each row of seating were metal ribbed screens. Fitted to each steel column and under each beam were panels framed in steel and filled with glass above the seat level and sheet steel below. The other narrower platform necessitated smaller butterfly-roofed awnings be built there. They were essentially the same construction as the larger ones with only three bays, two of which were given over to seating. The subway system with its street ramps and stairs to both platforms was constructed with reinforced concrete.

In June 1958 the Commissioner reported that new concrete and brick station buildings were under construction at Sherwood, Graceville, Chelmer, Indooroopilly and Auchenflower, and subways were completed or under construction at Graceville, Chelmer, Taringa and Nundah. The Graceville complex of station building, awnings and subway, and enlarged and raised platforms at a cost of £16,686, was the first of these new stations to open in mid-1959. Chelmer, with an identical layout of one building and four awnings, all butterfly-roofed, opened shortly afterwards. Milton, also drawn by Jan Kral was built in 1960.

At the time of its completion in mid-1959, Graceville Station featured in a number of local newspaper articles where it was described as one of the most modern in Australia. The Commissioner also chose to feature a photograph of it in his annual report. Architect John Egan published an article on the new station designs in the Architecture in Australia journal in June 1961.

All the new station buildings constructed in the 1950s and early 1960s for the quadruplication and electrification projects employed a Modernist idiom, but only the platform stations at Graceville (1959) and Chelmer (1959) on the Corinda line, and at Nundah (1960) and Eagle Junction (1963) on the northern line, were designed with butterfly roofs. Similarly designed, but with flat roof profiles were Sherwood (1960), Indooroopilly (late 1950s), Toowong (c. 1960) and Milton (1960). Taringa (mid-1950s), Toombul (c. 1960) and Wooloowin (1960) were butterfly-roofed overhead stations; Corinda (1960) was a flat-roofed overhead station; and Auchenflower (c. 1960) was a skillion-roofed overhead station. A standard plan was drawn up for Nundah and Graceville in 1955, but only Graceville and Chelmer were later constructed with the same pitch to their butterfly roofs. Nundah was given a flatter roof made with steel framing rather than reinforced concrete.

In September 1960, the quadruplication project was suspended on the northern line. Work continued between Roma Street and Corinda as the signalling contract had been already let. The northern line stations of Nundah and Toombul were constructed within this time frame, and Eagle Junction shortly after. The quadruplicated Corinda to Roma Street line opened on 1 December 1963, providing greater flexibility in the provision of peak hour suburban services and allowing the passage of long distance goods and livestock trains which travelled through these suburban networks to the main western line.

During the 1960s a number of rail lines were decommissioned as government funds were geared towards the provision of better roads, but by the end of that decade it was clear that public transport also needed to be upgraded. A report delivered in 1970 recommended the electrification of the suburban railway network, the construction of the Merivale Street Bridge and a range of operational improvements, including the creation of a separate public transport authority. By 8 May 1979 the overhead lines between Corinda and Roma Street were switched on as part of the electrification project between Darra and Ferny Grove, which was the first section of the suburban network to be completed.

Alterations to the various elements of Graceville railway station have been minimal since its completion in 1959. Changes to the building include carpeting of the office floor, the addition of safety screens to the openings above the stairway and further enclosure of what was the telephone booth at the southern end. The steel-framed awnings originally had ribbed panels dividing the two sides of the timber seating, which have now been removed, as have those panels which divided the various seating bays. Graceville, Chelmer and Sherwood stations were repainted in 1998 with only the former being painted the corporate Queensland Rail colours of maroon and grey. Various ticket machines, a telephone and other signs have been added.

Of the thirteen stations designed and built in the 1950s and early 1960s as part of the original Queensland Railways electrification and quadruplication projects, Graceville, which remains substantially intact, best exemplifies the Modernist-influenced design concepts employed. It is the most intact of the four butterfly-roofed platform stations, with Chelmer having been altered somewhat, and Eagle Junction and Nundah altered substantially. Of the four flat-roofed platform stations Sherwood has been altered partially, Milton has been altered substantially, and Indooroopilly and Toowong have been rebuilt. Of the five over-head stations, Auchenflower and Taringa remain the more intact, Corinda and Wooloowin have been altered substantially, and Toombul has been rebuilt.

== Description ==
Graceville Railway Station is situated between Chelmer and Sherwood stations on the Brisbane-Ipswich line, just over eight and a half kilometres on from Roma Street passenger station. It comprises two island platforms with dimpled concrete coping and six structures: a brick and concrete station building, four steel-framed platform awnings and a subway system accessed via ramps leading off both Honour Avenue and Appel Street. From Richlands Park in the north to Sherwood Road in the south, these two roadways run parallel to the generally north-west to south-east oriented rail corridor, which contains four tracks. The local terrain is flat, with the Brisbane River only about half a kilometre to the west and just over one kilometre distant to the east. The adjacent intersections are with Rakeevan Road and Verney Road West where there is a small shopping precinct, and Connors Street and Verney Road East, which is residential except for a timber shop building.

The station building, completed in 1959, sits on the easternmost island platform serving tracks 1 and 2, about halfway between each platform end. A long, thin rectangle in plan, oriented with the platform and tracks, the building has a butterfly roof formed with a reinforced concrete slab and supported on pre-cast, reinforced concrete beams which cantilever off a deep, continuous white-painted lintel that itself rests on ten brick piers, almost two and a half metres tall. The roof and its integral beams cantilever by approximately two metres to provide shelter to the platform along each track. The edges of the roof slab are lined with fibrous cement boarding, which is not original. The ten brick piers and associated maroon-painted concrete beams occur at about three and a half metre intervals with a range of materials filling the gaps in the north-eastern and south-western facades: from orange-coloured face brick to screened openings, some small sections of render at each end, to various aluminium-framed windows and doors. On the north-western facade are two banks of aluminium-framed louvre windows with sills approximately two metres off the ground. "GRACEVILLE" is lettered in maroon-painted timber across the white-painted lintel above these windows. This lettering also features on two similar bulkheads on the south-western facade, as well as at the south-eastern end. This last facade has more depth with the walls stepping back from each corner leaving brick columns. In the centre is a single door to a small room facing the trains coming from the south.

The wide stairs leading from the subway land in the southern third of the building at a ticket hall and waiting area, which is open on both sides. A painted steel mid-rail runs the length of these stairs. Opposite the stair void the gaps between the piers are filled with screens made with a metal frame and grill panel bolted to the brick surrounds and resting on low brick walls. The internal faces of the piers are rendered and painted. The ticket windows are directly opposite the stair landing. Only the western one is currently in use, the other now hidden behind a freestanding automatic ticket machine. A number of timetable wall-boxes line the available wall space, one being an early timber example. One of the original chrome-plated ticket rails in front of the operating ticket window remains. The floor is lined with a chequered pattern of black and white terrazzo tiles, while the ceiling is made with fibrous cement sheeting. A stainless steel downpipe marks the top of the stairs and the endpoint of the middle handrail. There were four downpipes in the original design, one next to what had been the telephone box on the south-eastern facade, another between the office and store and another between the toilet and waiting area. How many still exist is unknown as three were enclosed in various walls along the centreline of the building and cannot be viewed. It is likely that some if not all remain.

To the north of the ticket hall is an office and service room for the station manager. Parts of the timber framing to the ticket windows are visible on its south-eastern wall. The floors are carpeted and the walls and ceiling are lined with fibrous cement sheeting. The windows are double-hung sashes with interior sills made with a terrazzo different from that on the floor in the ticket hall. Adjacent to these rooms to the north is the semi-enclosed waiting area. Its floor has a terrazzo tile pattern to match that in the ticket hall. Its southern wall is face brick, while the remainder are plastered. On each side wall, there are two banks of the same double-hung sashes as in the office, with interior terrazzo sills. There is also some solid timber shelving here. The seating, which lines three walls, is made with timber slats and framing on shaped concrete legs. Two timber-framed and screen-infill doors, with matching surrounds provide entry from each side of the platform. At the northernmost end of the building are the toilets, which consist of two toilet cubicles and wash areas accessed by timber doors on the south-western and north-eastern sides. Metal framed louvres open off all three exterior walls at two metre sill height. Approximately one and a half metres from the north- eastern face of the building stands a cast iron drinking fountain. A number of timber and concrete seats, the same as those used in the northern waiting room, sit against the building on its long facades.

Set off from the main building by approximately 13 metres (43 ft) to the north-west and south-east are two wide butterfly-roofed, steel-framed shelters with built-in seating that faces both tracks. Four steel T-shaped components support steel perforated purlins, which in turn support the corrugated metal roof sheeting. The former divide the seating lengths. Set about four and a half metres apart, they are made with two cantilevered, tapering I-beams bolted to a rectangular hollow steel column (made with two C-sections welded together) which is founded in a concrete upstand. A perpendicular upstand runs the length of the shelter along the midline. Welded to the steel columns and beams are lighter steel frames. The infill panels of glass have been removed, as have some of the steel ones, while others are corroded. The seating is made with painted timber slats supported on timber studs and some steel framing. The downpipes taking water from the box gutter continue the rhythm of the columns, piercing the timber caps that join the two sides of seating at the centre of each gap.

Two more narrower butterfly-roofed, steel-framed shelters are situated on the island platform serving tracks 3 and 4 to the west and Honour Avenue. They are of similar construction but with two seating bays at each end and a central section clad with a ribbed sheeting product that closely resembles the zincanneal that featured prominently in the standard design for these awnings. Surrounding the stairway opening in this platform is some metal railings bolted to a concrete upstand.

The subway connects Honour Avenue with Appel Street, is approximately three metres wide and formed with reinforced concrete retaining walls, ceiling and floor slabs. The walls are lined from the concrete floor to approximately two metres with ceramic tiles, dark green bands at the top and bottom and white inside. A number of heavy steel grille covers mark the drainage system. To the west, two ramps going in opposite directions take pedestrians to Honour Avenue. To the east there is one ramp. All are made with reinforced concrete retaining walls and slabs. Where the subway walls join the ramp walls the corners are rounded. There are uncovered drains made in each side of the concrete ramp slabs. Lining the tops of the ramp walls are some painted metal railings, the same as those around the stairway opening on the platform serving tracks 3 and 4.

The tracks, overhead power traction equipment, and railways signalling system within the heritage boundary at Graceville Railway Station are not considered to be of cultural heritage significance.
