= Sherwood railway station, Brisbane =

Railway station in Queensland, Australia

Sherwood
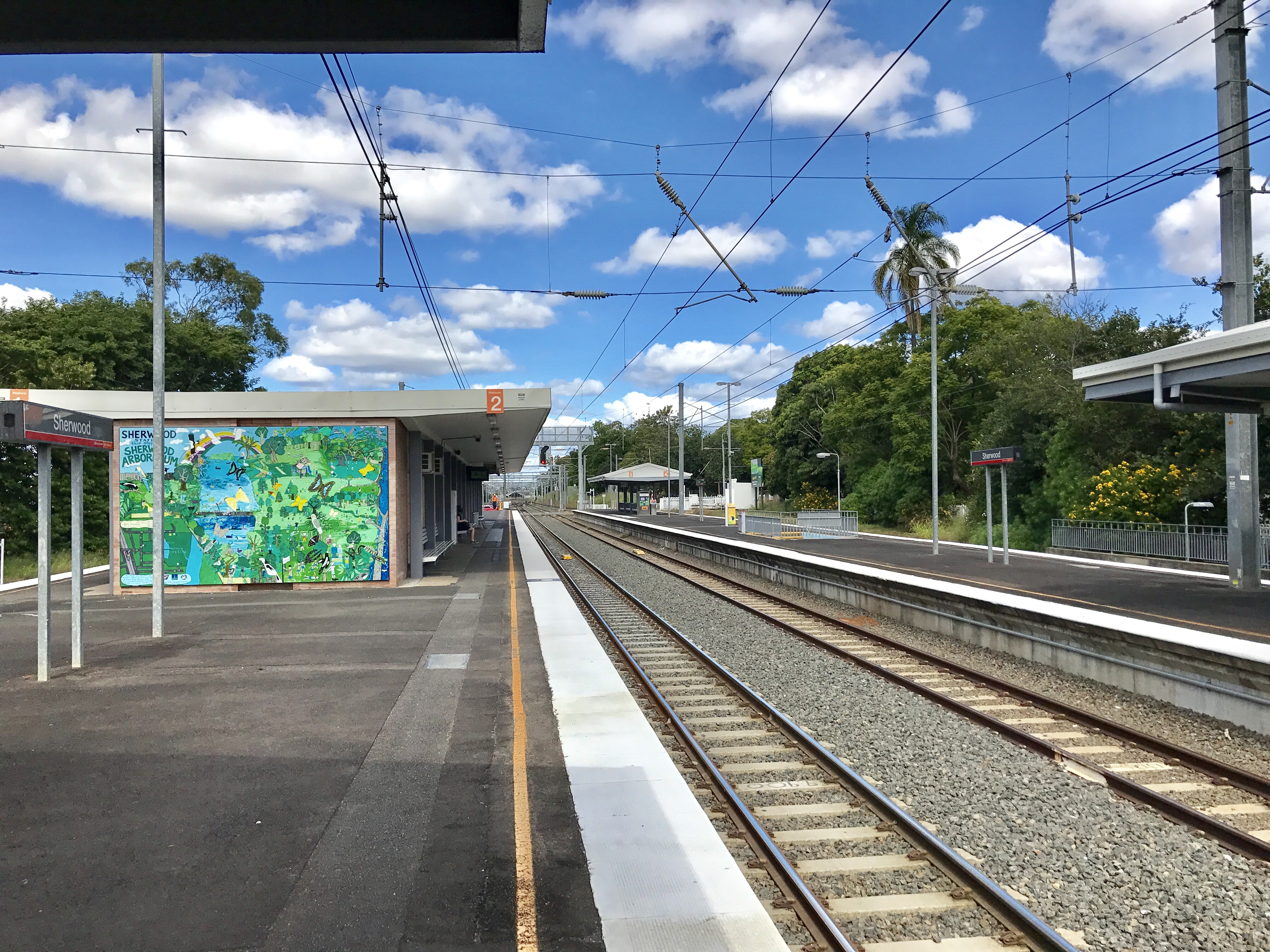
- Southbound view from Platform 2 in May 2017

General information
- Location: Honour Avenue, Sherwood
- Coordinates: 27°31′52″S 152°58′46″E
- Owner: Queensland Rail
- Operator: Queensland Rail
- Lines: T1 Ipswich/Rosewood; T2 Springfield
- Distance: 10.69 kilometres from Central
- Platforms: 4 (2 island)

Construction
- Structure type: Ground

Other information
- Status: Staffed
- Station code: 600309 (platform 1); 600310 (platform 2); 600311 (platform 3); 600312 (platform 4)
- Fare zone: Zone 2
- Website: Queensland Rail

History
- Opened: 5 October 1874; 151 years ago
- Rebuilt: 1960; 66 years ago

Services
Preceding station	Queensland Rail	Following station
Graceville towards Caboolture via Roma Street	T1 Ipswich/Rosewood line	Corinda towards Ipswich or Rosewood
Graceville towards Kippa Ring via Roma Street	T2 Springfield line	Corinda towards Springfield Central
Location

Sherwood is a railway station operated by Queensland Rail on the Ipswich/Rosewood and Springfield lines. It opened in 1874 and serves the Brisbane suburb of Sherwood. It is a ground level station, featuring two island platforms with two faces each.

== History ==
Sherwood station opened on 5 October 1874 as Oxley West as the interim terminus of the Main line from Ipswich. It was extended to Oxley Point on 4 February 1875. It was renamed to Sherwood in May 1878.

The line through Indooroopilly was duplicated in June 1886. The station was rebuilt in 1960 as part of the quadruplication of the line.

== Services ==
Sherwood is served by Citytrain network services operating from Nambour, Caboolture, Kippa-Ring and Bowen Hills to Springfield Central, Ipswich and Rosewood.

== Platforms and services ==
Sherwood platform arrangement
Platform	Line	Destination	Notes
1	T1 Ipswich/Rosewood	Ipswich or Rosewood	
1	T2 Springfield	Springfield Central	
2	T1 Ipswich/Rosewood	Roma Street (to Caboolture and Nambour/Gympie North lines)	
2	T2 Springfield	Roma Street (to Kippa-Ring line)	
3	T1 Ipswich/Rosewood	Ipswich or Rosewood	
4	T1 Ipswich/Rosewood	Roma Street (to Caboolture and Nambour/Gympie North lines)	
4	T2 Springfield	Roma Street (to Kippa-Ring line)	
