= 4077 =

4077 may refer to:

- 4077, a standard XNOR gate CMOS integrated circuit
- 4077th, a fictional U.S. Army hospital in the show M*A*S*H
- 4077, the shared postcode for a number of places including
  - Richlands, Queensland, Australia
  - Inala, Queensland, Australia
- 4077, the postcode for Tolaga Bay, Gisborne Region, New Zealand

== See also ==
- 4000 (number)
- 5th millennium
