= Springfield Line =

The Springfield line is an interurban commuter railway line in South East Queensland, Australia. Springfield Line may also refer to:

- New Haven-Springfield Line, an intercity rail line in Connecticut and Massachusetts
- Springfield Avenue Line (Newark), a former streetcar route in New Jersey
- Springfield Route, a never-built Washington Metrorail line to Backlick Road, branching off the Blue Line at Van Dorn Street
