= Richlands railway station =

Railway station in Queensland, Australia

Richlands
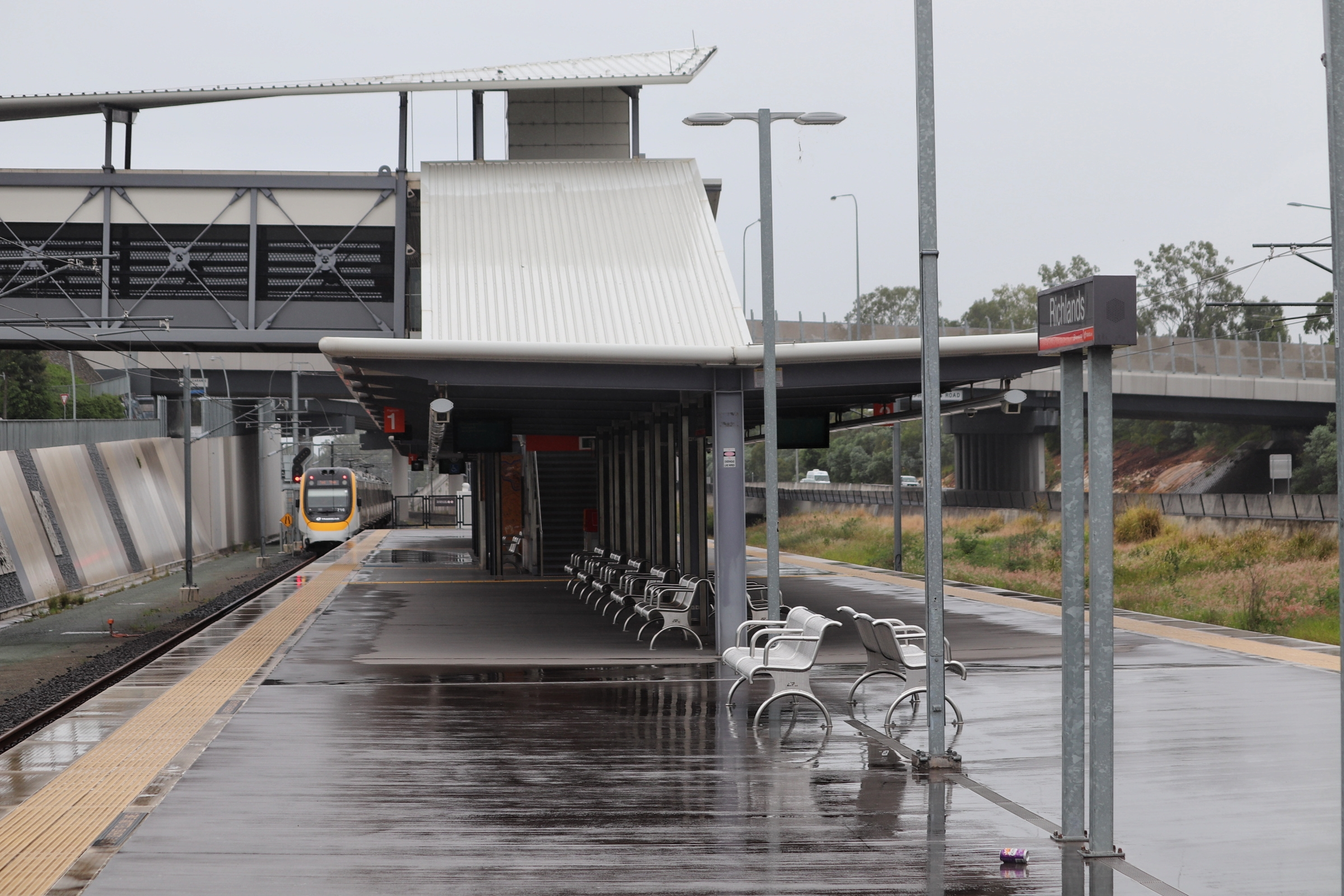
- View of Richlands station in March 2018

General information
- Location: Progress Road, Richlands
- Coordinates: 27.596442°S 152.946558°E
- Owner: Queensland Rail
- Operator: Queensland Rail
- Line: T2 Springfield
- Platforms: 2 (1 island)
- Tracks: 2

Construction
- Structure type: Ground
- Parking: 650 bays
- Accessible: Yes

Other information
- Status: Staffed
- Station code: 600325 (Platform 1); 600326 (Platform 2)
- Fare zone: Zone 2
- Website: Queensland Rail

History
- Opened: 17 January 2011; 15 years ago

Services
Preceding station	Queensland Rail	Following station
Darra towards Kippa Ring via Roma Street	T2 Springfield line	Springfield towards Springfield Central
Location

Richlands is a railway station operated by Queensland Rail on the Springfield line. It opened in 2011 and serves the Brisbane suburb of Richlands. It is a ground level station, featuring one island platform with two faces.

== History ==
Construction started on the station on 1 July 2008. The planning included about 650 car parks, a bus interchange, bicycle lockers and a drop-off area.

The station was due to open on 23 January 2011 with no services due to scheduled maintenance works on the Ipswich line, but due to the Queensland floods the opening was brought forward to 17 January 2011 in order to assist with the recovery efforts. On 2 December 2013, the line was extended to Springfield Central.

The station multi-storey car park has 650 car parking spaces for vehicles.

== Platforms and services ==
Richlands platform arrangement
Platform	Line	Destination	Notes
1	T2 Springfield	Springfield Central	
2	T2 Springfield	Roma Street (to Kippa-Ring line)	

== Transport links ==
Transport for Brisbane operate two bus routes from Richlands station:

- 101: Oxley station to Forest Lake via Inala
- 460: City to Heathwood via Forest Lake Shops
