= Springfield railway station, Ipswich =

Railway station in Queensland, Australia

Springfield
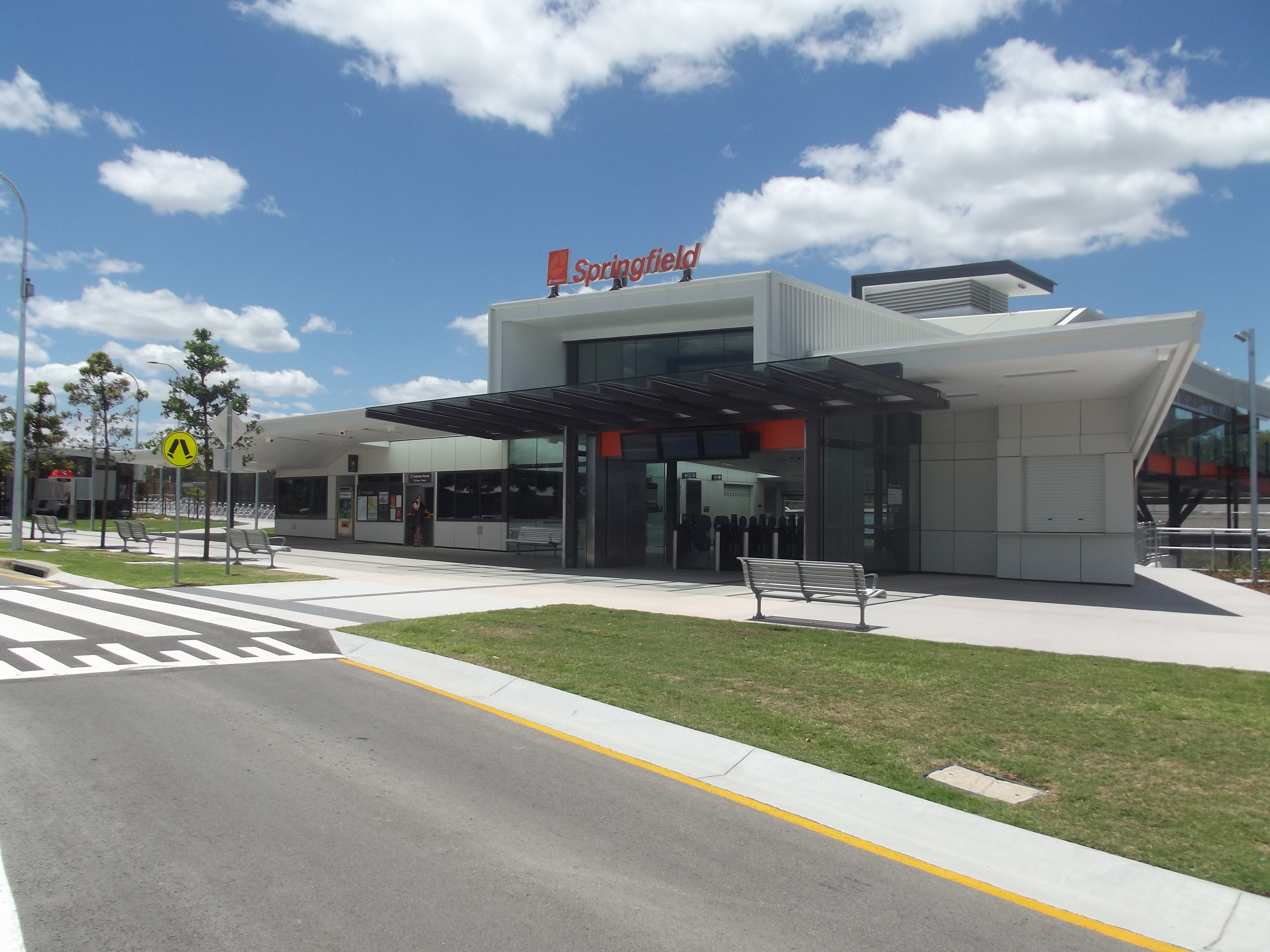
- Station front in December 2013

General information
- Location: Nev Smith Drive, Springfield
- Coordinates: 27°39′36″S 152°55′19″E
- Owner: Queensland Rail
- Operator: Queensland Rail
- Line: T2 Springfield Central
- Platforms: 2 (1 island)
- Tracks: 2

Construction
- Structure type: Below ground
- Depth: 3 m (9.8 ft)
- Parking: 200 bays
- Cycle facilities: 100
- Accessible: Yes

Other information
- Station code: 600088 (platform 1); 600087 (platform 2)
- Fare zone: Zone 3
- Website: Queensland Rail

History
- Opened: 2 December 2013; 12 years ago

Services
Preceding station	Queensland Rail	Following station
Richlands towards Kippa-Ring	Springfield Central line	Springfield Central Terminus
Location

Springfield is a railway station operated by Queensland Rail on the Springfield line. It opened in 2013 and serves the Ipswich suburb of Springfield. It is a below ground station, featuring one island platform with two faces.

== History ==
Springfield station opened on 2 December 2013 when the Springfield line was extended from Richlands to Springfield Central. Robert Dow rb

== Platforms and services ==
Springfield platform arrangement
Platform	Line	Destination	Notes
1	T2 Springfield Central	Springfield Central	
2	T2 Springfield Central	Roma Street (to Kippa-Ring line)	
