= Oxley railway station =

Railway station in Queensland, Australia

Oxley
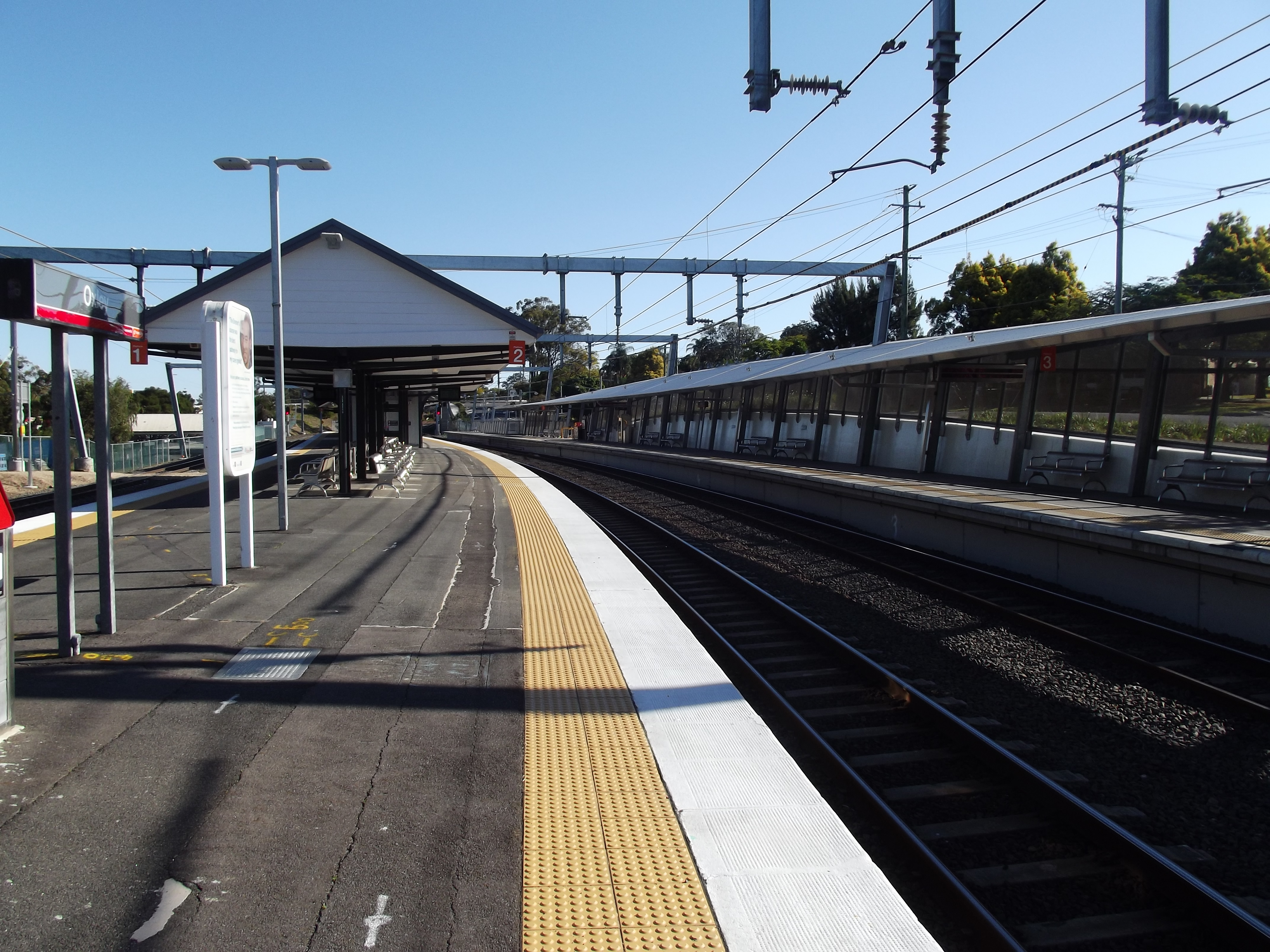
- Southbound view from Platform 2 in September 2012

General information
- Location: Ardoyne Road, Oxley
- Coordinates: 27°33′08″S 152°58′25″E
- Elevation: 20 m (66 ft)
- Owner: Queensland Rail
- Operator: Queensland Rail
- Lines: T1 Ipswich/Rosewood; T2 Springfield Central
- Distance: 13.28 kilometres from Central
- Platforms: 3 (1 side, 1 island)
- Tracks: 4 (one has no platform)

Construction
- Structure type: Ground
- Parking: 191 bays
- Accessible: Yes

Other information
- Status: Staffed
- Station code: 600318 (platform 1); 600319 (platform 2); 600320 (platform 3)
- Fare zone: Zone 2
- Website: Queensland Rail; TransLink travel information

History
- Opened: 1874; 152 years ago

Services
Preceding station	Queensland Rail	Following station
Corinda towards Caboolture via Roma Street	T1 Ipswich/Rosewood line	Darra towards Ipswich or Rosewood
Corinda towards Kippa Ring via Roma Street	T2 Springfield Central line	Darra towards Springfield Central
Location

Oxley is a railway station operated by Queensland Rail on the Ipswich/Rosewood and Springfield lines. It opened in 1874 and serves the Brisbane suburb of Oxley. It is a ground level station, featuring one island platform with two faces and one side platform.

== History ==
Oxley station was first opened in 1874. During the 1890s, a brick structure was built that still survives today.

In 2010, as part of the quadruplication of the Main line from Corinda to Darra to accommodate Springfield line services, a pair of tracks were built on either side of the existing two, with the western track receiving a new platform.

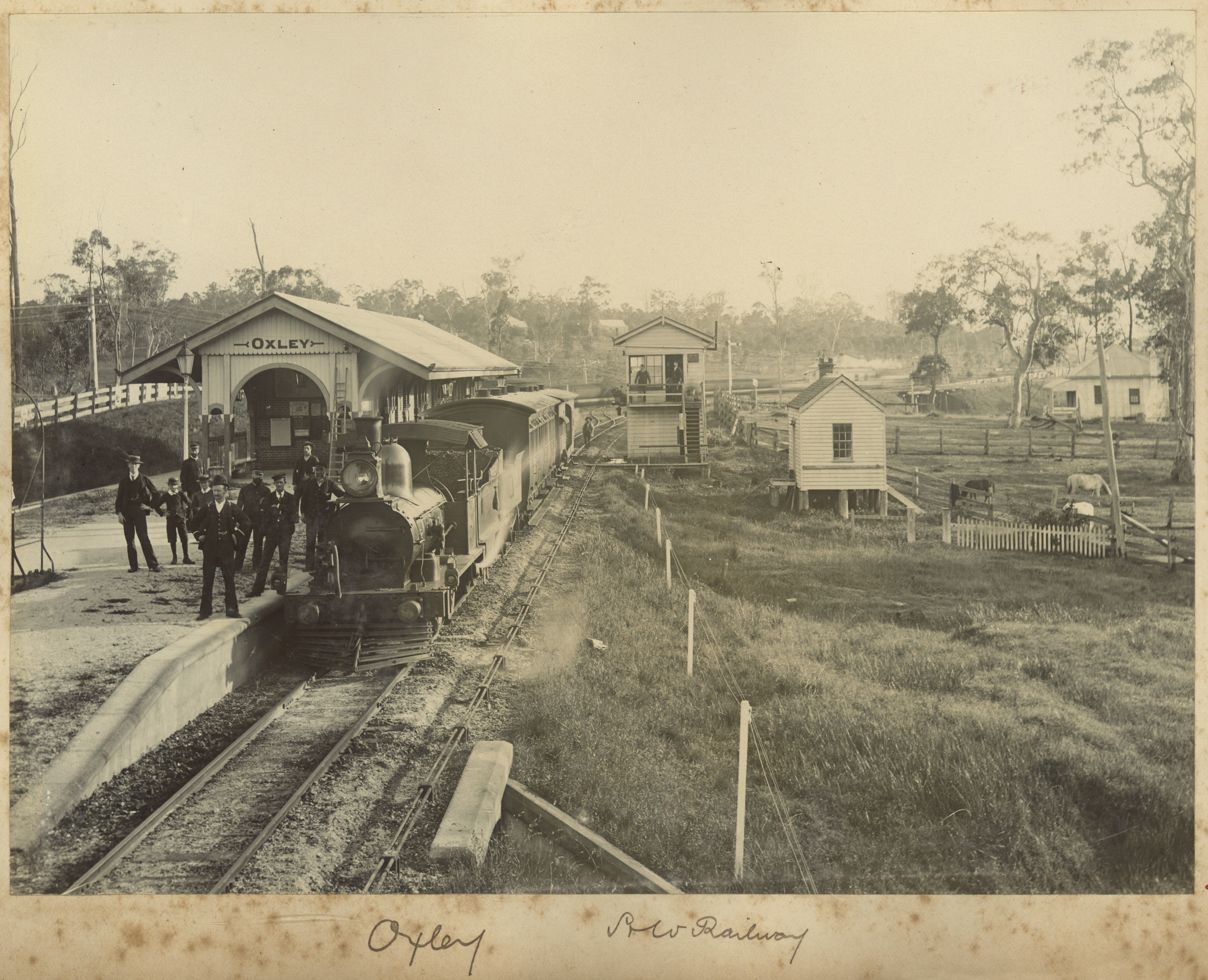
Oxley Railway Station ca. 1890

== Services ==
Oxley is served by Citytrain network services operating from Nambour, Caboolture, Kippa-Ring and Bowen Hills to Springfield Central, Ipswich and Rosewood.

== Platforms and services ==
Oxley platform arrangement
Platform	Line	Destination	Notes
1	T1 Ipswich/Rosewood	Ipswich or Rosewood	
1	T2 Springfield Central	Springfield Central	
2	T1 Ipswich/Rosewood	Roma Street (to Caboolture and Nambour/Gympie North lines)	
2	T2 Springfield Central	Roma Street (to Kippa-Ring line)	
3	T1 Ipswich/Rosewood	Roma Street (to Caboolture and Nambour/Gympie North lines)	
