= Corinda railway station =

Railway station in Queensland, Australia

Corinda
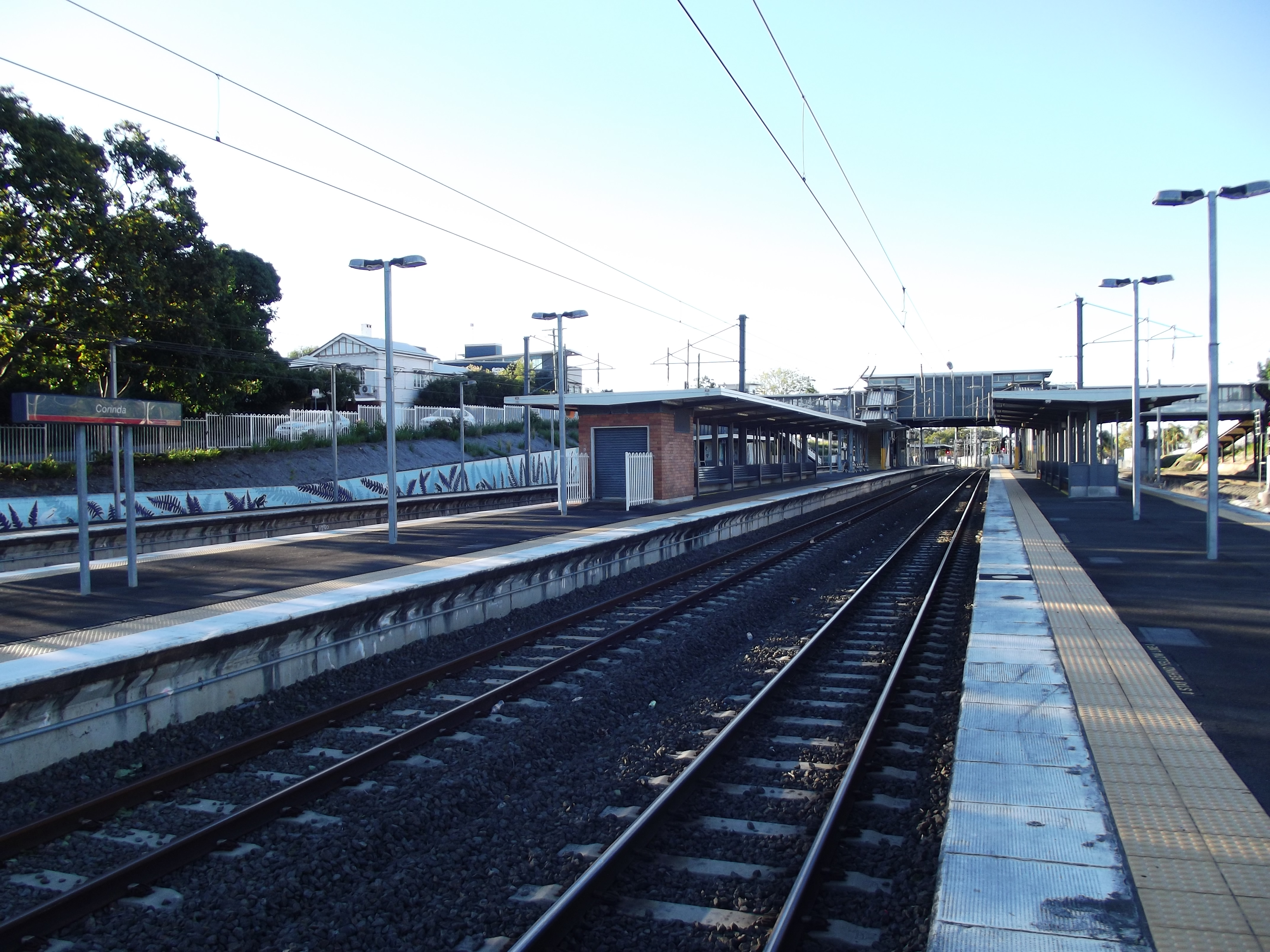
- Northbound view from Platform 2 in August 2012

General information
- Location: Corner Watt & Ruthven Streets, Corinda
- Coordinates: 27°32′20″S 152°58′48″E
- Elevation: 25 m (82 ft)
- Owner: Queensland Rail
- Operator: Queensland Rail
- Lines: T1 Ipswich/Rosewood; T2 Springfield Central; Westlander
- Distance: 11.58 kilometres from Central
- Platforms: 5 (1 side, 2 island)
- Tracks: 5

Construction
- Structure type: Ground
- Parking: 94
- Accessible: Yes

Other information
- Status: Staffed
- Station code: 600313 (platform 1); 600314 (platform 2); 600315 (platform 3); 600316 (platform 4); 600317 (platform 5)
- Fare zone: Zone 2
- Website: Queensland Rail; TransLink travel information

History
- Opened: 1875; 151 years ago
- Former names: South Brisbane Junction

Services
Preceding station	Queensland Rail	Following station
Sherwood towards Caboolture via Roma Street	T1 Ipswich/Rosewood line	Oxley towards Ipswich or Rosewood
Sherwood towards Kippa Ring via Roma Street	T2 Springfield Central line	Oxley towards Springfield Central
Brisbane Terminus	The Westlander	Ipswich towards Charleville
Former services
Tennyson towards Bowen Hills	Corinda via South Brisbane line	Terminus
Location

Corinda is a railway station operated by Queensland Rail on the Ipswich/Rosewood and Springfield lines. It opened in 1875 and serves the Brisbane suburb of Corinda. It is a ground level station, featuring two island platforms with two faces each and one side platform.

== History ==
Corinda station opened in 1875 as South Brisbane Junction, being renamed Corinda in 1888. In 1884, a branch line was built from Corinda to the South Brisbane wharves. The branch line is now known as the Corinda-Yeerongpilly line.

The station was rebuilt in 1960 as part of the quadruplication of the line from Roma Street. In 2010, the quadruplication was extended to Darra as part of the construction of the Springfield line.

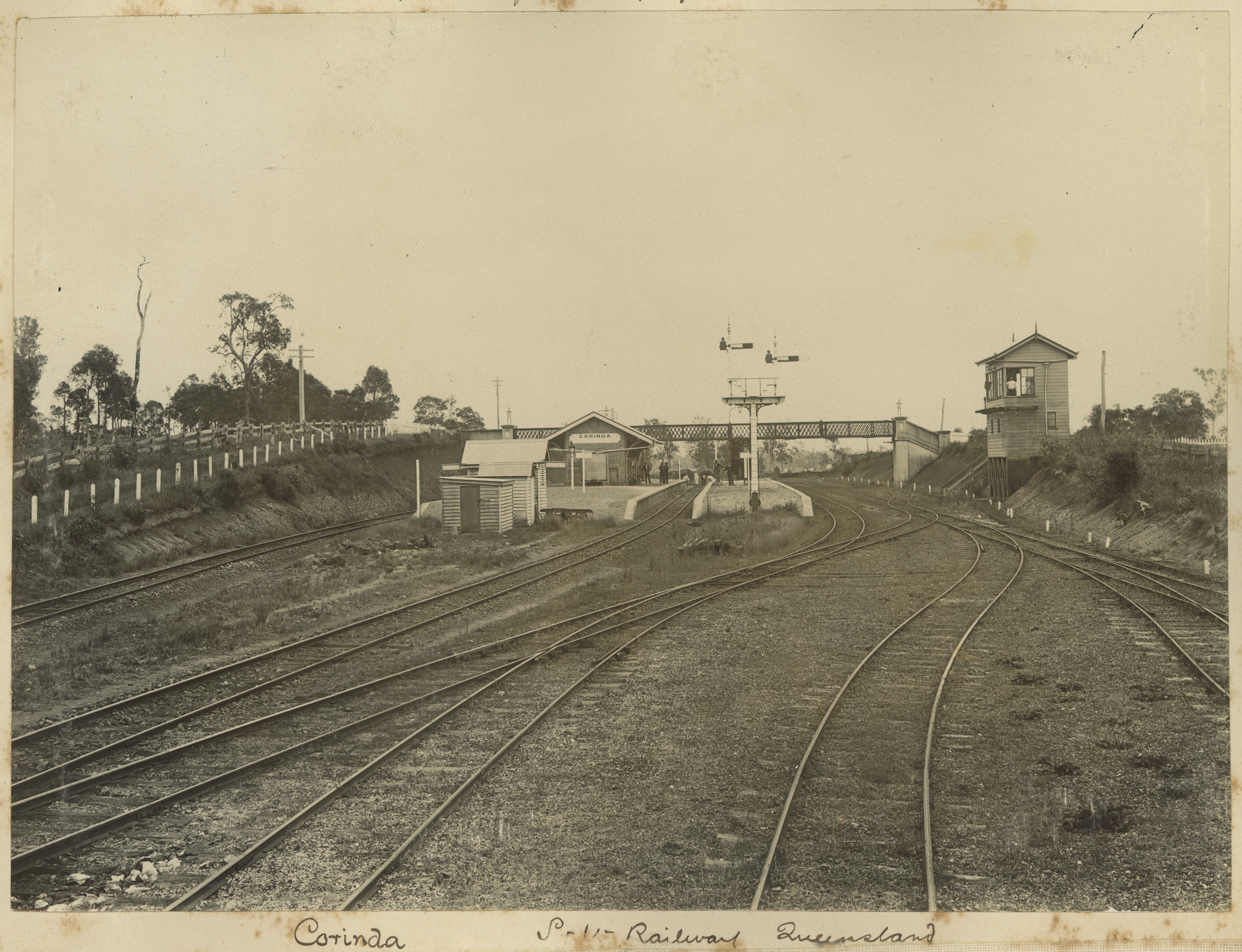
View of the Corinda Railway Station and the railway bridge, ca.1890

== Services ==
Corinda is served by Citytrain network services operating from Nambour, Caboolture, Kippa-Ring and Bowen Hills to Springfield Central, Ipswich and Rosewood.

During peak hours, trains ran between Central and Corinda via Tennyson, Yeerongpilly and the Corinda-Yeerongpilly line until replaced by Transport for Brisbane's route 104 in June 2011.

Corinda is also served by Queensland Rail Travel's twice weekly Westlander service travelling between Brisbane and Charleville.

== Platforms and services ==
Corinda platform arrangement
Platform	Line	Destination	Notes
1			
2	T1 Ipswich/Rosewood	Ipswich or Rosewood	
2	T2 Springfield Central	Springfield Central	
3			
4	T1 Ipswich/Rosewood	Roma Street (to Caboolture and Nambour/Gympie North lines)	
4	T2 Springfield Central	Roma Street (to Kippa-Ring line)	
5	T1 Ipswich/Rosewood	Roma Street (to Caboolture and Nambour/Gympie North lines)	

== Transport links ==
Corinda station is served by Transport for Brisbane's bus route 104 to Princess Alexandra Hospital.
