= Indooroopilly railway station =

Railway station in Queensland, Australia

Indooroopilly
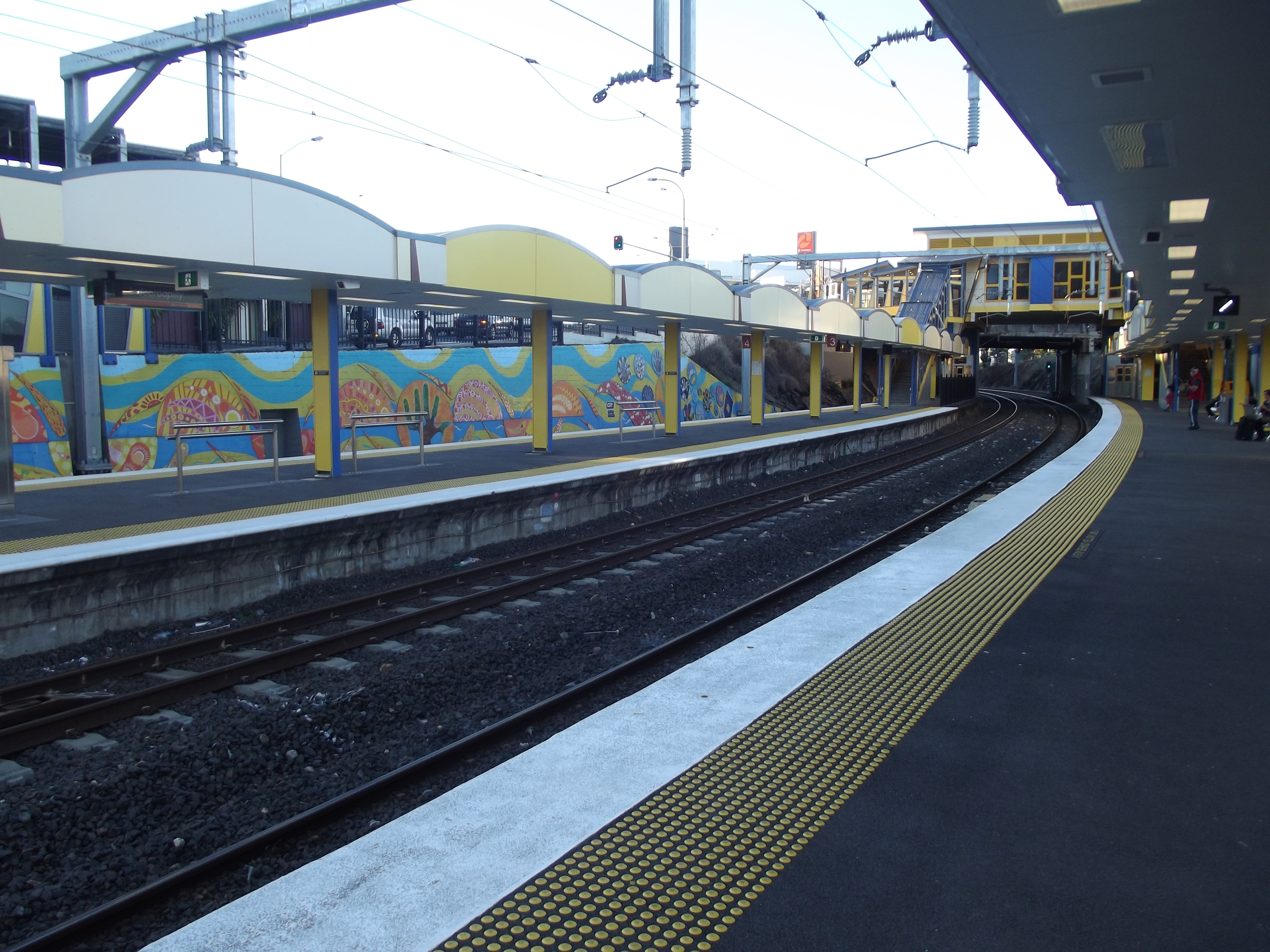
- Northbound view from Platform 2 in June 2012

General information
- Location: Railway Avenue, Indooroopilly
- Coordinates: 27°30′10″S 152°58′34″E
- Owner: Queensland Rail
- Operator: Queensland Rail
- Lines: T1 Ipswich/Rosewood; T2 Springfield
- Distance: 7.38 kilometres from Central
- Platforms: 4 (2 island)

Construction
- Structure type: Ground
- Accessible: Yes

Other information
- Status: Staffed
- Station code: 600295 (platform 1); 600296 (platform 2); 600297 (platform 3); 600298 (platform 4)
- Fare zone: Zone 1
- Website: Queensland Rail

History
- Opened: 14 June 1875; 151 years ago
- Rebuilt: 1960; 66 years ago, 2009; 17 years ago
- Former names: Witton

Services
Preceding station	Queensland Rail	Following station
Taringa towards Caboolture via Roma Street	T1 Ipswich/Rosewood line	Chelmer towards Ipswich or Rosewood
Taringa towards Kippa Ring via Roma Street	T2 Springfield line	Chelmer towards Springfield Central
Location

Indooroopilly is a railway station operated by Queensland Rail on the Ipswich/Rosewood and Springfield lines. It opened in 1875 and serves the Brisbane suburb of Indooroopilly. It is a ground level station, featuring two island platforms with two faces each.

== History ==
Indooroopilly station opened on 14 June 1875 as Witton. It was renamed Indooroopilly in 1879. The line through Indooroopilly was duplicated in June 1886.

The station was rebuilt in 1960 as part of the quadruplication of the line. In July 2007, a project began to upgrade the station. It was completed in January 2009.

== Services ==
Indooroopilly is served by Citytrain network services operating from Nambour, Caboolture, Kippa-Ring and Bowen Hills to Springfield Central, Ipswich and Rosewood.

== Platforms and services ==
Indooroopilly platform arrangement
Platform	Line	Destination	Notes
1	T1 Ipswich/Rosewood	Ipswich or Rosewood	
1	T2 Springfield	Springfield Central	
2	T1 Ipswich/Rosewood	Roma Street (to Caboolture and Nambour/Gympie North lines)	
2	T2 Springfield	Roma Street (to Kippa-Ring line)	
3	T1 Ipswich/Rosewood	Ipswich or Rosewood	
4	T1 Ipswich/Rosewood	Roma Street (to Caboolture and Nambour/Gympie North lines)	
4	T2 Springfield	Roma Street (to Kippa-Ring line)	
