= Darra railway station =

Railway station in Queensland, Australia

Darra
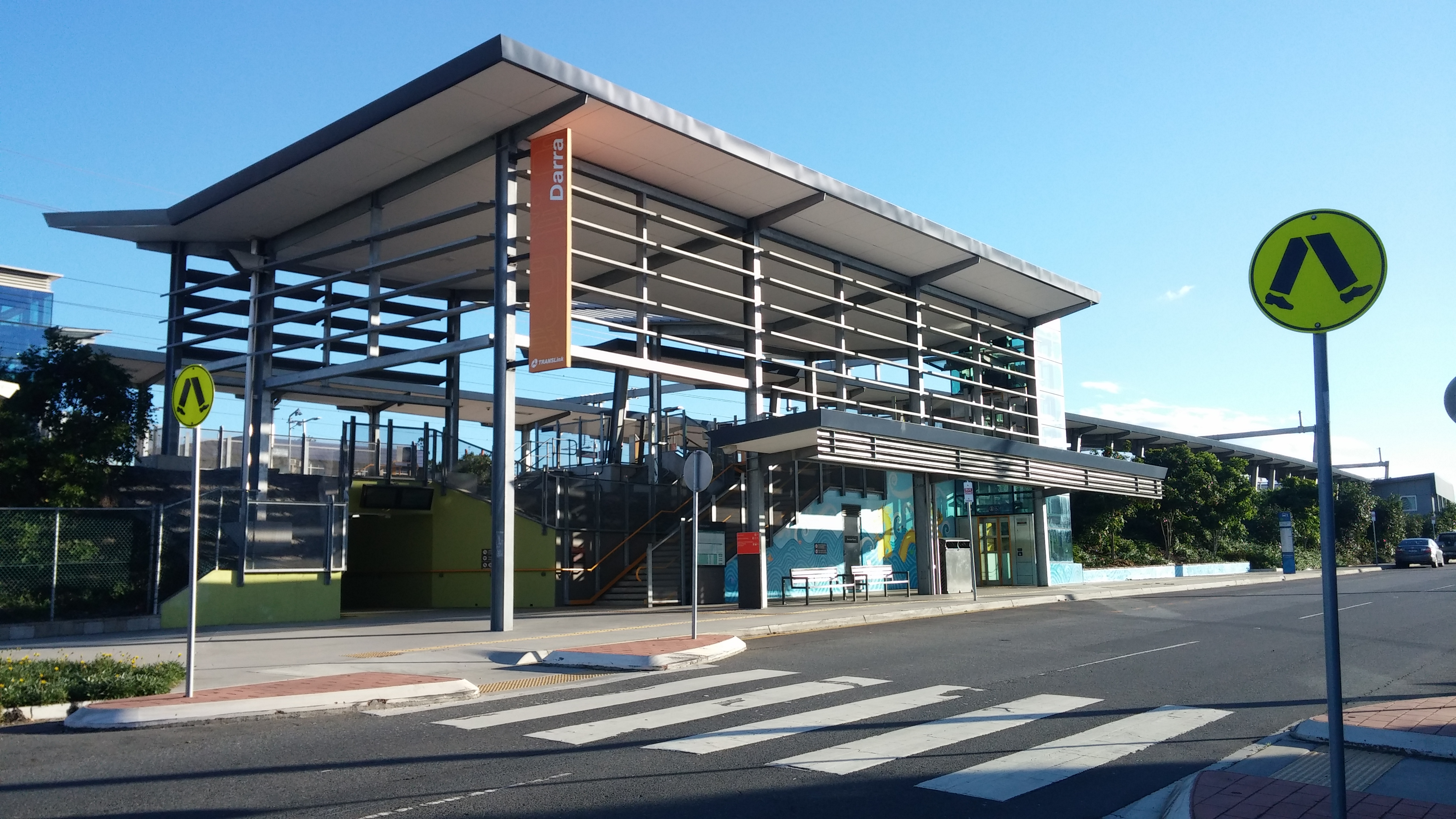
- Station front in April 2014

General information
- Location: Darra Station Road, Darra
- Coordinates: 27.5659°S 152.9524°E
- Elevation: 26 m (85 ft)
- Owner: Queensland Rail
- Operator: Queensland Rail
- Lines: T1 Ipswich/Rosewood; T2 Springfield Central
- Distance: 16.02 kilometres from Central
- Platforms: 4 (2 side, 1 island)
- Tracks: 4

Construction
- Structure type: Ground
- Parking: 260 bays
- Accessible: Yes

Other information
- Status: Staffed
- Station code: 600321 (platform 1); 600322 (platform 2); 600323 (platform 3); 600324 (platform 4)
- Fare zone: Zone 2
- Website: Queensland Rail

History
- Opened: 1874; 152 years ago
- Rebuilt: 1954; 72 years ago 2010; 16 years ago

Services
Preceding station	Queensland Rail	Following station
Oxley towards Caboolture via Roma Street	T1 Ipswich/Rosewood line	Wacol towards Ipswich or Rosewood
Oxley towards Kippa Ring via Roma Street	T2 Springfield Central line	Richlands towards Springfield Central
Location

Darra is a railway station operated by Queensland Rail on the Ipswich/Rosewood and Springfield lines. It opened in 1874 and serves the Brisbane suburb of Darra. It is a ground level station, featuring one island platform with two faces and two side platforms.

== History ==
A stop at "nine miles forty four chain" from Central was established when the line between Ipswich and Brisbane was built in 1874. Service on the line were operating in 1875. No stops at the site were recorded in 1876 or 1877, probably because the stop was not staffed until the following year when passengers were first recorded at Darra station. The name Darra is most probably derived from a Scottish railway town as some of the engineers who were responsible for naming stops were Scottish.

A siding at Darra was constructed in 1885 to enable the loading of firewood for Hicks & Gray. In 1954, four platforms were built at the station but only three were used. On 17 November 1979, the Darra to Ipswich line was electrified.

== Construction of the Springfield line ==
In 2010, the station was upgraded as part of the quadruplication of the line from Corinda to accommodate services for the Springfield line which has a junction with the Main line west of the station. The station at the time had 4 platforms (two islands) with only 3 in use. The original Platform 3 and 4 island had the track for Platform 4 removed, becoming a side platform and renumbered to become the new platform 4. The original platform 1 and 2 Island (only platform 2 was in use) was retained but upgraded, and renumbered platform 2 and 3. Two new tracks were built on the old platform 1 side of this island (now platform 2) and a new platform built beside the extra track (becoming new platform 1).

During construction a hand grenade was found by workers and then safely disposed of by army personnel.

The car park was expanded to include 60 new car park spaces and 40 extra cycle lockers.

== Services ==
Darra is served by Citytrain network services operating from Nambour, Caboolture, Kippa-Ring and Bowen Hills to Springfield Central, Ipswich and Rosewood.

== Platforms and services ==
Darra platform arrangement
Platform	Line	Destination	Notes
1	T1 Ipswich/Rosewood	Ipswich or Rosewood	
1	T2 Springfield Central	Springfield Central	
2	T1 Ipswich/Rosewood	Roma Street (to Caboolture and Nambour/Gympie North lines)	
2	T2 Springfield Central	Roma Street (to Kippa-Ring line)	
3			
4	T1 Ipswich/Rosewood	Roma Street (to Caboolture and Nambour/Gympie North lines)	
