= Chelmer railway station =

Railway station in Queensland, Australia

Chelmer
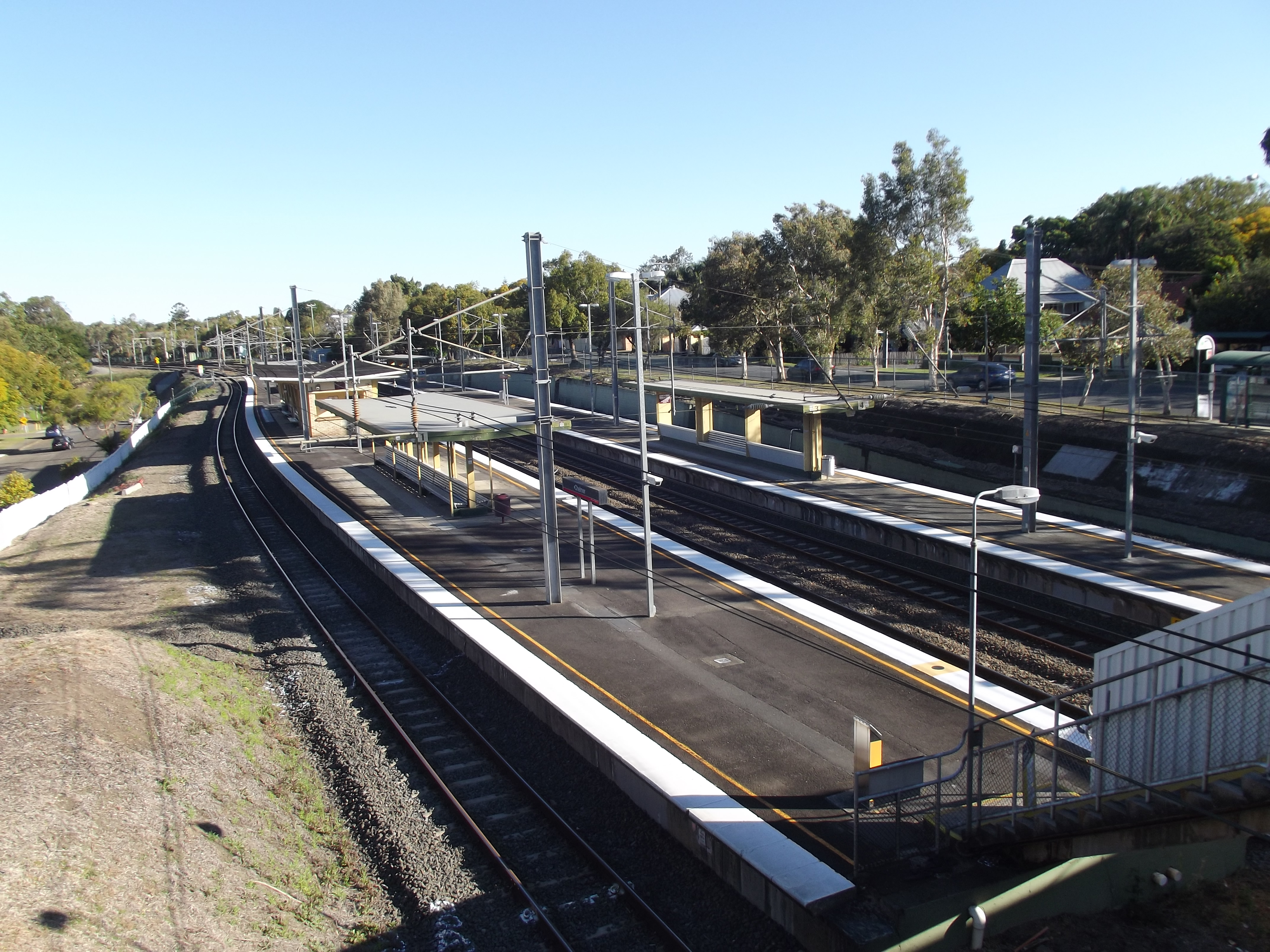
- Northbound view in August 2012

General information
- Location: Honour Avenue, Chelmer
- Coordinates: 27°30′43″S 152°58′22″E
- Owner: Queensland Rail
- Operator: Queensland Rail
- Lines: T1 Ipswich/Rosewood; T2 Springfield
- Distance: 8.46 kilometres from Central
- Platforms: 4 (2 island)

Construction
- Structure type: Ground

Other information
- Status: Staffed
- Station code: 600299 (platform 1); 600300 (platform 2); 600301 (platform 3); 600302 (platform 4)
- Fare zone: Zone 1
- Website: Queensland Rail

History
- Opened: 1881; 145 years ago
- Rebuilt: 1959; 67 years ago

Services
Preceding station	Queensland Rail	Following station
Indooroopilly towards Caboolture via Roma Street	T1 Ipswich/Rosewood line	Graceville towards Ipswich or Rosewood
Indooroopilly towards Kippa Ring via Roma Street	T2 Springfield line	Graceville towards Springfield Central
Location

Chelmer is a railway station operated by Queensland Rail on the Ipswich/Rosewood and Springfield lines. It opened in 1881 and serves the Brisbane suburb of Chelmer. It is a ground level station, featuring two island platforms with two faces each.

== History ==
The original station opened north of its current location in 1876 as Oxley's Point. In 1888, the station was renamed Riverton. A siding was built at the current Chelmer station location in 1881, which was later converted into the current Chelmer railway station in 1889. Riverton was closed that same year.

The line through Chelmer was duplicated in June 1886. The station was rebuilt in 1959 as part of the quadruplication of the line.

== Services ==
Chelmer is served by Citytrain network services operating from Nambour, Caboolture, Kippa-Ring and Bowen Hills to Springfield Central, Ipswich and Rosewood.

== Platforms and services ==
Chelmer platform arrangement
Platform	Line	Destination	Notes
1	T1 Ipswich/Rosewood	Ipswich or Rosewood	
1	T2 Springfield	Springfield Central	
2	T1 Ipswich/Rosewood	Roma Street (to Caboolture and Nambour/Gympie North lines)	
2	T2 Springfield	Roma Street (to Kippa-Ring line)	
3	T1 Ipswich/Rosewood	Ipswich or Rosewood	
4	T1 Ipswich/Rosewood	Roma Street (to Caboolture and Nambour/Gympie North lines)	
4	T2 Springfield	Roma Street (to Kippa-Ring line)	
