= Richlands, Queensland =

Richlands
- Suburb
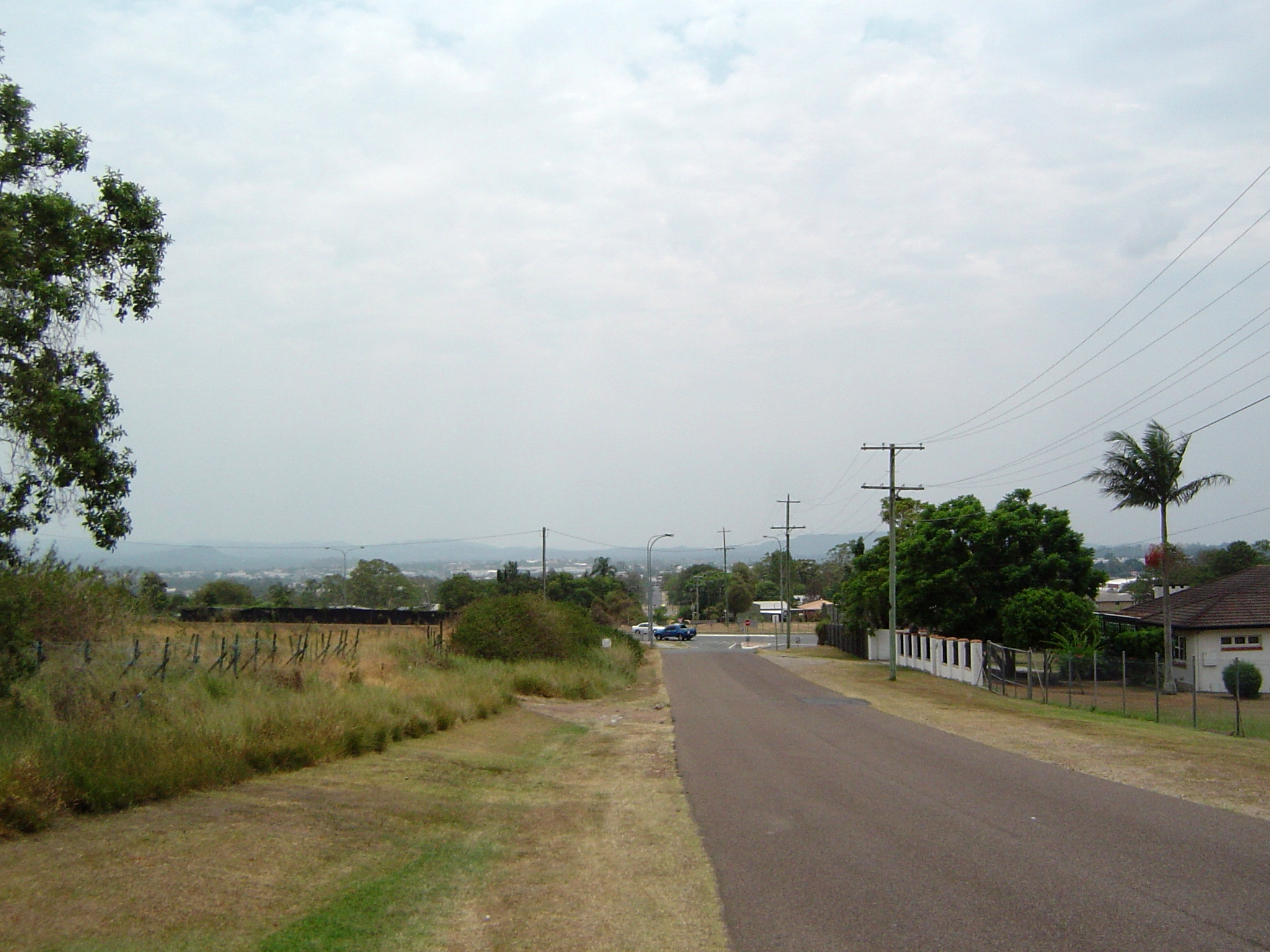
- Orchard Road, Richlands

- Interactive map of Richlands
- Coordinates: 27.5886°S 152.9538°E
- Country: Australia
- State: Queensland
- City: Brisbane
- LGA: City of Brisbane (Forest Lake Ward)
- Location: 19.6 km (12.2 mi) SW of Brisbane CBD
- Established: 1928

Government
  - State electorate: Inala
  - Federal division: Oxley

Area
  - Total: 5.0 km^{2} (1.9 sq mi)

Population
  - Total: 5,621 (2021 census)
  - Density: 1,124/km^{2} (2,912/sq mi)
- Time zone: UTC+10:00 (AEST)
- Postcode: 4077
Suburbs around Richlands
Wacol	Darra	Oxley
Wacol	Richlands	Inala
Wacol	Forest Lake	Inala

Richlands is an outer south-western suburb in the City of Brisbane, Queensland, Australia. In the 2021 census, Richlands had a population of 5,621 people.

== Geography ==
Richlands is 19.6 kilometres (12.2 mi) by road south-west of the Brisbane CBD.

The Centenary Motorway passes through the suburb from north-west (Darra) to south-west (Wacol / Forest Lake). The Springfield railway line runs parallel and to the immediate east of the motorway. Richlands railway station (27.5963°S 152.9470°E) serves the suburb.

The land use in the north and west of the suburb is industrial extending west into Wacol with the residential areas in the east and south of the suburb extending east into Inala. A few small areas of farmland still exist within the suburb.

Ric Nattrass Creek rises in the south of Richlands and flows north and exits the suburb to the north-west into Wacol where it becomes a tributary of Bullock Head Creek, then Wolston Creek, ultimately into the Brisbane River and Moreton Bay. It was named in 2013 after wildlife expert and conservationist Ric Nattrass (1949–2009).

== History ==
The name Richlands comes from the Richland Estate, which was a subdivision of small farms sold in 1928–1929. The farms were 4 acres (1.6 ha) and cost £55, and could be purchased for a deposit of £2 and monthly payments of 20 shillings. Richlands was part of the larger suburb of Darra until Richlands officially became a suburb in 1975.

Early industries in the suburb were dairy and poultry farming, honey production and table grape growing.

On 12 June 1934, Richlands State School was opened with one teacher on the north-east corner of Orchard Road and Old Progress Road (27.5957°S 152.9562°E). It closed on 31 December 2010. The school's website was archived. The school site was purchased by the Brisbane City Council and it is now used by the Richlands Community Centre and the local branch of the Queensland State Emergency Service.

Richlands East State School opened on 23 January 1967 in Poinsettia Street (27.5976°S 152.9679°E). It is now within the boundaries of Inala.

Richlands State High School opened on 27 January 1970 in Poinsettia Street immediately west of Richlands East State School (27.5979°S 152.9645°E). In the 1990s it was decided to amalgamate Richlands State High School with Inala State High School to create a new school called Glenala State High School. The amalgamation commenced in 1996 when the Year 8, 9, and 11 students were transferred into the new school, while the Years 10 and 12 student completed their final year at Richlands, after which the Richlands State High School was closed completely on 13 December 1996.

== Demographics ==
In the 2011 census, Richlands had a population of 2,076 people, 51.4% female and 48.6% male. The median age of the Richlands population was 29 years, 8 years below the Australian median. 52.8% of people living in Richlands were born in Australia, compared to the national average of 69.8%; the next most common countries of birth were Vietnam 10.3%, New Zealand 8.9%, England 2.4%, Philippines 2.2%, India 1.9%. 54.8% of people spoke only English at home; the next most common languages were 17.2% Vietnamese, 3.8% Samoan, 2.3% Hindi, 1.7% Italian, 1.1% Spanish.

In the 2016 census, Richlands had a population of 3,598 people.

In the 2021 census, Richlands had a population of 5,621 people.

== Heritage listings ==
Richlands has a number of heritage-listed sites including:

- 48 Bandara Street: Serbian Orthodox Church of St Nicholas
- 75 Old Progress Road: Richlands State School (former)

== Education ==
There are no schools in Richlands. The nearest government primary schools are Richlands East State School and Inala State School both in Inala to the east, Darra State School in Darra to the north, and Carole Park State School in Wacol to the west. The nearest government secondary schools are Glenala State High School in Durack to the east and Forest Lake State High School in Forest Lake to the south.

== Amenities ==
Services and organisations located in Richlands include the Magistrates Court, Queensland State Emergency Service, and Richlands Community Centre. Shopping precincts include Richlands Plaza and Progress Corner.

Richlands Plaza shopping and business centre on Archerfield Road offers a major supermarket, adjacent shops, services, cafes and a gym.

The suburb is home to Queensland Lions Football Club who play in the Brisbane Premier League.

CJ Greenfield Park includes football and soccer fields, cricket grounds, basketball courts, walking trails, and a children's playground. Other sporting facilities in Richlands include Pony Club, West Brisbane Tennis Centre, and Ten Pin Bowling. The suburb is home to a number of recreational clubs such as the Richlands Tenpin Bowl which opened in 1991 and the Darra Oxley Pony Club.

The Richlands drive-in theatre opened in the late 1970s at 295 Archerfield Road (27.5869°S 152.9581°E), closing in December 2000 making it the last to be operating in Brisbane.
