= Springfield Central line =

Passenger rail service in Queensland, Australia

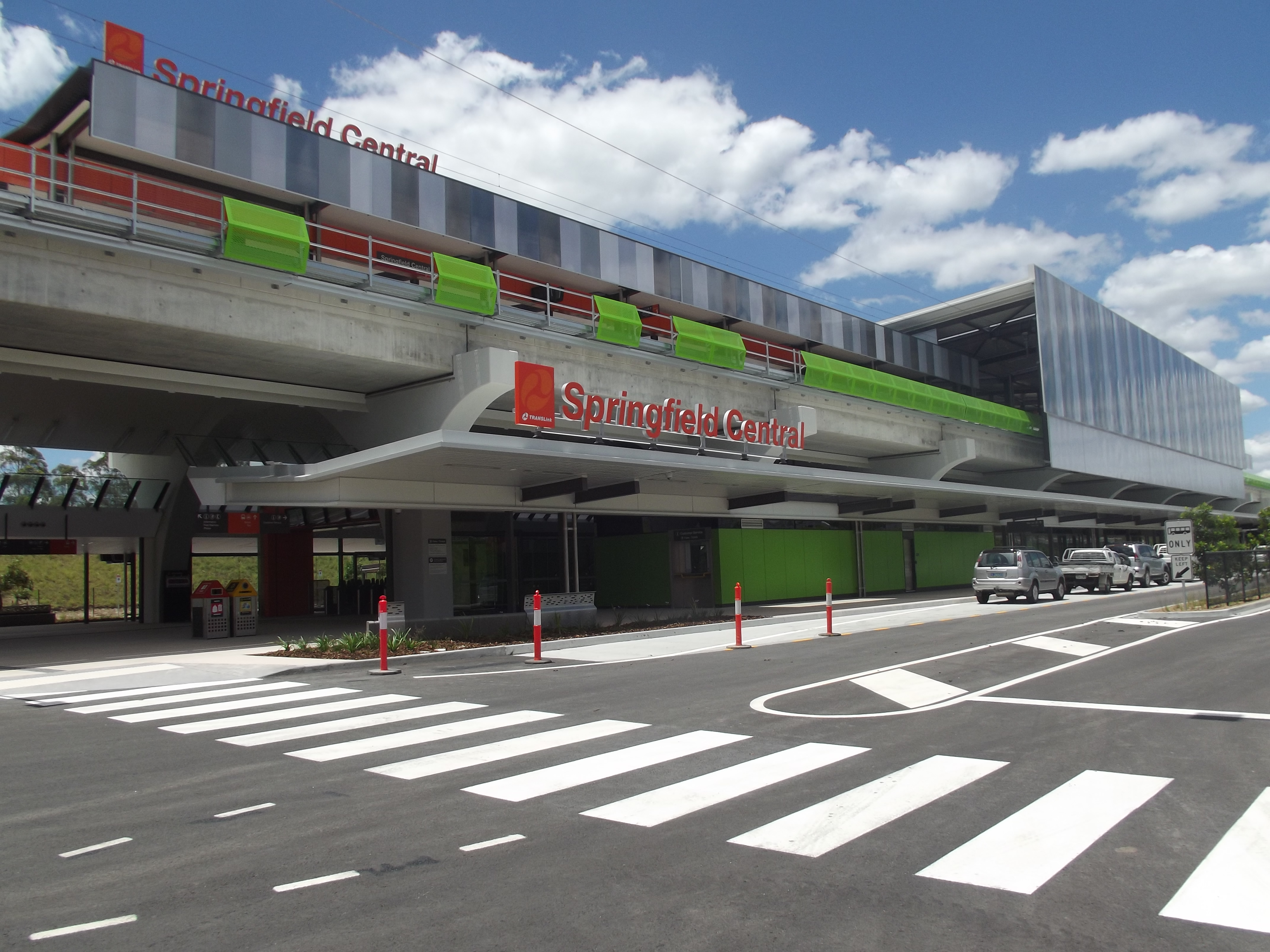
- Springfield Central station in December 2013

Overview

Technical
- Track length: 16.0 km (9.9 mi)
- Number of tracks: Quadruple to Darra, double track to Springfield Central
- Track gauge: 1,067 mm (3 ft 6 in)
- Electrification: 2013
- Operating speed: 140 km/h (87 mph)

The T2 Springfield Central line is an interurban commuter railway line in South East Queensland, Australia. Operated by Queensland Rail, the line runs for 28.8 kilometres (18 miles) from Springfield Central to Roma Street, where services continue on the Kippa-Ring line.

The line speed is rated for speeds of up to 140 km/h (87 mph) in most sections. However, only the interurban multiple unit 100 and 120 series and New Generation Rollingstock trains can run at the full speed of the line. The current timetable is based on a top speed of 120 km/h (75 mph) between Richlands and Springfield stations, which is faster than the Centenary Motorway that runs alongside.

Services on this line are the busiest on the Brisbane network.

== Construction and opening ==
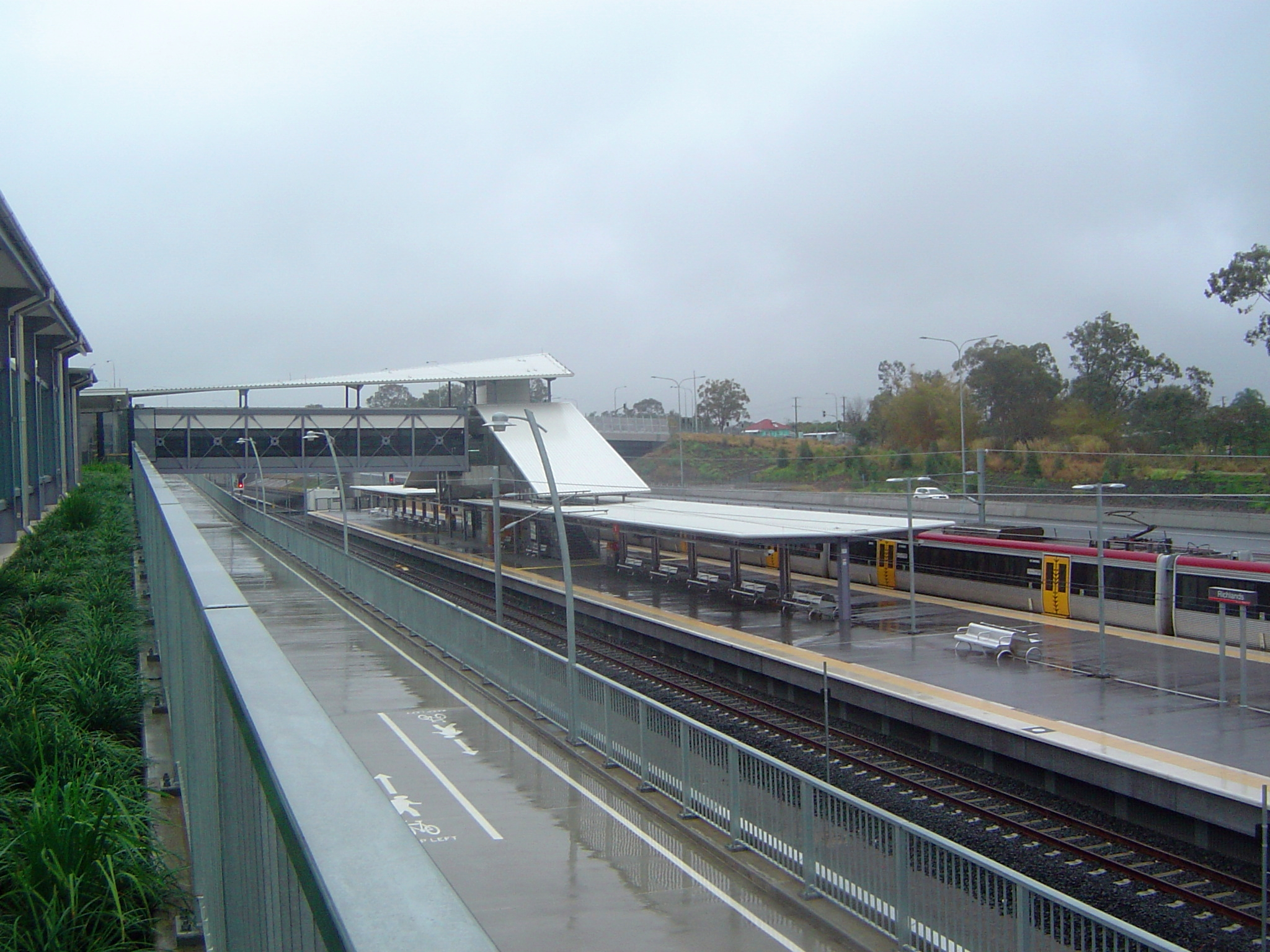
Richlands railway station, 2011

Construction of the first stage of the line, to Richlands, started on 5 July 2010, with the first sleeper being laid at Darra on the Ipswich line. The line was developed along with the widening of the nearby Centenary Motorway from two to four lanes from Darra through to the Logan Motorway. The original completion date was for 2015. However this was bought forward to 2013.

Construction of the first station on the line, Richlands, started on 1 July 2008, and the line was due to begin service on 23 January 2011 without service from Darra to the City due to scheduled maintenance works on the Ipswich line.

The opening was brought forward to 17 January 2011 to assist travellers from further west who could not use the Ipswich line, which was out of service due to Queensland floods.

On 23 October 2011, work started on the second stage of the line to Springfield. The station originally proposed as Springfield Lakes station was renamed Springfield, and the one proposed as Springfield station renamed Springfield Central.

The extension to Springfield Central began service on 2 December 2013.

A proposal exists to extend the line from its present terminus at Springfield Central to Redbank Plains, Ripley Valley, Yamanto, and Ipswich station.

On 10 August 2026, the Springfield line was numbered T2 (along with the Kippa-Ring line) and renamed the Springfield Central line.

== Network and operations ==
=== Route ===
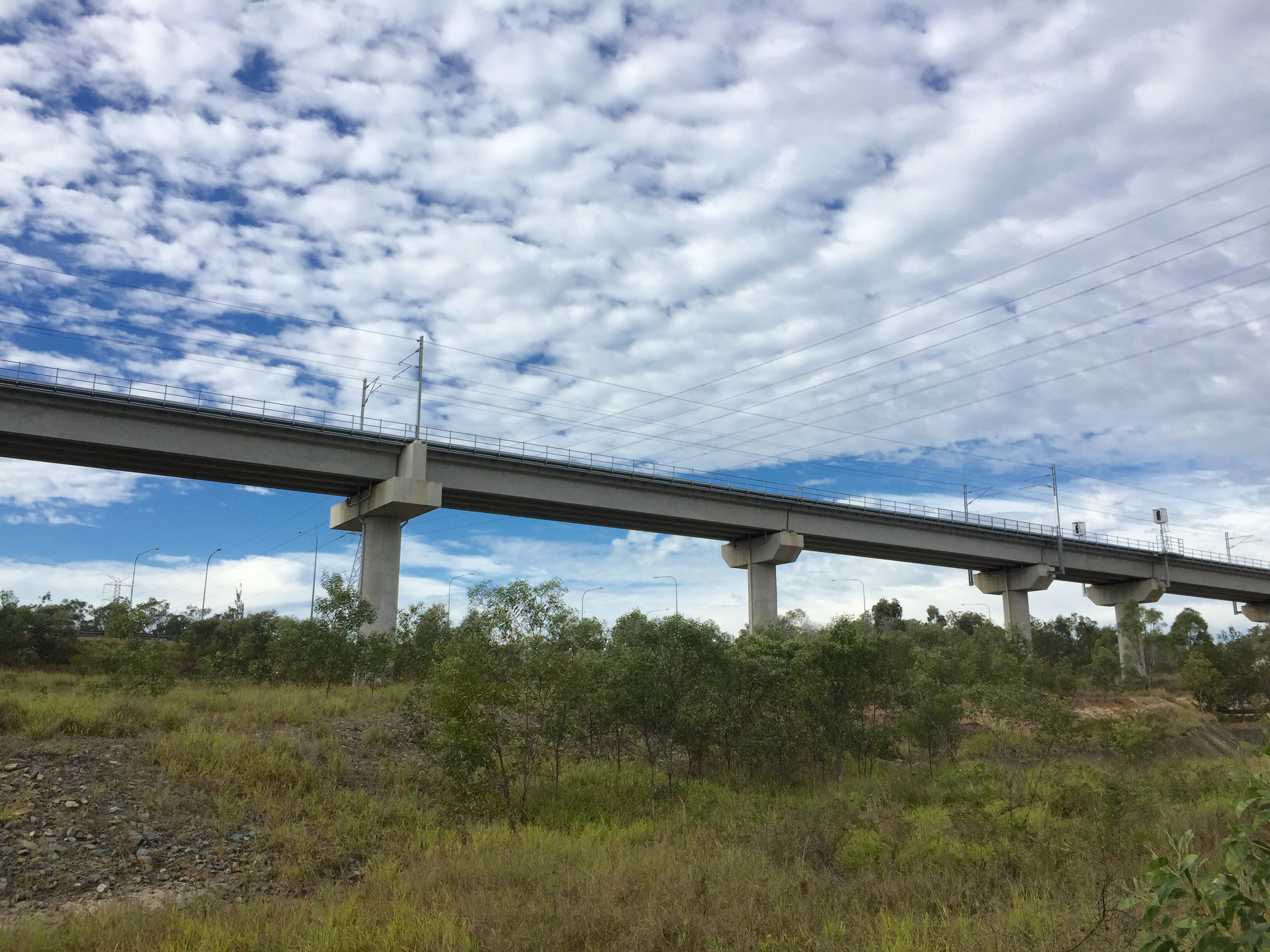
Over 800 metres long, the railway viaduct has piers designed to allow for the planned expansions of nearby Logan and Centenary Motorways.

Passengers would change for or from the Ipswich and Rosewood lines at Darra; Beenleigh, Gold Coast and Cleveland lines at Roma Street; and all other lines at Central.

The route crosses the interchange between the Logan Motorway and Centenary Motorway on a two-track viaduct more than 800 metres (2,600 ft) long. The viaduct has been designed so that its piers do not obstruct planned expansions of both roads.

=== Stations ===
List of T2 Springfield Central line stations
T2 Springfield Central line
Station	Image	Suburb	Opened	Terrain	Connections	Time (Note: Travel time in minutes from Roma Street.)
	Continues from T2 Kippa-Ring line					
Roma Street		Brisbane CBD	14 June 1875	Ground	Sunshine Coast line, Queensland Doomben Shorncliffe line Airport line, Brisbane Ferny Grove line Brisbane Metro Bus transport in Queensland	0
Milton		Milton	1884	Ground	Ipswich/Rosewood line Ferry transport in Queensland	3
Auchenflower		Auchenflower	1887	Ground	Ipswich/Rosewood line	5
Toowong		Toowong	1875	Built over	Ipswich/Rosewood line	7
Taringa		Taringa	1875	Ground	Ipswich/Rosewood line	10
Indooroopilly		Indooroopilly	1875	Ground	Ipswich/Rosewood line	12
Chelmer		Chelmer	1881	Ground	Ipswich/Rosewood line	14
Graceville		Graceville	1876	Ground	Ipswich/Rosewood line	16
Sherwood		Sherwood	1874	Ground	Ipswich/Rosewood line	18
Corinda		Corinda	1875	Ground	Ipswich/Rosewood line	20
Oxley		Oxley	1874	Ground	Ipswich/Rosewood line	23
Darra		Darra	1874	Ground	Ipswich/Rosewood line	26
Richlands		Richlands	17 January 2011	Ground	none	30
Springfield		Springfield	12 December 2013	Sunken	none	36
Springfield Central		Springfield Central	12 December 2013	Elevated	none	39

== Proposed extensions ==
In the Connecting SEQ 2031 Plan, the QLD Government has listed an UrbanLink high frequency (15min) service running from Darra to Springfield, and on to Redbank Plains via Augustine Heights, as an extension to the existing line. It also talks about an ExpressLink (30min frequency) between Ipswich and Ripley, via UQ Ipswich (now USQ Ipswich), Churchill, Yamanto and Deebing Heights; with the vital corridor between Ripley and Redbank plains being reserved for a later time after 2031. In 2019, the City of Ipswich completed an overview of the Ipswich Central to Springfield Central public transport corridor with a focus on the proposed extension.

The lines are shown in the map below.

== See also ==
- South East Queensland Infrastructure Plan and Program
