= Springfield Central railway station =

Railway station in Queensland, Australia

Springfield Central
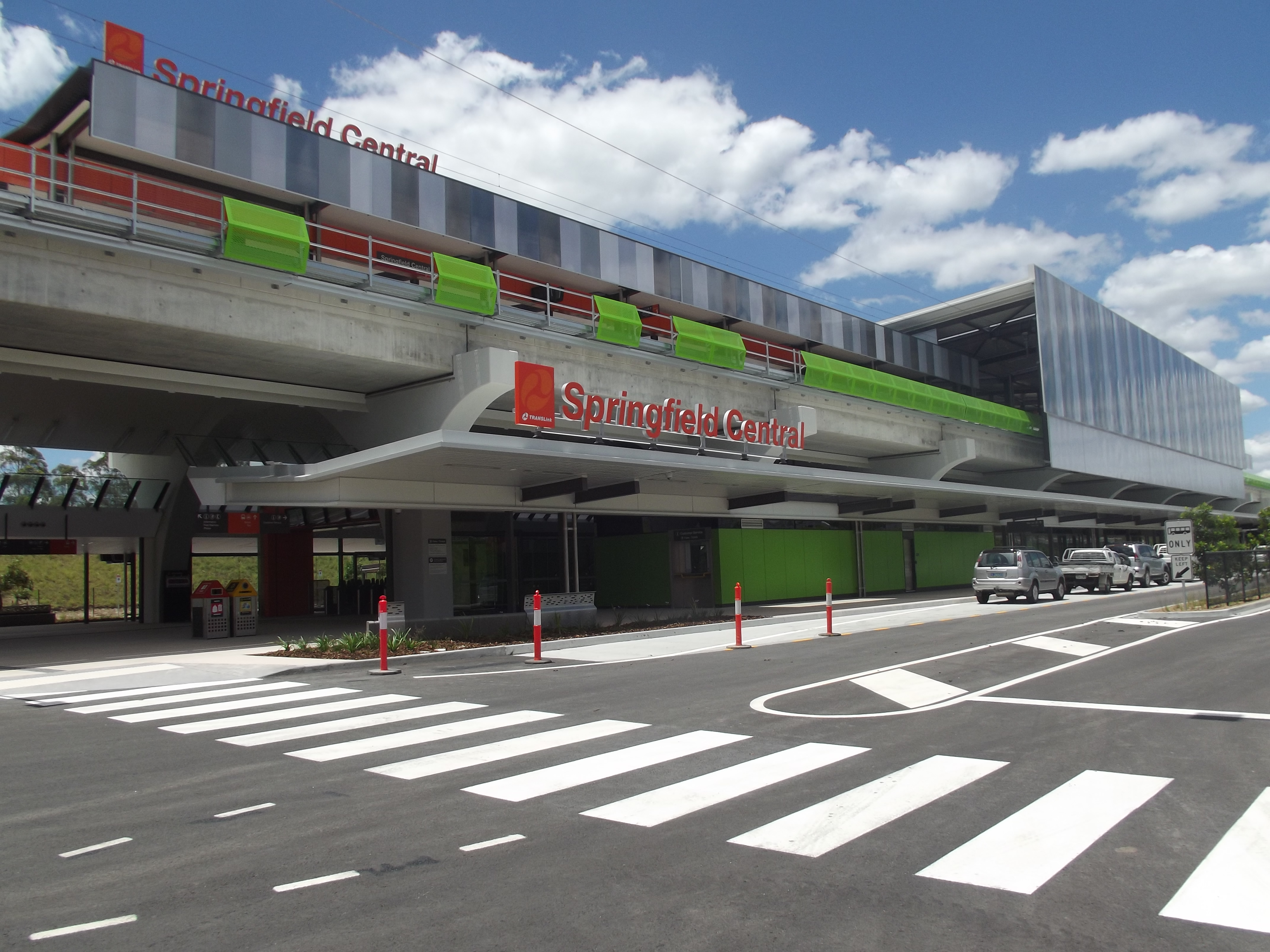
- Station front in December 2013

General information
- Location: Trackstar Drive, Springfield Central
- Coordinates: 27.6743°S 152.9029°E
- Owner: Queensland Rail
- Operator: Queensland Rail
- Line: T2 Springfield
- Distance: 30.20 kilometres from Central
- Platforms: 2 (1 island)
- Tracks: 2
- Connections: Bus

Construction
- Structure type: Elevated
- Parking: 500 bays
- Cycle facilities: 120
- Accessible: Yes

Other information
- Status: Staffed
- Station code: 600089 (platform 1); 600090 (platform 2)
- Fare zone: Zone 3
- Website: Queensland Rail

History
- Opened: 2 December 2013; 12 years ago

Services
Preceding station	Queensland Rail	Following station
Springfield towards Kippa Ring via Roma Street	T2 Springfield line	Terminus
Location

Springfield Central is a railway station operated by Queensland Rail on the Springfield line. It opened in 2013 and serves the Brisbane suburb of Springfield Central. It is an elevated level station, featuring one island platform with two faces.

== History ==
Springfield Central Station was part of the Queensland Government's Darra to Springfield Transport Corridor project, aimed at providing effective public transport infrastructure for the fast-growing western region between Brisbane and Ipswich. Works began on the extension to Springfield Central after Richlands Station was completed in early 2011. Initially, Springfield Central station was planned to be named Springfield, with the current Springfield station to be named Springfield Lakes. A public open day was held on 1 December 2013 following the completion of the line, with scheduled services commencing at 5:39 am the next morning, on Monday.

== Station precinct ==
Springfield Central Station's 12 m (39 ft) wide island platform is elevated above the station concourse and is almost entirely covered by the roof structure (a feature not present in most Queensland Rail City Network stations). The concourse runs the length of the station, and is surrounded by glass along large portions of both sides. Toilets and secure bicycle storage facilities are located on the concourse. There are go card gate terminals at both ends of the concourse, with the station office located on the western end. A coffee shop once occupied the same position on the eastern end; however, the café has since closed. Flights of stairs are located at both ends to reach the platform, as well as escalators and a lift for disability access towards the middle.

There are multiple electronic display screens located along the length of the platform and at either end of the concourse to provide customers with information regarding departing services, as well as prominent permanent signage (including some with braille for the visually impaired) throughout the precinct. Customers with hearing impairment are able to use an audio induction loop through their hearing aids in order to listen directly to station announcements.

The station precinct incorporates a platform-length series of bus bays (only one of which is currently in use) on the northern side and a pick-up/drop-off zone on the southern side. On the southern side of the Centenary Highway is a 100-vehicle car park, with an additional 400 spaces available off Springfield Greenbank Arterial Road, connected to the station concourse by a footbridge. The 400-space car park was completed in early 2014 following a reassessment of parking availability, as it was determined that 100 spaces would be insufficient for the number of people using the station. Road and pedestrian access to the station is via two highway underpasses from Southern Cross Circuit—one on Trackstar Drive, and the other on Sir Llew Edwards Drive—as well as via the 400-space car park. Both underpasses are bordered by painted murals.

== Platforms and services ==
Springfield Central platform arrangement
Platform	Line	Destination	Notes
1	T2 Springfield	Roma Street (to Kippa-Ring line)	
2	T2 Springfield	Roma Street (to Kippa-Ring line)	

== Transport links ==
The Westside Bus Company operates four bus routes via Springfield Central station using the name Bus Queensland, plus one additional school service each weekday morning. All buses depart from Stop A, at the western end of the station. The routes are:

- 522: Orion Springfield Central to Goodna Station (including one additional morning and afternoon service on school days only)
- 526: Orion Springfield Central to Redbank Station
- 531: Orion Springfield Central to Yamanto via Ripley
- 534: Orion Springfield Central to Browns Plains
- 5240: Old Logan Road to Orion Springfield Central (one morning service on school days only)
