= Karrabin, Queensland =

Karrabin
- Suburb
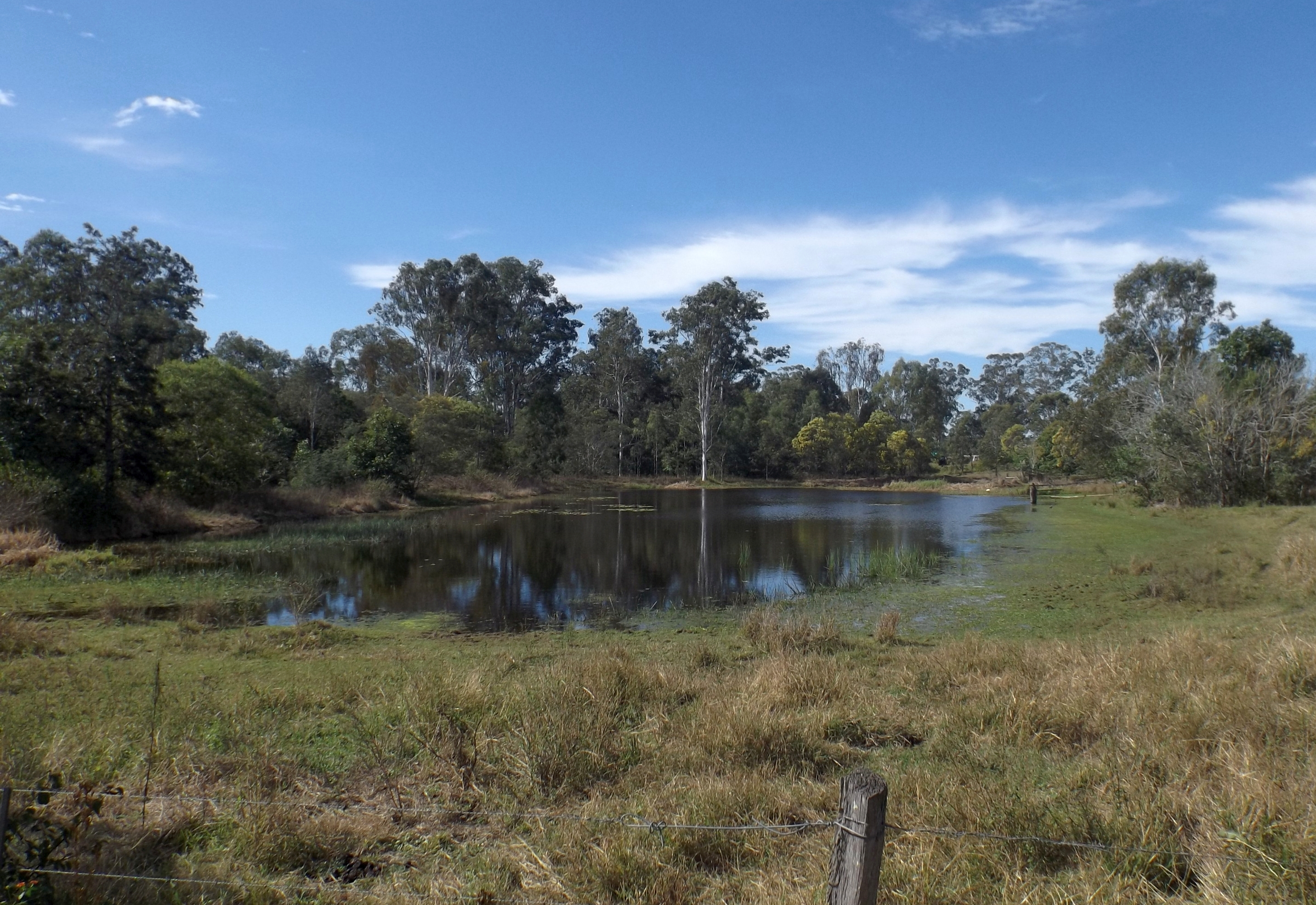
- Dam along Redhill Road, 2015

- Interactive map of Karrabin
- Coordinates: 27.5961°S 152.7055°E
- Country: Australia
- State: Queensland
- City: Ipswich
- LGA: City of Ipswich
- Location: 6.5 km (4.0 mi) NW of Ipswich CBD; 49.9 km (31.0 mi) WSW of Brisbane CBD

Government
  - State electorate: Ipswich West
  - Federal division: Blair

Area
  - Total: 10.8 km^{2} (4.2 sq mi)

Population
  - Total: 416 (2021 census)
  - Density: 38.52/km^{2} (99.8/sq mi)
- Time zone: UTC+10:00 (AEST)
- Postcode: 4306
Suburbs around Karrabin
Ironbark	Blacksoil	Brassall
Walloon	Karrabin	Brassall
Amberley	Amberley	Wulkuraka

Karrabin is a rural locality in the City of Ipswich, Queensland, Australia. In the 2021 census, Karrabin had a population of 416 people.

== Geography ==
The locality is bounded to the north by the Warrego Highway.

The Rosewood railway line enters the locality from the south-west (Wulkaraka) and exits to the west (Walloon) with Karrabin railway station serving the locality (27.6044°S 152.7091°E).

The land use is a mixture of rural residential and grazing on native vegetation.

== History ==
The origin of the suburb name is from the Bundjalung Aboriginal language meaning red gum.

Karrabin State School opened on 4 July 1932 and closed on 15 June 1958.

West Moreton Anglican College opened in 1994.

== Demographics ==
At the 2011 census, Karrabin had a population of 474 people, 48.5% female and 51.5% male. The median/average age of the Karrabin population is 39 years of age, 2 years above the Australian average. 86.9% of people living in Karrabin were born in Australia. The other top responses for country of birth were New Zealand 2.7%, England 2.1%, Germany 0.6%, Fiji 0.6%, Jamaica 0.6%. 96% of people speak English as their first language 0.6% French, 0.6% Mandarin, 0.6% Greek.

In the 2016 census, Karrabin had a population of 423 people.

In the 2021 census, Karrabin had a population of 416 people.

== Education ==
West Moreton Anglican College is a private primary and secondary (Prep-12) school for boys and girls at Keswick Road (27.5892°S 152.7049°E). In 2018, the school had an enrolment of 1,411 students with 101 teachers (99 full-time equivalent) and 73 non-teaching staff (67 full-time equivalent).

There are no government schools in Karrabin. The nearest government primary schools are Walloon State School in neighbouring Walloon to the west, Leichhardt State School in Leichhardt in Ipswich to the south, and Blair State School in Sadliers Crossing in Ipswich to the south-east. The nearest government secondary school is Ipswich State High School in neighbouring Brassall to the east.

== Economy ==
There are a number of homesteads in the locality, including:

- Karners (27.5828°S 152.7002°E)
- Larsens (27.5841°S 152.7101°E)

== Transport ==
Karrabin Railway Station provides Queensland Rail City network services to Rosewood, Ipswich and Brisbane via Ipswich.
