= Haigslea, Queensland =

Haigslea
- Suburb
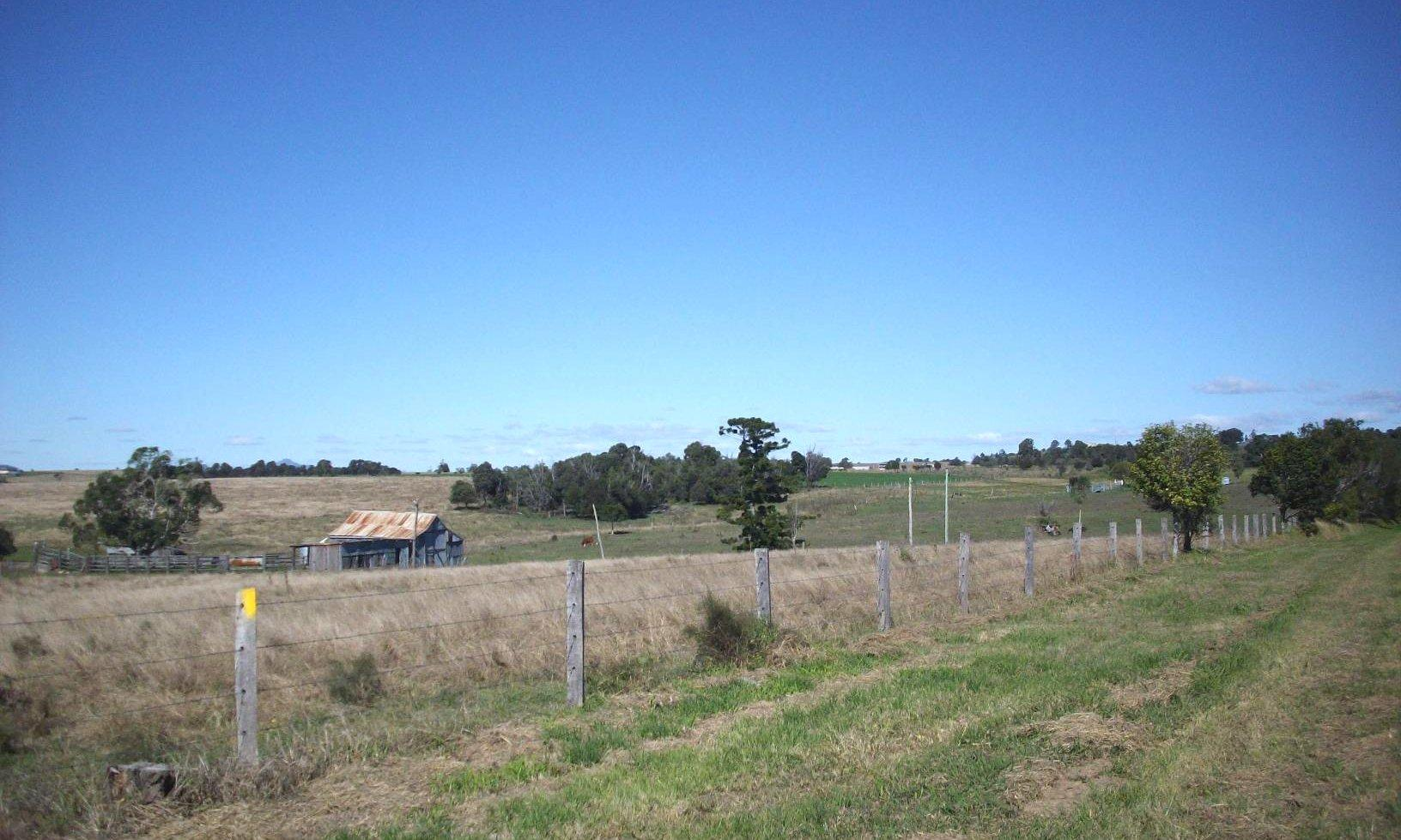

- Interactive map of Haigslea
- Coordinates: 27.5667°S 152.6333°E
- Country: Australia
- State: Queensland
- City: Ipswich
- LGAs: City of Ipswich; Somerset Region
- Location: 12.9 km (8.0 mi) NW of Rosewood; 15.8 km (9.8 mi) SSE of Lowood; 17.4 km (10.8 mi) NW of Ipswich; 53.2 km (33.1 mi) SE of Esk; 54.3 km (33.7 mi) WSW of Brisbane CBD

Government
  - State electorates: Ipswich West; Lockyer
  - Federal division: Blair

Area
  - Total: 21.9 km^{2} (8.5 sq mi)

Population
  - Total: 507 (2021 census)
  - Density: 23.15/km^{2} (59.96/sq mi)
- Time zone: UTC+10:00 (AEST)
- Postcode: 4306
Suburbs around Haigslea
Glamorgan Vale	Glamorgan Vale	Borallon
Marburg	Haigslea	Ironbark
Mount Marrow	Thagoona	Walloon

Haigslea, formerly known as Kirchheim (German: [ˈkɪʁçhaɪm], KEERKH-hyme), is a locality split between the City of Ipswich and the Somerset Region in South East Queensland, Australia. In the 2021 census, Haigslea had a population of 507 people.

== History ==
The area was originally called Kirchheim by the many German people who settled there as immigrants between 1865 and 1873. It was renamed Haigslea due to anti-German sentiment during the First World War. The locality is named after General Douglas Haig. He served in India in 1887. He was appointed the regiment's adjutant in 1888, and appointed Commander-in-chief of the British Army in France from 1915 to 1918.

On 9 July 1873, St Paul's Lutheran church was dedicated by Pastor C. Baustadt. A manse was built beside the church in 1874. The manse was replaced with a new building in 1895 (this building was moved to Marburg in 1904). On 17 November 1923, the church was destroyed in a cyclone. A replacement church was built at Haigslea (formerly Kirchheim) and re-dedicated on 13 April 1924. A new church building was opened in April 1924 with 300 people in attendance. On 7 March 1971, the church held its last service before closing. The church building is no longer on the site.

Walloon Scrub State School opened on 12 July 1876. In September 1884, it was renamed Kirchheim State School. By 1885 it had 95 students under headmaster Mr. Berry assisted by three pupil teachers. On 16 October 1916, it was renamed Haigslea State School.

The first hotel in the area opened in the late 1870s. It was the Crown Hotel built by Wiegand Raabe. By 1885 Henry Lutz was the publican. The site has been continuously used as a hotel with the current building, the Sundowner Hotel, built in the late 1970s.

By 1885, a Wesleyan Methodist Church had been established in the area.

By 1885, a German Evangelical Lutheran Church was established in the area. In 1896 it became a Wesleyan Methodist Church. In 1981, having closed, the building was moved to Haigslea Uniting Church to be used as a church hall.

A Congregational Church opened in 1911 at 765-767 Thagoona Haigslea Road (27.5711°S 152.6303°E) by a break-away from St Paul's Lutheran Church by members of the congregation who wanted services held in English rather than German. In 1972, faced with declining congregations, Haigslea Congregational Church, Walloon Congregational Church, Rosewood Congregational Church and the Lowood Methodist Church joined together as the Lowood-Roseville Cooperative Parish. The Haigslea Congregational Church became the Haigslea Uniting Church in June 1977 as part of the amalgamation of the Congregational, Methodist and Presbyterian churches that created the Uniting Church in Australia. In 1981, the former Kirchheim/Haigslea Methodist Church was closed and relocated to this site as a church hall. The Haigslea Uniting Church closed on 29 March 2020.

Australian Motorcycle Museum was at 3 Butlers Road (27.5711°S 152.6221°E). It closed in 2014.

== Demographics ==
At the 2011 census, the suburb recorded a population of 414, 48.1% female and 51.9% male. The median/average age of the Haigslea population is 43 years of age, 6 years above the Australian average. 84.4% of people living in Haigslea were born in Australia. The other top responses for country of birth were England 3.4%, New Zealand 1.9%, Germany 0.7%, Ireland 0.7%, Barbados 0.7%. 94.7% of people speak English as their first language 1% Czech.

In the 2016 census, Haigslea had a population of 468 people.

In the 2021 census, Haigslea had a population of 507 people.

== Education ==
Haigslea State School is a government primary (Prep-6) school for boys and girls at 760-766 Thagoona Haigslea Road (27.5717°S 152.6297°E). In 2018, the school had an enrolment of 74 students with 6 teachers (4 full-time equivalent) and 7 non-teaching staff (3 full-time equivalent).

There are no secondary schools in Haigslea. The nearest government secondary schools are Rosewood State High School in Rosewood to the south, Ipswich State High School in Brassall in Ipswich to the south-east and Lowood State High School in Lowood to the north-west.

== Amenities ==
Len Claus Kirchheim Park is at 1-7 Haigslea Malabar Road (27.5705°S 152.6298°E). It features open green space and picnic facilities.

The Sundowner Hotel is at 2316 Warrego Highway (27.5685°S 152.6220°E). It features one of Australia's big things, a large sculpture in the shape of a bottle of Bundaberg Rum, with the other one situated at the Bundaberg Rum Distillery in Bundaberg.

Haigslea Lawn Cemetery (also known as Walloon Scrub-Kircheim-Kirchheiner-Walloon) is at 33-41 Haigslea Cemetery Road (27.5780°S 152.6588°E). It is managed by the Ipswich City Council.

== See also ==
- Australian place names changed from German names
