= Blacksoil, Queensland =

Blacksoil
- Suburb
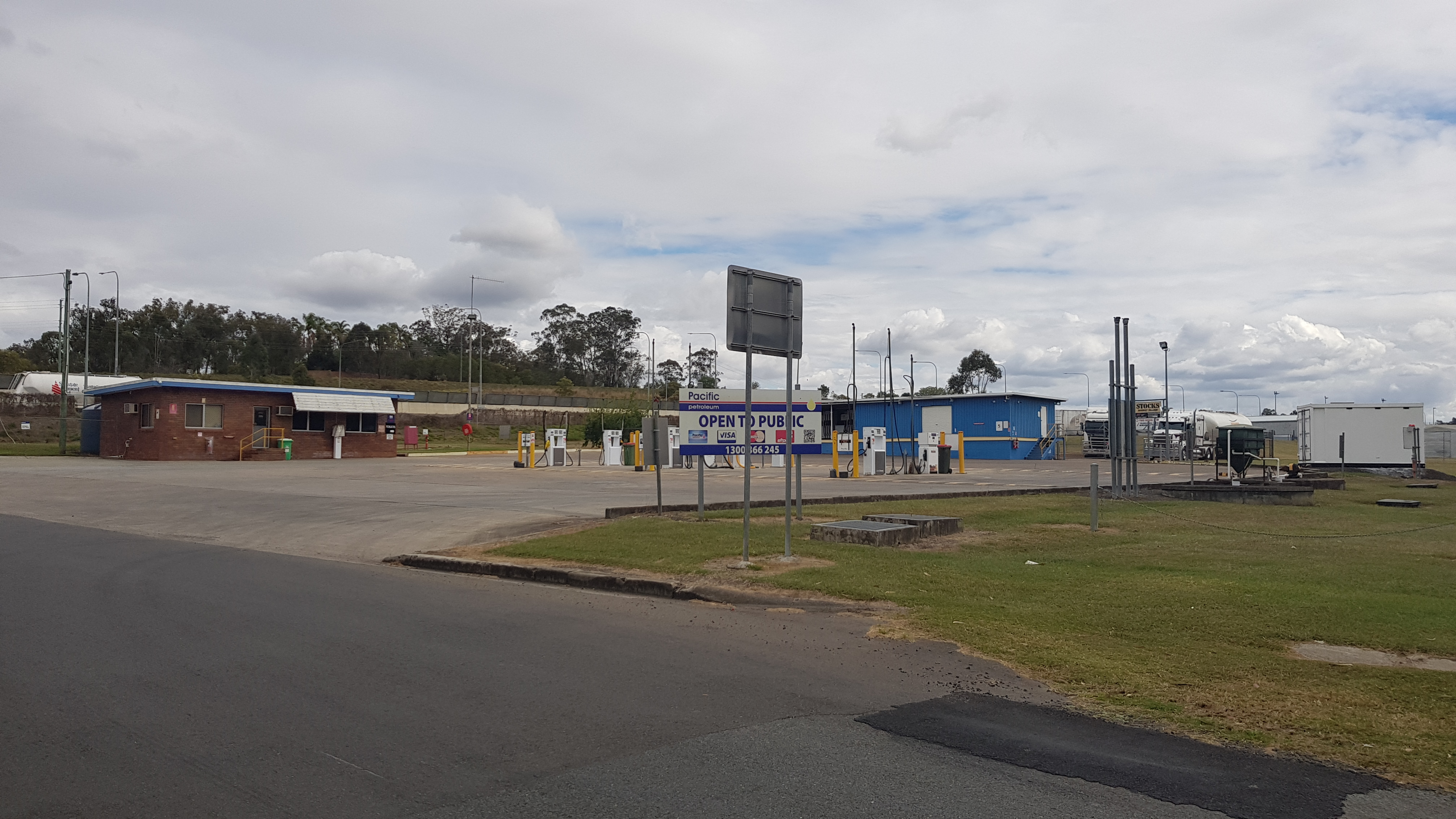
- Eleazar Drive, 2023

- Interactive map of Blacksoil
- Coordinates: 27.5777°S 152.7063°E
- Country: Australia
- State: Queensland
- City: Ipswich
- LGA: City of Ipswich
- Location: 10.9 km (6.8 mi) NW of Ipswich CBD; 47.4 km (29.5 mi) WSW of Brisbane CBD

Government
  - State electorate: Ipswich West
  - Federal division: Blair

Area
  - Total: 1.8 km^{2} (0.69 sq mi)

Population
  - Total: 106 (2021 census)
  - Density: 58.9/km^{2} (153/sq mi)
- Time zone: UTC+10:00 (AEST)
- Postcode: 4306
Suburbs around Blacksoil
Ironbark	Pine Mountain	Pine Mountain
Karrabin	Blacksoil	Brassall
Karrabin	Karrabin	Brassall

Blacksoil is a rural locality in the City of Ipswich, Queensland, Australia. In the 2021 census, Blacksoil had a population of 106 people.

== Geography ==
The Warrego Highway enters from the east (Brassall / Pine Mountain) and exits to the west (Ironbark / Karrabin). The Brisbane Valley Highway commences in Blacksoil, splitting from the Warrego Highway in the west of the suburb and exiting to the north-west (Karrabin / Pine Mountain).

The land use in the north of the locality is mostly rural residential housing. Apart from this, the predominant land use is grazing on native vegetation.

== History ==
Blacksoil was officially named as a locality by the Queensland Place Names Board on 1 July 1978. It was officially bounded on 8 September 2000. However, the name which refers to the black soil in the area has been in use since the 1860s.

== Demographics ==
In the 2016 census, Blacksoil had a population of 104 people.

In the 2021 census, Blacksoil had a population of 106 people.

== Education ==
There are no schools in Blacksoil. The nearest government primary schools are Brassall State School in neighbouring Brassall to the south-west and Walloon State School in Walloon to the south-west. The nearest government secondary school is Ipswich State High School, also in Brassall.

== Amenities ==
Ironpot Creek Reserve is at 1415 Warrego Highway (27.5760°S 152.7140°E). Ironmonger Park is within the reserved and is accessed via Chablis Place. It offers play areas, BBQs, and picnic facilities.
