= Ipswich/Rosewood line =

Passenger rail service in Queensland, Australia

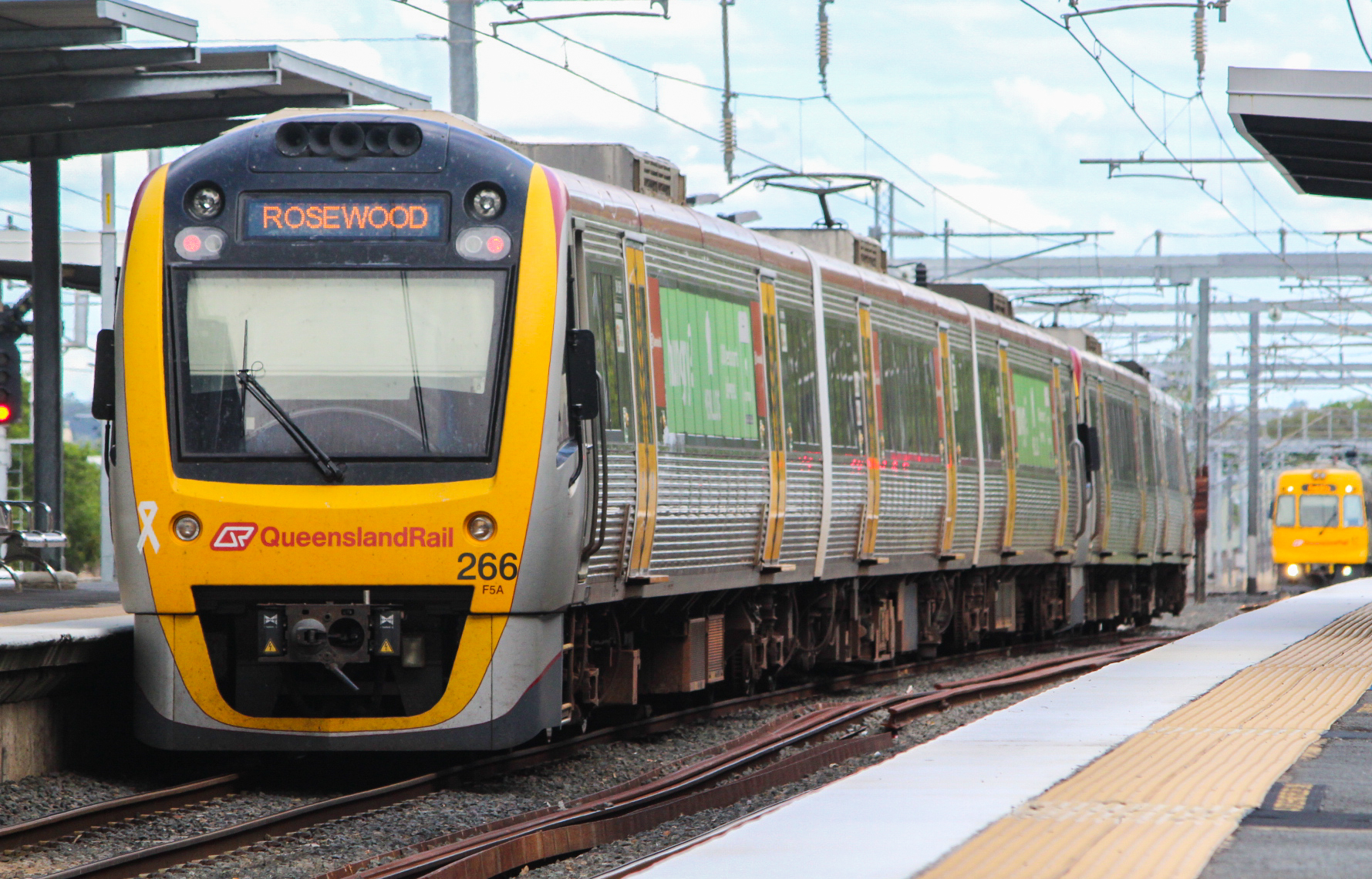
- SMU 266 at Corinda station in April 2017

Overview
- Website: queenslandrail.com.au

Technical
- Track length: 57.0 km (35.4 mi)
- Number of tracks: 4 (Roma Street–Darra); 2 (Darra–Rosewood)
- Track gauge: 1,067 mm (3 ft 6 in)
- Electrification: 1980–1993
- Operating speed: 100 km/h (62 mph)

The T1 Ipswich/Rosewood line is an interurban commuter railway line in South East Queensland. Operated by Queensland Rail, the line runs for 56.2 kilometres (35 miles) from Rosewood to Roma Street, where services continue on the Caboolture and Nambour/Gympie North lines.

== History ==
=== Main Line ===
The Main Line railway from Ipswich to Brisbane was opened in 1876, as part of an extension of the first railway line from Ipswich to Bigge's Camp (now Grandchester) on 31 July 1865.

Originally built as single track, the section was duplicated from 1885 to 1887, indicating how quickly the traffic volume grew on the line. The Albert Bridge was built to accommodate two tracks in 1876, though only one was laid at the time.

The line west of Ipswich was duplicated to Wulkuraka in 1902 and to Grandchester (past Rosewood) in 1913.

The section from Roma Street to Corinda (11 km (6.8 mi) was quadruplicated in 1963, and extended to Darra (a further 5 km (3.1 mi)) in 2011, which became the junction for the first section of the new Springfield line at that time.

The Roma Street–Darra section was the first section electrified in 1979, with the section to Ipswich electrified in 1980.

The line was electrified from Ipswich to Rosewood in 1993 while Minister for Transport was the local member.

On 10 August 2026, the Ipswich/Rosewood line was numbered T1 (along with the Caboolture and Nambour/Gympie North lines) by Translink.

=== Branch lines ===
The Brisbane Valley railway line, branching from the Main Line after Wulkuraka railway station, was opened to Lowood in 1884, Esk in 1886, and Yarraman in 1913. Passenger services operated to Toogoolawah until 1989, and freight services until closure of the line in sections in 1988 and 1993.

A line to Marburg opened in 1912, branching from the Main Line 380 m (1,250 ft) east of Rosewood railway station. It was closed in sections from 1964 to 1995, and some of it is today the Rosewood Railway Museum; the Museum Junction station is at the truncated southern end of the line before Railway Street.

A line to a coal loading balloon loop at Ebenezer was opened in 1990, junctioning from the Main Line west of Thagoona railway station.

The initial section of the Springfield railway line from Darra to Richlands was opened one week early in January 2011 to assist with transportation when the Main Line between Darra and Ipswich was closed due to severe flooding. The Richlands–Springfield section opened in 2013.

A new branch line has been proposed on an alignment extending south from Ipswich to Yamanto, then east to Ripley, and connecting with the Springfield line.

== Network and operations ==
Most services originate in Ipswich and stop at all stations to Bowen Hills. The typical travel time between Ipswich and Brisbane City is approximately 58 minutes (to Central). Rosewood services typically act as a shuttle between Rosewood and Ipswich stations, with selected peak direction services continuing through Ipswich. The typical travel time between Rosewood and Ipswich is 18 minutes.

During weekday peak times, a number of the Ipswich services skip stations between Darra and Milton, stopping only at Indooroopilly for faster travel times for commuters working in the Brisbane central business district.

Passengers for/from the Rosewood line change at Ipswich, Beenleigh, Gold Coast and Cleveland lines at Roma Street, and all other lines at Bowen Hills.

During times of disruption in the inner south of Brisbane, Beenleigh and Gold Coast line trains can be maintained via the Ipswich line, using the Corinda-Yeerongpilly railway line to bypass track closures between South Brisbane and Yeerongpilly.

=== Stations ===
List of T1 Nambour/Gympie North line stations
T1 Ipswich/Rosewood line
Station	Image	Suburb	Opened	Terrain	Connections	Time (Note: Travel time in minutes from Roma Street.)
	Continues from T1 Caboolture and Nambour/Gympie North lines					
Roma Street		Brisbane CBD	14 June 1875	Ground level	Redcliffe Peninsula line Doomben Shorncliffe line Airport line, Brisbane Ferny Grove line Brisbane Metro Bus transport in Queensland	0
Milton		Milton	1884	Ground level	Springfield line Ferry transport in Queensland	3
Auchenflower		Auchenflower	1887	Ground level	Springfield line	5
Toowong		Toowong	1875	Built over	Springfield line	7
Taringa		Taringa	1875	Ground level	Springfield line	10
Indooroopilly		Indooroopilly	1875	Ground level	Springfield line	12
Chelmer		Chelmer	1881	Ground level	Springfield line	14
Graceville		Graceville	1876	Ground level	Springfield line	16
Sherwood		Sherwood	1874	Ground level	Springfield line	18
Corinda		Corinda	1875	Ground level	Springfield line	20
Oxley		Oxley	1874	Ground level	Springfield line	23
Darra		Darra	1874	Ground level	Springfield line	26
Wacol		Wacol	1874	Ground level	none	30
Gailes		Wacol	1919	Ground level	none	33
Goodna		Goodna	1874	Ground level	none	35
Redbank		Redbank	1874	Ground level	none	39
Riverview		Riverview	1875	Ground level	none	42
Dinmore		Dinmore	1884	Ground level	none	45
Ebbw Vale		Ebbw Vale	1874	Ground level	none	47
Bundamba		Bundamba	1874	Ground level	none	49
Booval		Booval	1876	Ground level	none	51
East Ipswich		East Ipswich	1879	Ground level	none	54
Ipswich		Ipswich	1865	Underground	none	56
Thomas Street		Sadliers Crossing	1914	Ground level	none	59
Wulkuraka		Wulkuraka	1884	Ground level	none	62
Karrabin		Karrabin	1865	Ground level	none	65
Walloon		Walloon	1865	Ground level	none	69
Thagoona		Thagoona	1888	Ground level	none	74
Rosewood		Rosewood	31 July 1865	Ground level	none	78

=== Former services ===
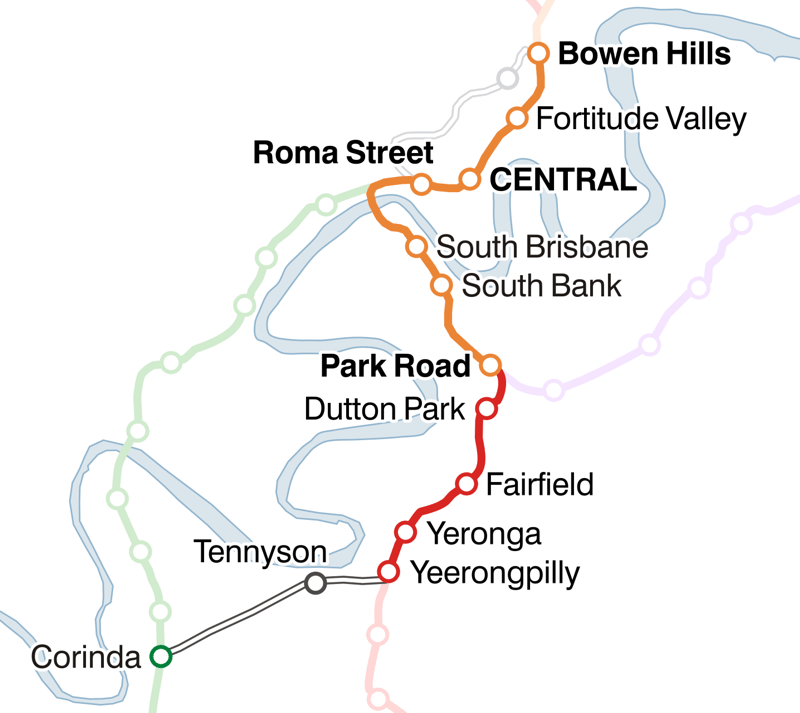
Map of the Corinda via South Brisbane line.

The Corinda–Yeerongpilly railway line, also known as the Tennyson line, connects the Beenleigh and Ipswich lines for coal, grain and intermodal freight services to the Port of Brisbane and Acacia Ridge intermodal terminal. It was the only connection between the northern and southern portions of the Brisbane suburban network until the Merivale Bridge opened in 1978. Commuter services were defunct in 2011 due to low patronage.
