= Mount Marrow, Queensland =

Mount Marrow
- Suburb
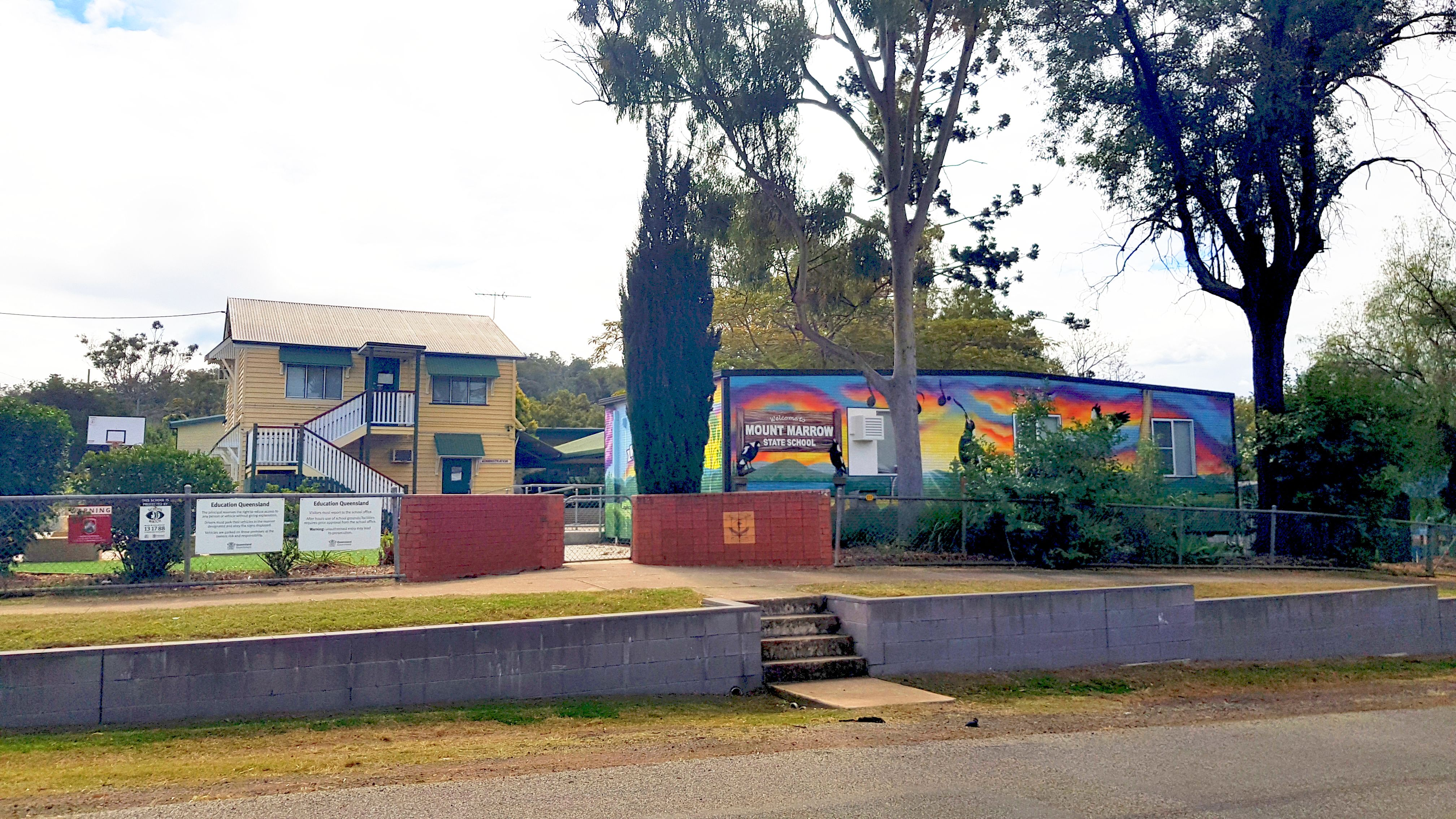
- Mount Marrow State School, 2023

- Interactive map of Mount Marrow
- Coordinates: 27.5977°S 152.6208°E
- Country: Australia
- State: Queensland
- LGA: City of Ipswich
- Location: 5.9 km (3.7 mi) NE of Rosewood; 18.5 km (11.5 mi) W of Ipswich CBD; 58.6 km (36.4 mi) WSW of Brisbane CBD

Government
  - State electorate: Ipswich West
  - Federal division: Blair

Area
  - Total: 8.3 km^{2} (3.2 sq mi)

Population
  - Total: 182 (2021 census)
  - Density: 21.93/km^{2} (56.8/sq mi)
- Time zone: UTC+10:00 (AEST)
- Postcode: 4306
Suburbs around Mount Marrow
Marburg	Haigslea	Haigslea
Tallegalla	Mount Marrow	Walloon
Rosewood	Thagoona	Thagoona

Mount Marrow is a rural locality in the City of Ipswich, Queensland, Australia. In the 2021 census, Mount Marrow had a population of 182 people.

== Geography ==
The locality is 18.5 kilometres (11.5 mi) west of the Ipswich CBD.

The locality takes its name from the mountain Mount Marrow which is in the north of the locality (27.5935°S 152.6195°E) rising to 270 metres (890 ft) above sea level.

There is a quarry at the mountain extracting aggregate for use in roadworks and other construction projects. Apart from the quarry, the predominant land use is grazing on native vegetation.

== History ==
Mount Marrow State School opened on 4 November 1909.

== Demographics ==
In the 2016 census, Mount Marrow had a population of 195 people.

In the 2021 census, Mount Marrow had a population of 182 people.

== Education ==
Mount Marrow State School is a government primary (Prep-6) school for boys and girls at 272 Thagoona-Haigslea Road (27.6036°S 152.6214°E). In 2017, the school had an enrolment of 66 students with 5 teachers (4 full-time equivalent) and 6 non-teaching staff (3 full-time equivalent). In 2018, the school had an enrolment of 65 students with 5 teachers (4 full-time equivalent) and 6 non-teaching staff (3 full-time equivalent).

There are no secondary schools in Mount Marrow. The nearest government secondary school is Rosewood State High School in neighbouring Rosewood to the south-west.
