= Walloon railway station =

Railway station in Queensland, Australia

Walloon
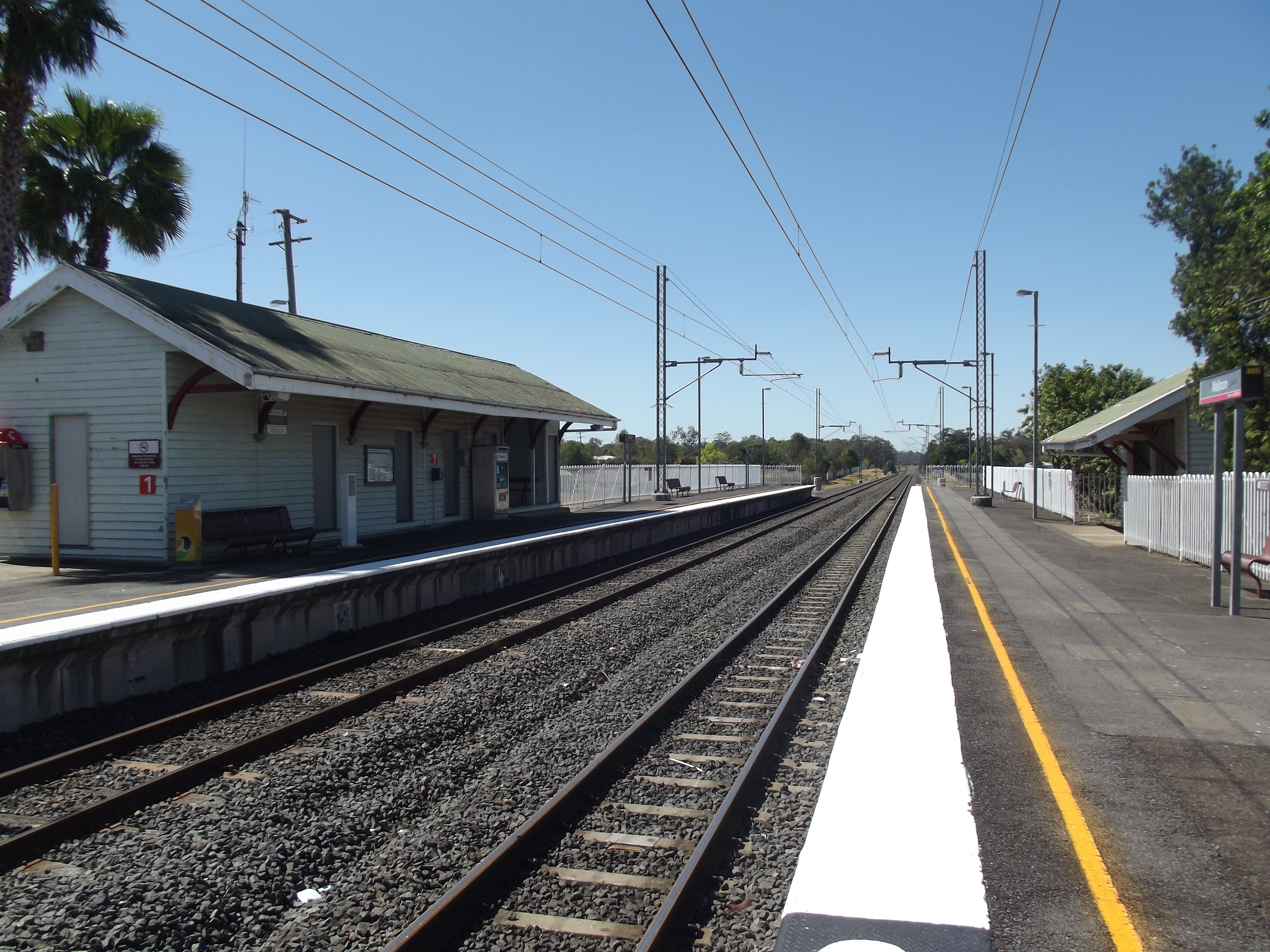
- Eastbound view from Platform 2 in September 2012

General information
- Location: Station Lane, Walloon
- Coordinates: 27°36′26″S 152°40′04″E
- Owner: Queensland Rail
- Operator: Queensland Rail
- Line: T1 Ipswich/Rosewood
- Distance: 48.50 kilometres from Central
- Platforms: 2 side
- Tracks: 2

Construction
- Structure type: Ground
- Parking: 26 bays
- Cycle facilities: Yes

Other information
- Status: Unstaffed
- Station code: 600358 (platform 1); 600359 (platform 2)
- Fare zone: Zone 3
- Website: Queensland Rail

History
- Opened: 31 July 1865
- Rebuilt: 1993

Services
Preceding station	Queensland Rail	Following station
Karrabin towards Caboolture via Roma Street	T1 Ipswich/Rosewood line	Thagoona towards Rosewood
Karrabin towards Ipswich	T1 Ipswich/Rosewood line Rosewood shuttle	Thagoona towards Rosewood
Location

Walloon is a railway station operated by Queensland Rail on the Ipswich/Rosewood line. It opened in 1865 and serves the Ipswich suburb of Walloon. It is a ground level station, featuring two side platforms.

== Services ==
Walloon is served by Citytrain network services from Rosewood to Ipswich. Most services terminate at Ipswich although some peak-hour services continue to Bowen Hills and Caboolture.

== Platforms and services ==
Walloon platform arrangement
Platform	Line	Destination	Notes
1	T1 Ipswich/Rosewood	Rosewood	
2	T1 Ipswich/Rosewood	Roma Street (to Caboolture and Nambour/Gympie North lines)	
