= Jeebropilly, Queensland =

Jeebropilly
- Suburb
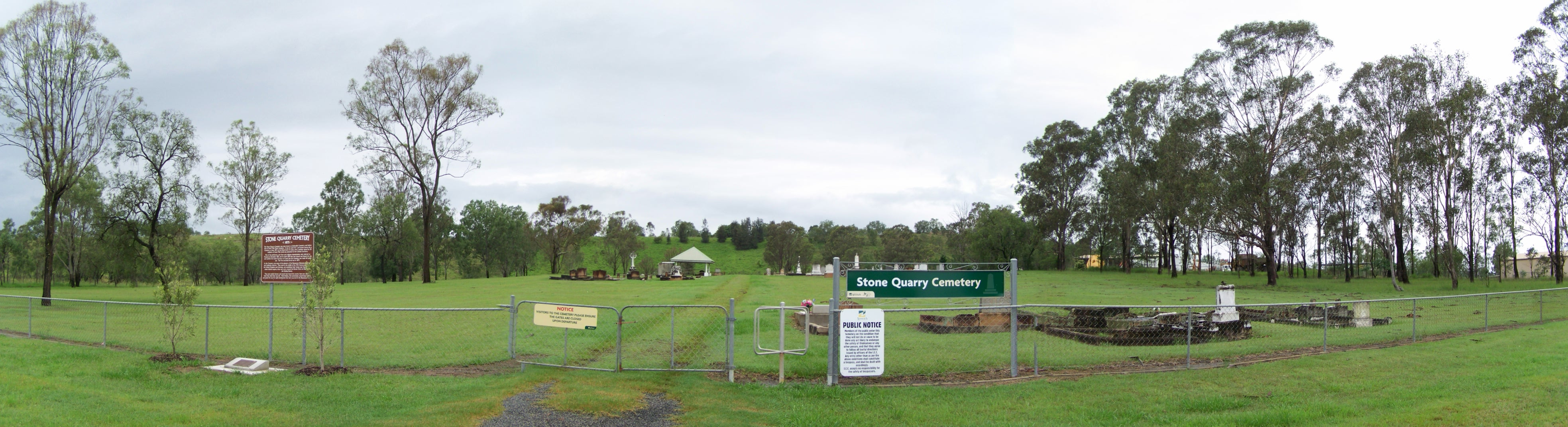
- Stone Quarry Cemetery, 2010

- Interactive map of Jeebropilly
- Coordinates: 27.6491°S 152.6527°E
- Country: Australia
- State: Queensland
- City: Ipswich
- LGA: City of Ipswich
- Location: 11.3 km (7.0 mi) ESE of Rosewood; 17.6 km (10.9 mi) SW of Ipswich CBD; 55.6 km (34.5 mi) SW of Brisbane CBD

Government
  - State electorate: Scenic Rim
  - Federal division: Blair

Area
  - Total: 11.7 km^{2} (4.5 sq mi)

Population
  - Total: 0 (2021 census)
  - Density: 0.00/km^{2} (0.00/sq mi)
- Time zone: UTC+10:00 (AEST)
- Postcode: 4340
Suburbs around Jeebropilly
| Thagoona | Walloon | Amberley |
| Rosewood | Jeebropilly | Amberley |
| Ebenezer | Ebenezer | Willowbank |

Jeebropilly (formerly known as Stone Quarry) is a rural locality in the City of Ipswich, Queensland, Australia. In the 2021 census, Jeebropilly had "no people or a very low population".

== Geography ==
The locality is bounded to the west and north by the Bremer River.

The locality is bounded to the south-west and south by the Yarrowlea–Ebenezer railway line, a branch line of the Main Line railway, which serves the Jeebropilly coal mine that exports coal via the Port of Brisbane. Despite the name, Ebenezer railway station is off Coopers Road in Jeebropilly (27.6659°S 152.6546°E), just before the balloon loop at the end of the line.

== History ==
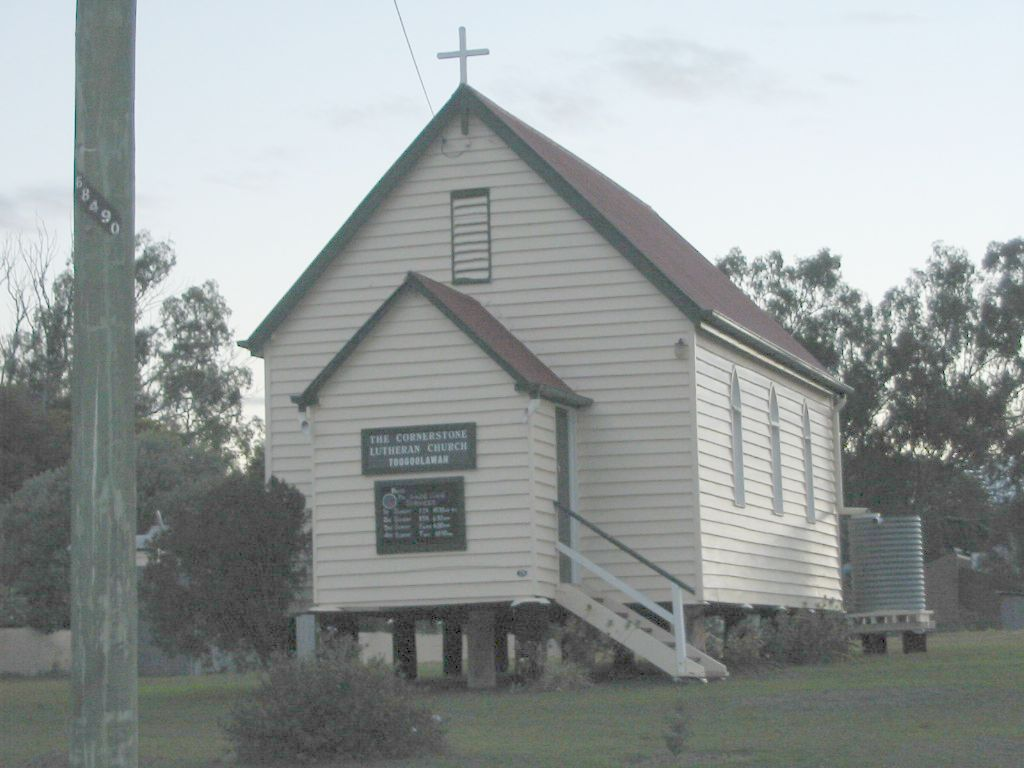
The former Bethlehem Lutheran Church in its new location in Toogoolawah, 2005

The origin of the name is from the Ugarapul word meaning flying squirrel gully.

Bethlehem Lutheran Church opened on 19 April 1871. A new church was built on 20 April 1898. The church closed circa 1938. It was on a 2-acre (0.81 ha) land parcel (Lot/Plan 307CH31367) now within a mine site (27.66072°S 152.66050°E). In 1940, the church building was relocated to Toogoolawah to reopen as the Cornerstone Lutheran Church.

The Yarrowlea–Ebenezer railway line opened on 1 February 1990.

== Demographics ==
In the 2016 census, Jeebropilly had a population of 7 people.

In the 2021 census, Jeebropilly had "no people or a very low population".

== Economy ==
New Hope Corporation Ltd operated the Jeebropilly coal mine from 1982-2007 and 2008-2019.

== Education ==
There are no schools in Jeebropilly. The nearest government primary schools are Rosewood State School in neighbouring Rosewood to the west, Walloon State School in neighbouring Walloon to the north, and Amberley District State School in Yamanto to the east. The nearest government secondary schools are Rosewood State High School in neighbouring Rosewood to the west and Bremer State High School in Ipswich CBD to the east.

== Facilities ==
Mcgearys Road Reserve is park (27.6481°S 152.6368°E).

Stone Quarry Cemetery (also known as Jeerbropilly General Cemetery) is a cemetery (27.6504°S 152.6589°E).
