= Karrabin railway station =

Railway station in Queensland, Australia

Karrabin
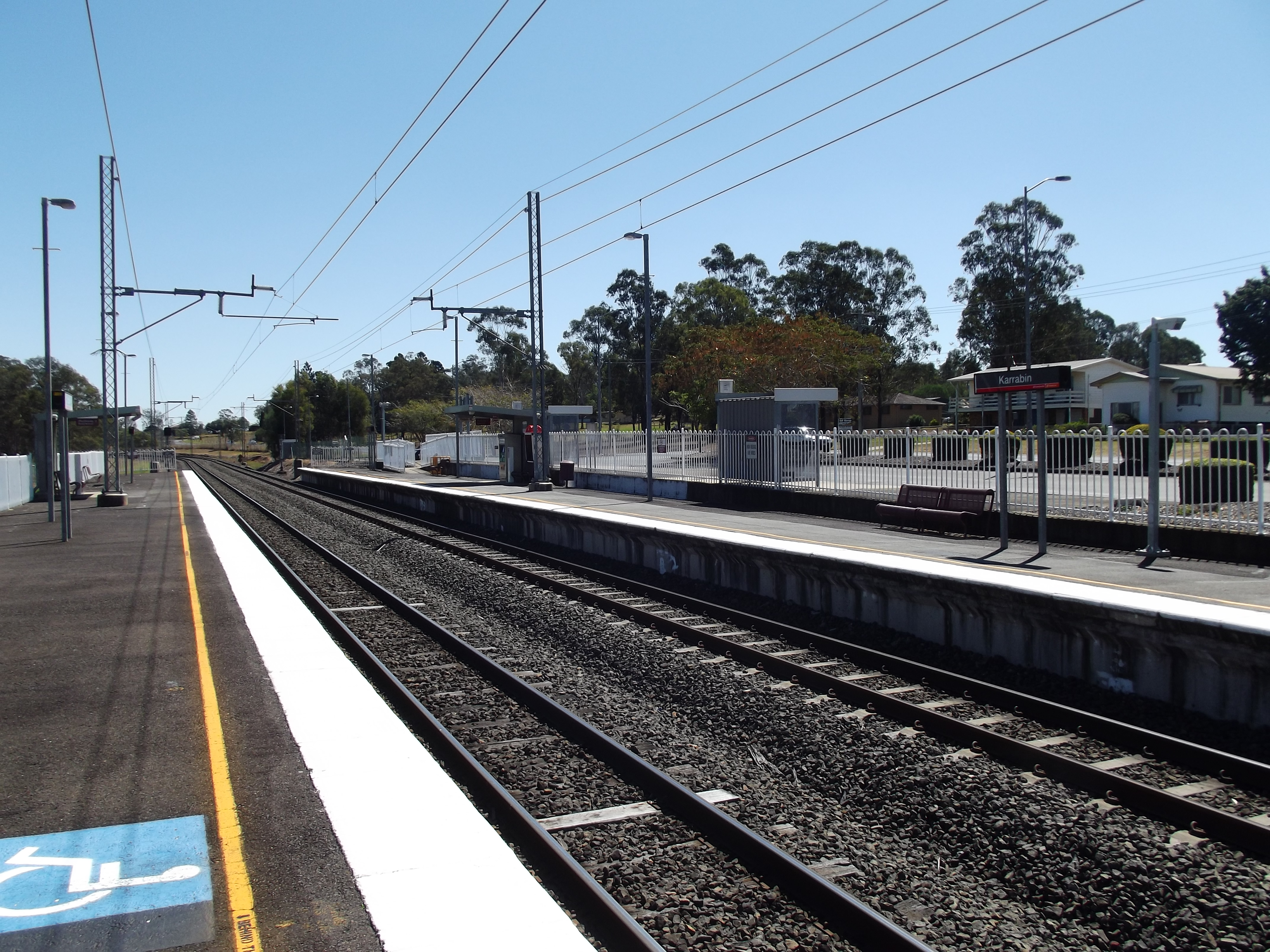
- Westbound view from Platform 1 in September 2012

General information
- Location: Karrabin-Rosewood Road, Karrabin
- Coordinates: 27°36′16″S 152°42′33″E
- Owner: Queensland Rail
- Operator: Queensland Rail
- Line: T1 Ipswich/Rosewood
- Distance: 43.89 kilometres from Central
- Platforms: 2 side
- Tracks: 2

Construction
- Structure type: Ground
- Parking: 26 bays

Other information
- Status: Unstaffed
- Station code: 600355 (platform 1); 600356 (platform 2)
- Fare zone: go card 3
- Website: Queensland Rail

History
- Opened: 1865
- Rebuilt: 1993

Services
Preceding station	Queensland Rail	Following station
Wulkuraka towards Caboolture via Roma Street	T1 Ipswich/Rosewood line	Walloon towards Rosewood
Wulkuraka towards Ipswich	T1 Ipswich/Rosewood line Rosewood shuttle	Walloon towards Rosewood
Location

Karrabin is a railway station operated by Queensland Rail on the Ipswich/Rosewood line. It opened in 1865 and serves the Ipswich suburb of Karrabin. It is a ground level station, featuring two side platforms.

== Services ==
Karrabin is served by Citytrain network services from Rosewood to Ipswich. Most services terminate at Ipswich although some peak-hour services continue to Bowen Hills and Caboolture.

== Platforms and services ==
Karrabin platform arrangement
Platform	Line	Destination	Notes
1	T1 Ipswich/Rosewood	Rosewood	
2	T1 Ipswich/Rosewood	Roma Street (to Caboolture and Nambour/Gympie North lines)	
