= Wacol railway station =

Railway station in Queensland, Australia

Wacol
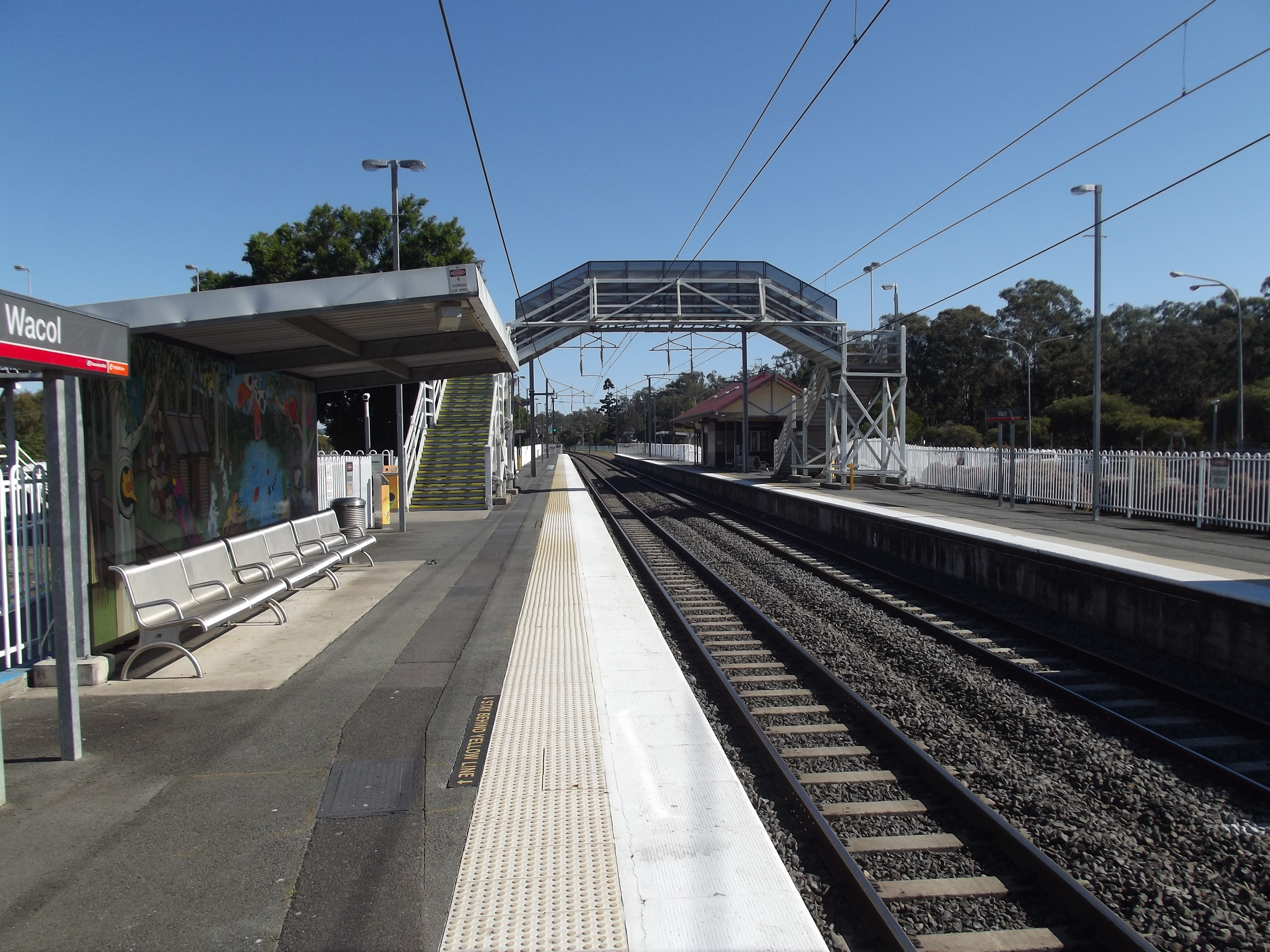
- Southbound view from Platform 1 in September 2012

General information
- Location: Wilruna Street, Wacol
- Coordinates: 27.5887°S 152.9246°E
- Owner: Queensland Rail
- Operator: Queensland Rail
- Line: T1 Ipswich/Rosewood
- Distance: 19.97 kilometres from Central
- Platforms: 2 side
- Tracks: 2

Construction
- Structure type: Ground
- Parking: 262 bays

Other information
- Status: Staffed
- Station code: 600327 (platform 1); 600328 (platform 2)
- Fare zone: Zone 2
- Website: Translink

History
- Opened: 8 October 1874; 151 years ago
- Former names: Wolston

Services
Preceding station	Queensland Rail	Following station
Darra towards Caboolture via Roma Street	T1 Ipswich/Rosewood line	Gailes towards Ipswich or Rosewood
Location

Wacol is a railway station operated by Queensland Rail on the Ipswich/Rosewood line. It opened in 1874 and serves the Brisbane suburb of Wacol. It is a ground level station, featuring two side platforms.

== History ==
The Wolston railway station was opened on 8 October 1874, taking its name from nearby Wolston House. However, the name caused confusion with the Wilston railway station, so it was renamed on 8 July 1927 to Wacol railway station. Wacol is a coined word from weigh coal, as the principal purpose of the station was coal handling.

In 1998, the timber station building was replaced. In 2011, bright murals depicting domestic wildlife, forests and farmlands were painted on the walls of platforms buildings. The animal theme was chosen because the RSPCA Animal Care Campus moved to Wacol in December 2011.

== Platforms and services ==
Wacol is served by trains operating to and from Ipswich and Rosewood. Most city-bound services run to Caboolture and Nambour, with some morning peak trains terminating at Bowen Hills. Some afternoon inbound services on weekdays run to Kippa-Ring. Wacol is 25 minutes from Ipswich and 31 minutes on an all-stops train from Central.

Wacol platform arrangement
Platform	Line	Destination	Notes
1	T1 Ipswich/Rosewood	Ipswich or Rosewood	
2	T1 Ipswich/Rosewood	Roma Street (to Caboolture and Nambour/Gympie North lines)	
