= Thomas Street railway station =

Railway station in Queensland, Australia

Thomas Street
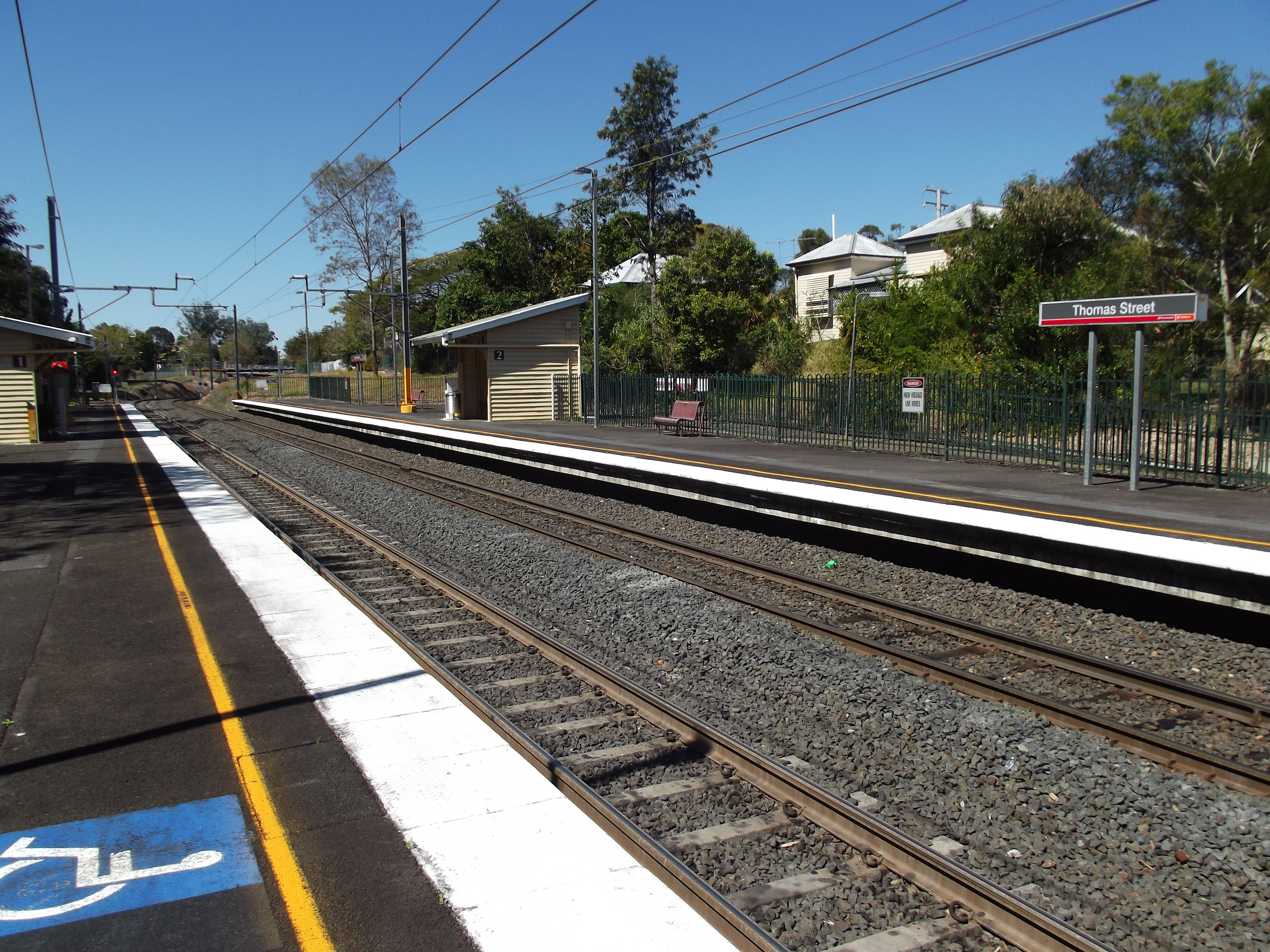
- Westbound view from Platform 1 in September 2012

General information
- Location: Tallon Street, Sadliers Crossing
- Coordinates: 27°36′53″S 152°44′44″E
- Owner: Queensland Rail
- Operator: Queensland Rail
- Line: T1 Ipswich/Rosewood
- Distance: 40.09 kilometres from Central
- Platforms: 2 side
- Tracks: 2

Construction
- Structure type: Ground

Other information
- Status: Unstaffed
- Station code: 600351 (platform 1); 600352 (platform 2)
- Fare zone: Zone 3
- Website: Queensland Rail

History
- Opened: 20 April 1914
- Rebuilt: 1993

Services
Preceding station	Queensland Rail	Following station
Ipswich towards Caboolture via Roma Street	T1 Ipswich/Rosewood line	Wulkuraka towards Rosewood
Ipswich Terminus	T1 Ipswich/Rosewood line Rosewood shuttle	Wulkuraka towards Rosewood
Location

Thomas Street is a railway station operated by Queensland Rail on the Ipswich/Rosewood line. It opened in 1914 and serves the Ipswich suburb of Sadliers Crossing. It is a ground level station, featuring two side platforms.

== History ==
The station was approved in 1913, and opened for traffic on 20 April 1914.

== Services ==
Thomas Street is served by Citytrain network services from Rosewood to Ipswich. Most services terminate at Ipswich although some peak-hour services continue to Bowen Hills and Caboolture.

== Platforms and services ==
Thomas Street platform arrangement
Platform	Line	Destination	Notes
1	T1 Ipswich/Rosewood	Rosewood	
2	T1 Ipswich/Rosewood	Roma Street (to Caboolture and Nambour/Gympie North lines)	
