= Thagoona railway station =

Railway station in Queensland, Australia

Thagoona
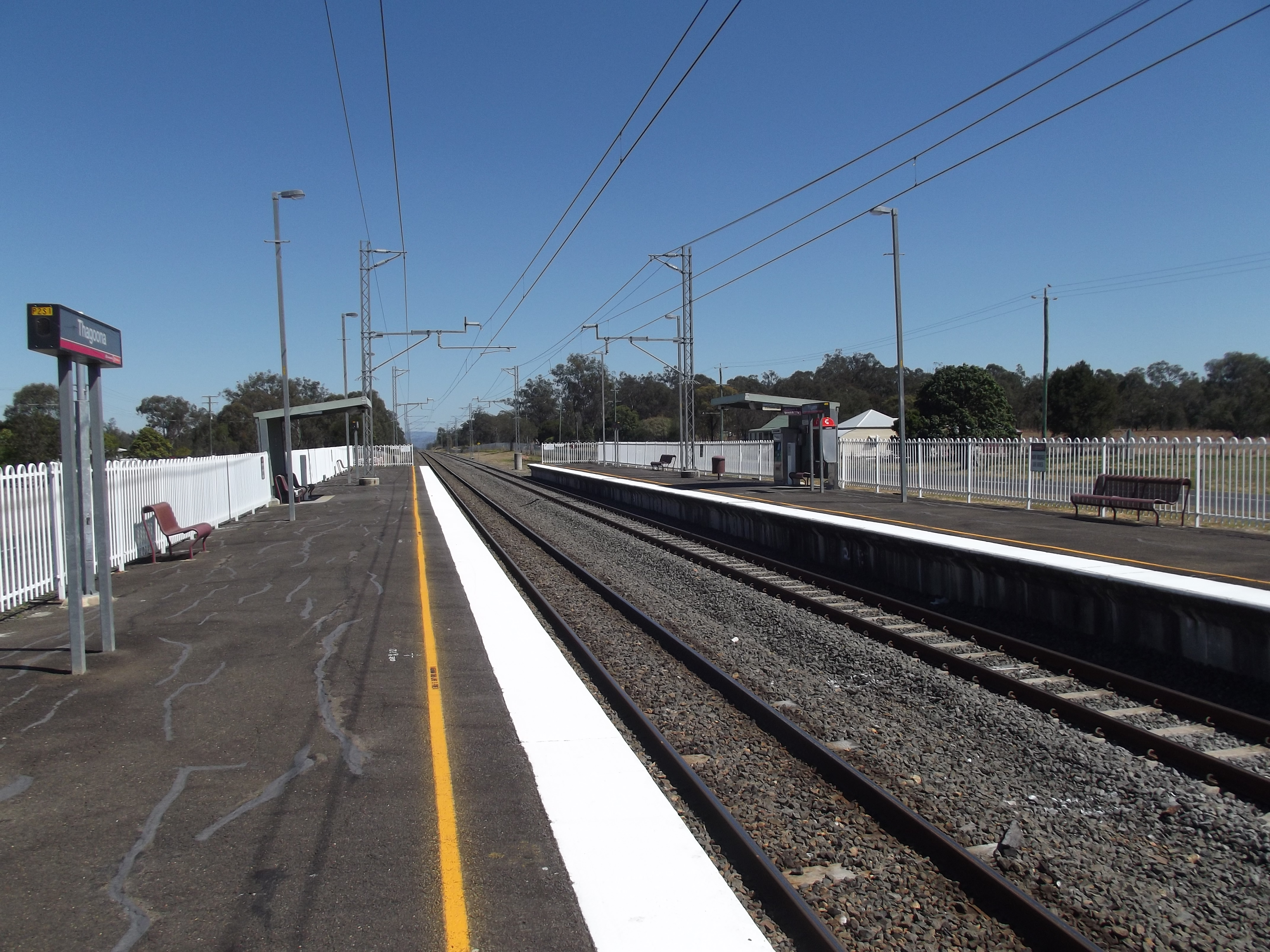
- South-west bound view from Platform 1 in September 2012

General information
- Location: Thagoona-Rosewood Road, Thagoona
- Coordinates: 27°37′36″S 152°37′47″E
- Owner: Queensland Rail
- Operator: Queensland Rail
- Line: T1 Ipswich/Rosewood
- Distance: 52.71 kilometres from Central
- Platforms: 2 side
- Tracks: 2

Construction
- Structure type: Ground

Other information
- Status: Unstaffed
- Station code: 600360 (platform 1); 600361 (platform 2)
- Fare zone: Zone 4
- Website: Queensland Rail

History
- Opened: 1888
- Rebuilt: 1993
- Former names: Raeside

Services
Preceding station	Queensland Rail	Following station
Walloon towards Caboolture via Roma Street	T1 Ipswich/Rosewood line	Rosewood Terminus
Walloon towards Ipswich	T1 Ipswich/Rosewood line Rosewood shuttle	Rosewood Terminus
Location

Thagoona is a railway station operated by Queensland Rail on the Ipswich/Rosewood line. It opened in 1888 and serves the Ipswich suburb of Thagoona. It is a ground level station, featuring two side platforms.

== History ==
The station opened in 1888 as Raeside, being renamed Thagoona shortly afterwards.

== Services ==
Thagoona is served by Citytrain network services from Rosewood to Ipswich. Most services terminate at Ipswich although some peak-hour services continue to Bowen Hills and Caboolture.

== Platforms and services ==
Thagoona platform arrangement
Platform	Line	Destination	Notes
1	T1 Ipswich/Rosewood	Rosewood	
2	T1 Ipswich/Rosewood	Roma Street (to Caboolture and Nambour/Gympie North lines)	
