= Wulkuraka railway station =

Railway station in Queensland, Australia

Wulkuraka
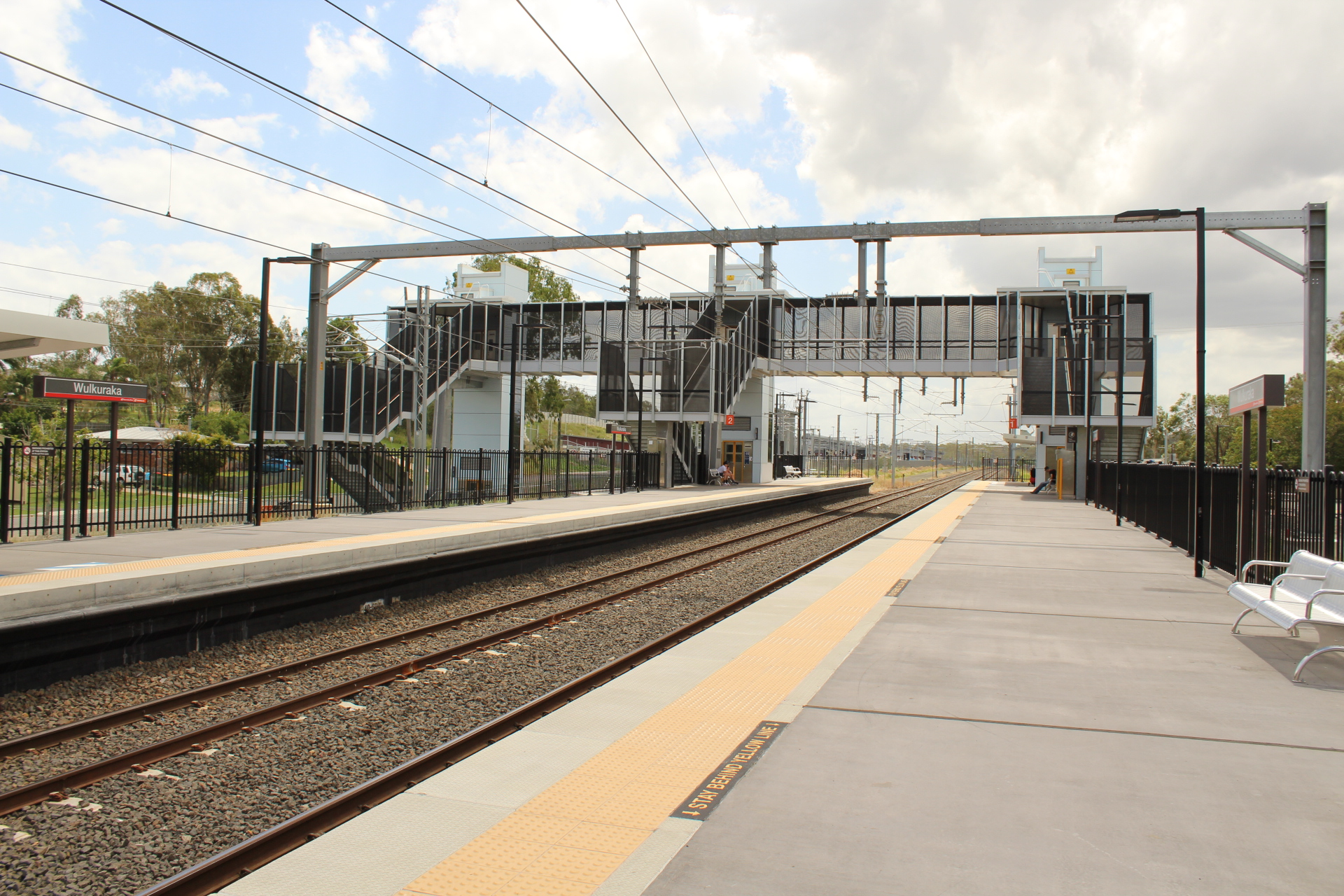
- Westbound view from Platform 2 in December 2016

General information
- Location: Grace Street, Wulkuraka
- Coordinates: 27°36′49″S 152°43′58″E
- Owner: Queensland Rail
- Operator: Queensland Rail
- Line: T1 Ipswich/Rosewood
- Distance: 41.57 kilometres from Central
- Platforms: 2 side
- Tracks: 2

Construction
- Structure type: Ground
- Parking: 20 bays

Other information
- Status: Unstaffed
- Station code: 600353 (platform 1); 600354 (platform 2)
- Fare zone: Zone 3
- Website: Queensland Rail

History
- Opened: 1884; 142 years ago
- Rebuilt: 1993, 2015
- Former names: Brisbane Valley Junction

Services
Preceding station	Queensland Rail	Following station
Thomas Street towards Caboolture via Roma Street	T1 Ipswich/Rosewood line	Karrabin towards Rosewood
Thomas Street towards Ipswich	T1 Ipswich/Rosewood line Rosewood shuttle	Karrabin towards Rosewood
Location

Wulkuraka is a railway station operated by Queensland Rail on the Ipswich/Rosewood line. It opened in 1884 and serves the Ipswich suburb of Wulkuraka. It is a ground level station, featuring two side platforms.

== History ==
Wulkuraka station opened as Brisbane Valley Junction in the 1880s, being the junction station for the Brisbane Valley railway line from 1884 until 1989. It was renamed Wulkuraka in 1905. The station has undergone an extensive refurbishment in conjunction with the construction of the New Generation Rollingstock depot, west of the station.

== Sadliers Crossing Railway Bridge ==
The Sadliers Crossing Railway Bridge is a heritage-listed truss bridge built in 1902 to the east of Wulkuraka station across the Bremer River.

== Depot ==
A maintenance depot for the New Generation Rollingstock trains lies west of the station.

== Services ==
Wulkuraka is served by Citytrain network services from Rosewood to Ipswich. Most services terminate at Ipswich although some peak-hour services continue to Bowen Hills and Caboolture.

== Platforms and services ==
Wulkuraka platform arrangement
Platform	Line	Destination	Notes
1	T1 Ipswich/Rosewood	Rosewood	
2	T1 Ipswich/Rosewood	Roma Street (to Caboolture and Nambour/Gympie North lines)	
