= Borallon Correctional Centre =

Prison in Queensland, Australia

Borallon Training and Correctional Centre
- Location in Queensland
- Location: Ironbark, City of Ipswich, Queensland, Australia; 27°32′59.84″S 152°40′29.14″E
- Status: Open
- Security class: High
- Capacity: 492
- Opened: 1990; Re-opened on 11 April 2016
- Closed: January 2012
- Managed by: Queensland Corrective Services

Borallon Training and Correctional Centre is an Australian prison. Despite its name, it is not located in Borallon but on Ivan Lane, Ironbark, City of Ipswich, Queensland, Australia, approximately 15 minutes from Ipswich. When first opened as Borallon Correctional Centre, it was the first private correctional facility operated in Australia. It had a capacity of 492 prisoners. The centre reopened as Borallon Training and Correctional Centre in 2016.

The prison houses a library and gym.

== History ==
Whilst the prison buildings, equipment and land are owned by the Queensland Department of Corrective Services, Borallon Correctional Centre was originally operated by Corrections Company of Australia (which was in turned owned by Wormald International, Corrections Corporation of America and John Holland Group). It opened on 2 January 1990. In September 2007, Serco Australia won the bid to take over management at the prison. The facility cost $22 million to construct.

The management company was responsible for the day-to-day running of the centre, financial management and the hiring of staff, within the bounds laid down by the Corrective Services Act 2000. Whilst they were not public servants, staff employed at Borallon Correctional Centre had the same powers and responsibilities as government prison counterparts with respect to the management of prisoners and are offered the same access to Departmental training as their government colleagues; the only exception was Custodial Officer training which was conducted in-house. Employees couldn't transfer to another prison nor receive public service benefits. Prisoners within Borallon Correctional Centre could work or take courses to correct their behavior. They could also complete schooling, TAFE and university studies.

The contract to manage Borallon Correctional Centre was subject to tender between February and May 2007, with GEO, MTC, GSL and Serco selected as bidders. On 4 September 2007, Serco was selected as preferred bidder.

Borallon Correctional Centre was decommissioned in early 2012, in conjunction with the opening of the new Southern Queensland Correctional Centre. The final date for visits to prisoners was on 22 January 2012.

Borallon re-opened on 11 April 2016 as Borallon Training and Correctional Centre promoted as Queensland's first dedicated training prison, with a focus on education, training and employment outcomes. Prisoners can undertake 50 TAFE courses and complete certificates, under an "earn and learn" system.

Borallon has different types of cells, including 95 'residential' cells and 153 'secure' cells. A further 244 cells require major changes to meet current standards due to recognised "hanging points".

Borallon opened 100 new cells in 2018, to make way for an influx of prisoners from Southern Queensland Correctional Centre which was turned into a women's prison.

== See also ==
- List of Australian prisons
- Punishment in Australia
