= Ebenezer, Queensland =

Ebenezer
- Suburb
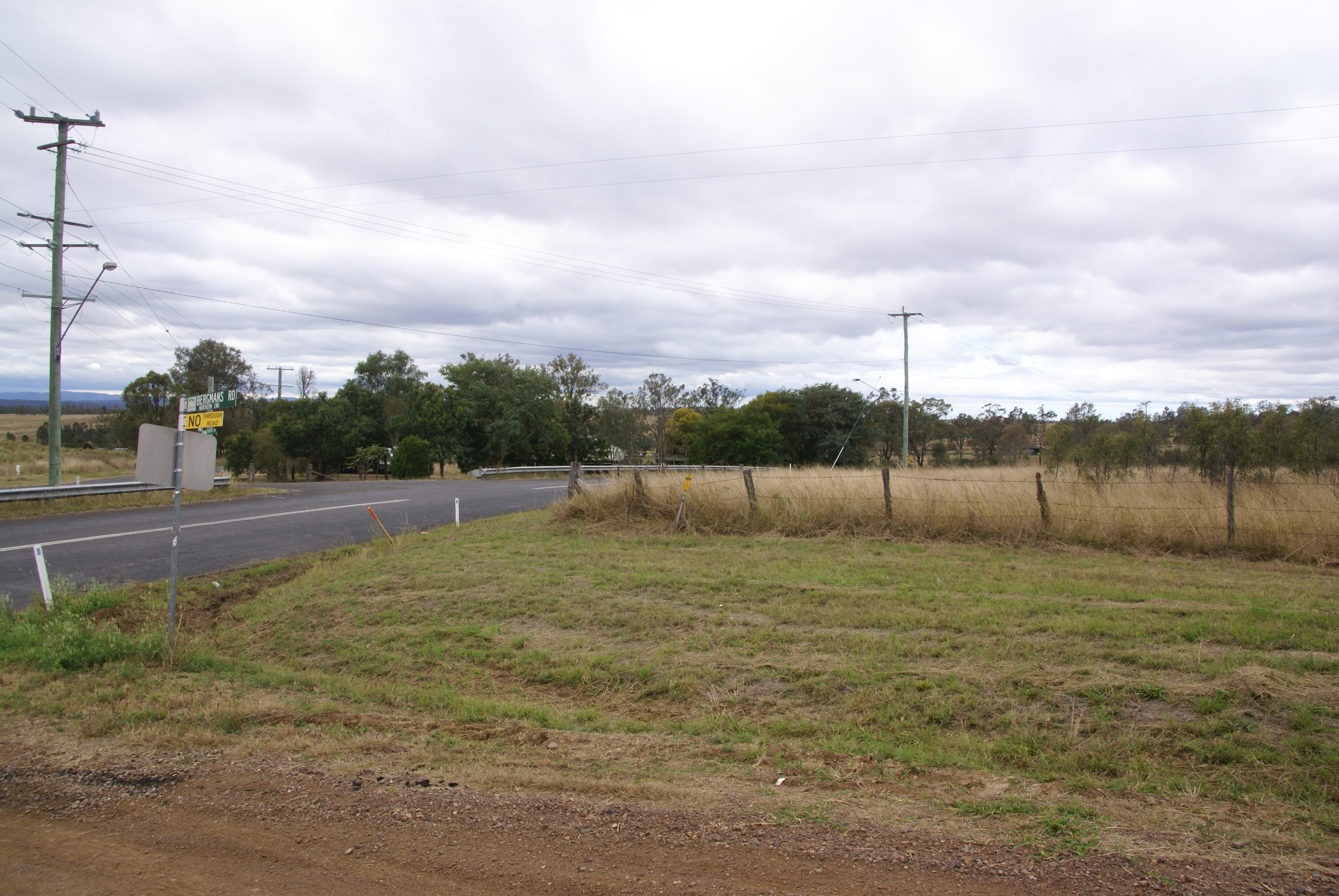
- Ebenezer landscape, 2010

- Coordinates: 27.6780°S 152.6152°E
- Country: Australia
- State: Queensland
- City: Ipswich
- LGA: City of Ipswich
- Location: 7.6 km (4.7 mi) SSE of Rosewood; 22.6 km (14.0 mi) WSW of Ipswich CBD; 61.5 km (38.2 mi) WSW of Brisbane CBD

Government
  - State electorate: Scenic Rim
  - Federal division: Blair

Area
  - Total: 31.8 km^{2} (12.3 sq mi)

Population
  - Total: 301 (2021 census)
  - Density: 9.465/km^{2} (24.52/sq mi)
- Time zone: UTC+10:00 (AEST)
- Postcode: 4340
Suburbs around Ebenezer
Rosewood	Rosewood	Jeebropilly
Lower Mount Walker	Ebenezer	Willowbank
Lower Mount Walker	Mount Forbes	Mount Forbes

Ebenezer is a rural locality in the City of Ipswich, Queensland, Australia. In the 2021 census, Ebenezer had a population of 301 people.

== Geography ==
The locality is bounded to the north-west by the Bremer River and to north-east by the Yarrowlea-Jeebropilly railway line (a branch line off the Main Line railway). Despite the name, Ebenezer railway station is off Coopers Road in neighbouring Jeebropilly (27.6659°S 152.6546°E), just before the balloon loop at the end of the line.

In the west of the locality is a former coal mine. The rehabilitation of the site has been controversial.

Geiger Lagoon (27.6602°S 152.6291°E) is a lake created from the 22-hectare (54-acre) site of the Jeebropilly West open-cut mine, which closed in 2001. The lagoon is named after the Geiger family, who were pioneer settlers from 1857 in the area.

Keanes Lagoon is a waterhole (27.6608°S 152.6083°E). It is named after the land owner John Richard Keane (1846-1927).

Apart from this the land use is a mix of rural residential living (mostly around Ebenezer Road and Mount Forbes Road) and grazing on native vegetation.

== History ==
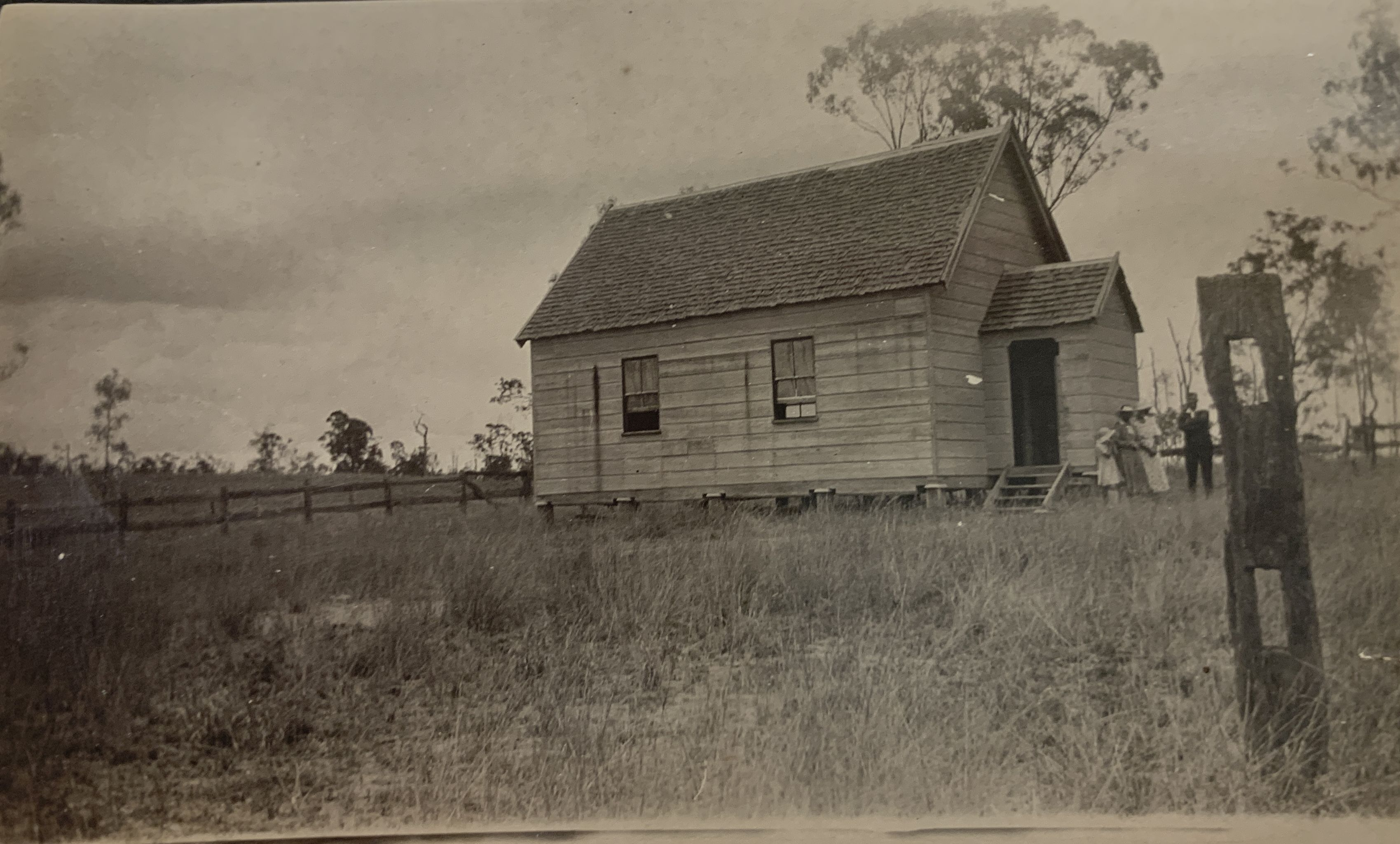
Ebenezer Methodist Church, circa 1905

Seven Mile Creek State School opened on 2 November 1868. In 1888 it was renamed Ebenezer State School. It closed in 1957. It was located at 354-356 Ebenezer Road (opposite the junction with Turnbull Road, 27.66958°S 152.62701°E).

The locality takes its name from the Ebenezer Wesleyan (later Methodist) Church which opened on Sunday 23 April 1871 at Seven Mile Creek. Ebenezer is from a Hebrew word meaning rock of faith. It was opposite the school at 1 Turnbull Road (corner of Ebenezer Road, 27.6700°S 152.6277°E). Now demolished, the church operated until at least 1942.

== Demographics ==
In the 2011 census, Ebenezer had a population of 386 people.

In the 2016 census, Ebenezer had a population of 315 people.

In the 2021 census, Ebenezer had a population of 301 people.

== Education ==
There are no schools in Ebenezer. The nearest government primary schools are Rosewood State School in neighbouring Rosewood to the north-west and Mutdapilly State School in Mutdapilly to the south-east. The nearest government secondary school is Rosewood State High School in Rosewood.
