= Thagoona, Queensland =

Thagoona
- Suburb
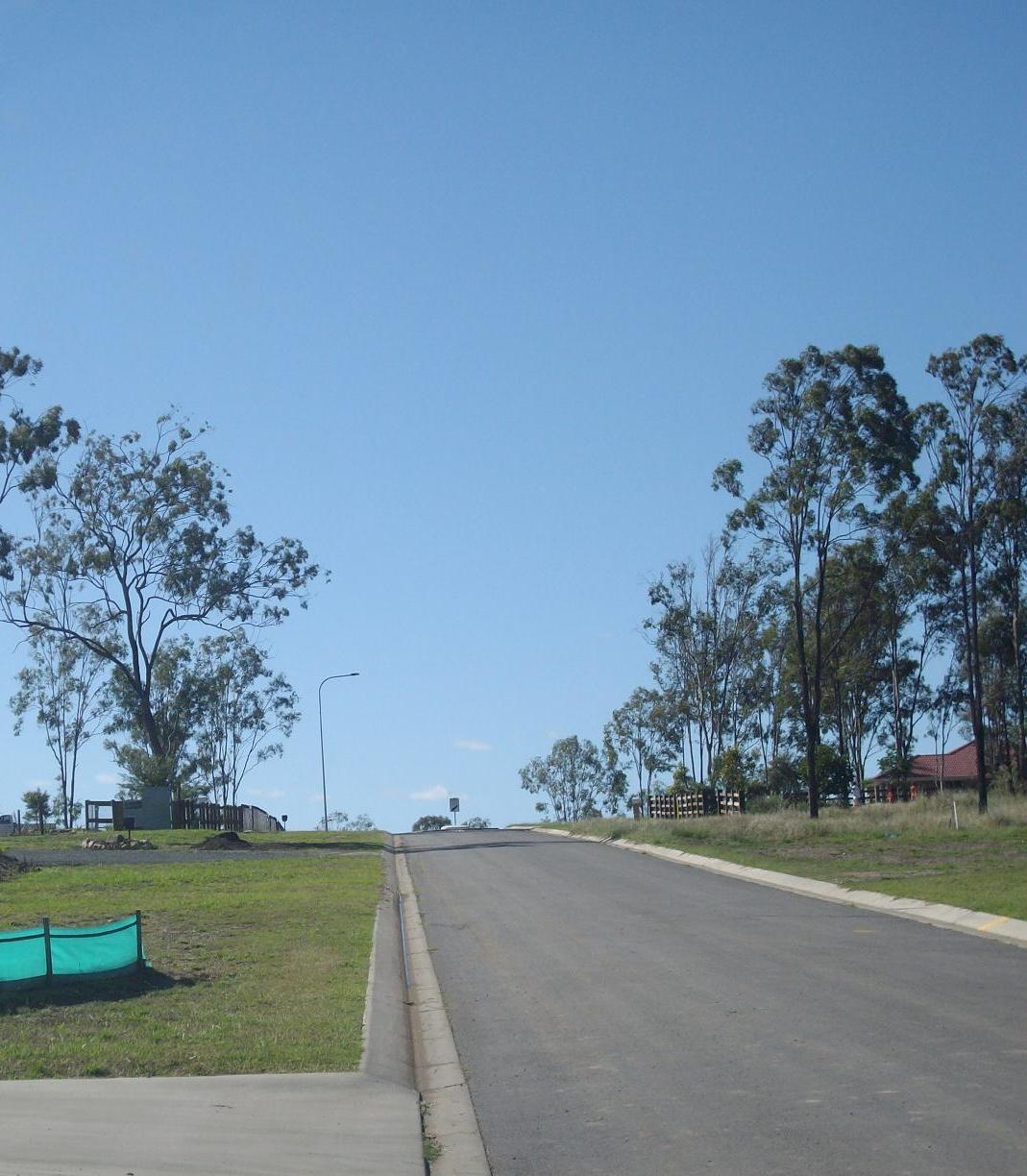

- Interactive map of Thagoona
- Coordinates: 27.6269°S 152.6313°E
- Country: Australia
- State: Queensland
- City: Ipswich
- LGA: City of Ipswich
- Location: 4.9 km (3.0 mi) ENE of Rosewood; 15.6 km (9.7 mi) W of Ipswich CBD; 54.6 km (33.9 mi) SW of Brisbane CBD

Government
  - State electorate: Ipswich West
  - Federal division: Blair

Area
  - Total: 13.2 km^{2} (5.1 sq mi)

Population
  - Total: 1,077 (2021 census)
  - Density: 81.6/km^{2} (211.3/sq mi)
- Time zone: UTC+10:00 (AEST)
- Postcode: 4306
Suburbs around Thagoona
Rosewood	Mount Marrow	Walloon
Rosewood	Thagoona	Walloon
Rosewood	Jeebropilly	Jeebropilly

Thagoona is a mixed-use locality in the City of Ipswich, Queensland, Australia. In the 2021 census, Thagoona had a population of 1,077 people.

== Geography ==
The locality is bounded to the south-east by the Bremer River. The Rosewood railway line enters the locality from the east (Walloon) and exits to the west (Rosewood) with the locality served by the Thagoona railway station (27.6268°S 152.6298°E).

The land use is a mix of rural residential (mostly to the immediate north of the railway line) and grazing on native vegetation.

== Demographics ==
In the 2006 census, Thagoona had a population of 1,639 people.

In the 2011 census, Thagoona had a population of 972 people.

In the 2016 census, Thagoona had a population of 1,025 people.

In the 2021 census, Thagoona had a population of 1,077 people.

== Education ==
There are no schools in Thagoona. The nearest government primary schools are Mount Marrow State School in neighbouring Mount Marrow to the north, Walloon State School in neighbouring Walloon to the east, and Rosewood State School in neighbouring Rosewood to the west. The nearest government secondary school is Rosewood State High School in Rosewood to the west.

== Amenities ==
Despite the name, Rosewood Seventh-Day Adventist Church is at 3 Karrabin Rosewood Road in Thagoona (27.6217°S 152.6143°E).

There are a number of parks in the area:

- Adelong Avenue Reserve (27.6201°S 152.6417°E)
- Armstrong Park (27.6483°S 152.6316°E)
- Banyula Road Reserve (27.6177°S 152.6398°E)
- Caledonian Park (27.6208°S 152.6324°E)
- Evans Road Reserve (27.6141°S 152.6476°E)
- Karrabin-rosewood Road Reserve (27.6147°S 152.6367°E)
- Pindari Drive Reserve (27.6094°S 152.6427°E)

== Transport ==
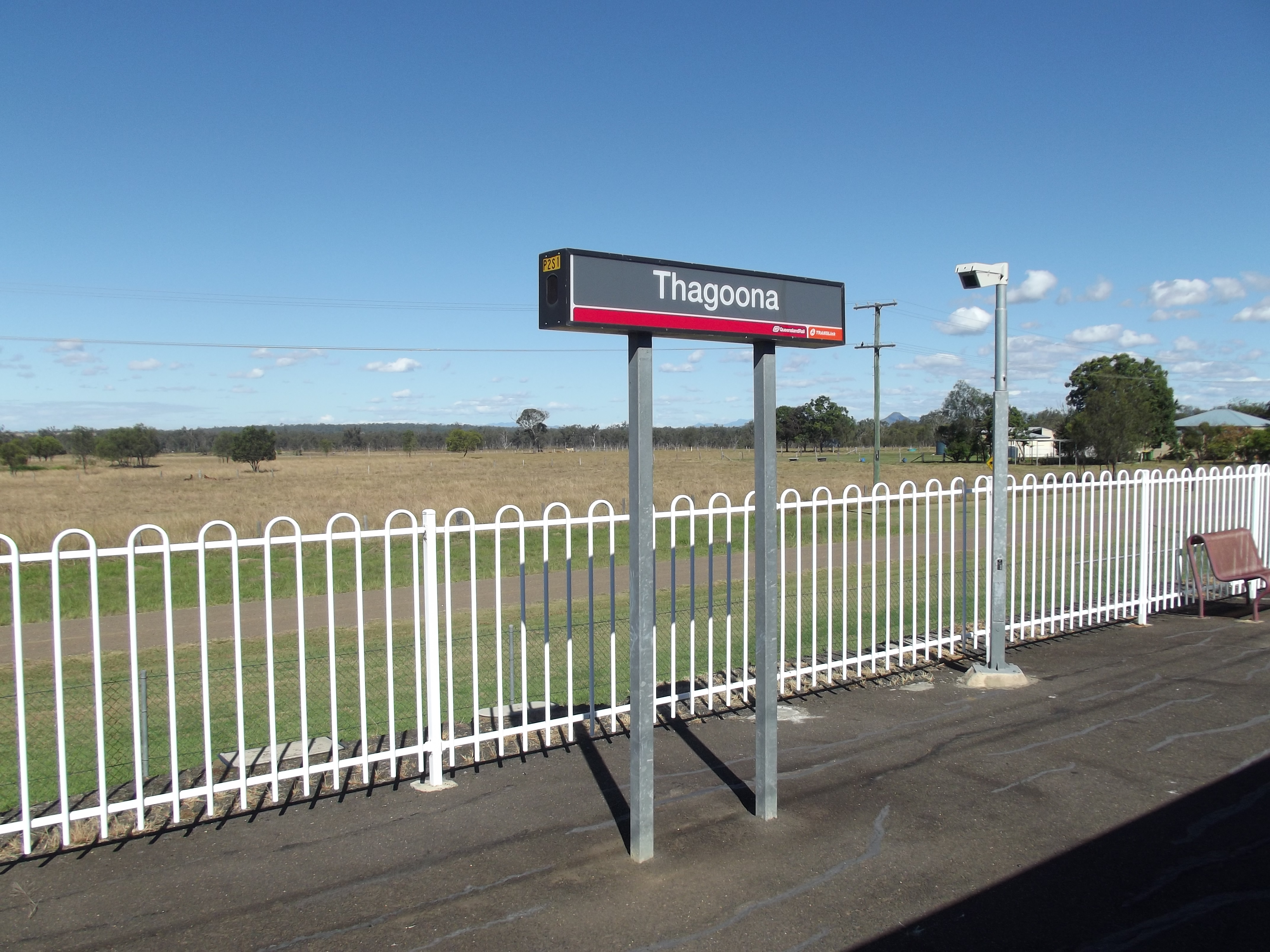
Thagoona railway station, 2012

Thagoona railway station provides Queensland Rail City network services to Rosewood, Ipswich and Brisbane via Ipswich.
