= Walloon, Queensland =

Walloon
- Town
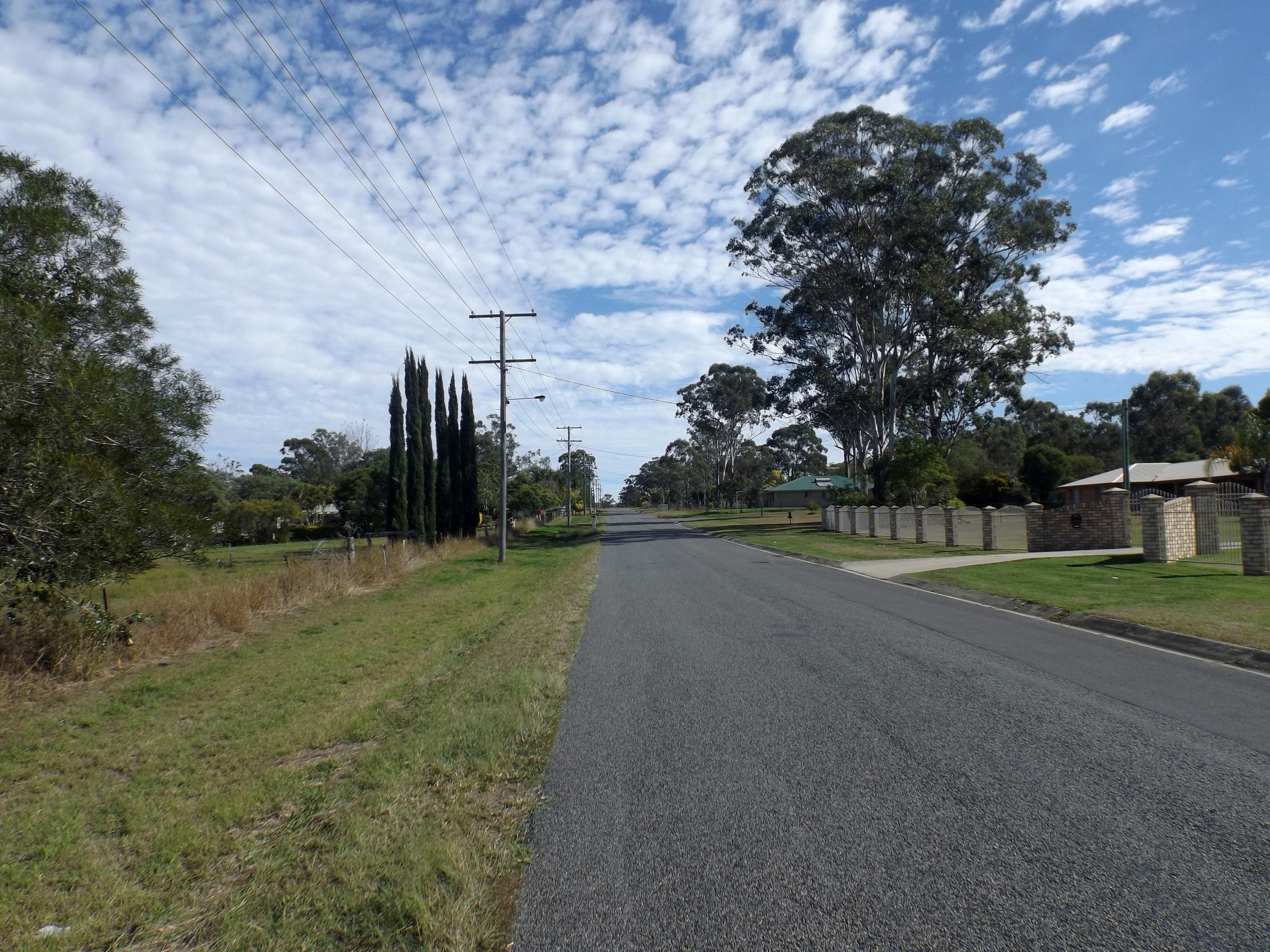
- Elm Street, Walloon, 2015

- Interactive map of Walloon
- Coordinates: 27.6055°S 152.6647°E
- Country: Australia
- State: Queensland
- LGA: City of Ipswich
- Location: 9.1 km (5.7 mi) NE of Rosewood; 11.1 km (6.9 mi) W of Brassall; 12.8 km (8.0 mi) W of Ipswich; 52.7 km (32.7 mi) WSW of Brisbane CBD

Government
  - State electorate: Ipswich West
  - Federal division: Blair

Area
  - Total: 18.4 km^{2} (7.1 sq mi)

Population
  - Total: 2,305 (2021 census)
  - Density: 125.3/km^{2} (324.5/sq mi)
- Time zone: UTC+10:00 (AEST)
- Postcode: 4306
Localities around Walloon
Haigslea	Ironbark	Pine Mountain
Haigslea	Walloon	Karrabin
Thagoona	Thagoona	Amberley

Walloon is a town and rural residential locality in the City of Ipswich, Queensland, Australia. In the 2021 census, the locality of Walloon had a population of 2,305 people.

== Geography ==
The locality is bounded to the north by the Warrego Highway and to the south by the Bremer River. The town is roughly in the centre of the locality. The Rosewood railway line enters the locality from the east (Karrabin), passes through the town which is served by the Walloon railway station (27.6074°S 152.6678°E), and then exits to the south-west (Thagoona).

Haigslea–Amberley Road runs through from north to southeast.

The centre and eastern parts of the locality are rural residential while the land use in the western part of the locality is predominantly grazing on native vegetation.

== History ==
The origin of the suburb name is thought to refer to the French-speaking area of southern Belgium known as Wallonia.

Guilfoyles Creek Non Vested School was opened in 1865 by the Catholic Church. It may have closed and reopened but is believed to have closed permanently when Walloon State School opened in 1877.

A German Lutheran Church opened in Walloon near the railway station on Wednesday 9 July 1873.

In July 1873, the Queensland Government reserved 10 acres (4.0 ha) at Walloon for a "national school" (the former name for "state school"). In October 1876 the government called for tenders to construct a primary school at Walloon. The foundations for the school building were in place by February 1877. Walloon State School opened on 9 July 1877.

On 21 April 1891, sisters Bridget Kate and Mary Jane Broderick (aged 9 and 6 respectively) were drowned in a waterhole near their home in Walloon. Poet Henry Lawson wrote a poem called The Babies of Walloon based on their deaths. In 2006, a sculpture depicting the Broderick sisters playing was unveiled in the Henry Lawson Bicentennial Park in Walloon. In 2015, a new headstone was erected of the children's grave in Ipswich General Cemetery.

== Demographics ==
In the 2011 census, the locality of Walloon had a population of 1,548 people.

In the 2016 census, the locality of Walloon had a population of 1,588 people.

In the 2021 census, the locality of Walloon had a population of 2,305 people.

== Transport ==
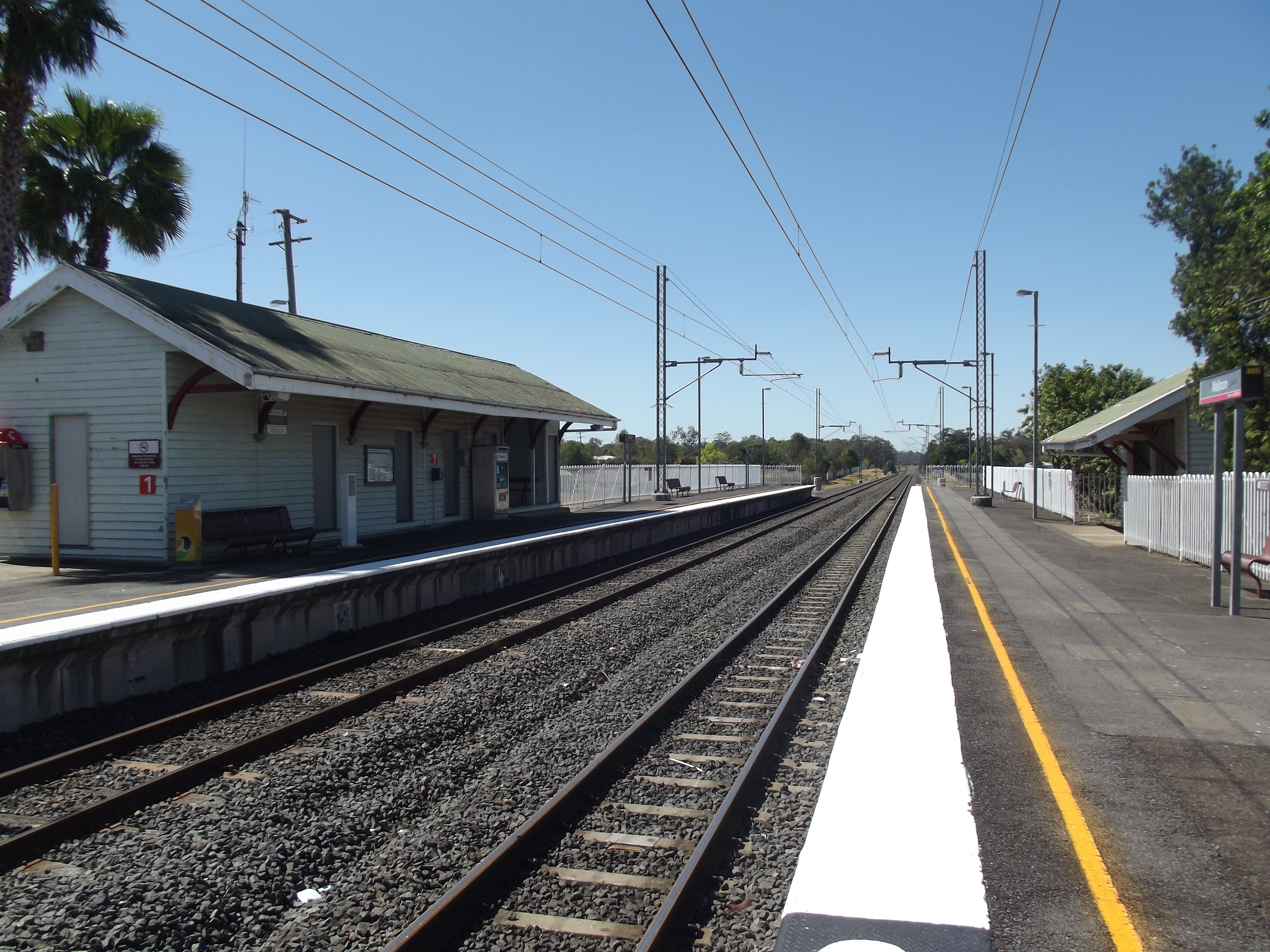
Walloon railway station, 2012

Walloon railway station provides Queensland Rail City network services to Rosewood, Ipswich and Brisbane via Ipswich.

== Education ==
Walloon State School is a government primary (Prep–6) school for boys and girls at 528 Karrabin Rosewood Road (27.6056°S 152.6631°E). In 2018, the school had an enrolment of 234 students with 19 teachers (16 full-time equivalent) and 17 non-teaching staff (10 full-time equivalent). It includes a special education program.

There is no secondary school in the Walloon. The nearest government secondary schools are Ipswich State High School in Brassall, Ipswich, to the east and Rosewood State High School in Rosewood to the south-west.

== Amenities ==
The Ipswich City Council operates a fortnightly mobile library service which visits Queen Street.

The Walloon branch of the Queensland Country Women's Association meets at 534 Karrabin-Rosewood Road.

There are a number of parks in Walloon, including:

- Five Mile Creek Park (27.6265°S 152.6682°E)
- Henry Lawson Bicentennial Park (27.6048°S 152.6612°E)
- Poplar Street Reserve (27.6034°S 152.6722°E)
- Suncrest Park (27.6012°S 152.6641°E)
- Tallwood Park (27.5944°S 152.6751°E)

== Local shops ==
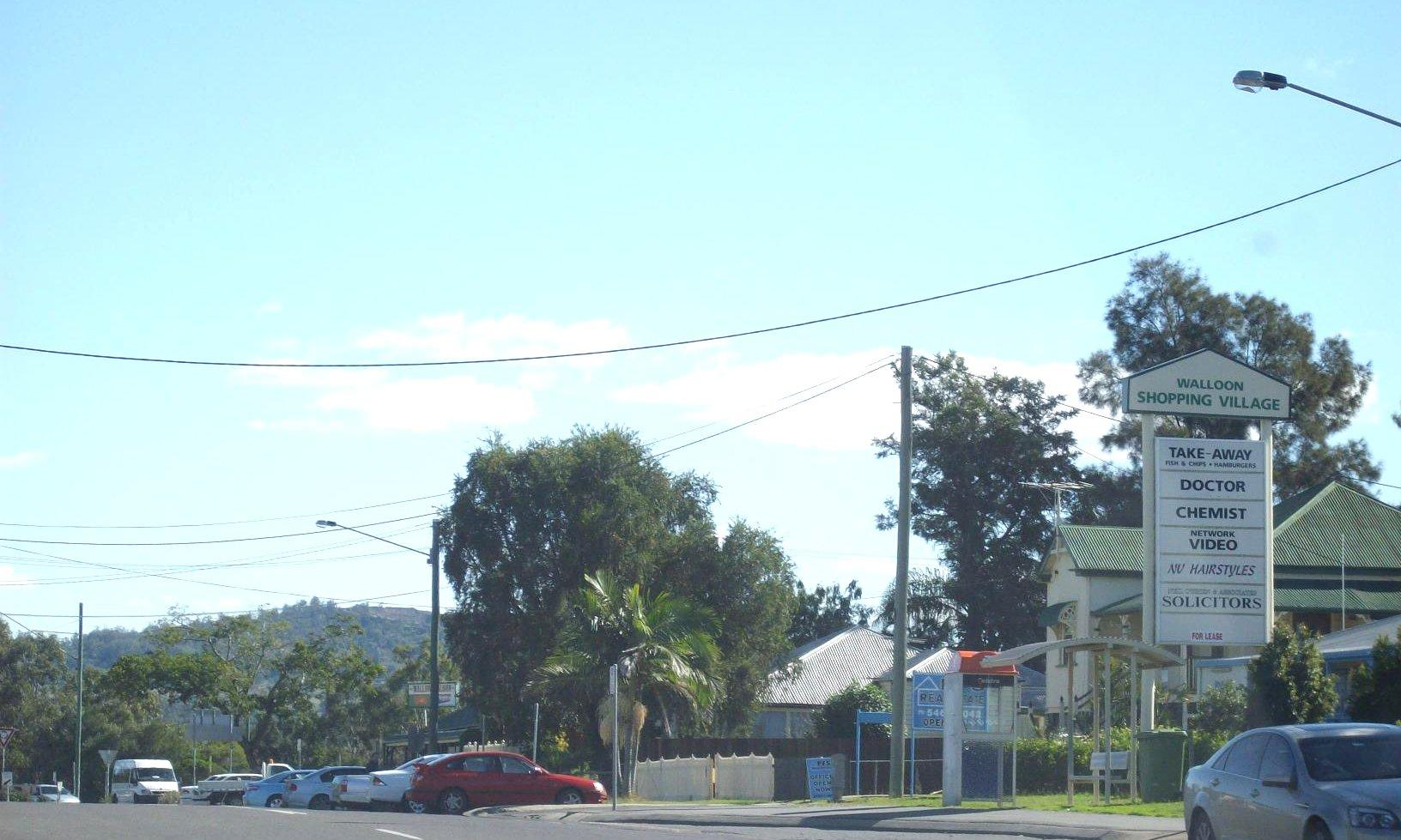
Walloon Shopping Village, 2008

Walloon has an array of small businesses. The businesses available include:

- Take-away food
- Hairdresser
- Real Estate Agent
- Medical Centre
- Chemist
- The historical Walloon Saloon
- Walloon IGA
- Walloon Bakery
- Dentist
- Service Station
