= Rosewood, Queensland =

Rosewood
- Town
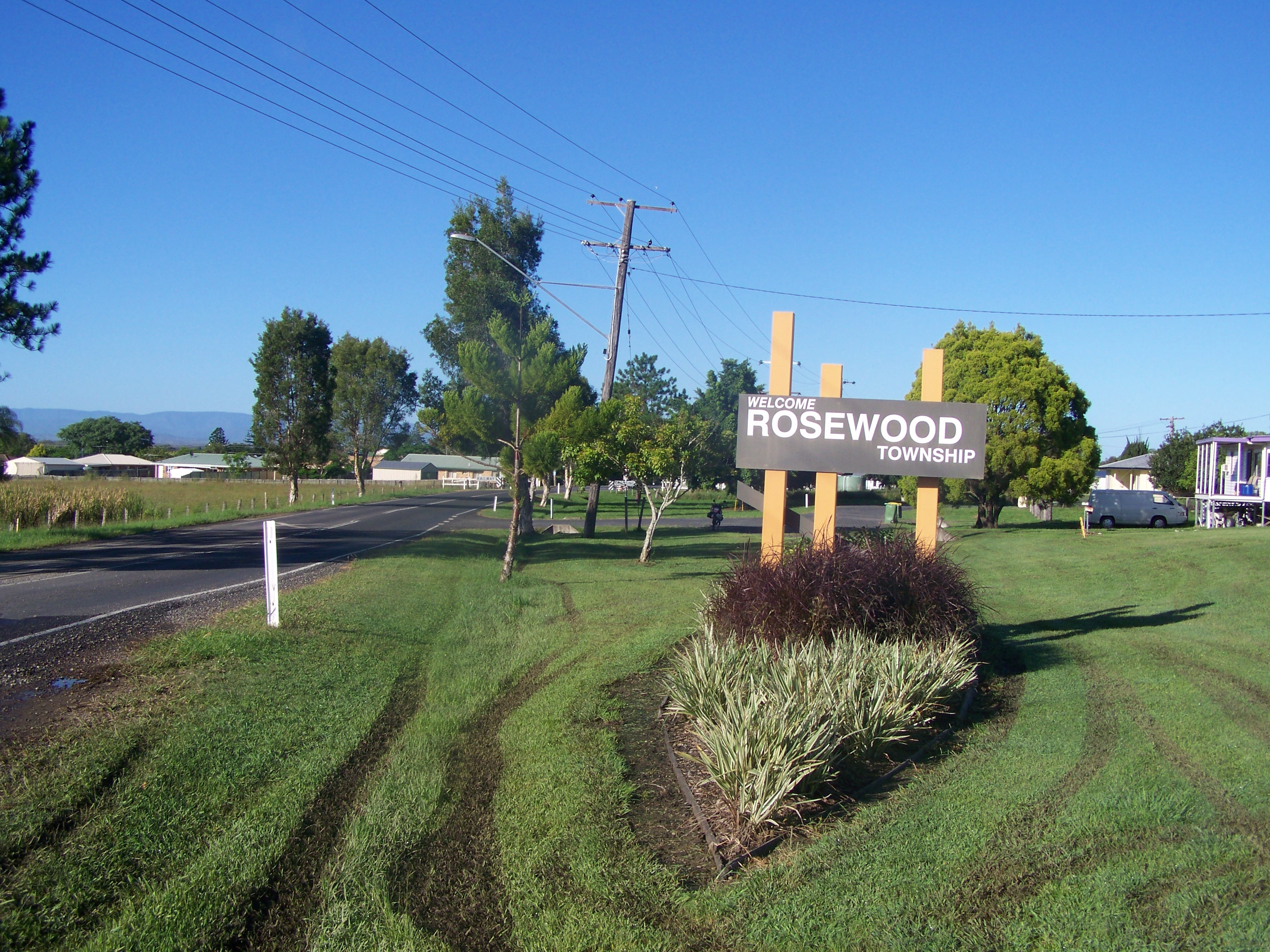

- Interactive map of Rosewood
- Coordinates: 27.6380°S 152.5927°E
- Country: Australia
- State: Queensland
- City: Ipswich
- LGA: City of Ipswich
- Location: 20.5 km (12.7 mi) W of Ipswich CBD; 61.2 km (38.0 mi) SW of Brisbane CBD

Government
  - State electorates: Ipswich West; Scenic Rim
  - Federal division: Blair

Area
  - Total: 31.4 km^{2} (12.1 sq mi)

Population
  - Total: 3,263 (2021 census)
  - Density: 103.92/km^{2} (269.1/sq mi)
- Time zone: UTC+10:00 (AEST)
- Postcode: 4340
Localities around Rosewood
Ashwell	Tallegalla	Mount Marrow
Lanefield	Rosewood	Thagoona
Lower Mount Walker	Ebenezer	Jeebropilly

Rosewood is a rural town and locality in the City of Ipswich, Queensland, Australia. In the 2021 census, the locality of Rosewood had a population of 3,263 people.

== Geography ==
Rosewood is in the Bremer Valley, 60 kilometres (37 mi) south-west of the Brisbane CBD, and 19 kilometres (12 mi) from Ipswich. Part of the town's border is marked by the Bremer River to the south, and the decommissioned Marburg branch railway line on the Little Liverpool Range to the north.

Perrys Knob is a hill (27.6094°S 152.5961°E), rising 292 metres (958 ft) above sea level. It takes its name from the Perry family who owned land containing the knob and its western slopes.

The Main Line railway enters the locality from the east (Thagoona) and exits to the west (Lanefield). The locality had a number of railway stations (from west to east):

- Rosewood railway station, serving the town (27.6431°S 152.5926°E)
- Yarrowlea railway station, now abandoned (27.6328°S 152.6175°E)

There were two railway stations on the now-closed Marburg branch railway line (from north to south):

- Perrys Knob railway station, now disamantled (27.6163°S 152.5838°E)
- North Rosewood railway station, now abandoned (27.6289°S 152.5848°E)

Rosewood–Marburg Road exits to the north.

== History ==
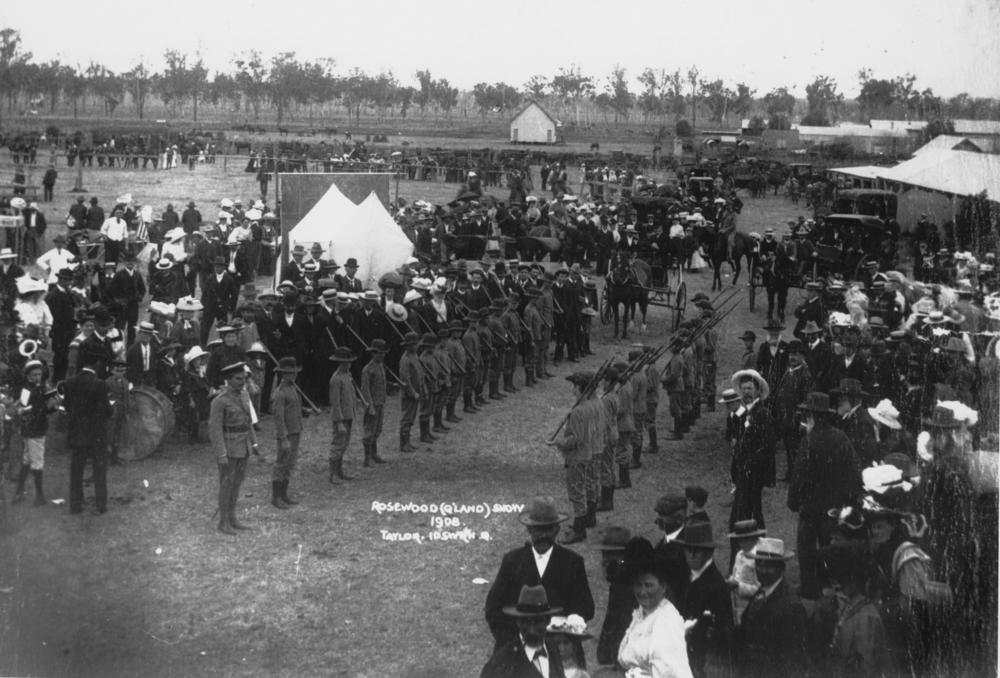
Rosewood Show, 1908

The origin of the suburb name is believed to be derived from the Rosewood (Acacia fasciculifera) or the Dysoxylum (a Mahogany species, referred to locally as a rosewood despite bearing little relation) tree or shrub, both commonly found in the south-east Queensland region at the time of Rosewood's settlement.

The site of the town was first owned by two men, William Mathews and Foote Moore.

The railway passed through Rosewood in 1865.

Rosewood Provisional School opened on 17 October 1870. In 1875, it became Rosewood State School. In 1962, a secondary department was added to the school, until a separate state high school was established in 1980.

Rosewood was proclaimed a shire in 1905.

The first coal mine in the Lanefield district, west of Rosewood, commenced production in 1918. As part of these workings, two railway branches from the Brisbane to Toowoomba main line were constructed to the mines at Lanefield Colliery (1934 to 1965) and Westvale Colliery (1929 to 1960).

St. Brigid’s Church was opened on 13 February 1910 by Bishop Duhig, replacing an earlier timber building. St Brigid's Catholic Primary School was established on 30 January 1922 by the Sisters of Mercy under the leadership of Sister Mary Stephen. It had an enrolment of 125 students in its first year of opening. The Sisters of Mercy left the school in 2011, but the school continues to operate according to the values of the Sisters of Mercy.

On Saturday 27 January 1923, a new Church of Christ chapel was officially opened at 34 Albert Street (27.6396°S 152.5906°E), with the former building being relocated to use as a dwelling. Since at least 2002, the building has been in private ownership.

In the late 1930s, a motor racing circuit was built in Rosewood which became the first purpose-built road racing circuit in Queensland and possibly in Australia. Due to World War II, the circuit was not open for long. The circuit was primarily used for motorcycle racing, the last of which was held in 1949. The track was dirt-surface and no trace remains. Car racing was also held briefly but did not return after the war.

Rosewood State High School opened on 29 January 1980. Secondary school had been available through Rosewood State School from 1962, an arrangement which ceased with the opening of the state high school.

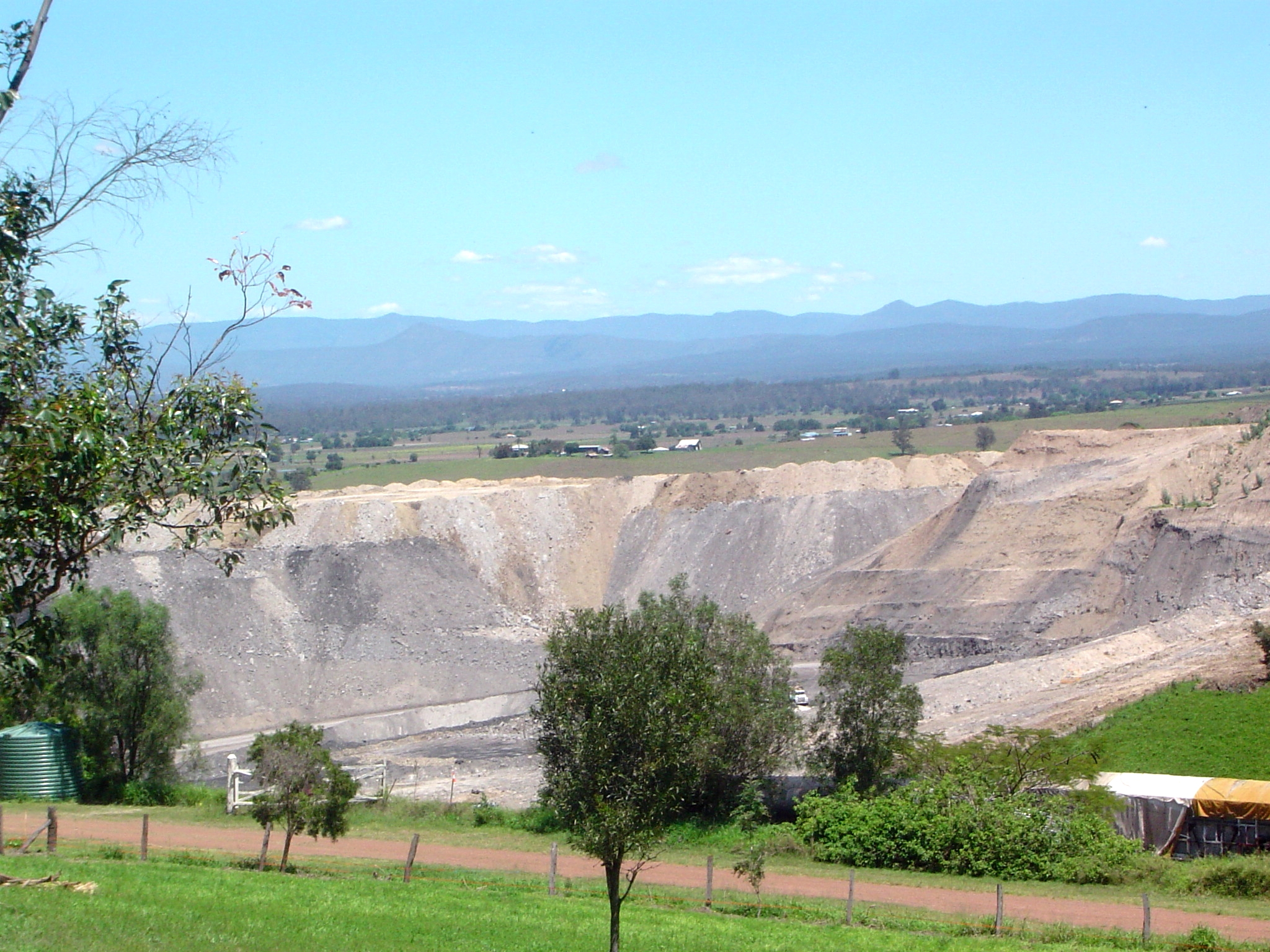
New Oakleigh Mine closed in 2013

The New Oakleigh Mine is located to the town's north and was one of the last remaining coal mines in the area at the time of its closure in 2013.

Although St Brigid's Catholic Church had been slowly leaning for many years, by 2020 it was deemed unsafe and the church was forced to close. Repairs costing $3 million were needed to make it level again. As at February 2022, the repair work had not commenced.

== Demographics ==
In the 1986 census, Rosewood recorded a population of 1,698 people.

In the 2016 census, the locality Rosewood recorded a population of 2,834 people, 53.3% female and 46.7% male. The median age of the Rosewood population was 39 years, 1 year above the national median of 38. 83.6% of people living in Rosewood were born in Australia. The other top responses for country of birth were England 3.1%, New Zealand 2.2%, South Africa 0.5%, Scotland 0.5% and Germany 0.4%. 91.4% of people spoke only English at home; the next most common languages were 0.3% Dinka, 0.1% Dutch, 0.1% Italian, 0.1% Auslan and 0.1% German.

In the 2021 census, the locality of Rosewood had a population of 3,263 people, 53.4% female and 46.6% male. The median age of the Rosewood population was 39 years, 1 year above the national median of 38. 83.5% of people living in Rosewood were born in Australia. The other top responses for country of birth were England 2.8%, New Zealand 2.1%, Scotland 0.6%, South Africa 0.4%, and Germany 0.3%. 87.8% of people spoke only English at home; the next most common languages were 0.5% Dinka, 0.2% Afrikaans, 0.2% Greek, 0.2% Tongan, and 0.2% Bengali.

== Heritage listings ==
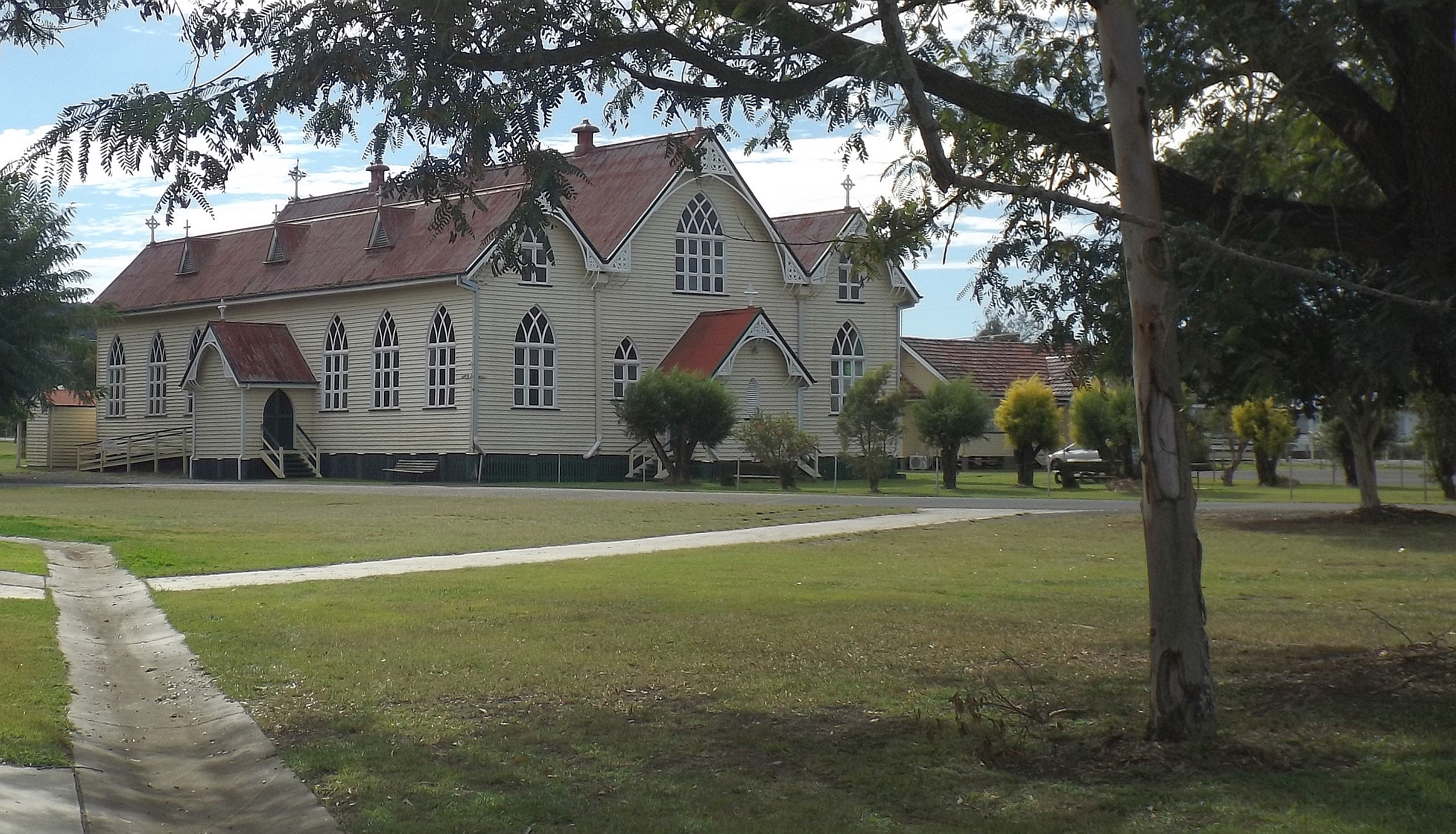
St Brigids Catholic Church

Rosewood has a number of heritage-listed sites, including:

- 1 John Street (27.642°S 152.5938°E): Rosewood Courthouse
- 96 John Street (27.634°S 152.5892°E): Glendalough
- 11 Railway Street (27.6408°S 152.5944°E): St Brigids Catholic Church

== Education ==
Rosewood State School is a government primary (Prep–6) school for boys and girls at 20 School Street (27.6435°S 152.5926°E). In 2018, the school had an enrolment of 284 students with 20 teachers (19 full-time equivalent) and 23 non-teaching staff (13 full-time equivalent).

St Brigid's Primary School is a Catholic primary (Prep–6) school for boys and girls at 11 Railway Street (27.6419°S 152.5949°E). In 2018, the school had an enrolment of 161 students with 14 teachers (11 full-time equivalent) and 13 non-teaching staff (6 full-time equivalent).

Rosewood State High School is a government secondary (7–12) school for boys and girls at 46 Lanefield Road (27.6358°S 152.5856°E). In 2018, the school had an enrolment of 455 students with 46 teachers and 35 non-teaching staff (23 full-time equivalent). It includes a special education program for both primary and secondary students.

== Amenities ==
Ipswich City Council operates its Rosewood public library at 15 Railway Street (corner of John Street, 27.6424°S 152.5933°E).

The Rosewood branch of the Queensland Country Women's Association meets at 4 John Street (27.6422°S 152.5934°E).

There are a number of churches in Rosewood, including:

- St Luke's Anglican Church, 72–74 John Street (27.6372°S 152.5912°E)
- St Brigid's Catholic Church, 11 Railway Street
- Rosewood Uniting Church, 21 John Street (27.6401°S 152.5930°E)
- Rosewood Baptist Church, 84 John Street (27.6359°S 152.5904°E)
- St Matthew's Lutheran Church, 63 Matthew Street (27.6367°S 152.5941°E)

Despite the name, Rosewood Seventh-Day Adventist Church is located in neighbouring Thagoona.

== Transport ==
Rosewood is the terminus of Queensland Rail City network's Ipswich and Rosewood railway line. Rosewood railway station provides commuter rail services to Ipswich and Brisbane via Ipswich.

Translink also provides bus route 539, which terminates in Rosewood. The route services key Lockyer Valley centres, such as Laidley, Gatton, Grantham and Helidon, to the west of Rosewood.
