= Rosewood railway station =

Railway station in Queensland, Australia

Rosewood
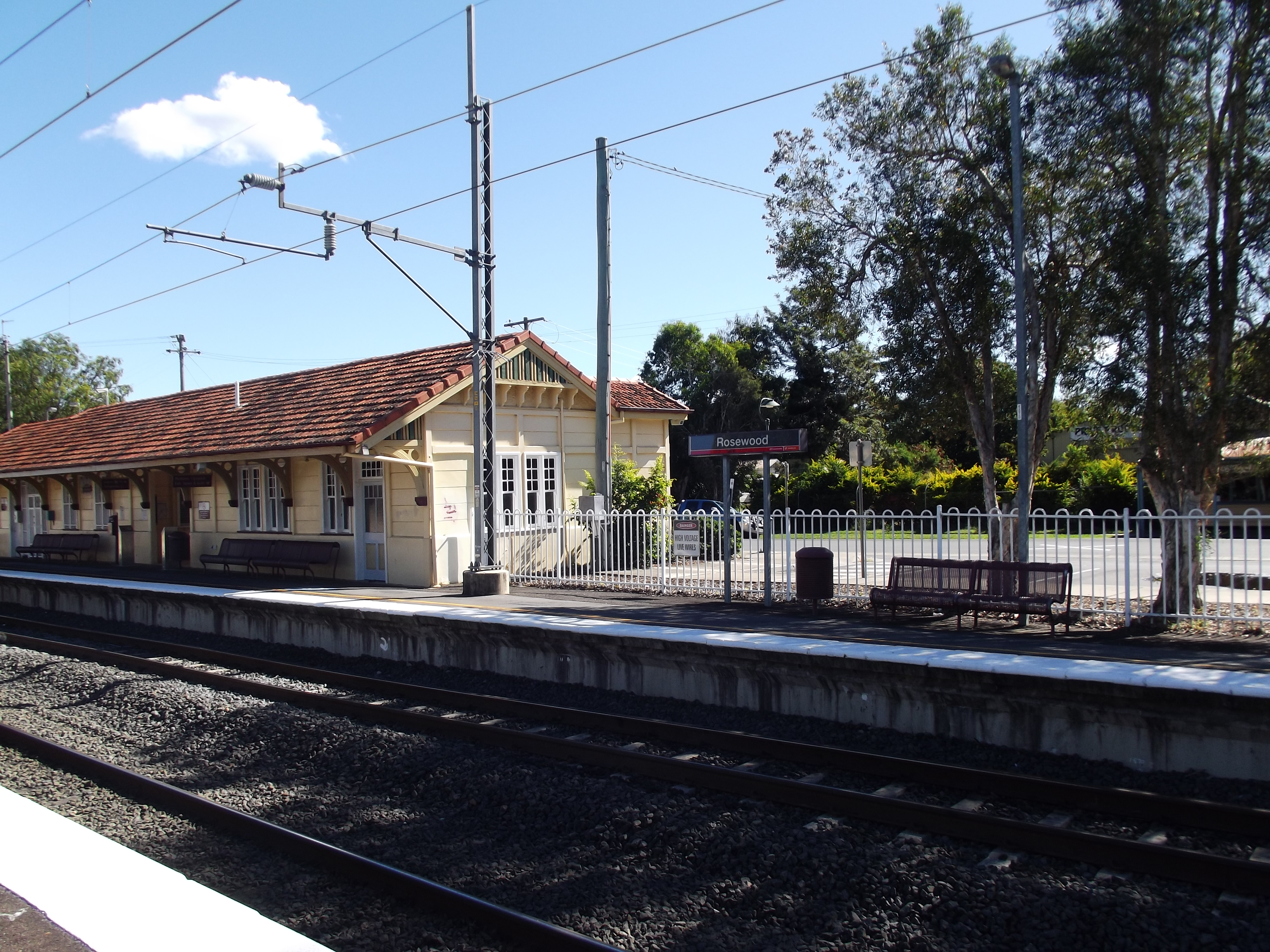
- Rosewood station in May 2012

General information
- Location: Railway Street, Rosewood
- Coordinates: 27°38′35″S 152°35′33″E
- Owner: Queensland Rail
- Operator: Queensland Rail
- Line: T1 Ipswich/Rosewood
- Distance: 56.97 kilometres from Central
- Platforms: 2 side
- Tracks: 2

Construction
- Structure type: Ground
- Parking: 33 bays
- Cycle facilities: Yes
- Accessible: Yes

Other information
- Status: Staffed
- Station code: 600362 (platform 1); 600363 (platform 2)
- Website: Queensland Rail

History
- Opened: 31 July 1865; 161 years ago

Services
Preceding station	Queensland Rail	Following station
Thagoona towards Caboolture, Nambour or Gympie North	Ipswich/Rosewood line	Terminus
Thagoona towards Ipswich	Rosewood shuttle	Terminus
Ipswich towards Brisbane	The Westlander	Laidley towards Charleville
Location

Rosewood is a railway station operated by Queensland Rail, which serves as the terminus of the Ipswich/Rosewood line. It opened in 1865 and serves the Ipswich suburb of Rosewood. It is a ground level station, featuring two side platforms.

== History ==
The station was opened on 31 July 1865 as Rosewood Gate, serving as a conditional stop for passenger trains travelling to Grandchester (Bigge's Camp). It was formalised as a station in late 1866.

The now-closed Marburg railway line split from the Main railway line at Rosewood.

== Services ==
Rosewood is the western terminus of the electrified Queensland Rail network. It is the terminus for all services to/from Ipswich, with some peak-hour services continuing to Bowen Hills and Caboolture.

Rosewood is served by Queensland Rail Travel's twice weekly Westlander travelling between Brisbane and Charleville.

== Platforms and services ==
Rosewood platform arrangement
Platform	Line	Destination	Notes
1	T1 Ipswich/Rosewood	Roma Street (to Caboolture and Nambour/Gympie North lines)	
2			

== Transport Links ==
Bus Queensland Lockyer Valley operate one bus route to and from Rosewood station:

- 539: to Helidon

This route was once serviced by McCafferty's which continued onto Toowoomba where it connected with a rail motor service from Toowoomba to Roma which operated until 1993.
