= Ices =

Ices may refer to:

- Frozen volatiles, in the context of astronomy and planetary science
- Phases of ice
- Frozen desserts
- Ices (album), by Lia Ices, 2014
  - Lia Ices, American singer-songwriter

== See also ==
- ICES (disambiguation)
- Ice (disambiguation)
- IceS, a technical component of Icecast software
- Isis (disambiguation)
