= Thousand Eyes (disambiguation) =

Thousand Eyes may refer to:

- ThousandEyes, an American network intelligence company
- "Thousand Eyes", a song by FKA Twigs from Magdalene
- "Thousand Eyes", a song by Lia Ices from Ices
- "Thousand Eyes", a song by Of Monsters and Men from Beneath the Skin
- Thousand Eyes, a Japanese melodic death metal band
