= Ice (disambiguation) =

Ice is the solid state of water.

Ice, ice, or ICE may also refer to:

- United States Immigration and Customs Enforcement, known by its acronym, ICE
- Immigration Compliance and Enforcement, a department of UK Immigration Enforcement
- Intercity Express, a German high-speed train
- Internal combustion engine, a fuel engine
- Methamphetamine, primarily used as a recreational drug

== Computing ==
=== Multimedia ===
- In-car entertainment, hardware or software that provides entertainment in cars
- ICE (scanning) (Image Correction and Enhancement) for removing surface defects from a scanned photo/image
- Immersive Cinema Experience, a film format
- ICE (Information, Communication, and Entertainment), an in-flight entertainment system operated by Emirates

=== Telephony/Radio ===
- In Case of Emergency, emergency numbers stored on a mobile or cellular phone
- Interference cancellation equipment, in radio equipment such as cellular repeaters

=== Hardware ===
- iCE (FPGA), a programmable logic device family by Lattice Semiconductor
- In-circuit emulation, a computer debugging hardware device

=== Software ===
- ICE validation, internal consistency evaluators, a set of tools for validating Windows Installer packages
- IceWM (Ice Window Manager)
- Interactive Creative Environment, a visual programming platform for Autodesk Softimage
- Internal compiler error, a type of compilation error
- Internet Communications Engine, a computer software middleware platform developed by ZeroC
- Microsoft Research Image Composite Editor, a panorama stitching program

=== Technical standard/platform ===
- Information and Content Exchange, an XML protocol for content syndication
- Integrated collaboration environment, a platform for virtual teams
- Inter-Client Exchange, an X Window System protocol framework
- Interactive Connectivity Establishment, a mechanism for NAT traversal

== Science and technology ==
=== Medical and biological ===
- ICE (chemotherapy), a cancer treatment
- Caspase 1, or Interleukin-1 beta Converting Enzyme
- Ice-ice, a disease condition of seaweed
- Integrative and conjugative element, a mobile genetic element

=== Chemical ===
- Ice (drug), a street name for the stimulant 4-Methylaminorex
- ICE table (initial, change, equilibrium), a table for tracking chemical reactions

=== Transportation ===
- Intercity Express, a German high-speed train
- InterCity Express (Queensland Rail), a train in Brisbane, Australia
- Iowa, Chicago and Eastern Railroad, US
- Ice (yacht), built in Germany in 2005

=== Other science and technology ===
- ICE (cipher), a block cipher in cryptography
- International Cometary Explorer, a spacecraft for studying the plasma interaction between comets and the solar environment

== Organizations ==
=== United Kingdom ===
- Institution of Civil Engineers
- Institute for Creative Enterprise, an institute at Edge Hill University
- Institute for Creative Enterprises, a part of Coventry School of Art and Design
- The Ice Organisation or MyIce, a sustainable rewards programme

=== United States ===
- Information Council for the Environment
- Institute for Credentialing Excellence
- Institute of Culinary Education, an institute in New York City, New York
- Intercontinental Exchange, an American financial services company which operate financial and commodity exchanges like NYSE and ICE Futures, as well as clearing house
- Iron Crown Enterprises, a tabletop role-playing games company
- Innovative Concepts in Entertainment

=== Elsewhere ===
- iCE Advertisements (Insane Creators Enterprise), a digital art group
- Independent Commission of Experts, the former name of the investigation into assets moved to Switzerland around the Second World War
- Independent Crown entities, a part of New Zealand's Crown entities
- Indonesia Convention Exhibition, a venue in Banten
- The Institute for Cross-cultural Exchange, a Canadian educational charity
- Instituto Costarricense de Electricidad, a Costa Rican Institute of Electricity
- International Currency Exchange, a currency exchange provider
- Italian Trade Agency (Italian: Istituto nazionale per il commercio estero), a government agency focused on fostering international trade of Italian goods and products

== Arts, media, and entertainment ==
=== Films ===
- Ice (1970 film), an American drama by Robert Kramer
- Ice (1998 film), a made-for-TV American disaster film by Jean de Segonzac
- Ice (2003 film), an Indian Tamil-language film by Raghuraj
- Ice (2018 film), a Russian film

=== Literature ===
- Ice (Dukaj novel) (2007), by Jacek Dukaj
- Ice (Durst novel) (2009), by Sarah Beth Durst, a modernization of the fairy tale "East of the Sun and West of the Moon"
- Ice (Johnson novel) (2002), by Shane Johnson
- Ice (Kavan novel) (1967), by Anna Kavan
- Ice (Nowra novel) (2008), by Louis Nowra
- Ice (Sorokin novel) (2002), by Vladimir Sorokin
- Ice, a 1978 novel by James Follett
- Ice, a 1983 novel by Ed McBain in the 87th Precinct series
- Ice, a 2011 novel by Sonallah Ibrahim
- International Corpus of English, a set of text corpora representing varieties of English around the world

=== Music ===
==== Groups and labels ====
- Ice (band), a British band who recorded in the 1990s
- Ice Records, a record label
- International Contemporary Ensemble, an American classical music group
- Lafayette Afro Rock Band or Ice, a France-based American funk band

==== Songs ====
- "Ice" (Kelly Rowland song)
- "Ice" (Lights song)
- "Ice" (The Rasmus song)
- "Ice" (The Ritchie Family Song)
- "Ice" (Morgenshtern song)
- "Ice", by Camel from I Can See Your House from Here
- "Ice", by Peso Pluma from Éxodo
- "Ice", by Sarah McLachlan from Fumbling Towards Ecstasy
- "Ice", by Spirit from Clear
- "Ice", by Magic Dirt from Life Was Better

=== Television ===
- Ice (American TV series), a 2016–2018 American series for Audience Network
- "Ice" (The X-Files), an episode of The X-Files
- "I.C.E", an episode of Sirens
- "Ice", an episode of Alias

=== Other uses in arts, media, and entertainment ===
- ICE (anime), a 2007 original video animation
- Ice (character), a DC comic book superheroine
- Ice (webcomic), a Canadian graphic novel series
- Intrusion Countermeasures Electronics, a phrase used in cyberpunk literature

== People with name ==
- Ice Seguerra (born 1983), a Filipino actor and singer
- Logan Ice (born 1995), an American baseball player
- Thomas Ice, the executive director of the Pre-Trib Research Center, a Christian thinktank

== Other uses ==
- Ice, slang for diamonds
- Ice, Kentucky, an unincorporated community
- Inventory of Conflict and Environment, a research project at American University's School of International Service
- Icelandic language (ISO 639-3 code: ice)
- Iceland (UNDP code: ICE)
- Icelandair (ICAO airline designator: ICE)

== See also ==
- Ice-T (born 1958), an American rapper and actor
- Ice Cube (born 1969), an American rapper and actor
- Ice Spice (born 2000), an American rapper
- Vanilla Ice (born 1967), an American rapper
- ISIS, the Islamic State of Iraq and Syria
- Ices (disambiguation)
- Iceman (disambiguation)
- Iceberg (disambiguation)
