= ICES (disambiguation) =

ICES may refer to:

- Institute for Clinical Evaluative Sciences
- International Council for the Exploration of the Sea
- Integrated Civil Engineering System
- Inflight Crew Escape System, in the Space Shuttle
- Institute for Computational Engineering and Sciences, the University of Texas at Austin
- International Conference on Environmental Systems, an annual technical conference for human spaceflight technology
- The International Consumer Electronics Show
- Le Institut catholique d'études supérieures, in Vendée, France
- Intercity Express (ICE), a high-speed rail system in Germany
  - ICE S, a German high-speed train

== See also ==
- ICE (disambiguation)
- Ices (disambiguation)
