= Global Cool =

UK Climate Change public body

Global Cool Foundation
- Global Cool logo
- Formation: 2007
- Founder: Tessa Tennant
- Type: Climate change charity
- Headquarters: United Kingdom
- Remarks: Ceased operations in June 2018; supported by celebrities including Leonardo DiCaprio and Orlando Bloom

Global Cool was a green living campaign run by the Global Cool Foundation, a registered climate change charity in the United Kingdom. As well as running the Global Cool lifestyle magazine website, Global Cool Foundation also worked with corporate partners and the UK Government to promote sustainability to a mainstream audience. As of June 2018 the charity ceased to exist.

== History ==
Global Cool was founded in 2007 with a mission to raise awareness of climate change. Tony Blair endorsed the campaign at its launch party in 10 Downing Street. Global Cool worked with celebrities and the media and entertainment industries to promote green behaviours such as using public transport and taking flight-free holidays.

== People ==
The board of non-executive trustees was chaired by Tessa Tennant, who also founded The Ice Organisation.

== Celebrity supporters ==
Global Cool attracted the support of several famous names, including Leonardo DiCaprio, Orlando Bloom, Sienna Miller, Scissor Sisters, Kasabian, Heather Graham, Josh Hartnett, Brandon Flowers, Johnny Borrell, Dave Grohl, Amitabh Bachchan, Rosario Dawson, Tony Blair, Shekhar Kapur, KT Tunstall, Perry Farrell, Maroon 5, Scott Henshall, Adam Croasdell, Jo Wood, Leah Wood, Stella Tennant, VV Brown, Rick Edwards, Scott Mills, George Lamb, Mr Hudson, Gemma Cairney and Grace Woodward.

== Funding ==
In 2007 Global Cool launched a mobile phone recycling scheme in partnership with Vodafone to help fund its work. Other corporate partners included Logica and The Body Shop. Global Cool also received funding from Department for Environment, Food and Rural Affairs.
