= Electric multiple unit (Queensland Rail) =

Australian train class

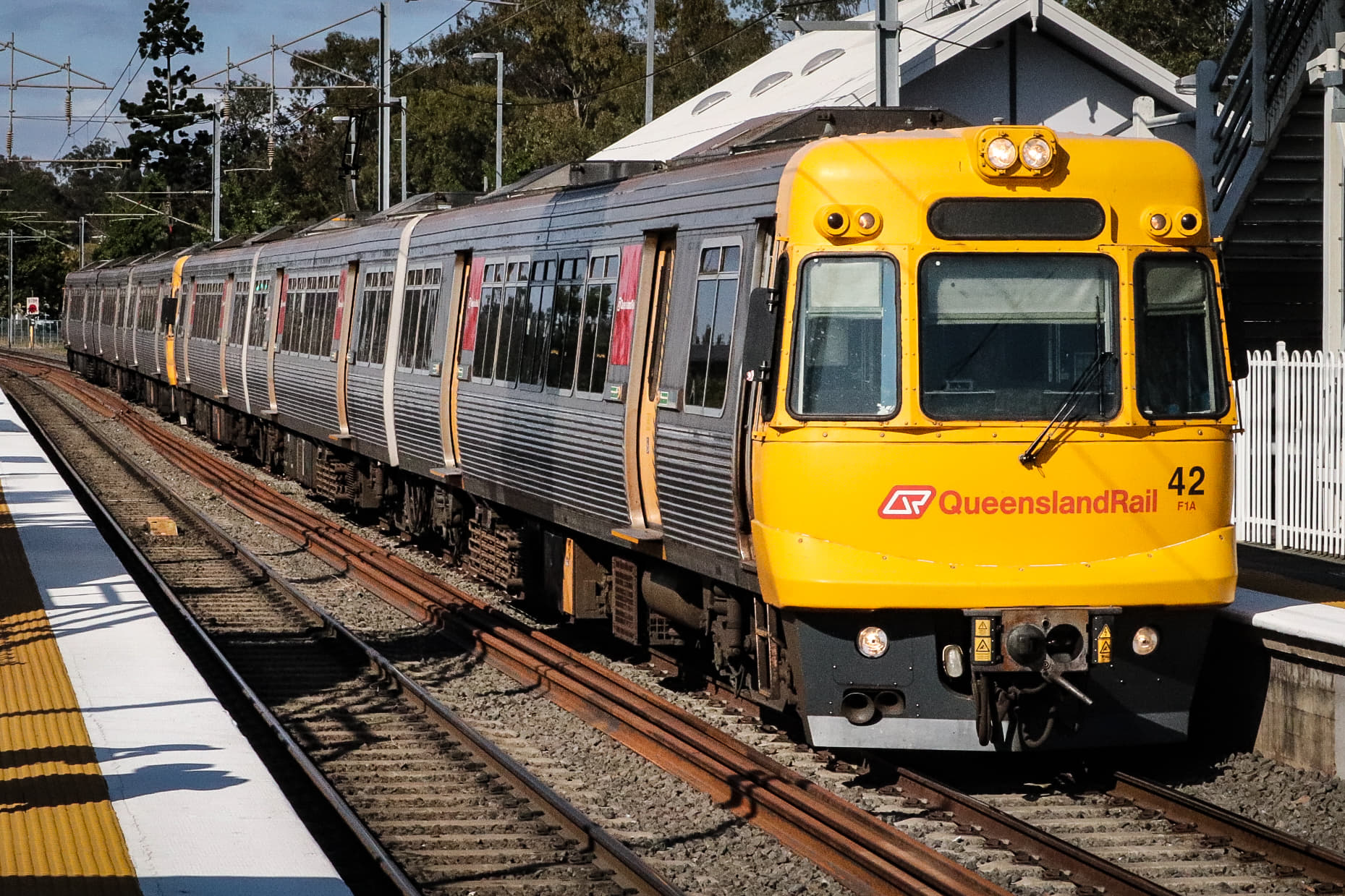
- EMU 42 at Wacol station in September 2018

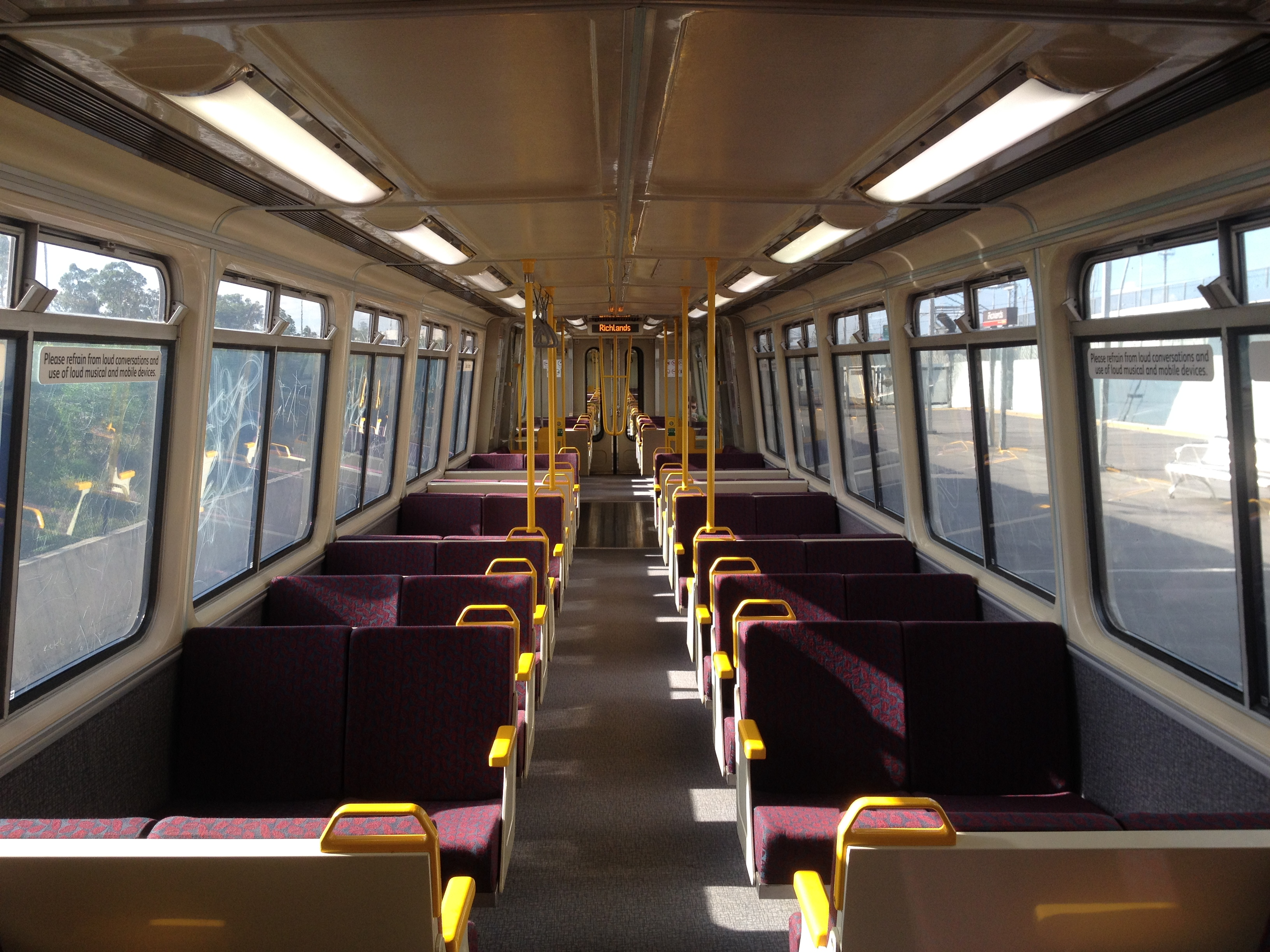
- Interior of an EMU
- Stock type: Electric multiple unit
- In service: 17 November 1979 – 5 July 2025 (45 years, 230 days)
- Manufacturer: Walkers
- Built at: Maryborough
- Replaced: SX carriages 2000 Class Railmotors
- Constructed: 1979–1986
- Entered service: 17 November 1979; 46 years ago
- Refurbished: 1998–2012
- Retired: 5 July 2025; 16 months ago
- Scrapped: 2018–present
- Number built: 264 carriages
- Successor: New Generation Rollingstock; QTMP Rollingstock (Future)
- Formation: 3 carriage sets
- Fleet numbers: 01–88
- Capacity: 3 carriage set: Seating: 248; Standing: 252 Total (Crush): 500
- Operator: Queensland Rail
- Lines served: All City network lines except Airport, Gold Coast & Sunshine Coast

Specifications
- Train length: 72.64 m (238 ft 4 in)
- Width: 2.72 m (8 ft 11 in)
- Height: 3.9 m (12 ft 10 in)
- Floor height: 1.1 m (3 ft 7 in)
- Doors: Air operated. Originally fitted with handles to activate. Later retrofitted with push buttons either side of the doors.
- Wheel diameter: 840 mm (33 in) (new)
- Wheelbase: 2,500 mm (8 ft 2 in)
- Maximum speed: 100 km/h (62 mph)
- Weight: 117.8 t (115.9 long tons; 129.9 short tons)
- Traction system: ASEA thyristor–phase-fired controller
- Traction motors: 8 × 135 kW (181 hp) separately excited DC motor (6 on sets 60–79)
- Power output: 1.08 MW (1,450 hp)
- Transmission: Axle hung; 97 : 17 gear ratio
- Acceleration: 0.775 m/s^{2} (2.54 ft/s^{2})
- Deceleration: 1.17 m/s^{2} (3.8 ft/s^{2})
- HVAC: Sigma Air Conditioning
- Electric system: 25 kV 50 Hz AC (nominal) from overhead catenary
- Current collection: Pantograph
- UIC classification: Bo′Bo′+Bo′Bo′+2′2′ or Bo'Bo'+Bo'2'+2'2' (Sets 60 - 79)
- Braking systems: Blended regenerative electric and electro-pneumatic
- Coupling system: Scharfenberg at each end of 3 car set
- Multiple working: Within type; With ICE
- Track gauge: 1,067 mm (3 ft 6 in)

The Electric Multiple Unit (EMU) is a retired class of electric multiple unit manufactured by Walkers in Maryborough for Queensland Rail between 1979 and 1986. They were the first fleet of electric multiple units to be used in Queensland. They were retired from the Queensland Rail network in 2025.

== History ==
=== Introduction ===
To provide rolling stock for the electrification of the Ferny Grove and Darra section of the Brisbane rail network, in 1976 Queensland Rail issued a tender for 13 three-carriage electric multiple units. Bids were received from Clyde Engineering, Comeng, General Electric, Goninans and Walkers, with the latter awarded the contract with electrical equipment to be supplied by ASEA. The first was delivered in May 1979, entering service on 17 November 1979 with all in service by October 1980.

Before the first had been delivered, a further 11 units were ordered for the electrification of the Shorncliffe to Kingston section. The first was delivered in November 1980. These differed from the first order by having longitudinal ribs in the panels above the windows.

In February 1981, a further 36 three-carriage units were ordered to provide rolling stock for electrification of services to Petrie and Lota. The last 20 were built with one cab, requiring them to operate as six-carriage units. The fibreglass cab moulds were still fitted at the non-driving end, but not fitted out. These had only six powered axles, versus eight when two of the dual cab units operated in six-car formation.

Further orders for 16, eight and four units were made in 1983, 1984 and 1985, bringing the total ordered to 88 with the last delivered in December 1986.

In September 1986, units 84, 85, 86 and 88 were hauled to Gladstone to operate a VIP train to Rockhampton in connection with the completion of an electrification project, before operating some special services to Bajool and Mount Larcom.

Units 81–88 were fitted with VHF radios to allow them to operate Sunshine Coast line services from Caboolture to Nambour from 29 April 1988, pending the delivery of the InterCity Express fleet. Others appeared on Sunshine Coast services with hand held radios, while 84 and 68 ran through to Gympie North in August 1990. After the InterCity Express units entered service in September 1988, EMUs operated in multiple with them for a period.

In 1996, some appeared on Gold Coast line services, although they were only used sparingly, not being geared to operate at the 140km/h line speed.

Starting from the early 2000s, the class were modified with new pilots reaching down to the rails and including ditch lights, and plastic sloped covers over the anti-climbers to prevent train surfing. The non-driving ends of the 60 series, however, did not receive the new pilots. Units 1 to 19 also had the area around the front windows painted black – these units began to be referred to as "Bandicoots". Around this same time, the original 3 curved windows of the drivers cabs were replaced with 5 flat glass panels. This was not done to the guard only cabs.

In the early 2010s, the units had their doors painted yellow and had the interior fittings changed – the handrails positioned throughout the carriages (originally bare polished steel) were painted yellow, and the handholds on the seats (originally black) were too painted yellow. The handles on the doors were also replaced with a push-button system, and for DDA compliance, selected seats were removed throughout the trains and replaced with designated wheelchair spaces.

=== Retirement ===
The introduction of the New Generation Rollingstock (NGR) fleet in 2017 signalled the imminent retirement of the EMU fleet. Withdrawals began in 2018 with EMU06 being taken to North Ipswich Railway Workshops for stripping. By January 2019, 30 were in store. Originally it was envisaged all would be withdrawn once all of the NGRs had been delivered, but due to issues with the introduction of the new trains as well as an increase in services, some EMUs were retained until 2025.

In August 2019, Queensland Rail operated a farewell tour with units 01 and 04 over two days covering all Brisbane suburban lines including a reenactment of the first electric train service in Brisbane from Ferny Grove to Darra. Both units were removed from service and taken to Ipswich Workshops for static preservation.

In 2021, EMU 21 was given to the Queensland Fire Department and is set to be used for training exercises.

October 2022 saw EMU 42 being partially modified for use in the 2022 Netflix series Boy Swallows Universe. This included removing the plastic cover from the anticlimber, painting one of the sets of passenger ingress/egress doors silvery grey (resembling the original livery), replacing the dark red cushions on some of the seats with blue cushions similar to those the EMUs were originally fitted with and placing a 1980s map of Brisbane's suburban network into the carriage. Further alterations were made through CGI. It and Doomben Station appear in Episode 6 of the series, albeit with the station in the guise of Bowen Hills Station.

The final revenue service to be performed by the Electric multiple unit trains was on 5 July 2025 and travelled on the Caboolture, Ferny Grove, Ipswich and Shorncliffe railway lines, stopping all stations. EMU 59 was the sole train running the tour.

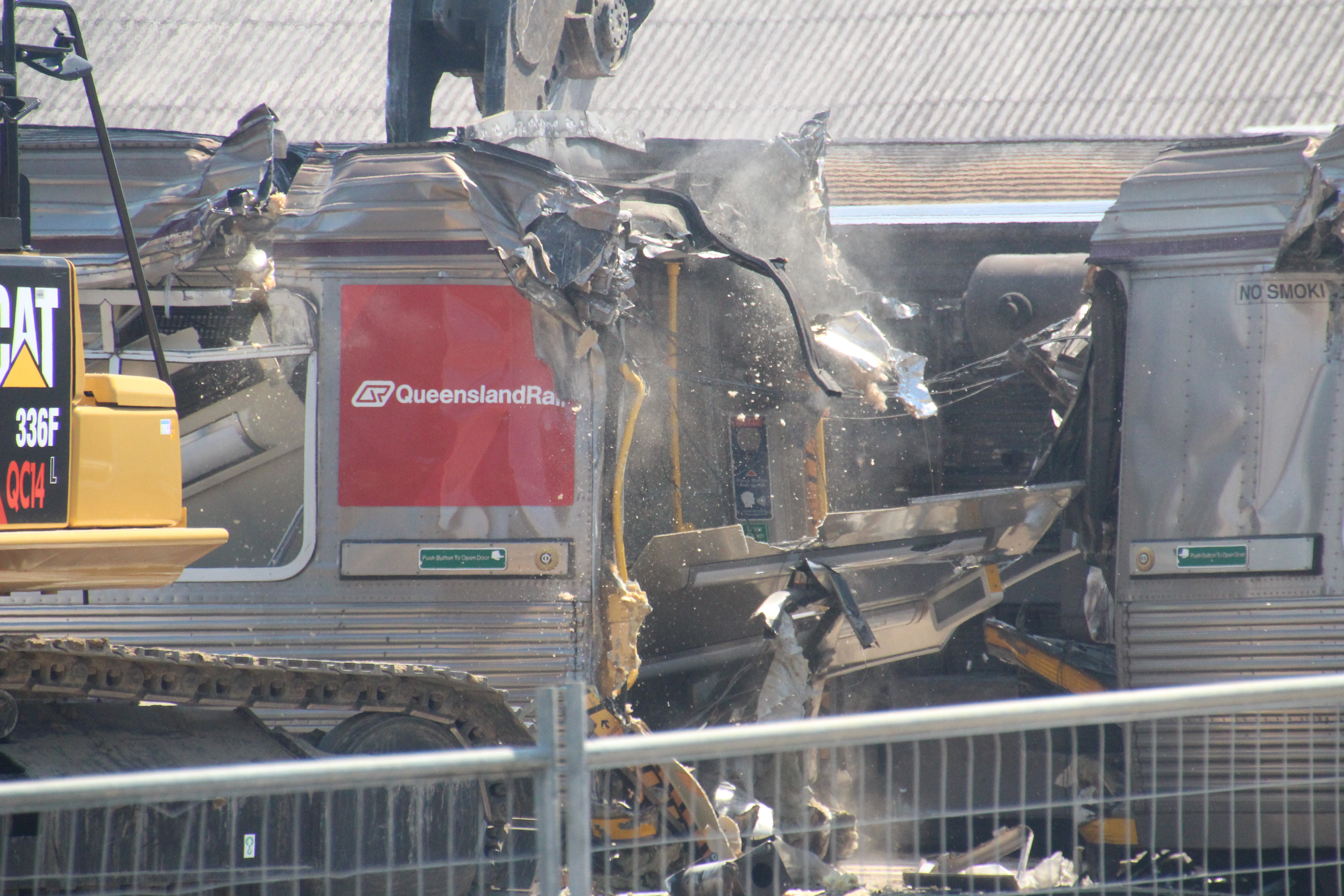
EMU 75 Car 1 (EM175) during the scrapping process

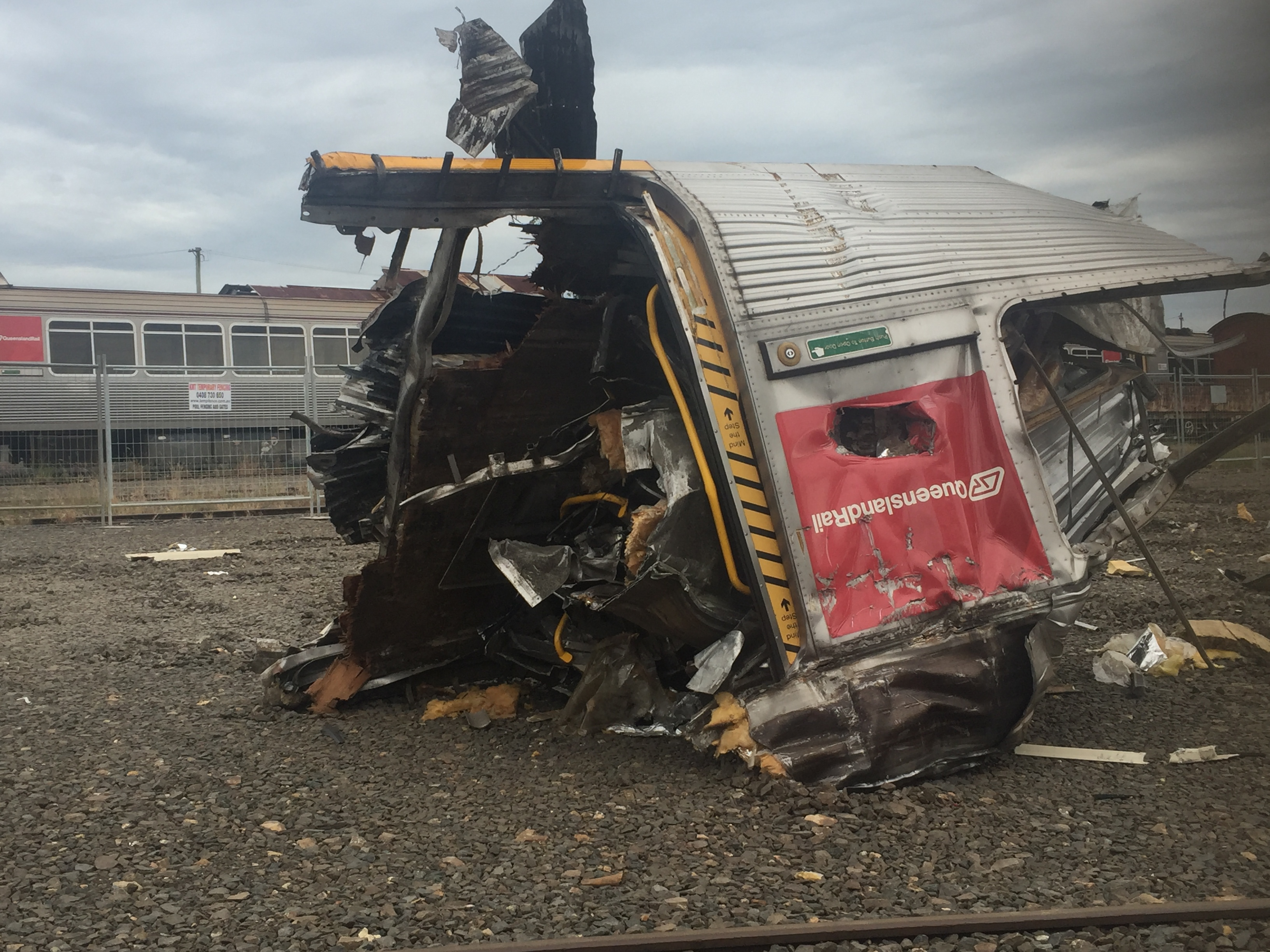
The remainder of EMU unit number 16

== Fleet ==
Year ordered	Number built	Fleet numbers	Notes
1977	13	01–13	All withdrawn and scrapped, excluding 01 and 04, stored at North Ipswich.
1979	11	14–24	All withdrawn and scrapped, excluding 21, used as a training simulator for QFD.
1980	16	25–40	All withdrawn and scrapped.
1980	20	60–79	All withdrawn and scrapped.
1983	16	41–56	All withdrawn and scrapped. Number 46 is currently stored in Gympie.
1984	8	81–88	All withdrawn and scrapped.
1985	4	57–59, 80	All withdrawn and scrapped, excluding 59.

== Nomenclature ==
"EMU" is derived from "electric multiple unit". Queensland Rail uses EMU (pronounced the same as emu) to refer to this specific model/class, not the general category. Internationally, EMU more commonly refers to the general category.

== Incidents ==
On 23 March 1985, two EMUs collided head-on near Trinder Park. A train driver and passenger were killed, and 31 others were injured. The units involved, EMU11 and EMU27, were both repaired by Walkers and returned to service in December 1985.

On 14 March 1996, EMU28 derailed after hitting a freight train near the former Mayne Junction station. EMU28 was later repaired and returned to service.

On 21 September 2001, a freight train hauled by 3906 derailed near Petrie and collided with two empty EMUs, EMU05 and EMU60. Two carriages from EMU05 and one carriage from EMU60 were condemned and scrapped, with the remaining car from EMU05 (EM305) replacing EM160. In 2020 EMU60 was scrapped.

== Gallery ==
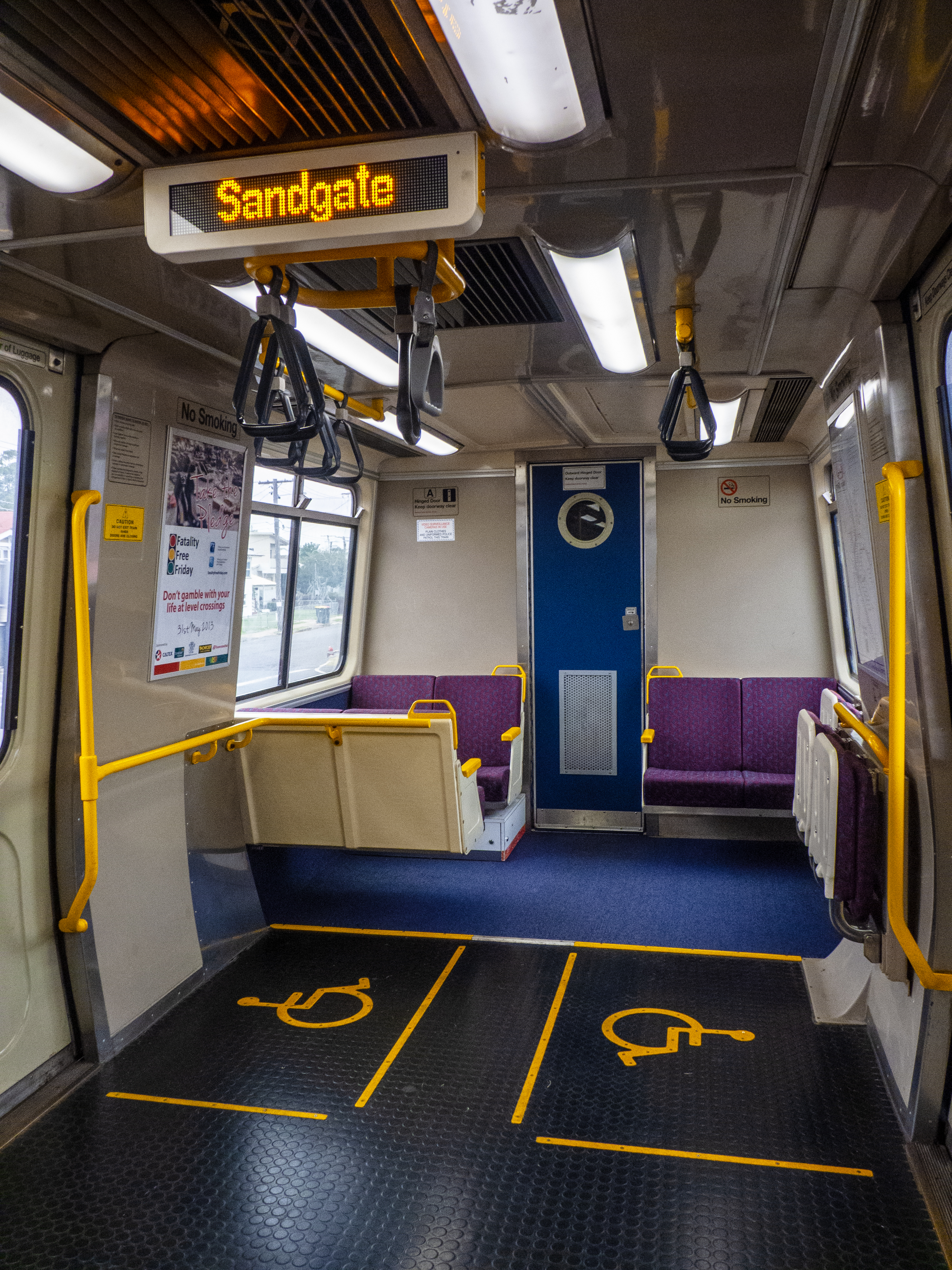
EMU passenger information display of next stop

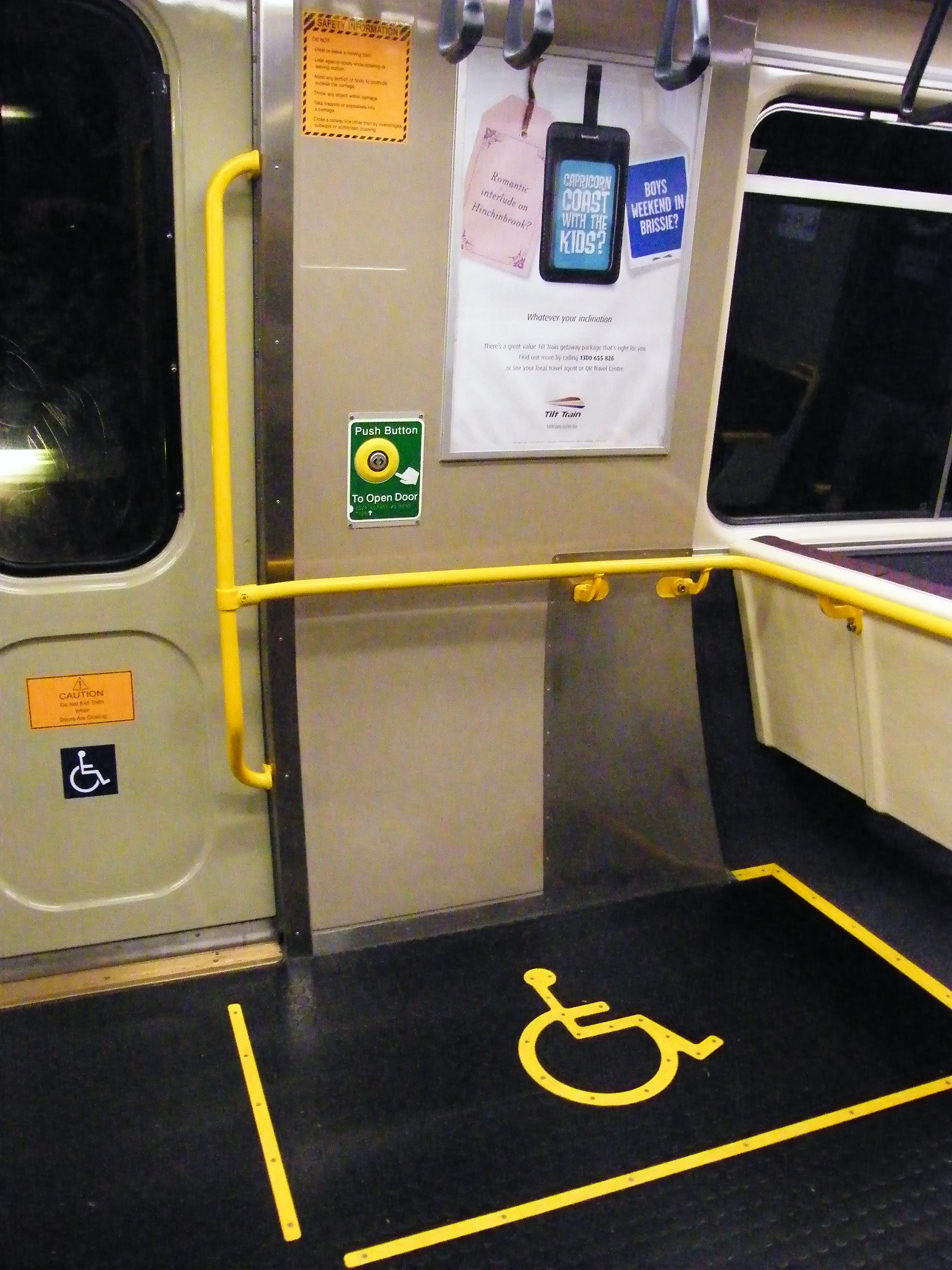
EMU allocated space

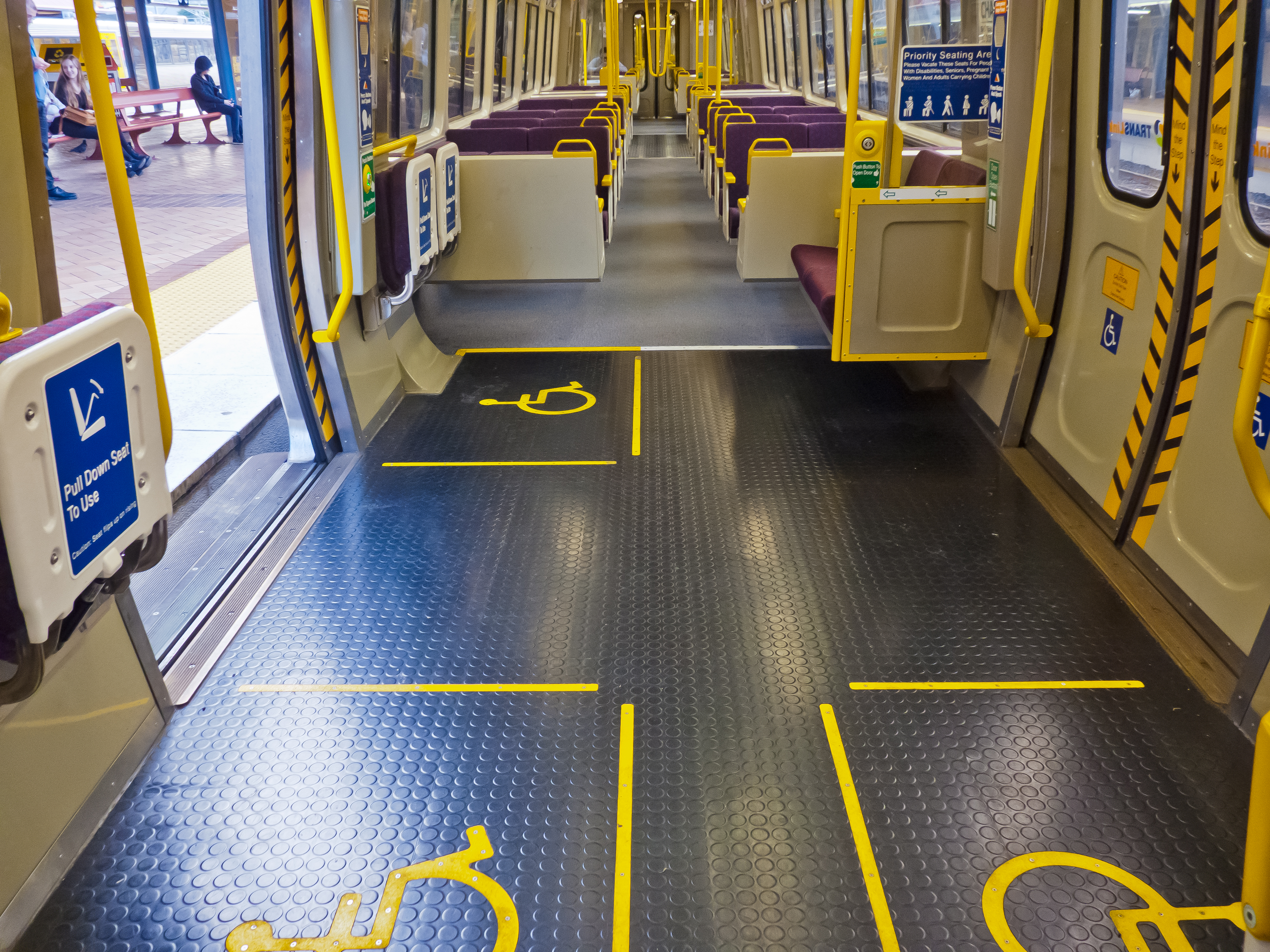
EMU allocated spaces, vestibule and priority seats

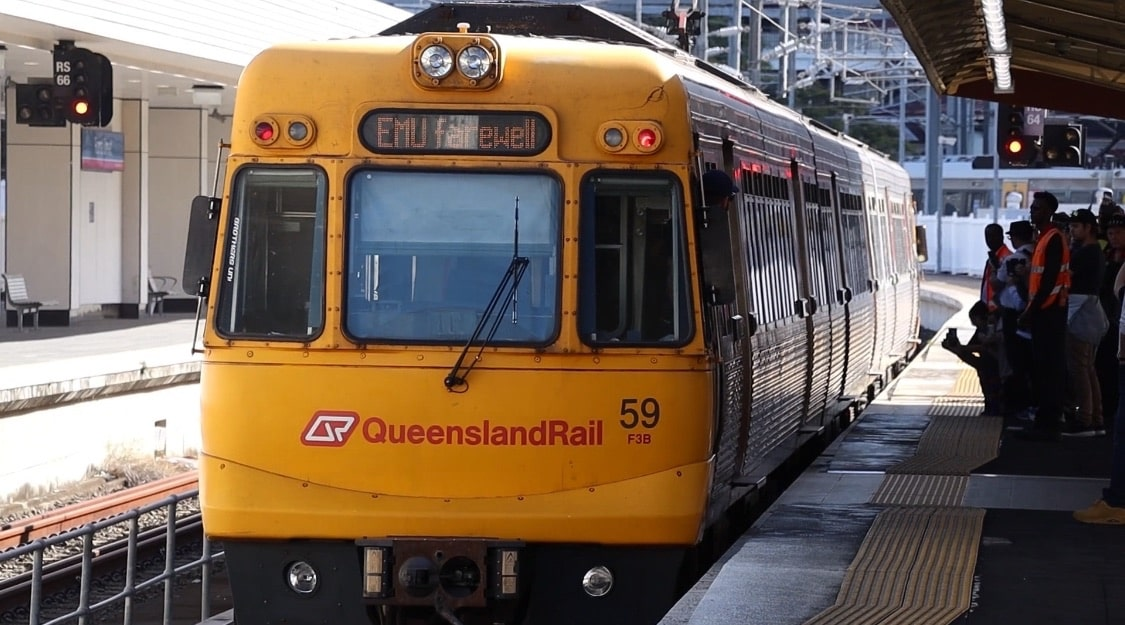
EMU 59 departing Roma Street station for the Farewell Tour
