= New Generation Rollingstock =

Train carriages used in Queensland, Australia

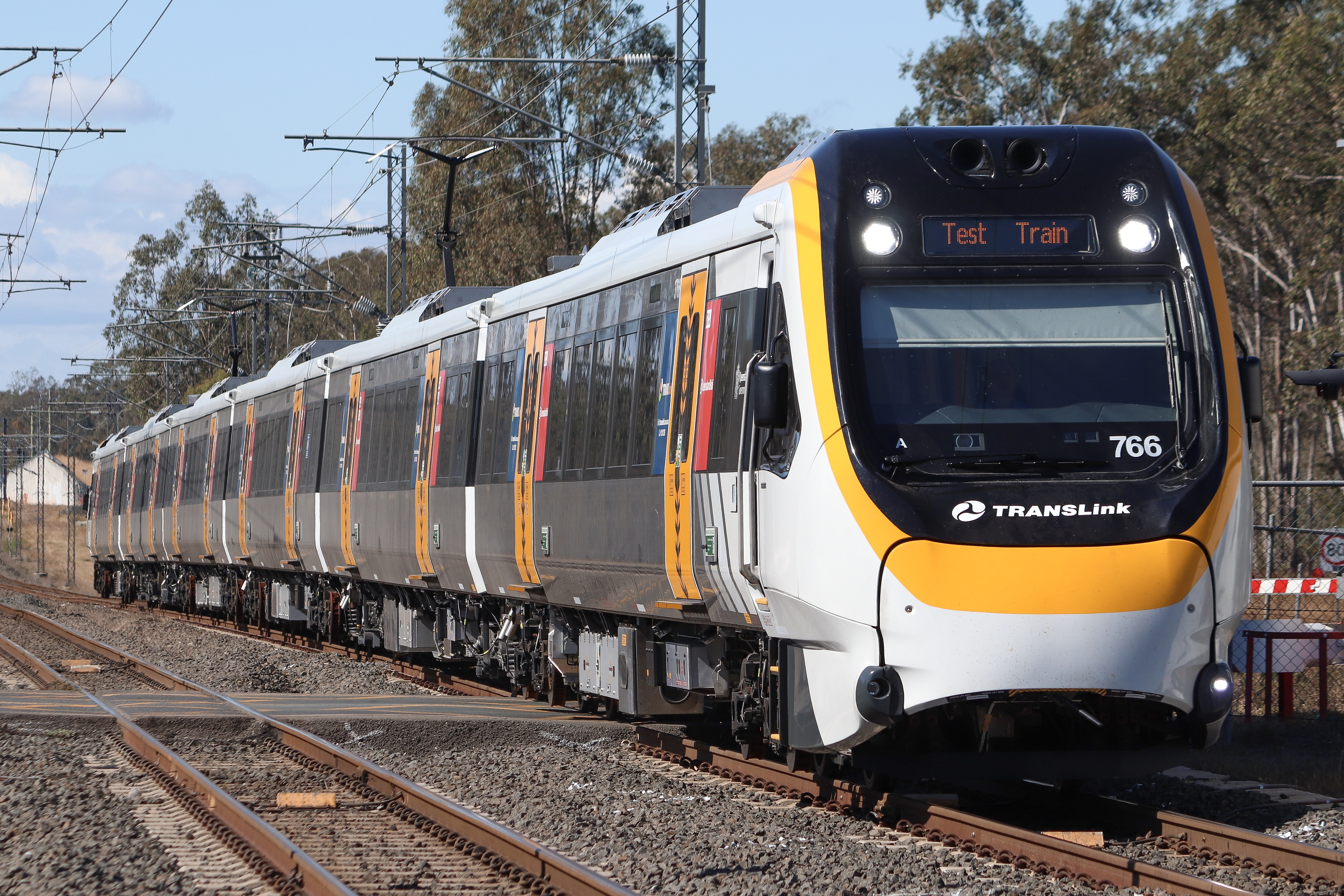
- NGR 766 at Karrabin station in July 2019

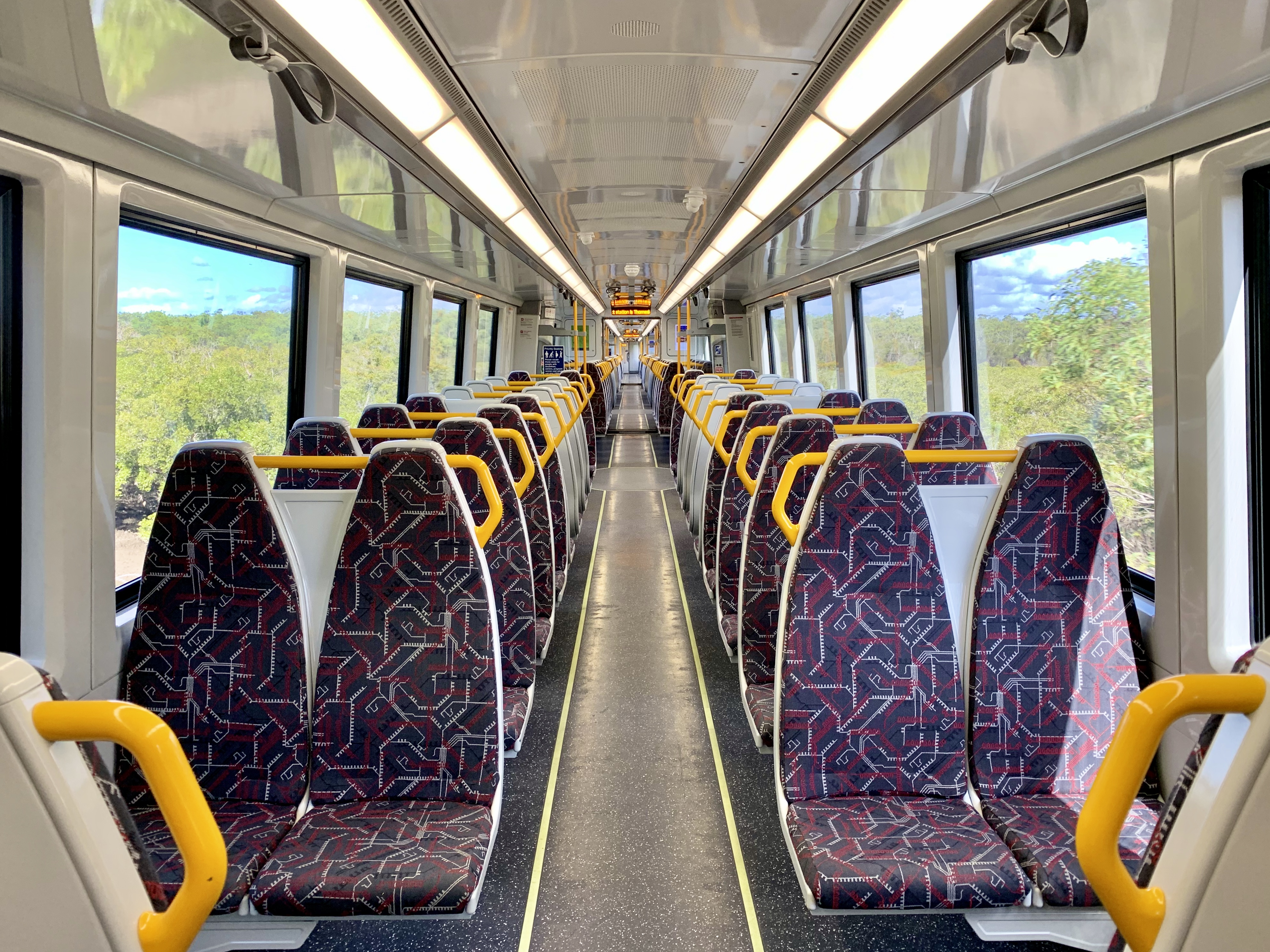
- Interior of an NGR
- Stock type: Electric multiple unit
- In service: 2017–present
- Manufacturer: Bombardier Transportation
- Built at: Savli, Gujarat, India
- Replaced: Electric Multiple Unit; InterCity Express
- Constructed: 2015–2019
- Entered service: December 2017
- Refurbished: 2019–2024 (accessibility)
- Number built: 75
- Number in service: 75
- Formation: 6-car sets
- Fleet numbers: 701–775
- Capacity: 964. Including 510 standing and 454 seating.
- Operator: Queensland Rail
- Depot: Wulkuraka
- Lines served: All except Ferny Grove, Beenleigh and Rosewood

Specifications
- Train length: 146.17 m (479 ft 7 in)
- Car length: 25.085 m (82 ft 3.6 in) (end cars); 24 m (78 ft 9 in) (intermediate cars)
- Width: 2,746 mm (9 ft 0.1 in) (including doors)
- Maximum speed: 140 km/h (87 mph)
- Traction system: IGBT–VVVF (Bombardier MITRAC)
- Traction motors: 3-phase AC induction motor
- Electric system: 25 kV 50 Hz AC (nominal) from overhead catenary
- Current collection: Pantograph
- UIC classification: Bo′Bo′+2′2′+Bo′Bo′+Bo′Bo′+2′2′+Bo′Bo′
- Bogies: Bombardier FLEXX
- Safety system: Automatic Warning System European Train Control System
- Coupling system: Dellner
- Track gauge: 1,067 mm (3 ft 6 in)

The New Generation Rollingstock (NGR) is a class of electric multiple unit manufactured by Bombardier Transportation in India for Queensland Rail between January 2014 and December 2019. They are the largest fleet of electric multiple units to be used in Queensland at 75 6-car sets.

== History ==
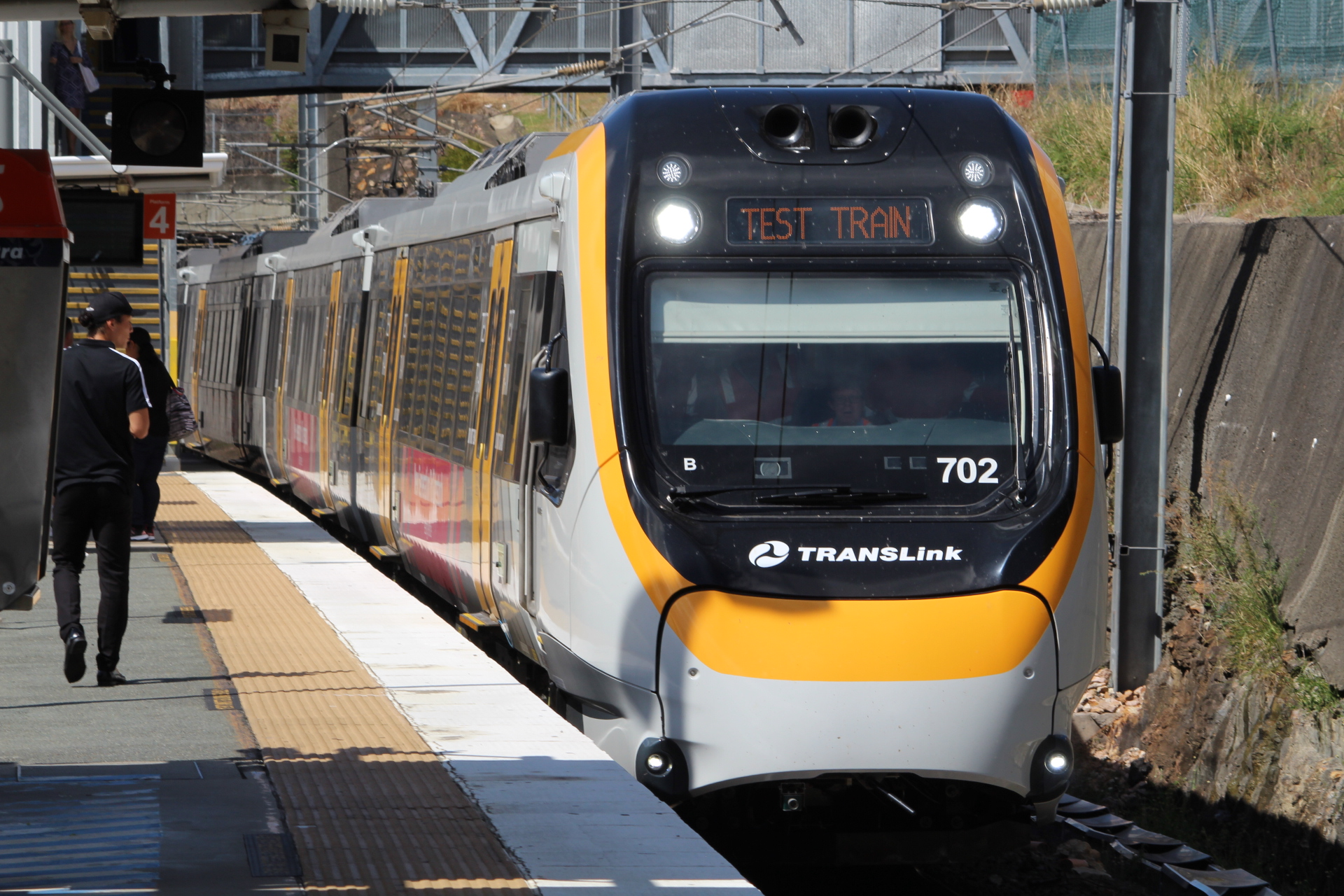
NGR 702 under test at Bowen Hills in March 2017

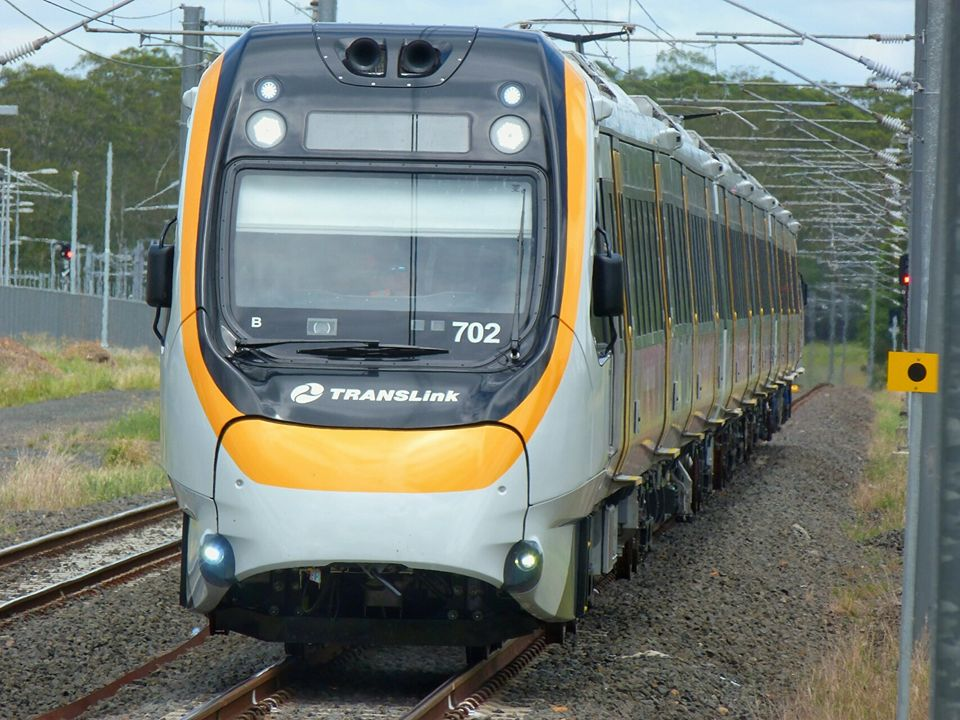
NGR 702 arriving at Wulkuraka in January 2017

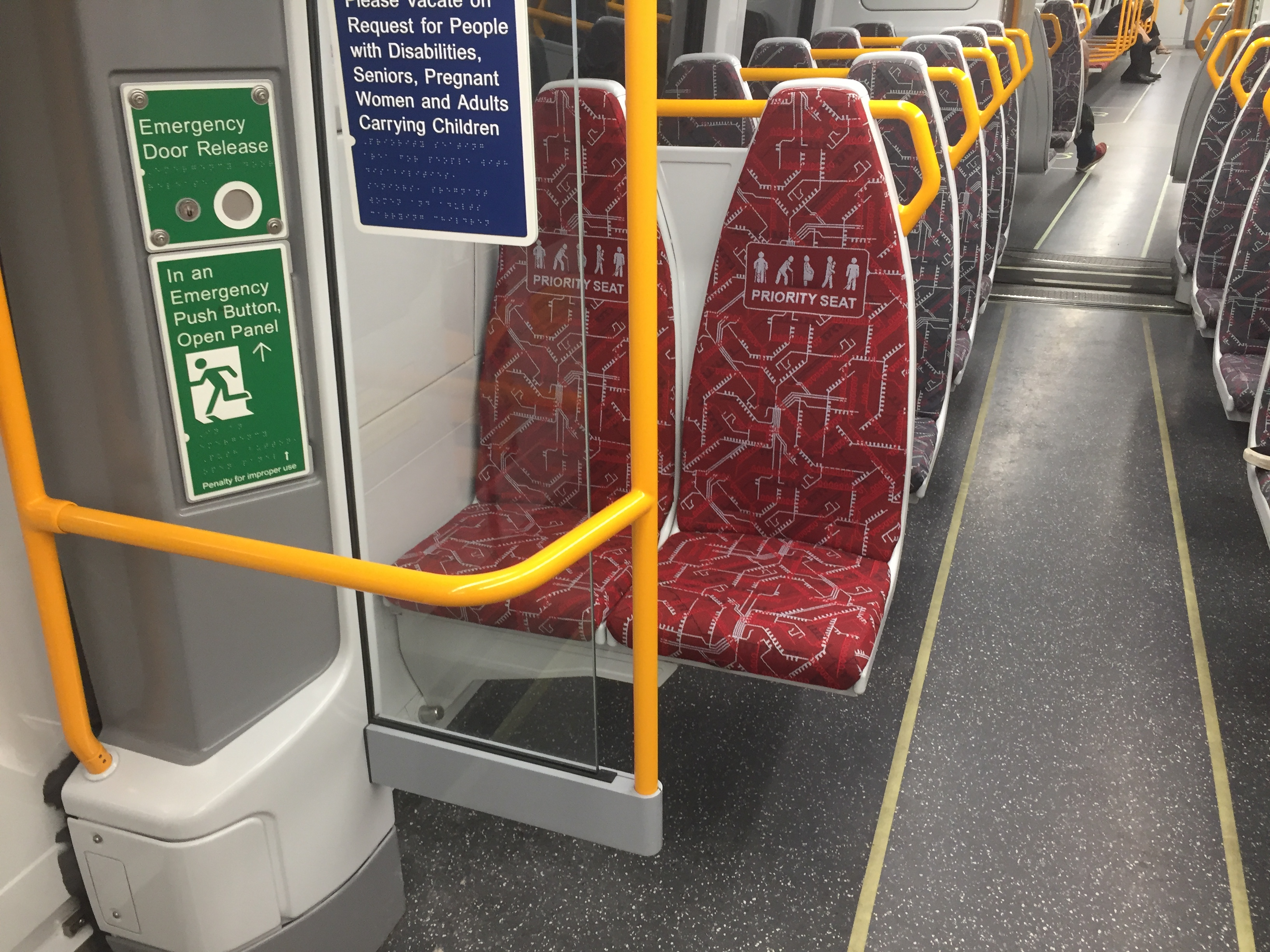
NGR 719 after the disability upgrade has been completed

In January 2014, the Queensland Government awarded a contract for 75 six-carriage electric multiple units to the Qtectic consortium of Aberdeen Asset Management, Bombardier Transportation, Itochu and John Laing under a 32-year public private partnership. The units were built in Savli, India. The units were Queensland Rail's first to be manufactured overseas instead of in Maryborough by Downer Rail (formerly Walkers). In February 2016, the first unit was delivered to the Port of Brisbane.

In December 2017, the first NGR entered service.

The fleet began operating on the Airport and Gold Coast lines. In May 2018, they began operating on the Doomben line. In September 2018, they began operating on the Redcliffe and Springfield lines. In October 2018, they began operating on the Ipswich and Caboolture lines. In February 2019, they began operating on the Shorncliffe and Cleveland lines. The same month, they became the largest fleet of electric multiple units in Queensland. In March 2020, they began operating on the Sunshine Coast line as far as Nambour.

In January 2020, the last NGR entered service.

The fleet are not yet permitted to operate on the Ferny Grove and Rosewood lines, due to loading gauge clearance issues and platform lengths, respectively.

Units 709 and 772 have had ETCS equipment installed and are currently being used to trial QR's ETCS infrastructure.

== Fleet ==
The NGR fleet is maintained at a purpose built depot to the west of Wulkuraka station.

The driving motor cars are fitted with nose cones for improved aerodynamic performance as opposed to the exposed Scharfenberg couplers used by previous Queensland Rail rolling stock. The body is made up of flat steel panels on the sides and corrugated steel panels on the roof. The units are compatible with the European Train Control System. The units are also noted to have gangway connection doors but are almost never used.

Each unit features high-backed seats, bike storage with safety straps, luggage space underneath the seats, accessible toilets with baby changing table, free WiFi and CCTV.

=== Formation ===
Each unit comprises two driving motor cars (prefixes 3 and 8), two trailer cars (prefixes 4 and 7) and two intermediate motor cars (prefixes 5 and 6). Units are permanently coupled six-car sets, so passengers are able to walk the entire length of the train, eliminating the need to couple with another unit. Guards travel at the rear as opposed to the middle on the existing fleet, where two three-car units couple to form a six-car unit.

Car No.	1	2	3	4	5	6
Designation	Driving motor	Trailer (pantograph)	Motor (toilet, wheelchair space)	Motor (toilet, wheelchair space)	Trailer (pantograph)	Driving motor
Numbering	8745	7745	6745	5745	4745	3745

== Nomenclature ==
As the name suggests, "New Generation Rollingstock" was chosen to reflect the next generation of electric multiple units being built to serve the Queensland Rail network. The delivery of the NGR fleet ultimately allowed for the withdrawal of the InterCity Express and Electric Multiple Unit fleets in 2021 and 2025, respectively.

== Accessibility ==
The trains received media attention over a series of issues such as the toilet module size falling short by 12 mm (0.47 in), and the inability for a wheelchair to access the toilet from one of the two accessible cars.

Work to rectify the non-compliant parts of the trains was performed by Downer Rail's Maryborough facility. After an exemption application to the Australian Human Rights Commission was rejected, the need for rectification was clear. It was determined that the position of the boarding ramps next to the train door was the reason for the toilet module not meeting DDA's minimum size requirements. The first, 735, arrived at Maryborough for rectification work in January 2019 and the last, 771, in late April 2024. The project was completed in July 2024.

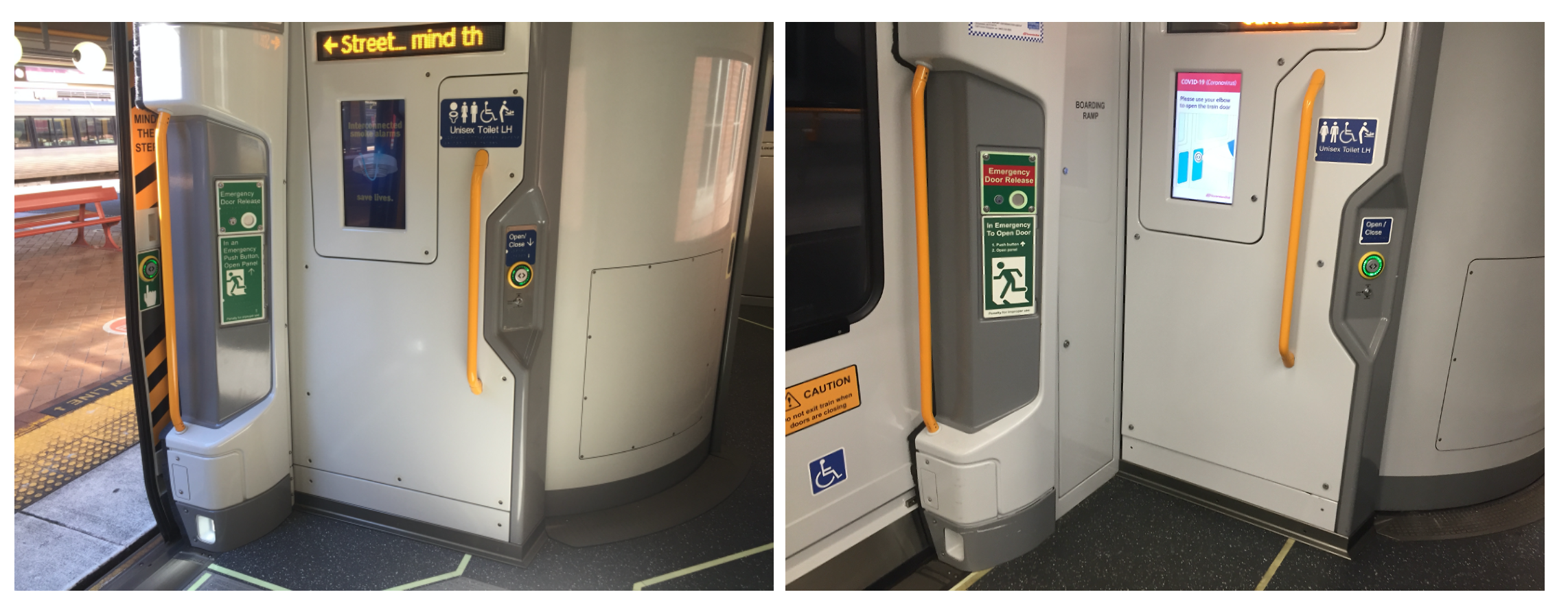
The new toilet module (left) versus the original toilet module (right). The original module was further back with a portable boarding ramp in the cabinet between it and the external doors. The boarding ramp is now in the electrical cabinets behind the module.

The rectification work solved the disability access problem by providing a toilet module for both centre (wheelchair accessible) cars. This means that wheelchairs were no longer expected to travel around the toilets to access them from behind. No major changes were made to the general seating other than recovering seats near the doors with priority labelling including some transverse seats.

More help points were added in the space between the two toilet modules.

The toilet modules were made disability compliant by moving the toilet front side and door at least 12 mm (0.47 in) closer to the external doors, while leaving the toilet bowl in the original location. Labelling and other minor changes were made in the toilet module as well, such as the installation of lights that warn in the event of an evacuation.

Some changes were made to signage throughout the train on the advice of disability groups; purportedly as "better wording" but the differences would be minor to the average person – intended instead for the minority of people with literacy difficulties (see difference between green emergency door release wording above).

== Gallery ==
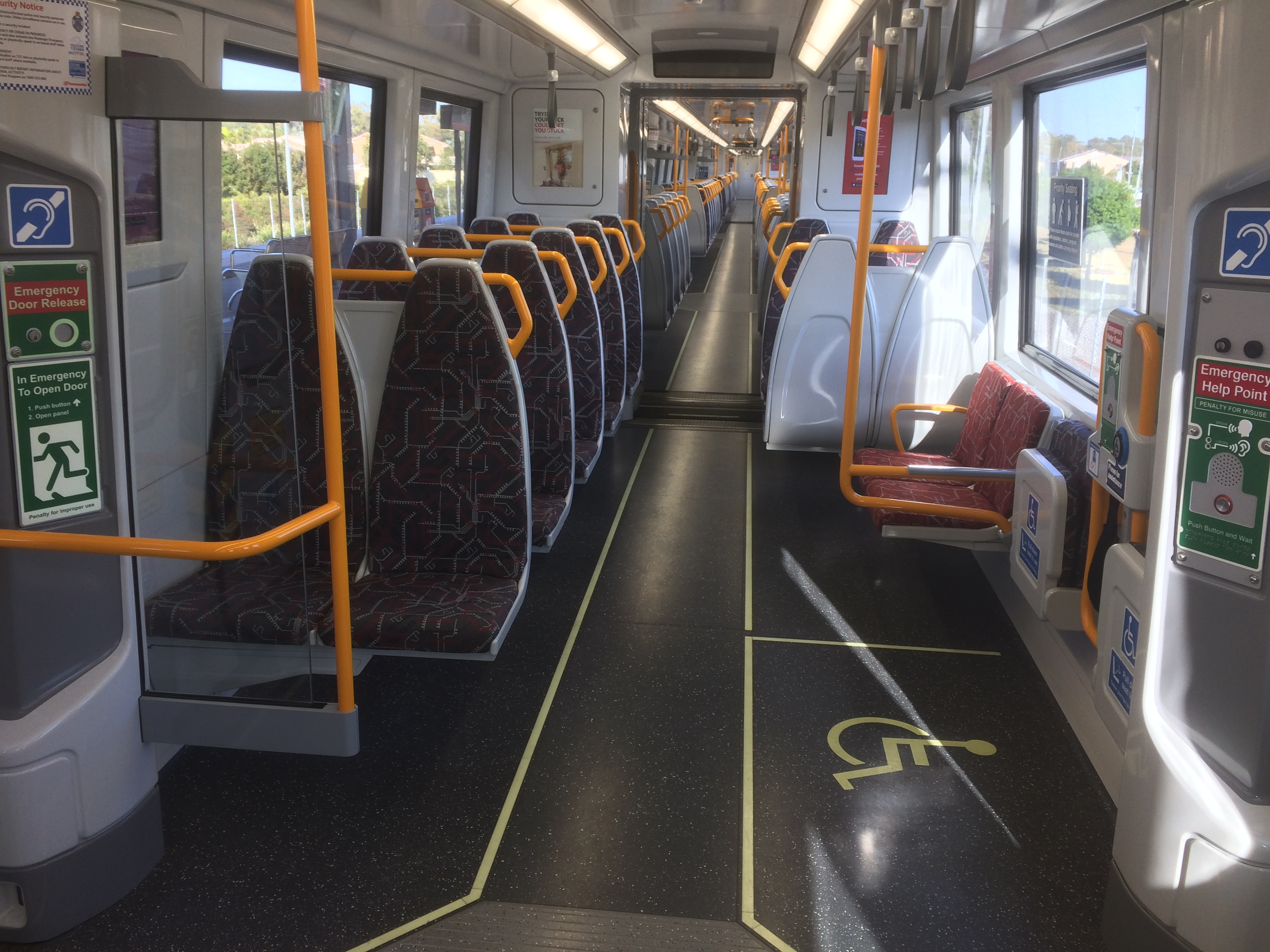
The original layout of the NGR's Wheelchair accessible car without a toilet. Each of these cars was modified between 2020 and 2024 to be identical to the modified toilet cars.

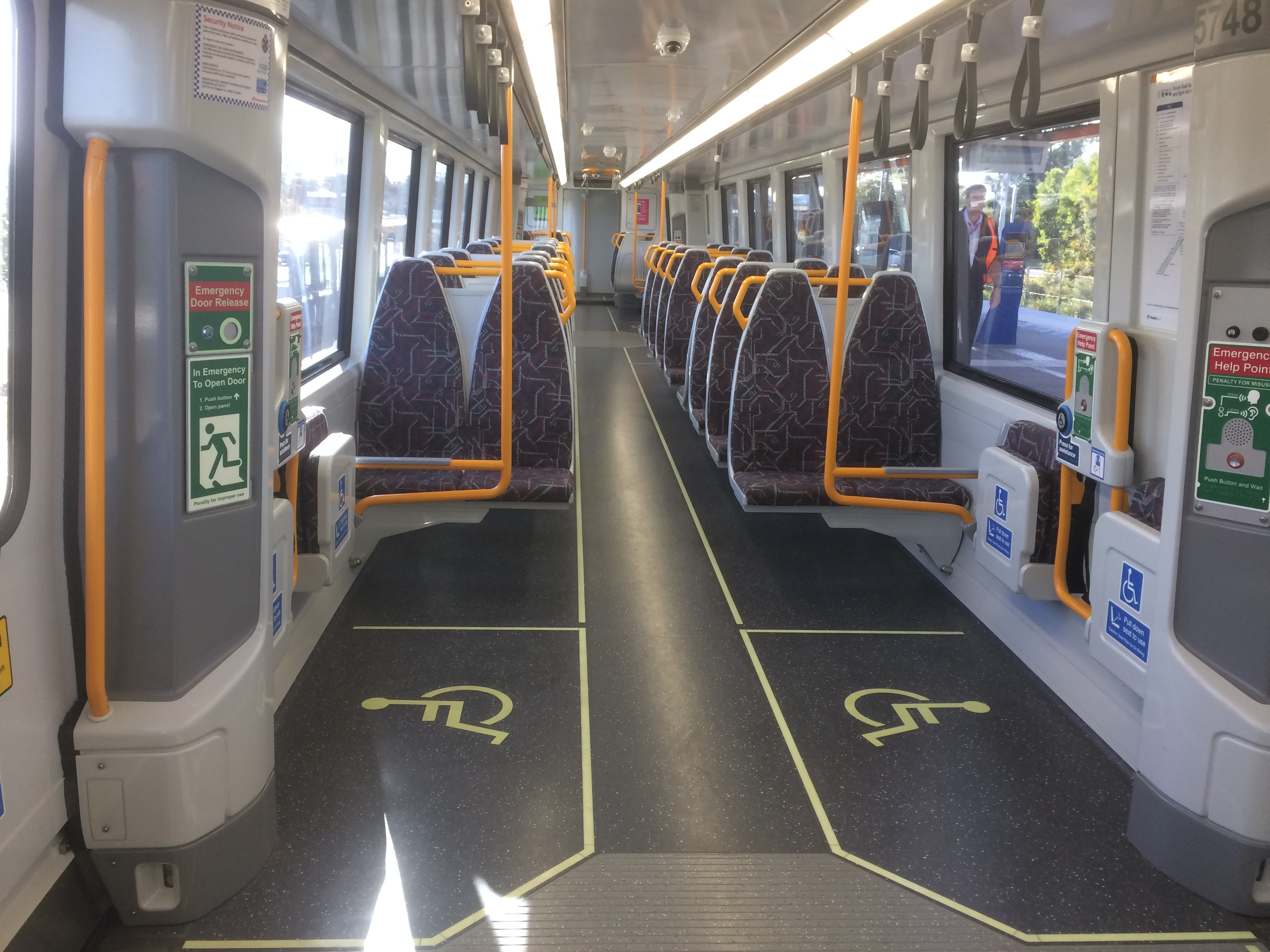
The original layout of the NGR's Wheelchair accessible car without a toilet. Each of these cars was modified between 2020 and 2024 to be identical to the modified toilet cars.

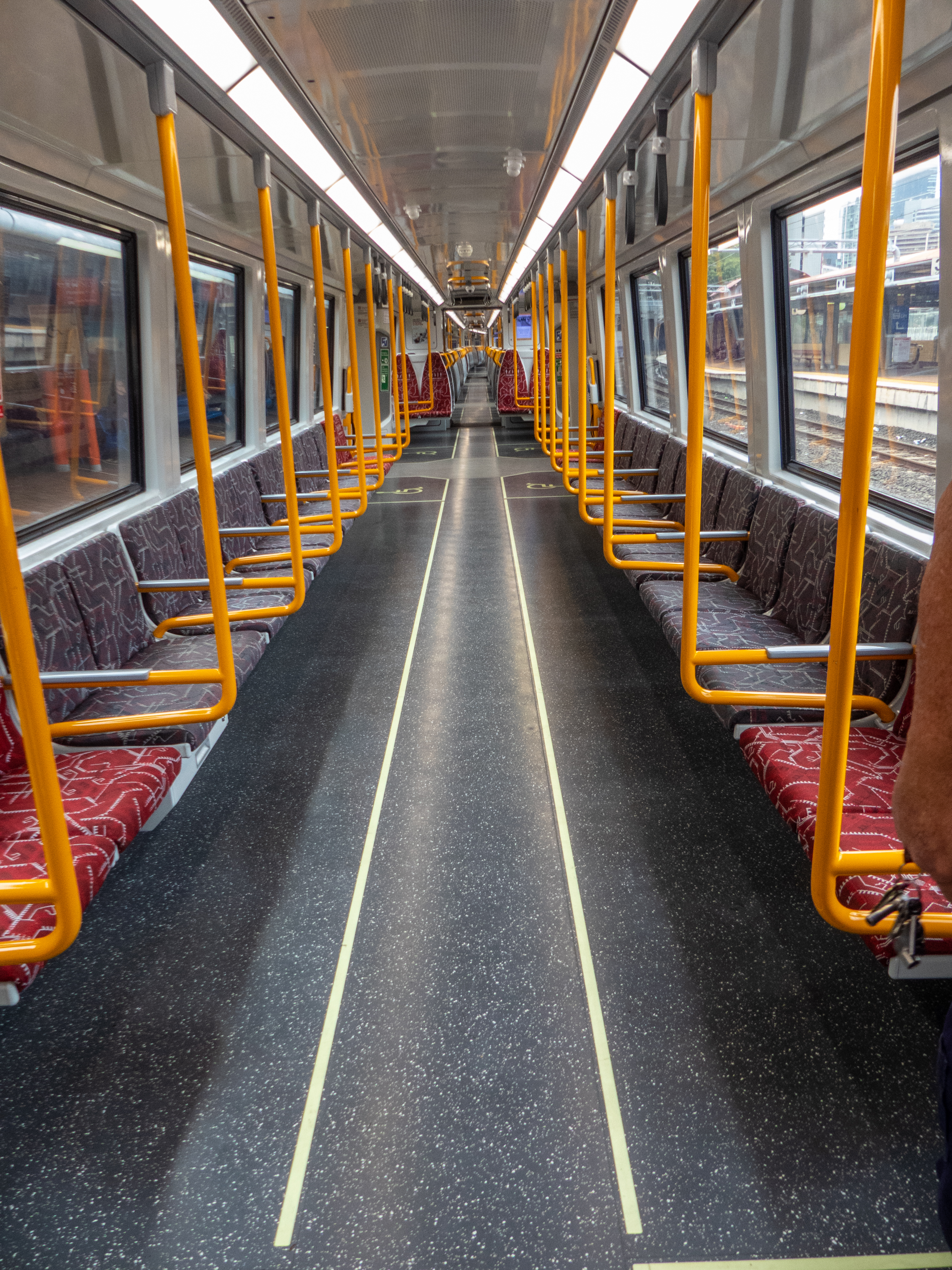
NGR (refurbished) MA Carriage longitudinal seating with priority seats coloured red

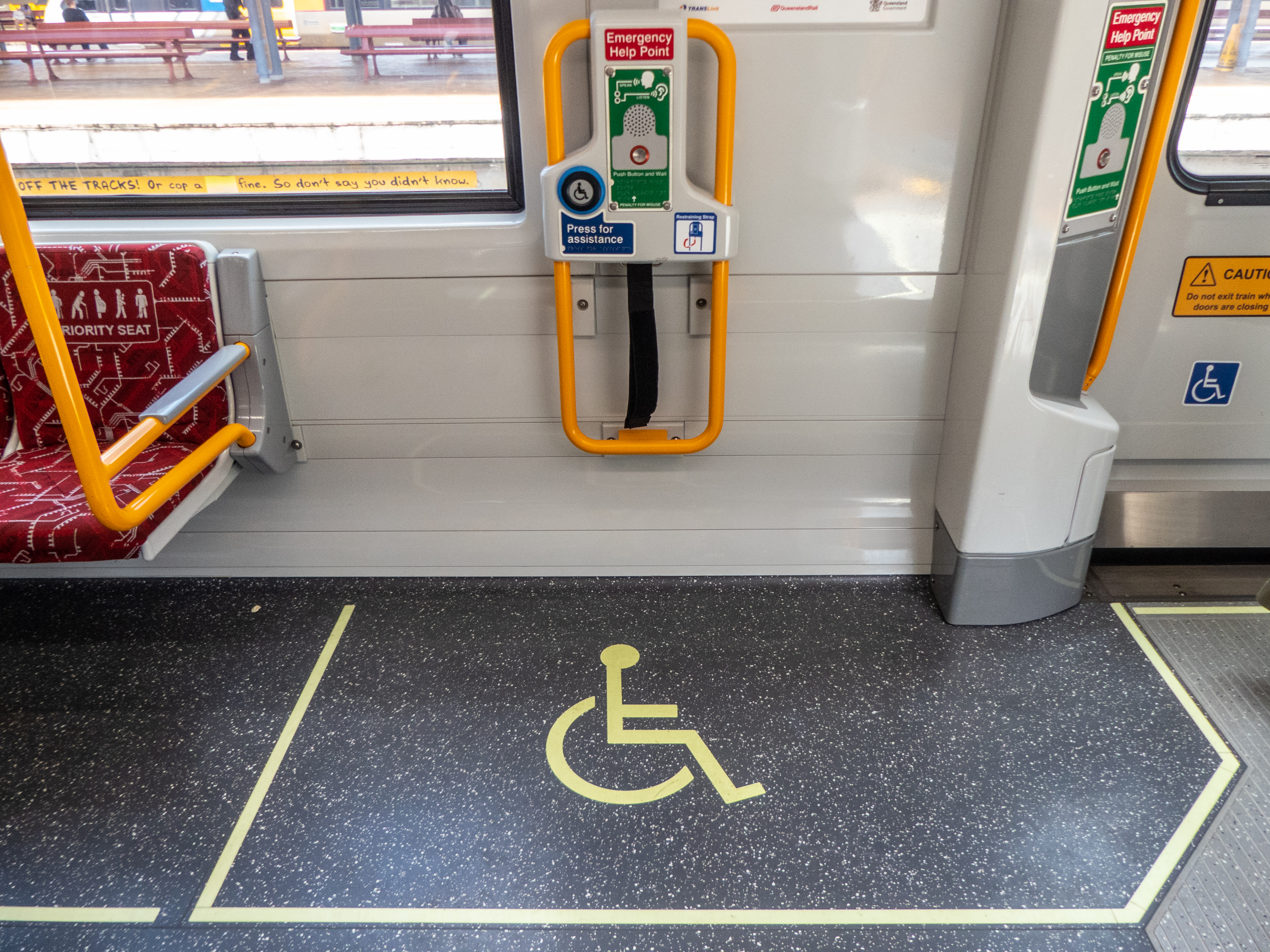
NGR (refurbished) MA Carriage allocated space and communication devices

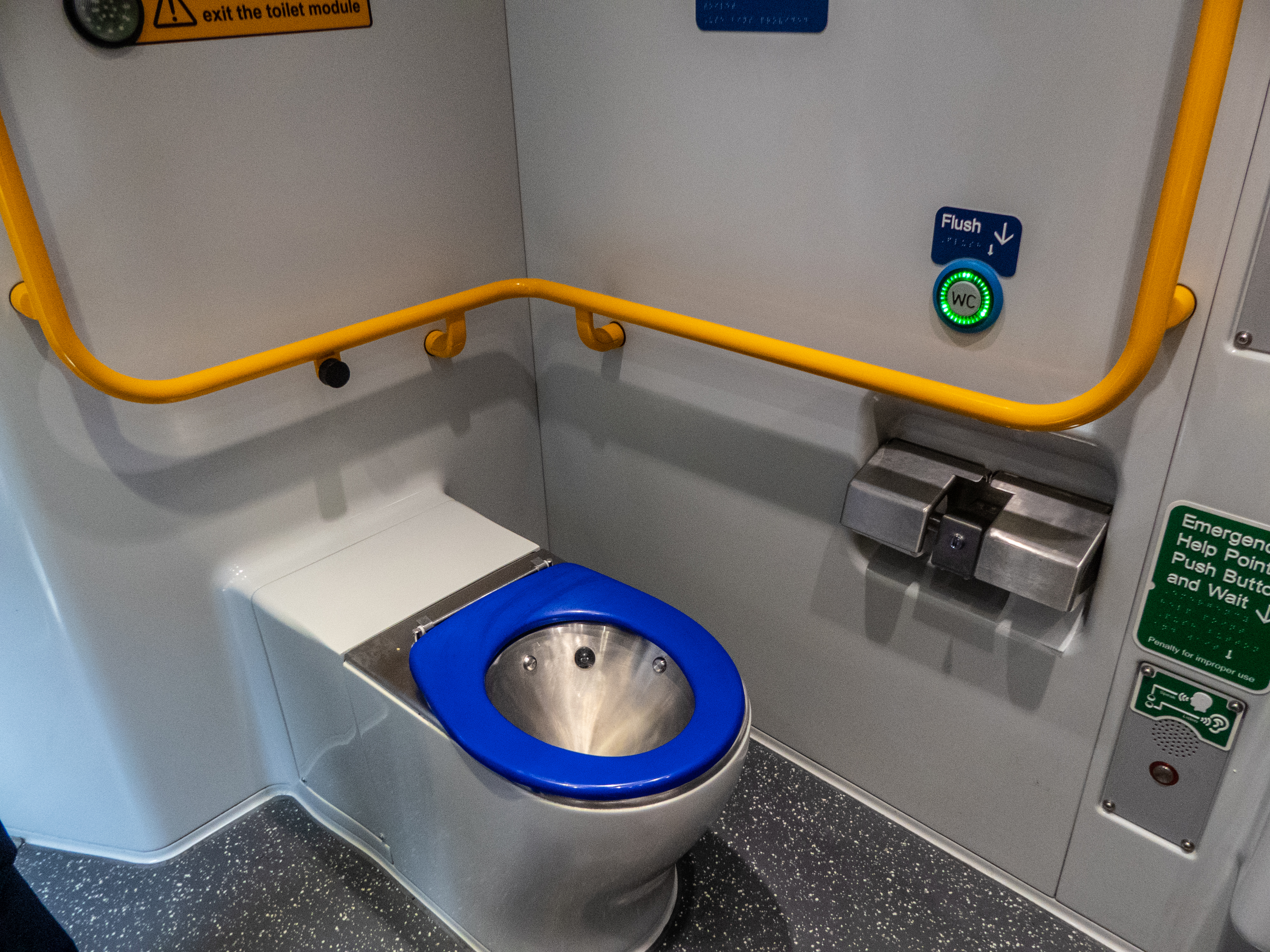
NGR (refurbished) MA Carriage toilet pan and flush control

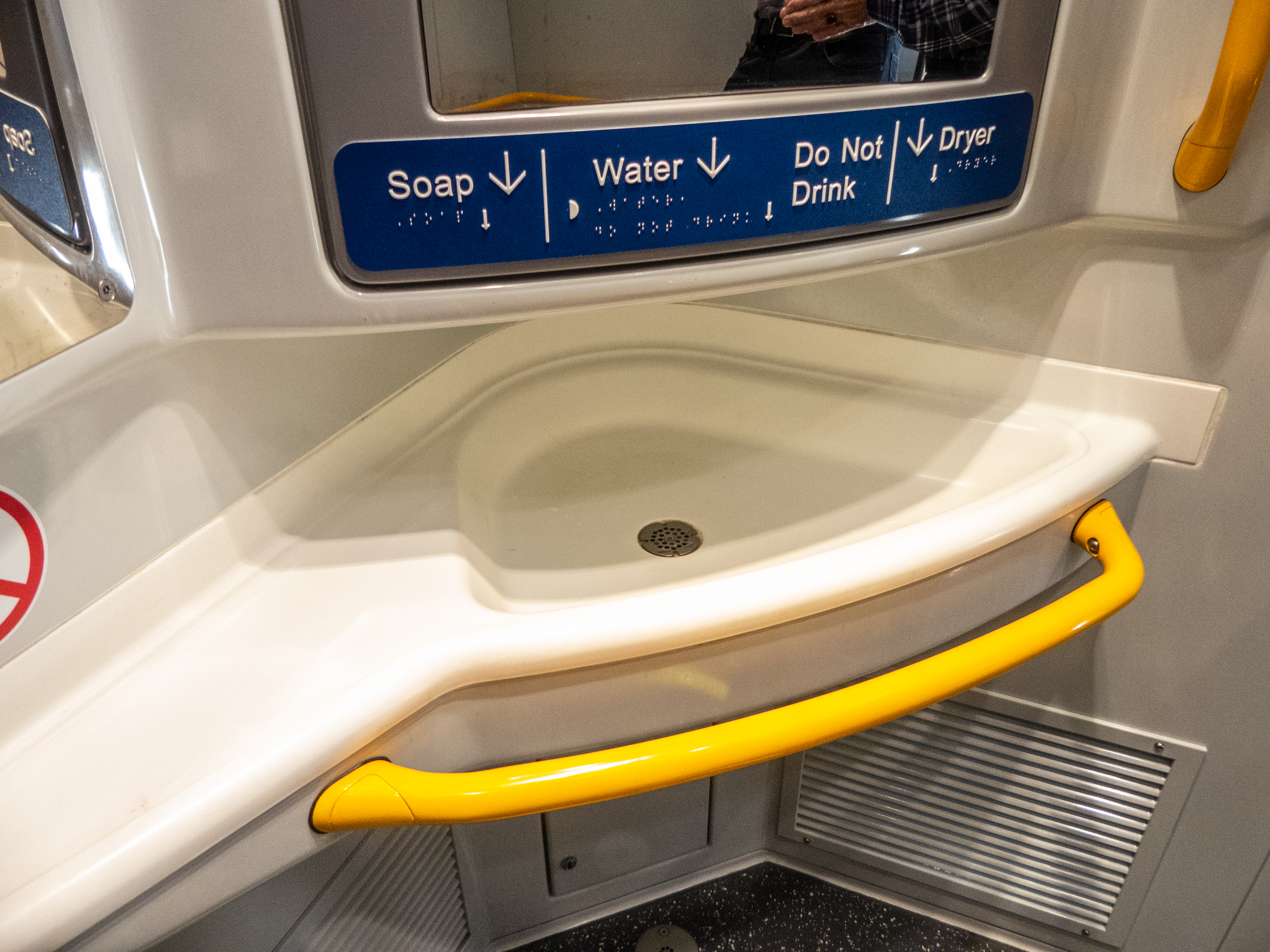
NGR (refurbished) MA Carriage toilet washbasin and sensor controls
