= InterCity Express (Queensland Rail) =

Class of electric train cars

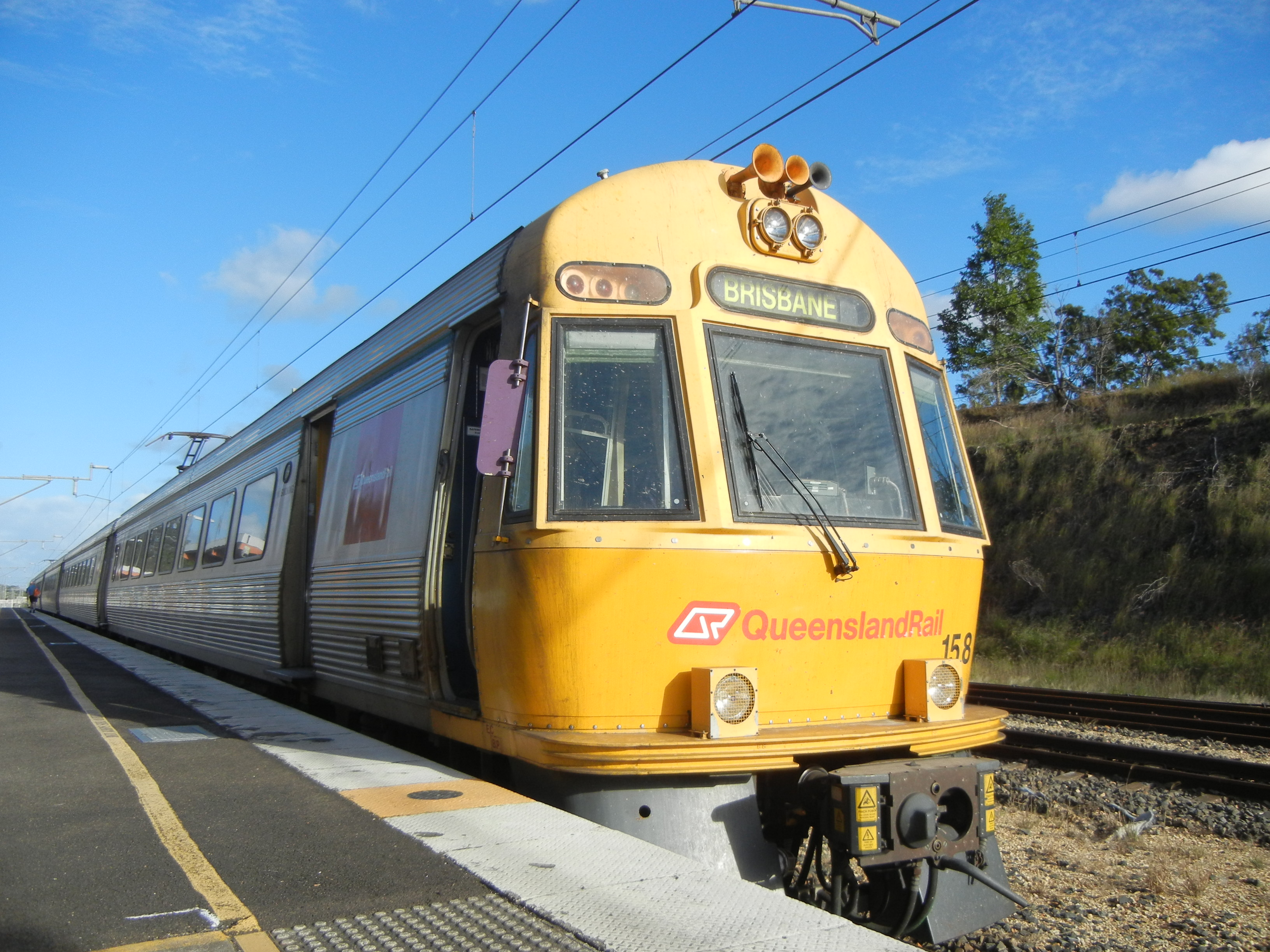
- ICE 158 at Gympie North station in May 2018

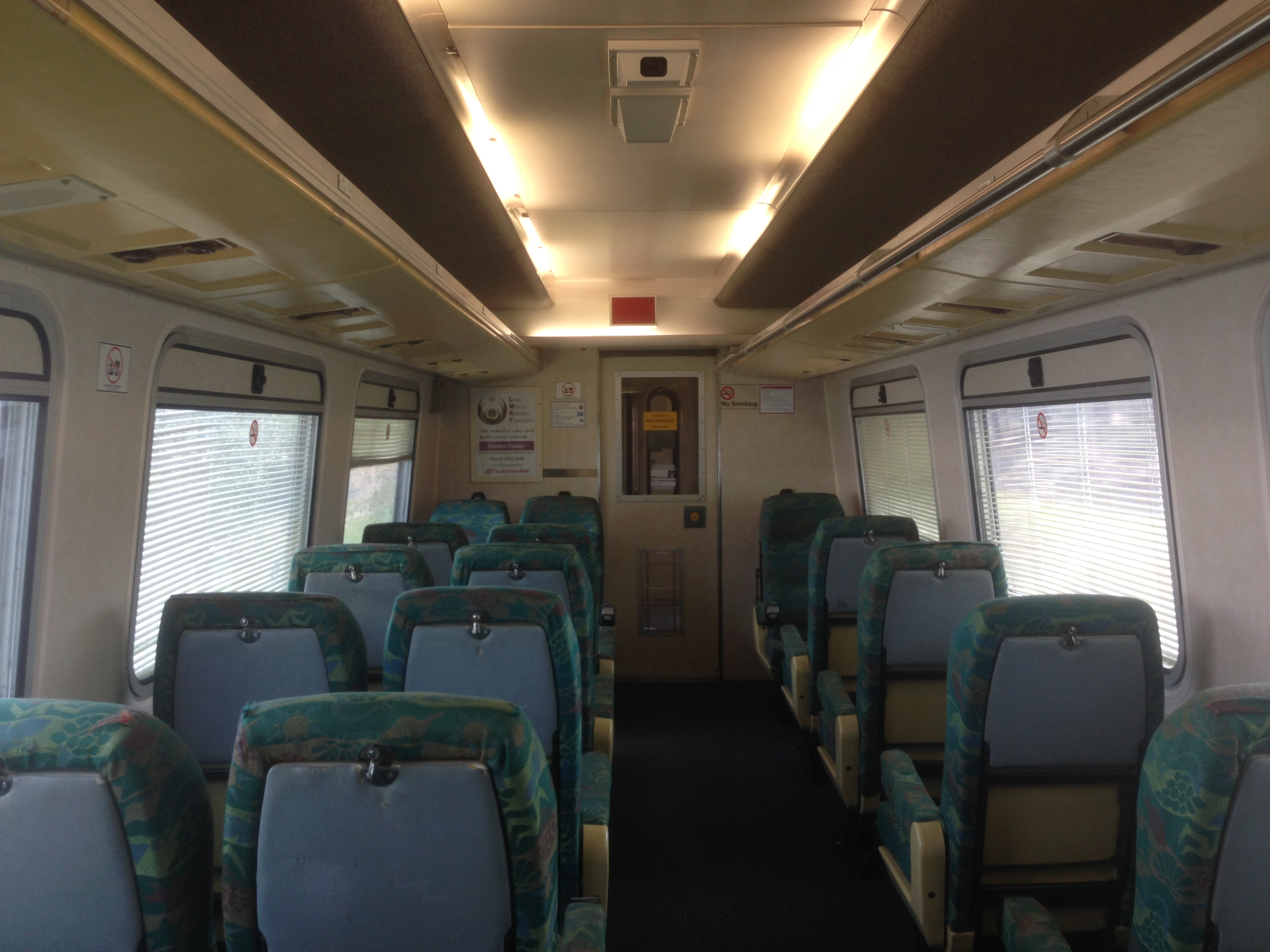
- Interior of an ICE
- Stock type: Electric multiple unit
- In service: 1988–2021
- Manufacturer: Walkers
- Built at: Maryborough
- Constructed: 1987–1989
- Entered service: 1988
- Number built: 20 carriages
- Successor: New Generation Rollingstock
- Formation: 4–6 carriage sets
- Fleet numbers: 151–158
- Capacity: 222 per 5-carriage set +4 wheelchair spaces
- Operator: Queensland Rail
- Depot: Mayne
- Line served: Sunshine Coast (Roma Street to Gympie North)

Specifications
- Train length: 95.6 m (313 ft 8 in)
- Car length: 23.4 m (76 ft 9 in) (EMD); 23.1 m (75 ft 9 in) (EMM/EMT)
- Width: 2.72 m (8 ft 11 in)
- Height: 3.9 m (12 ft 10 in)
- Doors: Manual open, auto-swing close
- Wheel diameter: 840 mm (33 in)
- Maximum speed: 120 km/h (75 mph)
- Weight: 194 t (191 long tons; 214 short tons) 3-carriage set
- Traction system: ABB thyristor–phase-fired controller
- Traction motors: 16 × 135 kW (181 hp) separately excited DC motor
- Power output: 2.16 MW (2,900 hp)
- Electric system: 25 kV 50 Hz AC (nominal) from overhead catenary
- Current collection: Pantograph
- UIC classification: Bo′Bo′+Bo′Bo′(+2′2′(+2′2′))+Bo′Bo′+Bo′Bo′
- Multiple working: Within type; With EMU
- Track gauge: 1,067 mm (3 ft 6 in)

The InterCity Express (ICE) is a retired class of electric multiple unit manufactured by Walkers in Maryborough for Queensland Rail between 1988 and 1989. They were operated on the Spirit of Capricorn service until 2003 and the Sunshine Coast line service until 2021. They were retired from the Queensland Rail network in 2021.

== History ==
=== Introduction ===
To operate the Spirit of Capricorn between Brisbane and Rockhampton on the North Coast line that was in the process of being electrified, in 1987 Queensland Rail ordered 16 electric multiple unit carriages from Walkers. They were to be eight semi-permanently coupled pairs of a driving motor car (EMD) and a non-driving motor car (EMM) that were planned to operate as four-carriage sets. Electrical equipment was provided by ASEA (later ABB). In 1988 an additional four trailer cars (EMT) were ordered to allow the sets to be built up to five or six carriages.

The first trials were conducted in May 1988, before the first entered service on Sunshine Coast line services from Brisbane to Nambour, operating in multiple with Electric Multiple Units. On 5 February 1989, they began to operate through to Gympie North. On 3 July 1989, they began operating Spirit of Capricorn services to Rockhampton.

In 1998, the faster Electric Tilt Train replaced most Spirit of Capricorn services, with a Saturdays only service continuing. They briefly operated on the Gold Coast line following its extension to Nerang in May 1998 and Robina in November 1998. They were used on the Corinda-Yeerongpilly line from January 2000 after the withdrawal of the Queensland Railways 2000 class rail motor.

In 2001, all were fitted with power-operated doors. With the withdrawal of the remaining Spirit of Capricorn service from May 2003, they ceased operating north of Gympie North. The mid-2000s saw the sets retrofitted with ditch lights on top of the anticlimber.

=== Retirement ===
All units were eventually replaced by the New Generation Rollingstock. In January 2019, the first unit was withdrawn. In November 2021, the last unit was withdrawn. Since withdrawal, units 153 and 157 have been stored at North Ipswich Railway Workshops.

== Fleet ==
Type	Classification	Number built	Fleet numbers
Driving motor car	EMD	8	5151–5158
Non-driving motor car	EMM	8	6151–6158
Trailer	EMT	4	7151–7154

Each half-set numbered 151–158, comprised a semi-permanently coupled driving motor car (EMD) and a non-driving motor car (EMM) that could be built up to five or six carriages with the addition of trailer cars (EMT). In their later years they generally operated as five car sets. In November 1990 an eight car set was operated.

== Nomenclature ==
Driving motor cars 5155 and 5156 were named City of Brisbane and City of Rockhampton to mark the commencement of the Spirit of Capricorn service in July 1989.

== Gallery ==
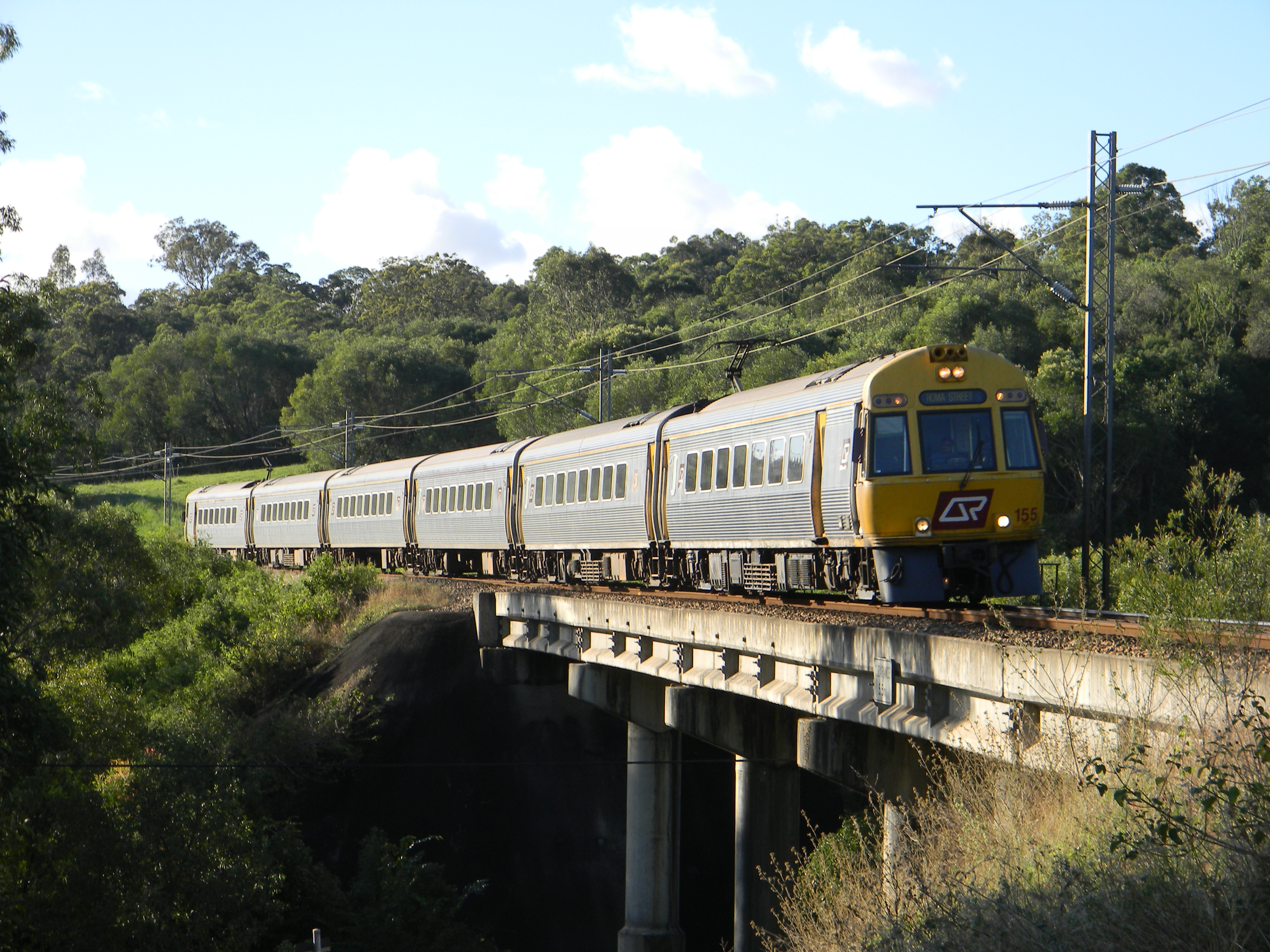
ICE 155 departing Gympie North station

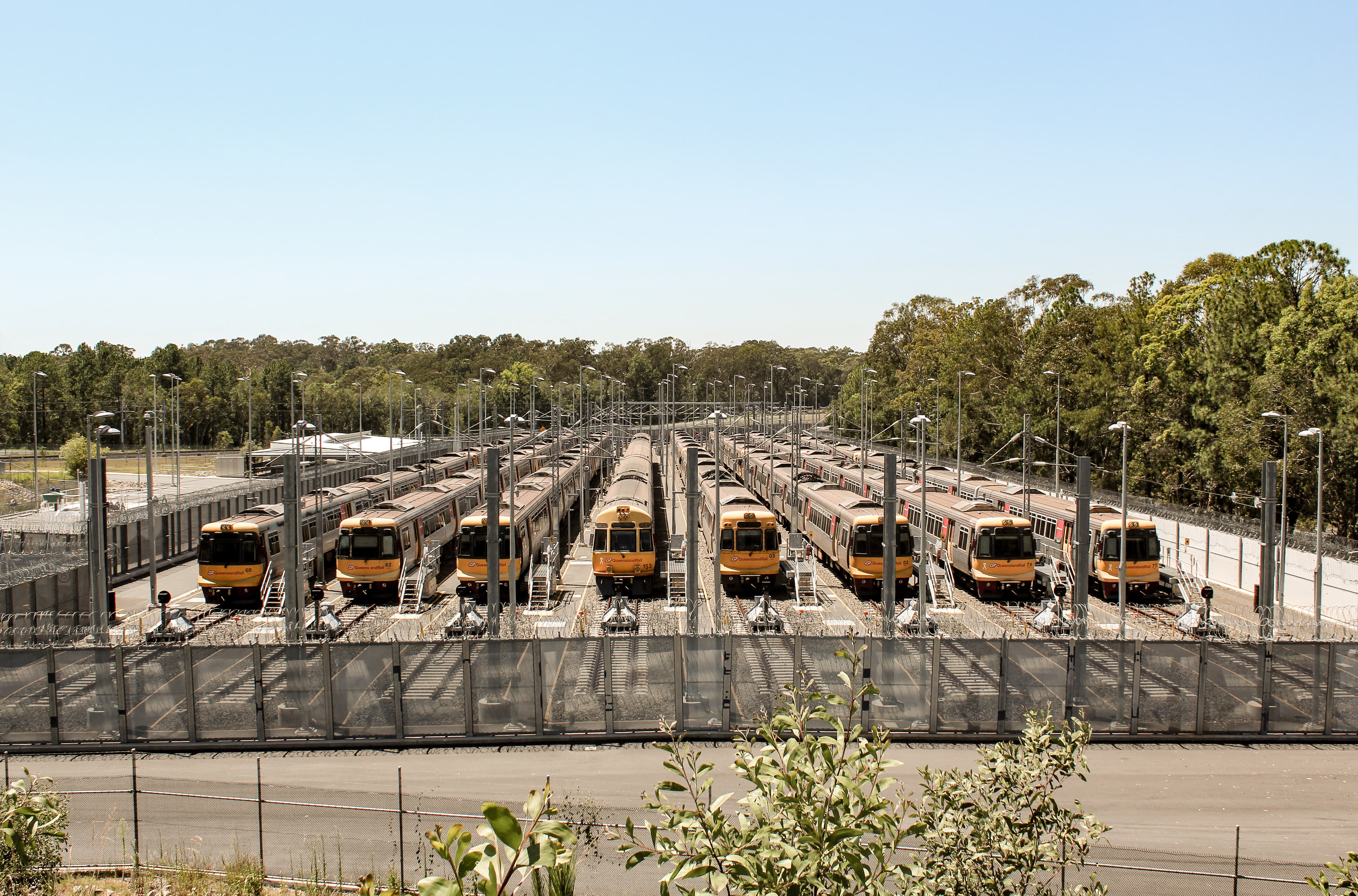
ICE unit alongside EMU units
