= Lia Ices =

American singer-songwriter

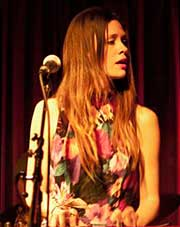

Background information
- Birth name: Lia Kessel
- Born: Chicago, Illinois, United States
- Instrument(s): Vocals, keyboards
- Years active: 2008–present
- Labels: Jagjaguwar
- Website: www.liaices.com

Lia Ices is an American singer-songwriter from Westport, Connecticut, currently living in Northern California. While she has been performing and recording for several years, Ices gained prominence when her song "Love is Won", from her second studio album Grown Unknown, was played over the closing credits of the second-to-last episode of season one of HBO's Girls on June 10, 2012.

== Early life ==
Ices was born Lia Kessel around 1985 in Chicago, Illinois. Her mother is a photographer and book binder, and Ices says that her father has been a source of musical inspiration throughout her life, encouraging her to write her own songs from an early age. She began playing the piano at age five, studied theatre at the preparatory high school Walnut Hill School for the Arts and went on to explore the worlds of dance and theater at the Experimental Theatre Wing of New York University Tisch School of the Arts, and by studying Shakespeare at the Royal Academy of Dramatic Art in London. Kessel's brother, Eliot, is also a musician, and a collaborator in her music.

== Music ==
In 2008, her first album, Necima, was released in September of that year, produced by Nicolas Vernhes at Rare Book Room Studios in Brooklyn, New York. The music webzine Pitchfork wrote of the album: "When Ices and Vernhes find a creative symbiosis, usually on the record's shorter, pop-leaning tracks, the results are spectacular." Critics compared her singing favorably to that of Kate Bush, and more contemporary artists such as Feist and Bat for Lashes, as well as Tori Amos and Cat Power.

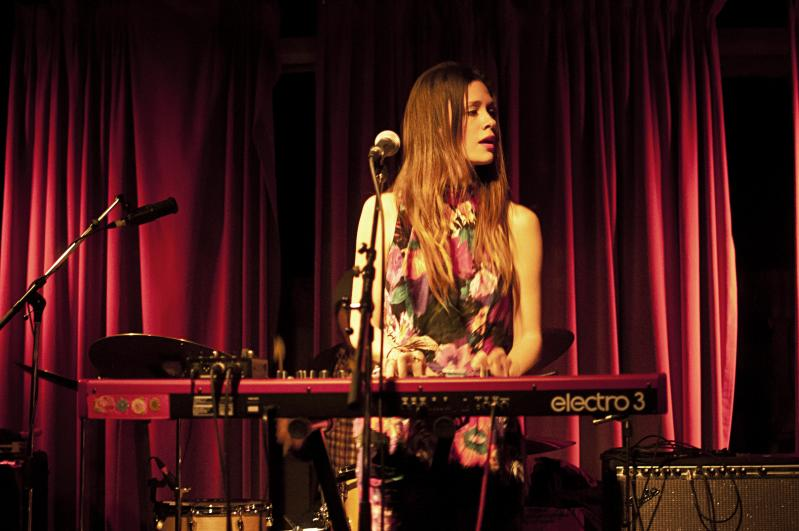
Lia Ices at the Drake Hotel, Toronto, April 2011

In early 2011, Ices released her second album, Grown Unknown, which was again mixed at the Rare Book Room Studios in Brooklyn, but released through her new label, Jagjaguwar Records. She spent six months in Vermont writing most of the album, and recorded the album at The Clubhouse in Rhinebeck, New York. The album's second track, "Daphne", features a duet with Bon Iver frontman, Justin Vernon. Critics found her voice more relaxed than on her debut album.

On April 3, 2012, Jagjaguwar Records released a 7" single of Ices covering Pink Floyd's "Wish You Were Here," taken from Mojo magazine's Pink Floyd October 2011 special edition. The B-side was another cover, of Syd Barrett's "Late Night". Her album, Ices, followed in September 2014. After a spell concentrating on her growing family, Ices released her latest offering, Family Album, in January 2021.

== Discography ==
=== Albums ===
| Title | Album details |
|---|---|
| Necima | Released: September 9, 2008; Label: Rare Book Room Records; Format: CD, Digital Download, LP |
| Grown Unknown | Released: January 24, 2011; Label: Jagjaguwar; Format: CD, Digital Download, LP |
| Ices | Released: September 16, 2014; Label: Jagjaguwar; Format: CD, Digital Download, LP |
| Family Album | Released: January 29, 2021; Label: Natural Music; Format: Digital Download |

=== Singles ===
- "Wish You Were Here" (Jagjaguwar)
  - Released: April 3, 2012
  - Format: Digital Download, 7" Single
- "Waves 2" (Natural Music)
  - Released: July 19, 2019
  - Format: Digital Download, Digital Stream
