= The Ice Organisation =

- Industry: Loyalty programme
- Founded: 15 November 2006; 18 years ago
- Headquarters: Tunbridge Wells, United Kingdom
- Key people: Jude Thorne (CEO); Michael Baulk (Chairman); Tessa Tennant (President)
- Website: myice.com

The Ice Organisation was a UK Loyalty programme. Ice promoted brands, goods and services that are more sustainable, with the aim of mitigating climate change through mass consumer purchase power. Like other loyalty schemes, customers were rewarded with Ice points which they earned when shopping with a retailer who is part of the programme. Customers could spend their points at Ice retailers for money off their purchases or get it for free. Depending on the retailer, customers could collect and spend Ice points either online, via the telephone or in-store.

The Ice Organisation was run by Jude Thorne (CEO, former CEO of Airmiles), Michael Baulk (chairman, former chairman and chief executive of AMV plc from Jan 1997 to 2006) and Tessa Tennant (president, co-founder of the UK Social Investment Forum, and the Carbon Disclosure Project) and the scheme tried to make people think about the environmental impacts of their shopping baskets and rewarded them for making more environmentally friendly purchases.

== Environmental credentials ==
The Ice Organisation believe that together with their customers and partner businesses, they can make a real difference to mitigate climate change. They assess all the businesses they partner with and only work with businesses that are doing the bit for the environment.
