= Ices (album) =

Studio album by Lia Ices
- Released: September 16, 2014
- Genre: Rock
- Length: 43:29
- Label: Jagjaguwar

Lia Ices chronology
Grown Unknown (2011)	Ices (2014)

Professional ratings
Aggregate scores
Source	Rating
Metacritic	60/100
Review scores
Source	Rating
AllMusic	2.5/5 stars
PopMatters	8/10

Ices is the third studio album by American singer Lia Ices. It was released on September 16, 2014, by Jagjaguwar Records.

== Track listing ==
No.	Title	Length
1.	"Tell Me"	3:56
2.	"Thousand Eyes"	4:05
3.	"Higher"	3:25
4.	"Love Ices Over"	5:1
5.	"Magick"	4:01
6.	"Electric Arc"	4:08
7.	"Sweet as Ice"	3:42
8.	"Creature"	4:26
9.	"How We Are"	3:37
10.	"Waves"	6:58
