= Brisbane Valley railway line =

Closed railway line in Queensland, Australia

Brisbane Valley Line
- Brisbane Valley Line in locator map

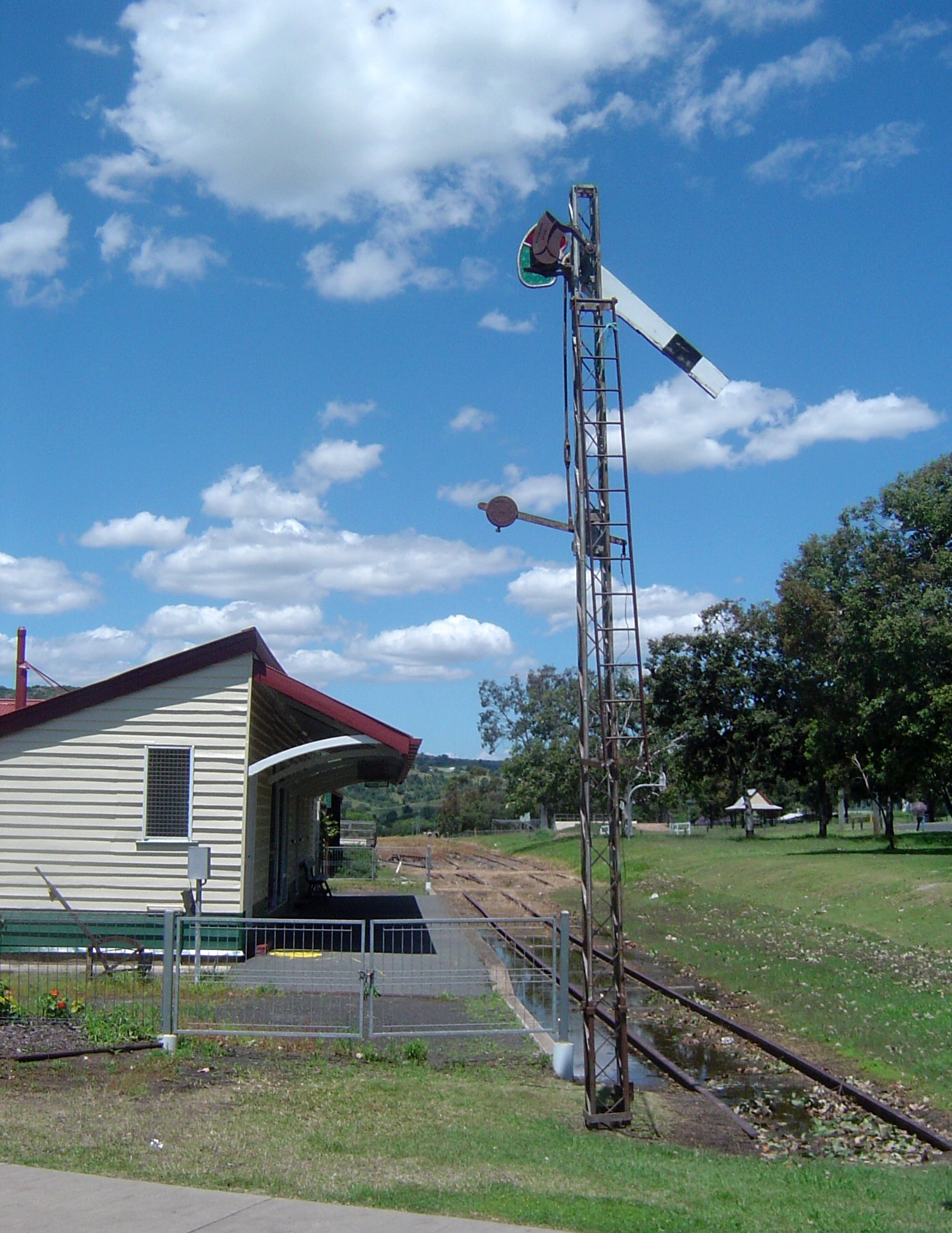
- Abandoned station and track at Lowood

Overview
- Locale: Queensland, Australia

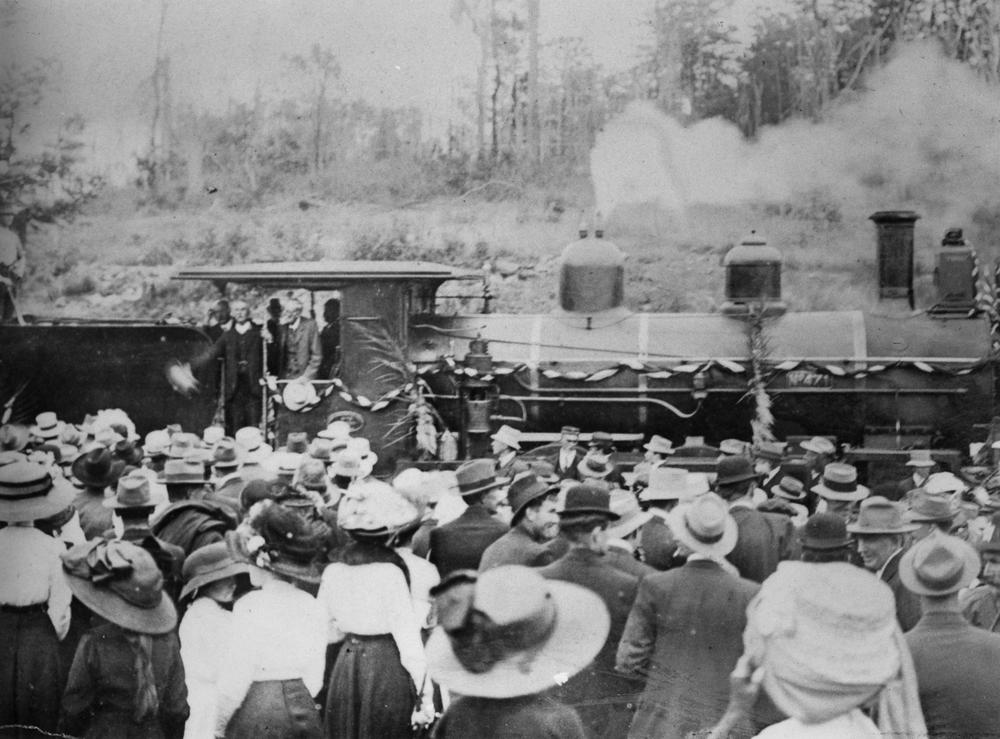
Opening of the railway to Yarraman, 1913

The Brisbane Valley railway line was a railway connection in Queensland, Australia connecting Ipswich, west of Brisbane, to the upper Brisbane River valley. Progressively opened between 1884 and 1913, the railway provided a vital transport link between Ipswich and Yarraman and forged development and prosperity along its path. The line acquired its serpentine reputation because it did not take a straight course when faced with a hill or gully.

The line branched from the main western line to Toowoomba and Charleville at Wulkuraka a short distance west of Ipswich and struck a north-westerly route towards Fernvale and Lowood before continuing on via Toogoolawah and Blackbutt to Yarraman. It became one of the few branch lines to accommodate passenger and mixed trains and the introduction in 1928 of rail motor services ensured that it retained an important passenger traffic role.

Passenger services beyond Toogoolawah ceased in 1967, with the Toogoolawah railmotor being withdrawn in 1989 and the entire line closed in 1993. A recreational rail trail, the Brisbane Valley Rail Trail, has been built on the route. The completed trail was opened in August 2018 and covers 161km (100 miles). The trail is open to walkers, cyclists and horseriders.

== Route ==
=== Stage 1 ===
The first section from Wulkuraka to Lowood was opened on 16 June 1884 and stops were established at Muirlea, Pine Mountain, Borallon, Wanora, Fairney View, Fernvale, Vernor and Lowood. Originally known as "Stinking Gully", Fernvale acquired that name in 1875. The spot became a regular camping place on the road from Ipswich to Esk.

Previously known as "The Scrub" or "Cairnhill", Lowood developed as a railhead town after it became the terminus for the first section of the line. A station building was constructed about this time. A telegraph office operated from the station building from 1885 to 1886 and a post office operated there from 1888 to about 1938. By 1926 the station boasted a refreshment room, goods shed, freight shed, pig shed and station master's quarters. The station building was recently restored and a railway history museum is proposed.

=== Stage 2 ===
Opened on 9 August 1886, the line's second stage passed through Clarendon, Coominya, and Mount Hallen and terminated at Esk. A station building was built at Coominya (originally called Bellevue) in 1886 as part of the extension. A goods shed was added and in about 1891 the platform and station building were relocated to the opposite side of the line. A station master was appointed in 1914 allowing opposing trains to pass. The station became a centre for livestock transport. The station building has been restored and is now used for community purposes.

The town of "Gallanani" (perhaps an aboriginal name for the eastern swamp hen) was established at present day Esk in 1872. When the railway arrived the town continued under the name of Gallanani and the station was called Esk. Gallanani became the railway town of Esk in 1913. Esk grew to become the principal township in the Brisbane Valley and refreshment rooms were added in 1912 and relocated as house in 1978. Pigs, cattle, timber and condensed milk made up the bulk of the freight. Fast and cheap transport of timber to Brisbane was also required to support housing for the burgeoning population in the state's capital. Esk handled a lot of traffic during the construction of Somerset Dam in the 1930s and 1940s. As a special event, the last steam train travelled through Esk in 1993.

=== Stages 3-4 ===
15 February 1904 and 1 September 1904 saw the third and fourth stages of the line opened to Toogoolawah (via Ottaba) and Yimbun respectively. The already successful Cressbrook condensed milk factory operated in Toogoolawah and the advent of the railway boosted its development. When the first passenger arrived, there was confusion between Cressbrook station and Cressbrook railway station. The name Toogoolawah was chosen for the railway station after a local family's home in Brisbane called "Tugulawa" meaning a "bend in the river". At its height, the railway complex included a goods shed, turntable, camping quarters, cattle yards, station master's residence and pig pens. Yimbun (previously called Moorabool and later Kannangur) is only some 4 miles beyond Toogoolawah and three trains a week plied the line from Ipswich.

=== Stages 5-7 ===
More than six years later, on 22 November 1910, the line's fifth stage was opened to Linville and stops were established at Harlin, Nurinda and Moore. Cattle, sheep and pig yards were built at Harlin when the railway opened and a crossing loop was constructed in 1941 allowing trains to pass. The station mistress was withdrawn from service in October 1963. Named after the Moore family, a goods shed and platform were established at Moore in 1910. A shelter shed, cattle yards and loading bank were added later. Cattle and timber were major commodities railed through Linville which once boasted the largest rail head in south east Queensland and the second largest in the southern hemisphere. Cattle came from all parts of the South Burnett region to be railed south to markets.

The line was opened to Benarkin on 8 May 1911 and via Blackbutt and Nukku to Gilla on 19 December 1912. From Benarkin and Blackbutt large quantities of timber were transported. Blackbutt was named in 1909 after a common tree of the area – the Blackbutt or Eucalyptus pilularis. A station master was appointed to Blackbutt in 1913 and service at the station ceased in 1965.

Gilla railway station was at 26.8777°S 152.0393°E.

=== Stage 8 ===
Opened on 1 May 1913, the eighth and final stage terminated at Yarraman after passing through Pidna. A proposed extension to Nanango did not eventuate. Yarraman station serviced the Queensland Pine Company until the sawmill closed in 1972. A passenger train left Ipswich three days a week at 8.30 am for the six-hour journey to Yarraman. The return journey next morning was twenty five minutes quicker. The first diesel locomotive operated between Ipswich and Yarraman in 1967. In the same year passenger services on the line ceased. During World War II the coastline was thought vulnerable to attack and an alternative defence road was built with the railway used to transport fuel. Large underground storage tanks were built near the railway station and were used up to the 1980s. Trucking yards were closed in 1991 and services were discontinued some two years later.

== Closure ==
The once-busy Brisbane Valley railway ceased operations in 1993. The line from Nurinda (near Colinton) to Yarraman was removed in 1995 leaving only the railway corridor in place.

== See also ==
- Rail transport in Queensland
