= Pine Mountain, Queensland =

Pine Mountain
- Suburb
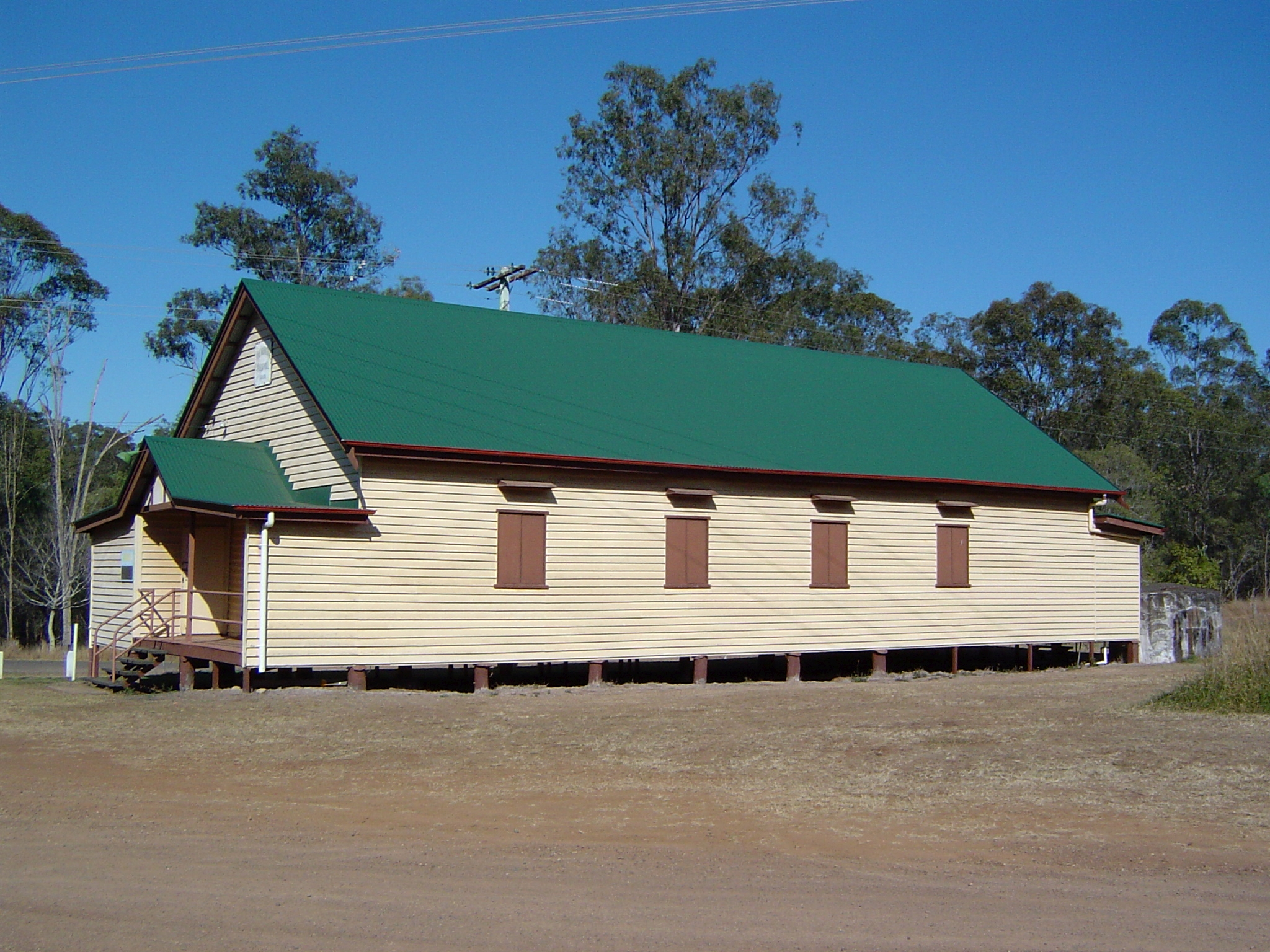
- Pine Mountain Community Hall, 2014

- Interactive map of Pine Mountain
- Coordinates: 27.535°S 152.72°E
- Country: Australia
- State: Queensland
- City: Ipswich
- LGA: City of Ipswich
- Location: 6.4 km (4.0 mi) NW of Brassal; 12.0 km (7.5 mi) NW of Ipswich CBD; 46.2 km (28.7 mi) SW of Brisbane CBD

Government
  - State electorate: Ipswich West
  - Federal division: Blair

Area
  - Total: 38.7 km^{2} (14.9 sq mi)

Population
  - Total: 1,695 (2021 census)
  - Density: 43.80/km^{2} (113.44/sq mi)
- Time zone: UTC+10:00 (AEST)
- Postcode: 4306
Suburbs around Pine Mountain
Borallon	Lake Manchester	Kholo
Wanora	Pine Mountain	Kholo
Ironbark	Blacksoil; Brassall	Muirlea

Pine Mountain is a semi-rural locality in the City of Ipswich, Queensland, Australia. In the 2021 census, Pine Mountain had a population of 1,695 people.

== Geography ==
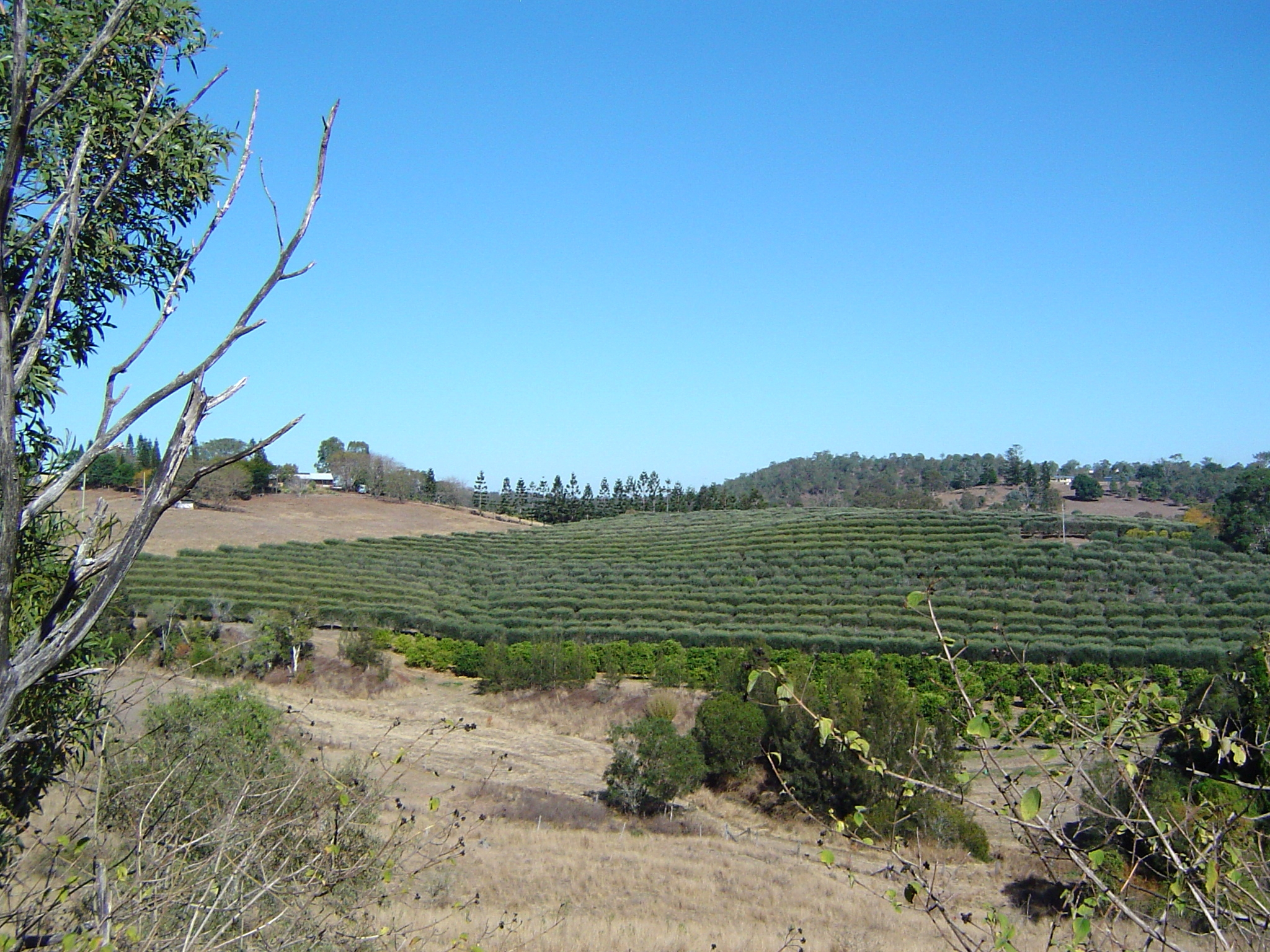
Olive orchard, 2014

The locality is bounded on the north and east by the Brisbane River and to the north-west by its tributary Sandy Creek. It is bounded to the south by the Warrego Highway and to the south-west and west by the Brisbane Valley Highway.

Worlds End Pocket is a pocket of the Brisbane River in the easternmost part of the locality.(27.5211°S 152.7583°E).

Pine Mountain has the following mountains:

- Flinton Hill in the north of the locality (27.51972°S 152.75333°E) 105 metres (344 ft)
- Pine Mountain in the east of the locality (27.5396°S 152.7272°E) 233 metres (764 ft)

This area consists mostly of rural properties and acreages with historical farmhouses and buildings.

Araucaria cunninghamii, also known as the hoop pine, is very common in the area.

== History ==
In 1824, the explorers John Oxley and Allan Cunningham mentioned meeting an elderly Aboriginal man who had been fishing with a spear near Upper Blackwall. Cunningham described his friendliness and his "open frankness of countenance" as he provided them with information regarding convenient places to cross the river and travelled with them to the foot of Pine Mountain.

Pine Mountain (the mountain) was originally named Pine Ridge by John Oxley on 21 September 1824, but later became known as Pine Mountain. The locality takes its name from the mountain.

By the 1850s, loggers had moved into the area due to abundant timber provided by the hoop pine. Some logs were transported to Ipswich using bullock teams, while others were transported down the Brisbane River.

After tracts of land were cleared farming commenced, with the early settlers producing lucerne, maize and cotton. Orchards were started and dairying became important. A small butter factory, a school and several churches were established. Of these only the Catholic Church remains.

The Congregational Church commenced services at Pine Mountain circa 1863. In May 1873 a Congregational Chapel was erected on a 3.5-acre (1.4 ha) site with a chapel that was relocated from Bremer Mills (at Bundamba). This chapel was used to house a provisional school under teacher Mr Bryce with an enrolment of 50 to 60 children and an average attendance of about 30 children.

Pine Mountain State School opened circa 1864 and closed in 1963. The school was at 820-838 Pine Mountain Road (27.5446°S 152.7117°E).

Riverside Pine Mountain Provisional School opened in late 1876 and closed in 1882.

On Sunday 24 February 1865 St John's Catholic Chapel was opened by Bishop James Quinn. It was built from pine on land donated by John Barnes with contributions from many in the community, both Catholic and Protestants. It was described as the second church erected in the district. The chapel was destroyed by fire on Monday 14 September 1874. In 1879 St Andrew's Catholic Church was erected. In 1934 a new St Michael's Catholic Church was erected.

The Brisbane Valley railway line was established in 1884, connecting Ipswich to Lowood and passing through Pine Mountain. This line still exists but is disused.

A United Methodist Free Church opened at Pine Mountain on Sunday 13 September 1874 with a service conducted by the Reverend David Porteus of Ipswich. The church building was described as being built of pine at the very top of the mountain on the southern side, a site donated by Reuben Worley.

St Peter's Anglican Church opened circa 1886. It closed circa 1962.

== Demographics ==
In the 2016 census, Pine Mountain had a population of 1,667 people.

In the 2021 census, Pine Mountain had a population of 1,695 people.

== Education ==
There are no schools in Pine Mountain. The nearest government primary schools are Brassall State School in neighbouring Brassall to the south, Haigslea State School in Haigslea to the south-west, and Glamorgan Vale State School in Glamorgan Vale to the west. The nearest government secondary school is Ipswich State High School, also in Brassall.

== Amenities ==
St Michael's Catholic Church is at 856 Pine Mountain Road (27.5429°S 152.7104°E).
