= Wanora, Queensland =

Wanora
- Suburb
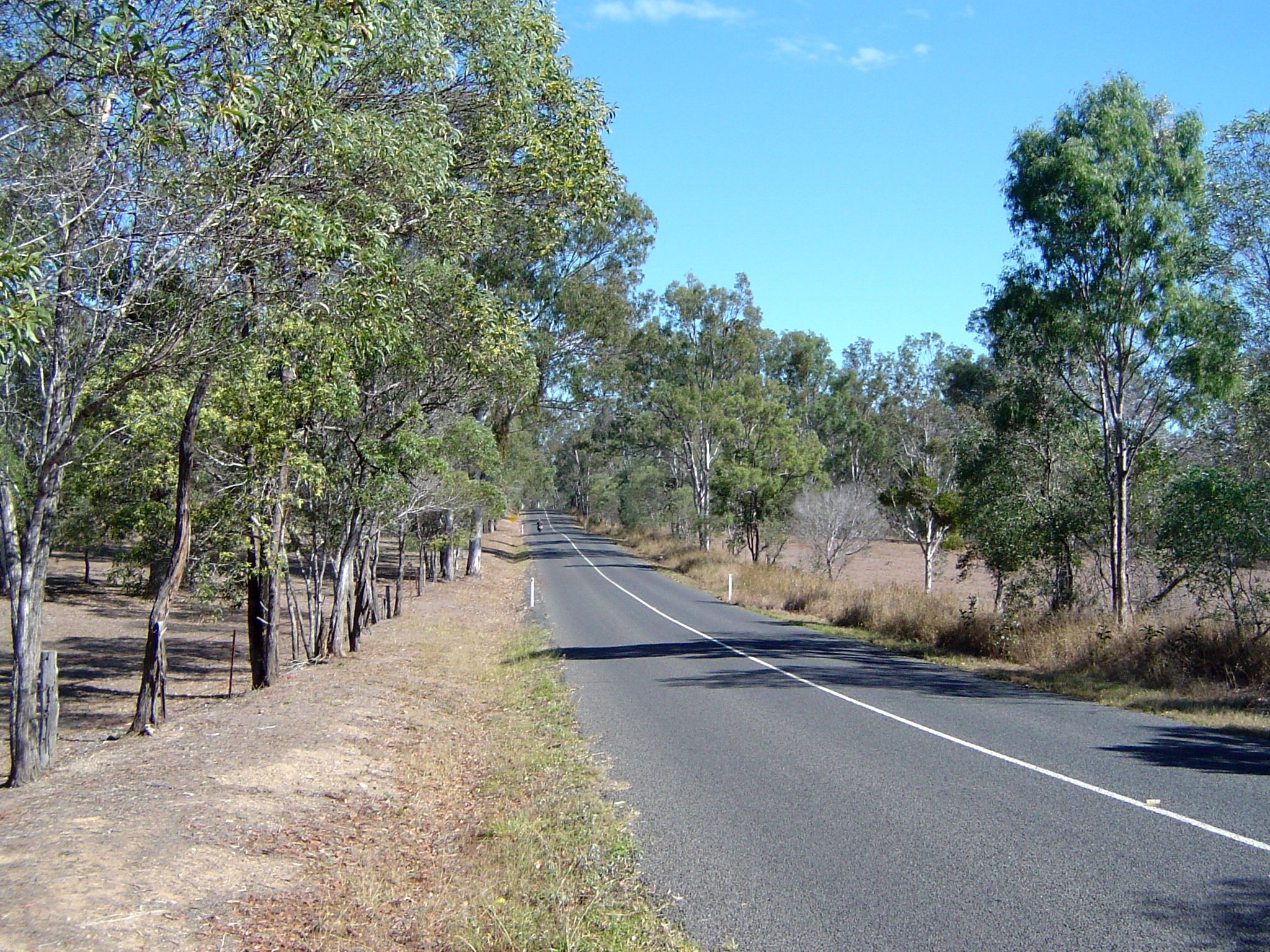
- Pine Mountain Road, 2014

- Interactive map of Wanora
- Coordinates: 27.5233°S 152.6677°E
- Country: Australia
- State: Queensland
- City: Somerset Region
- LGA: Somerset Region
- Location: 8.7 km (5.4 mi) S of Fernvale; 13.7 km (8.5 mi) SE of Lowood; 15.8 km (9.8 mi) NW of Ipswich; 52.8 km (32.8 mi) W of Brisbane CBD

Government
  - State electorate: Lockyer
  - Federal division: Blair

Area
  - Total: 13.7 km^{2} (5.3 sq mi)

Population
  - Total: 262 (2021 census)
  - Density: 19.12/km^{2} (49.53/sq mi)
- Time zone: UTC+10:00 (AEST)
- Postcode: 4306
Suburbs around Wanora
Fairney View	Fairney View	Borallon
Glamorgan Vale	Wanora	Borallon
Glamorgan Vale	Ironbark	Pine Mountain

Wanora is a rural locality in the Somerset Region, Queensland, Australia. In the 2021 census, Wanora had a population of 262 people.

== History ==
The Brisbane Valley railway line opened its first stage from Wulkuraka to Lowood on 16 June 1884 with the locality served by the Wanora railway station (27.5120°S 152.6670°E). The line closed in 1993 and the railway corridor was redeveloped as the Brisbane Valley Rail Trail.

== Demographics ==
In the 2016 census, Wanora had a population of 265 people.

In the 2021 census, Wanora had a population of 262 people.

== Education ==
There are no schools in Wanora. The nearest government primary schools are Glamorgan Vale State School in neighbouring Glamorgan Vale to the west and Fernvale State School in Fernvale to the north. The nearest government secondary schools are Lowood State High School in Lowood to the north-west and Ipswich State High School in Brassall, Ipswich, to the south-east.
