= Borallon, Queensland =

Borallon
- Suburb
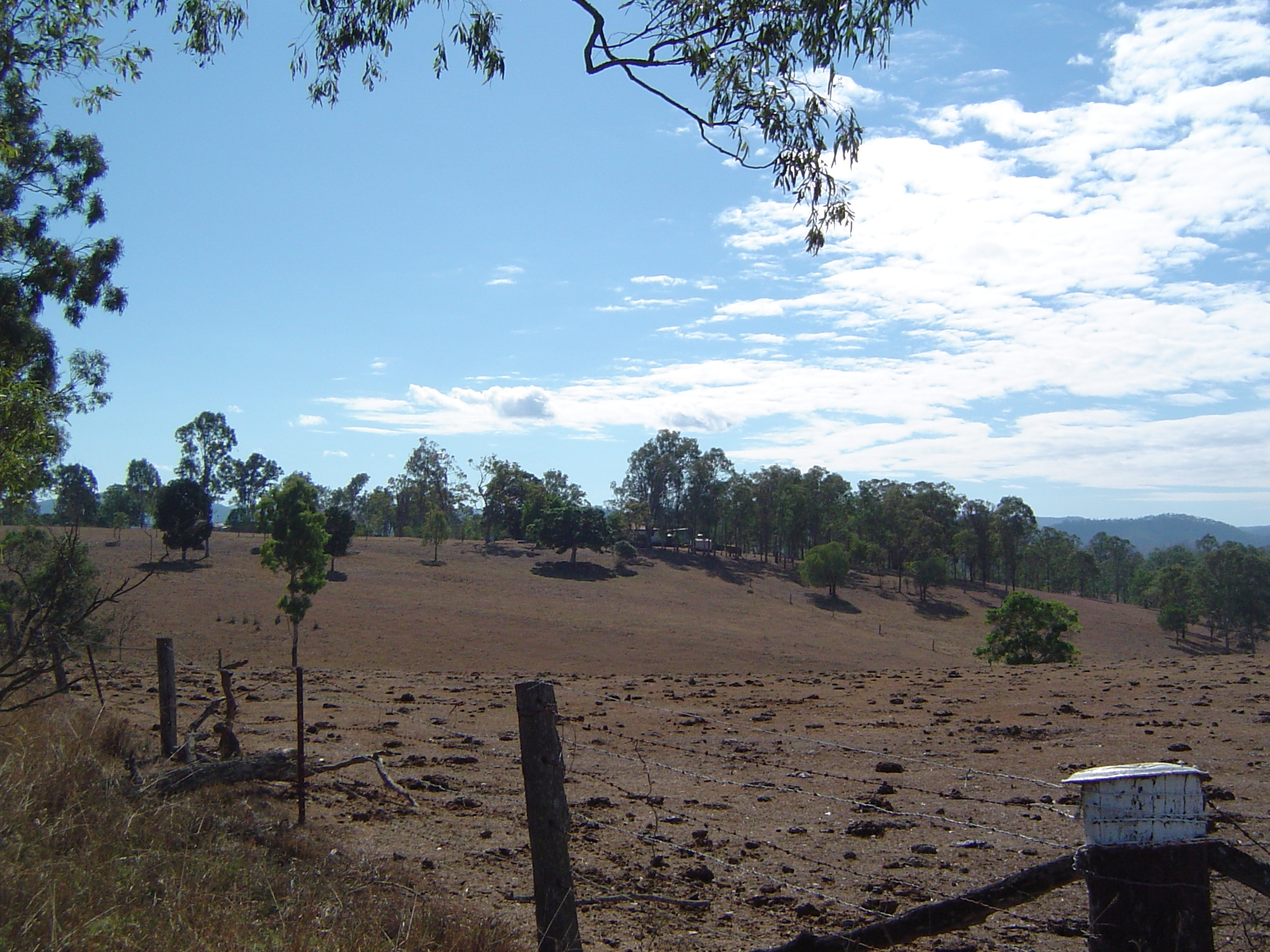
- Paddocks along Hills Road, 2014

- Interactive map of Borallon
- Coordinates: 27.5025°S 152.7011°E
- Country: Australia
- State: Queensland
- LGA: Somerset Region
- Location: 9.7 km (6.0 mi) SE of Fernvale; 20.3 km (12.6 mi) NNW of Ipswich; 49.2 km (30.6 mi) SE of Esk; 57.8 km (35.9 mi) W of Brisbane CBD

Government
  - State electorate: Lockyer
  - Federal division: Dickson

Area
  - Total: 13.8 km^{2} (5.3 sq mi)

Population
  - Total: 90 (2021 census)
  - Density: 6.5/km^{2} (16.9/sq mi)
- Time zone: UTC+10:00 (AEST)
- Postcode: 4306
Suburbs around Borallon
Fernvale	Fernvale	Lake Manchester
Fairney View	Borallon	Pine Mountain
Wanora	Pine Mountain	Pine Mountain

Borallon is a rural locality in the Somerset Region, Queensland, Australia. In the 2021 census, Borallon had a population of 90 people.

== Geography ==
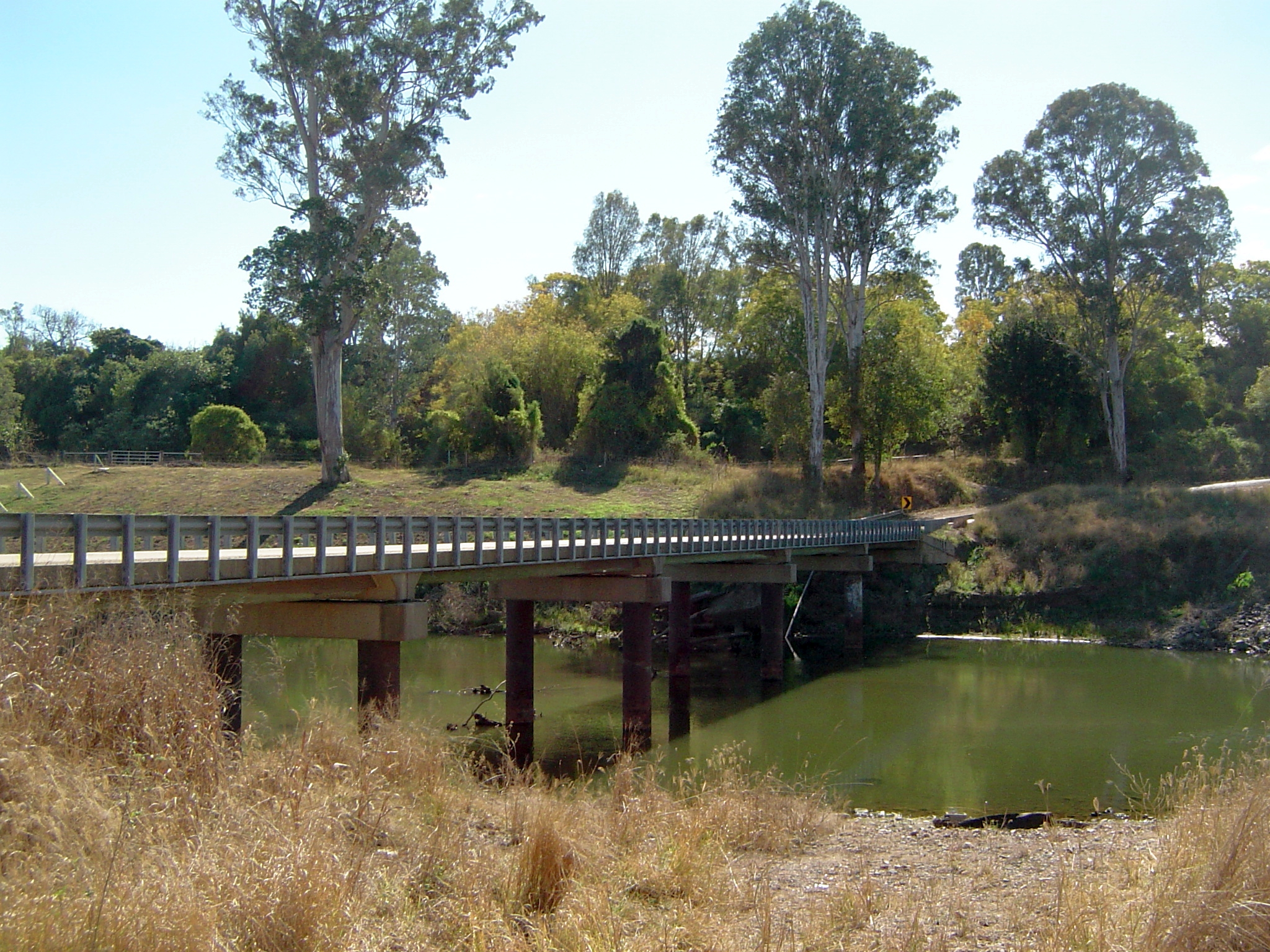
Burtons Bridge, 2014

The locality is bounded to the north-west and west by the Brisbane River, which then flows through the locality, and then bounds the locality to the south-east and east, putting the locality on both sides of the Brisbane River. Burtons Bridge on E Summervilles Road is one of the crossing points for the river (27.49960°S 152.68969°E).

== History ==
The locality takes its name from a railway station, which was in turned named by Queensland Railway Commissioner Francis Curnow after his birthplace near St Ives in Cornwall, England.

Borallon Post Office opened on 1 July 1927 (a receiving office had been open from 1922) and closed in 1974.

== Demographics ==
In the 2016 census, Borallon had a population of 81 people.

In the 2021 census, Borallon had a population of 90 people.

== Education ==
There are no schools in Borallon. The nearest government primary school is Glamorgan Vale State School in Glamorgan Vale to the south-west. The nearest government secondary school is Ipswich State High School in Brassall, Ipswich, to the south-east.

== Facilities ==
Despite the name, the Borallon Correctional Centre is not in Borallon but in Ironbark, approximately 10 kilometres (6.2 mi) away.
