= Fairney View, Queensland =

Fairney View
- Suburb
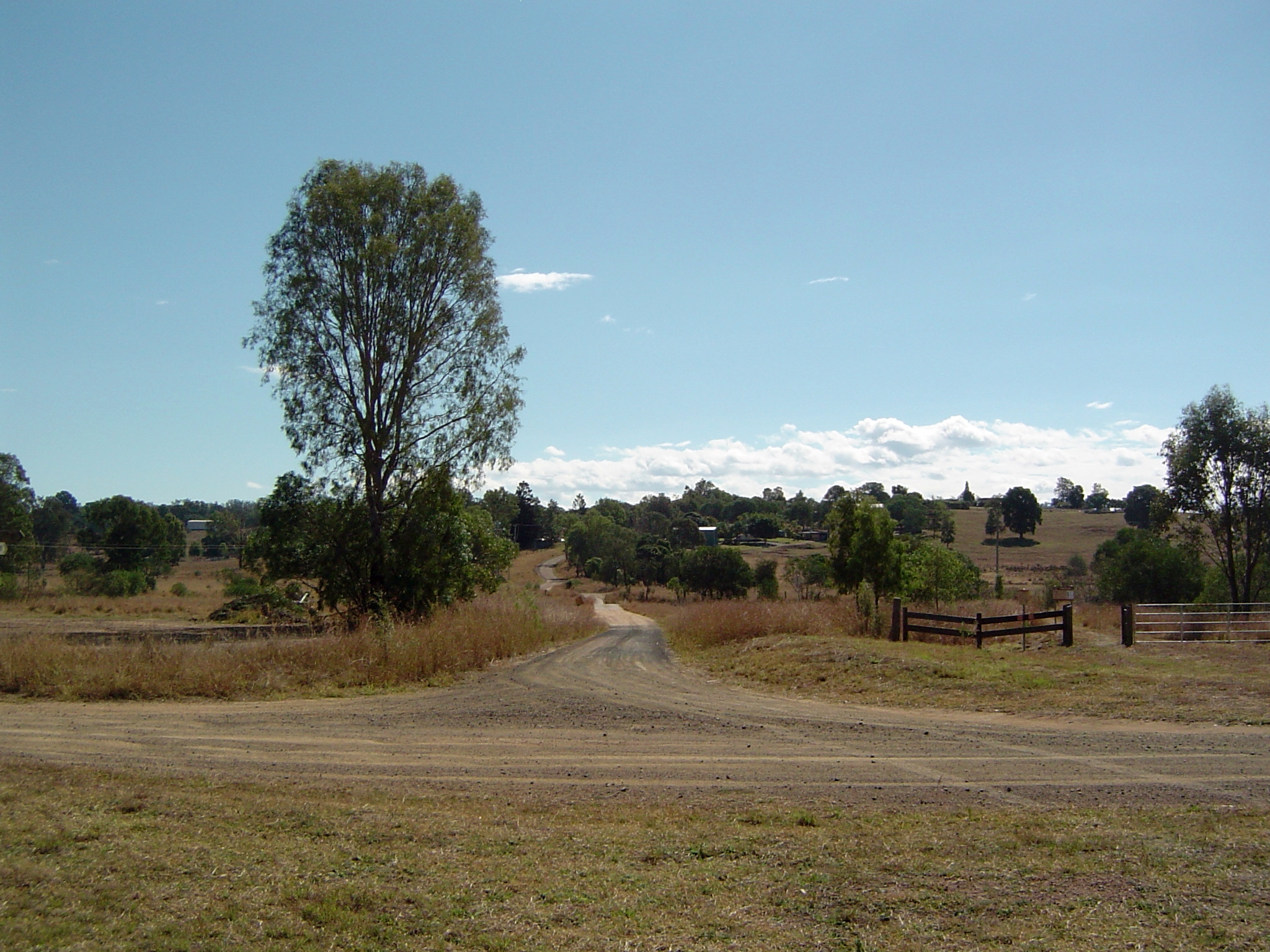
- Fairney View Fernvale Road, 2014

- Interactive map of Fairney View
- Coordinates: 27.4819°S 152.6511°E
- Country: Australia
- State: Queensland
- LGA: Somerset Region
- Location: 3.7 km (2.3 mi) SE of Fernvale; 24.4 km (15.2 mi) NW of Ipswich; 42.5 km (26.4 mi) SE of Esk; 60.9 km (37.8 mi) W of Brisbane CBD

Government
  - State electorate: Lockyer
  - Federal division: Dickson

Area
  - Total: 11.2 km^{2} (4.3 sq mi)

Population
  - Total: 221 (2021 census)
  - Density: 19.73/km^{2} (51.1/sq mi)
- Time zone: UTC+10:00 (AEST)
- Postcode: 4306
Suburbs around Fairney View
Fernvale	Fernvale	Fernvale
Vernor	Fairney View	Borallon
Glamorgan Vale	Wanora	Wanora

Fairney View is a rural locality in the Somerset Region, Queensland, Australia. In the 2021 census, Fairney View had a population of 221 people.

== History ==
The locality takes its name from a pastoral property called Fairney Lawn (also written as Fairnie Lawn) operated by grazier Joseph North in 1841. It was also the name of the railway station opened in June 1884 on the now closed Brisbane Valley railway line. Queensland Railways Department records indicate that the meaning of the name Fairney View is ''view of ferns".

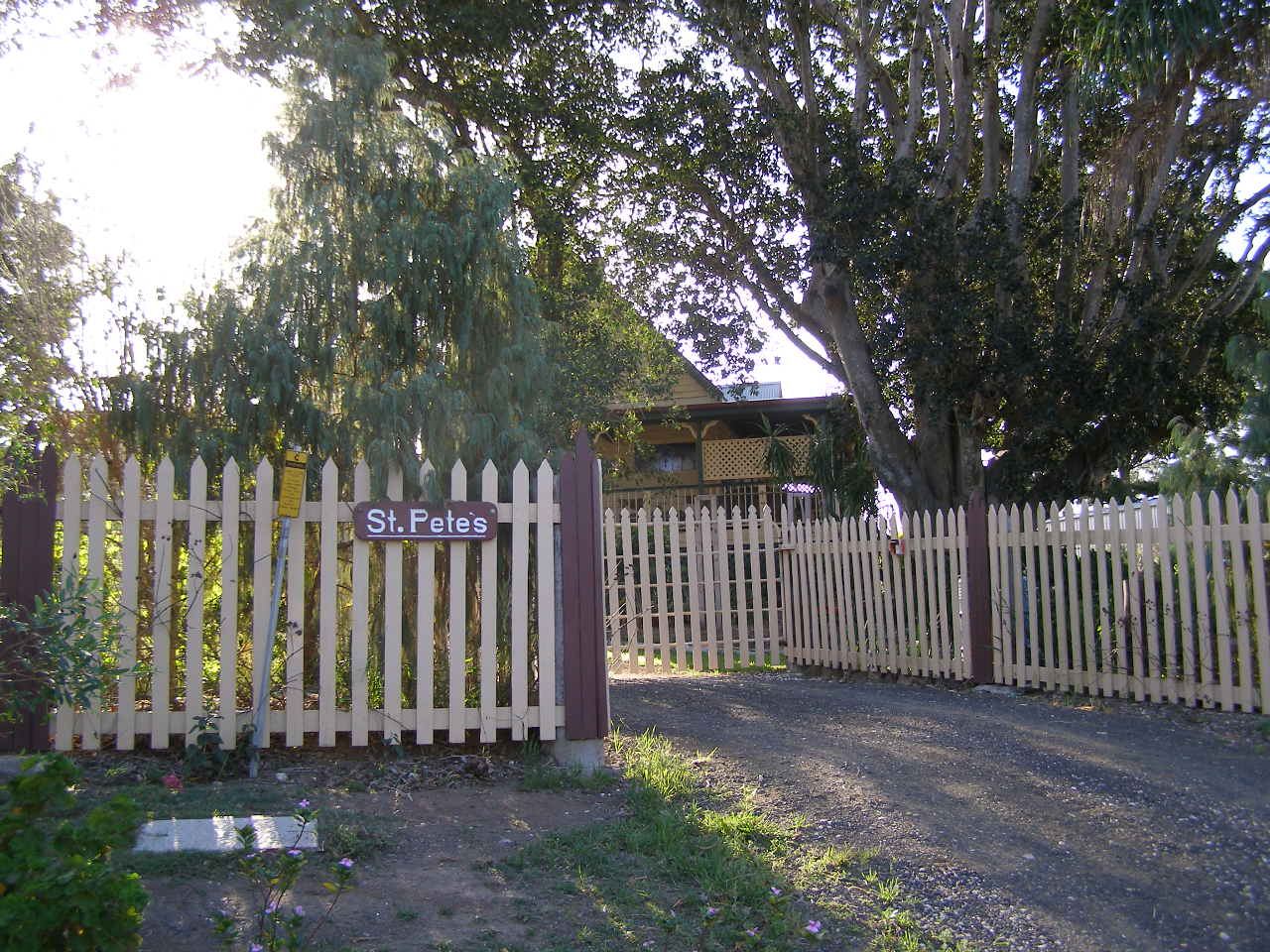
Former St Peter's Lutheran Church, 2006

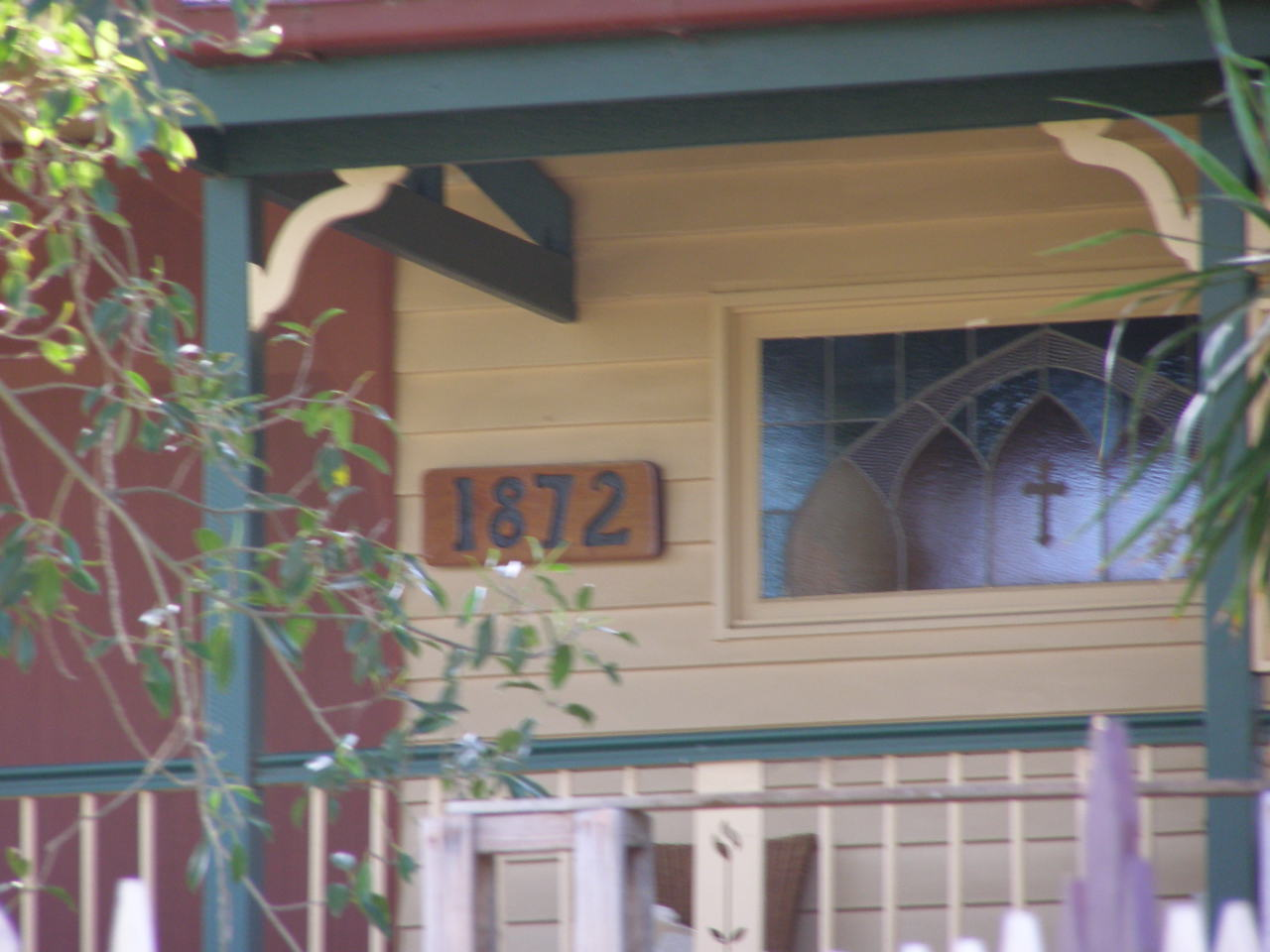
1872: the original opening date of St Peter's

In June 1872, a German Lutheran Church was opened near the bridge over Fairney Brook on the road to Wivenhoe (the present Fairney View Fernvale Road, approx 27.48237°S 152.66143°E). It was low-lying land and the church was badly flooded on two occasions, once in 1893 when the water was over 6 feet (1.8 m) above the building and on a second time when the water reached the roof. On Saturday 5 September 1903, St Peter's Lutheran Church was relocated and re-opened at a less flood-prone and more central location (332 Fernvale Road, 27.48260°S 152.64352°E). However, due to the age of the building, a lot of the material in the old building had to be replaced. The church is now closed and has been converted to a private home.

Tenders were called for the construction of a school building in Fairney View in October 1895. Fairney View Provisional School opened on 20 January 1896 under the direction of teacher Miss Harris. It became Fairney View State School on 1 January 1909. It closed in 1967. It was at 20-30 Randalls Road (27.4937°S 152.6678°E).

== Demographics ==
In the 2016 census, Fairney View had a population of 223 people.

In the 2021 census, Fairney View had a population of 221 people.

== Education ==
There are no schools in Fairney View. The nearest government primary schools are Fernvale State School in neighbouring Fernvale to the north and Glamorgan Vale State School in neighbouring Glamorgan Vale to the south-west. The nearest government secondary school is Lowood State High School in Lowood to the west.
