= Lark Hill, Queensland =

Lark Hill
- Suburb
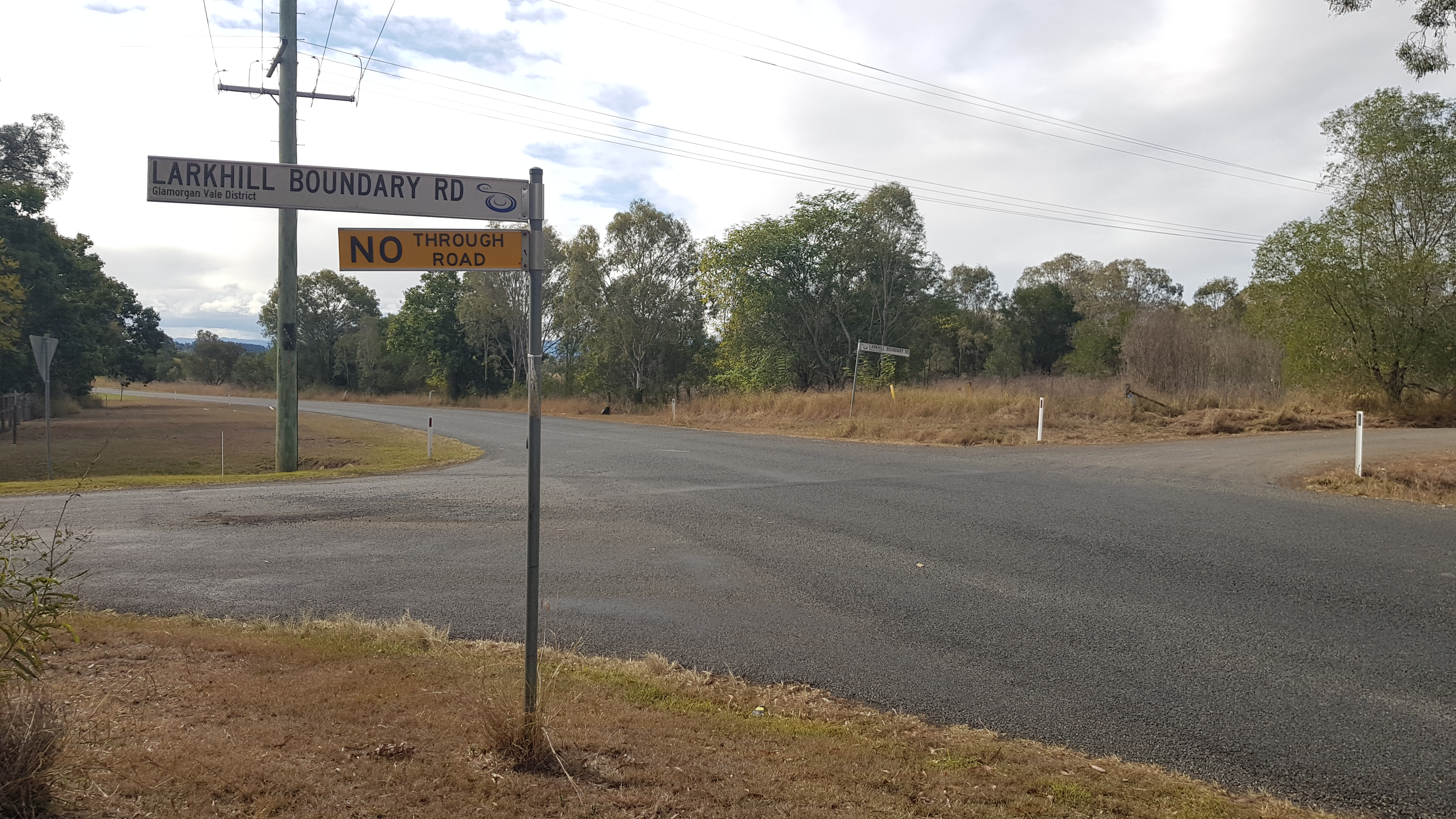
- Larkhill Boundary Road, 2023

- Interactive map of Lark Hill
- Coordinates: 27.5233°S 152.5969°E
- Country: Australia
- State: Queensland
- LGA: Somerset Region
- Location: 11.8 km (7.3 mi) S of Lowood; 24.1 km (15.0 mi) NW of Ipswich; 49.5 km (30.8 mi) SSE of Esk; 61.6 km (38.3 mi) W of Brisbane CBD

Government
  - State electorate: Lockyer
  - Federal division: Blair

Area
  - Total: 4.0 km^{2} (1.5 sq mi)

Population
  - Total: 69 (2021 census)
  - Density: 17.3/km^{2} (44.7/sq mi)
- Time zone: UTC+10:00 (AEST)
- Postcode: 4306
Suburbs around Lark Hill
Coolana	Glamorgan Vale	Glamorgan Vale
Coolana	Lark Hill	Glamorgan Vale
Minden	Marburg	Marburg

Lark Hill is a rural locality in the Somerset Region, Queensland, Australia. In the 2021 census, Lark Hill had a population of 69 people.

== History ==
Mount Stradbrook Provisional School opened on 8 July 1907. In June 1908, it was renamed Lark Hill Provisional School. On 1 January 1909, it became Lark Hill State School. It closed on 28 July 1967. It was at 335 Larkhill Boundary Road (27.52671°S 152.60411°E).

== Demographics ==
In the 2016 census, Lark Hill had a population of 62 people.

In the 2021 census, Lark Hill had a population of 69 people.

== Education ==
There are no schools in Lark Hill. The nearest government primary schools are Glamorgan Vale State School in neighbouring Glamorgan Vale to the north-east and Tarampa State School in Tarampa to the north-west. The nearest government secondary school is Lowood State High School in Lowood to the north-west.
