= Muirlea, Queensland =

Muirlea
- Suburb
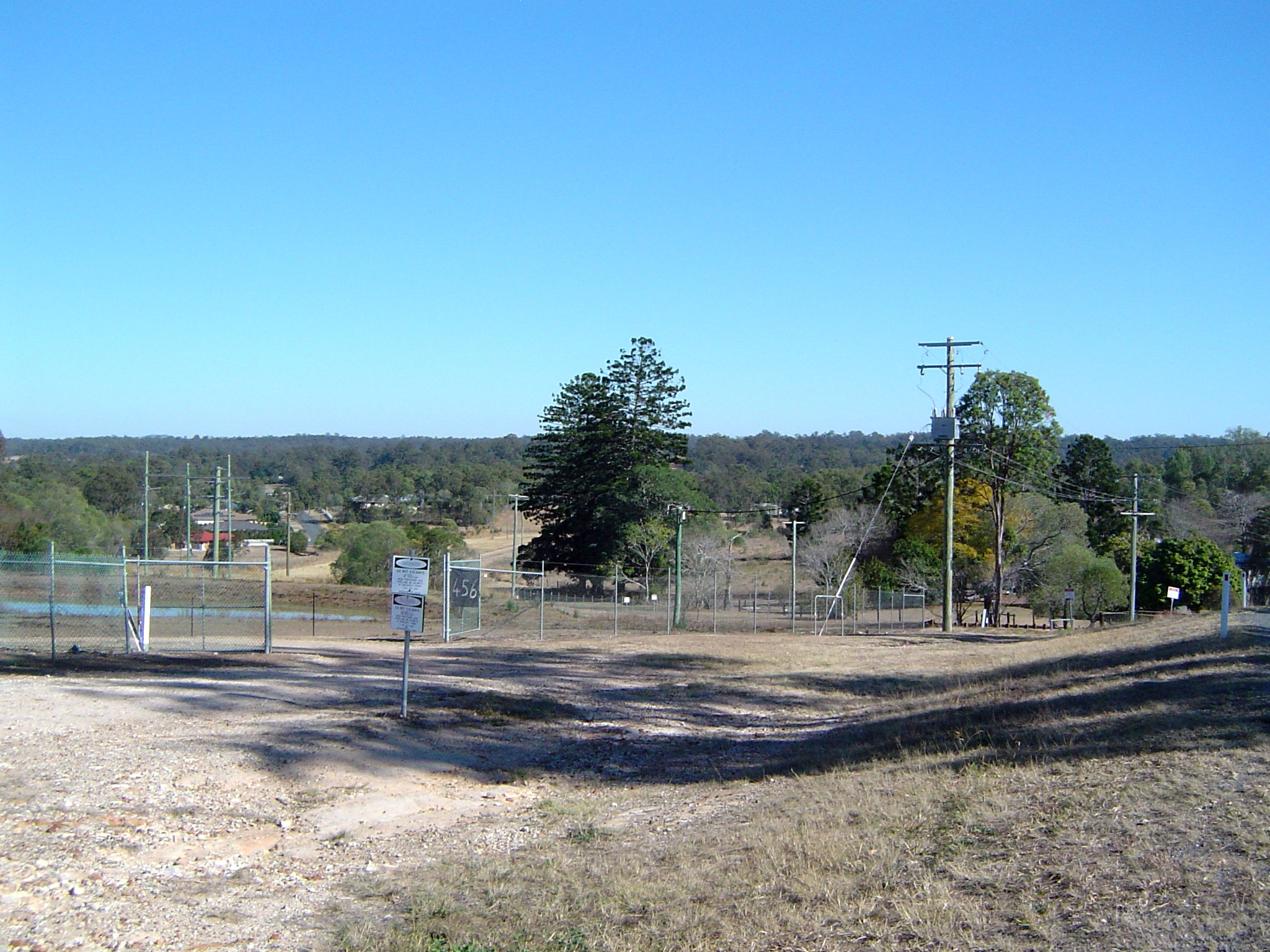
- Pine Mountain Road, 2014

- Interactive map of Muirlea
- Coordinates: 27.5686°S 152.7330°E
- Country: Australia
- State: Queensland
- City: Ipswich
- LGA: City of Ipswich
- Location: 9.3 km (5.8 mi) NW of Ipswich CBD; 46.5 km (28.9 mi) WSW of Brisbane CBD

Government
  - State electorate: Ipswich West
  - Federal division: Blair

Area
  - Total: 6.8 km^{2} (2.6 sq mi)

Population
  - Total: 174 (2021 census)
  - Density: 25.59/km^{2} (66.3/sq mi)
- Time zone: UTC+10:00 (AEST)
- Postcode: 4306
Suburbs around Muirlea
Pine Mountain	Pine Mountain	Kholo
Pine Mountain	Muirlea	Chuwar
Brassall	Brassall	North Ipswich

Muirlea is a rural locality in the City of Ipswich, Queensland, Australia. In the 2021 census, Muirlea had a population of 174 people.

== Geography ==
The locality is bounded to the west by the Brisbane Valley Rail Trail (the former Brisbane Valley railway line), to the north-east by the Brisbane River, and to the south by the Warrego Highway.

The land use is a mixture of rural residential housing, nature reserves, and grazing on native vegetation.

== History ==
The district was originally part of Brassall. It takes its present name from its former railway station, which in turn was named in June 1884, coined from the surname of local landowners John Muir and Andrew Muir with lea meaning pasture.

The first section of the Brisbane Valley railway line opened was from Wulkuraka to Lowood on 16 June 1884, including Muirlea railway station (27.5735°S 152.7188°E).

In January 1902, the railway station was severely damaged in a storm, losing its roof.

In June 1902, a 2-year-old child wandered onto the railway tracks. The driver of the approaching train managed to stop the train 2 to 3 feet (0.61 to 0.91 m) from the child.

In June 1918, two trains collided at the railway station. As the collision occurred at low speed, nobody was injured.

In September 1920, a fire at the railway station destroyed the office and its contents.

In December 1949, a fire destroyed the railway station master's house, which was unoccupied at the time.

The railway closed in 1993. All that remains of the Muirlea railway station is its sign.

In 2013, fire ants were found in the suburb.

== Demographics ==
In the 2016 census, Muirlea had a population of 190 people.

In the 2021 census, Muirlea had a population of 174 people.

== Education ==
There are no schools in Muirlea. The nearest government primary school is Brassall State School in neighbouring Brassall to the south. The nearest government secondary school is Ipswich State High School, also in Brassall to the south.

== Amenities ==
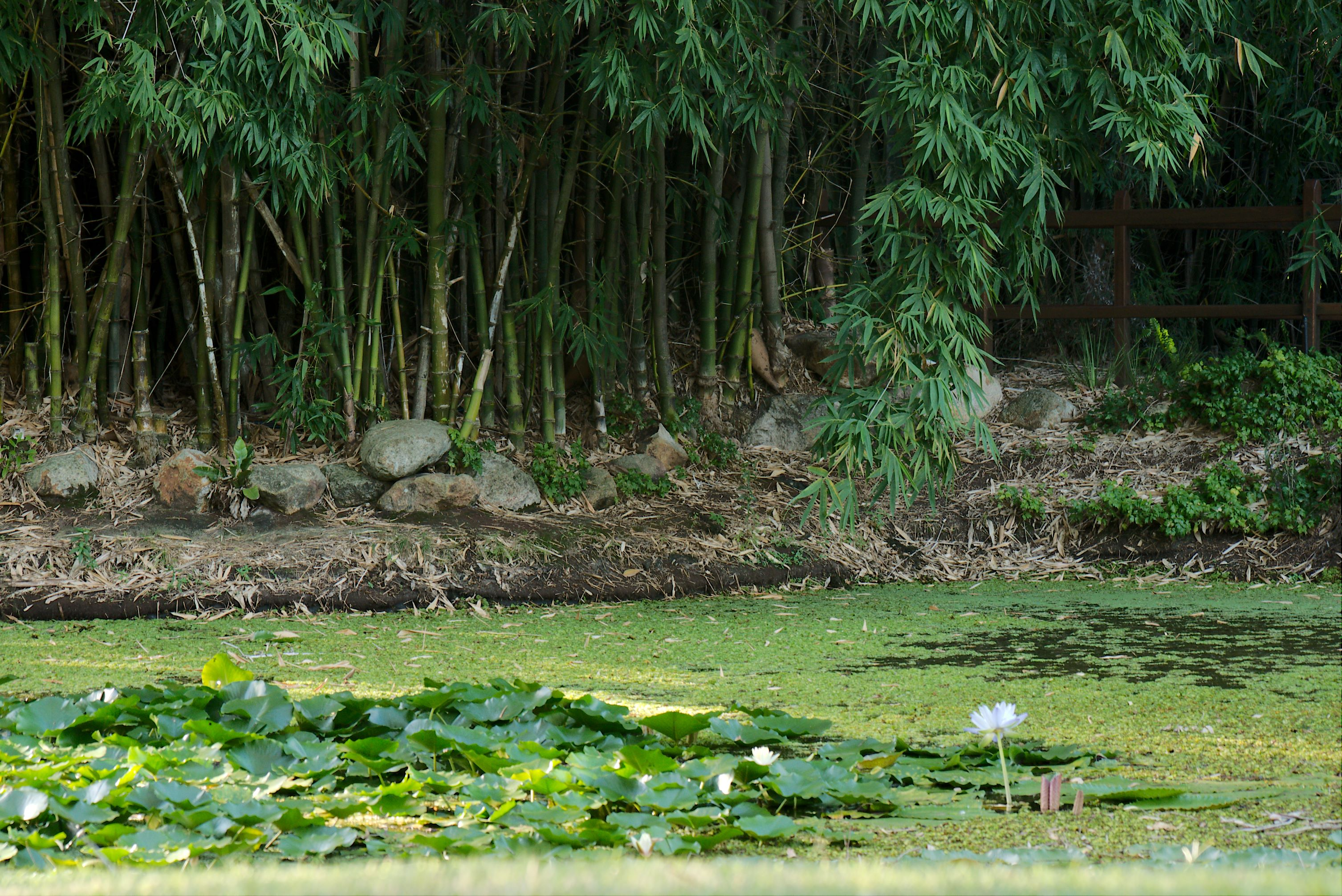
Pond at Kholo Gardens near sunset, 2015

There are a number of parks in the area (from north to south):

- Kholo Bridge Reserve provides access to the Brisbane River for swimming and canoeing at the northern end of Kholo Road (27.5676°S 152.7487°E)
- Kholo Gardens is a botanical garden at 243 Riverside Drive (27.5672°S 152.7411°E)
- Hillview Drive Reserve is suitable for bushwalking (27.5714°S 152.7387°E)
