= Wivenhoe Pocket =

- Suburb
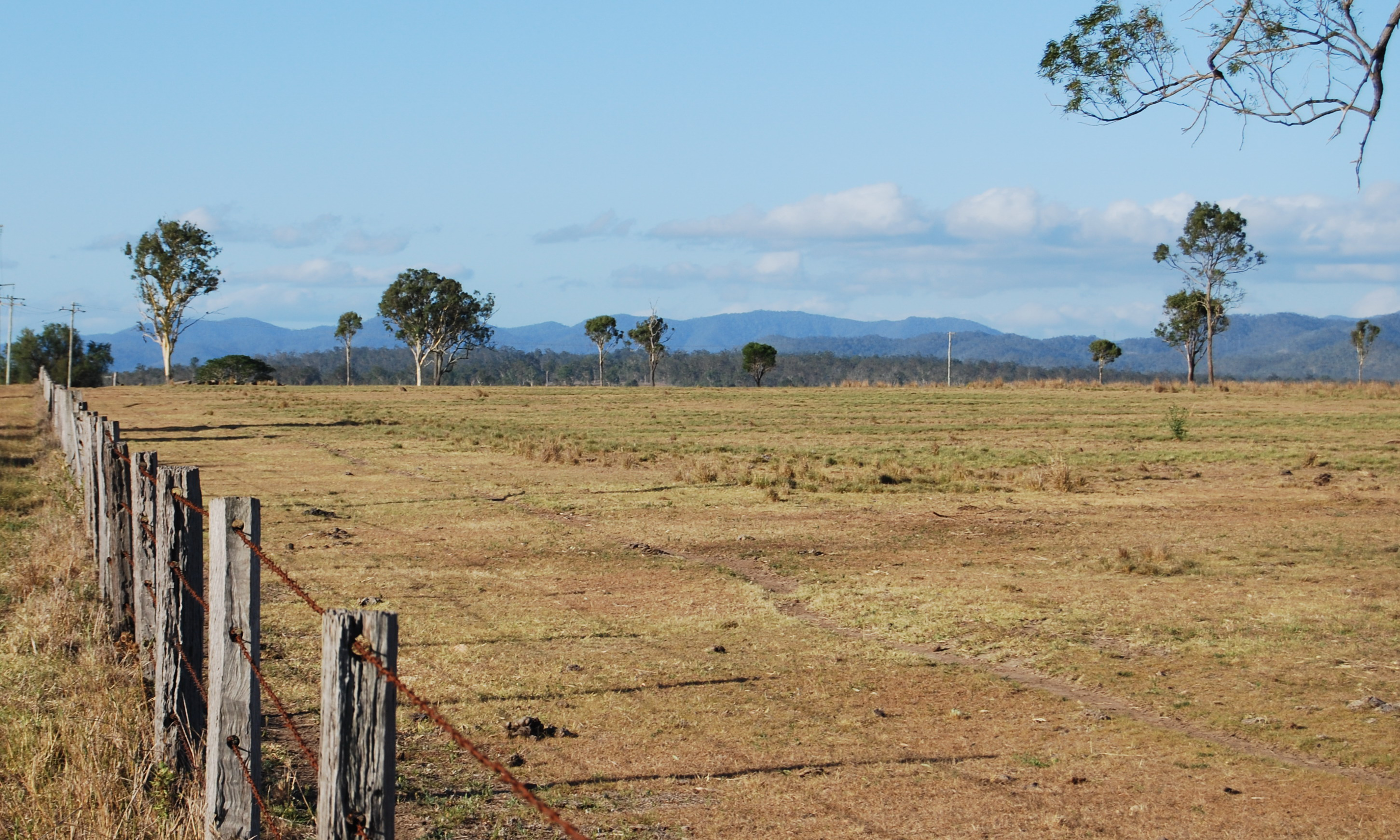

- Interactive map of Wivenhoe Pocket
- Coordinates: 27.4319°S 152.6177°E
- Country: Australia
- State: Queensland
- City: Somerset Region
- LGA: Somerset Region
- Location: 13.2 km (8.2 mi) NE of Lowood; 35.6 km (22.1 mi) SE of Esk; 31.5 km (19.6 mi) NNW of Ipswich; 68.1 km (42.3 mi) W of Brisbane

Government
  - State electorate: Nanango
  - Federal division: Dickson

Area
  - Total: 20.7 km^{2} (8.0 sq mi)

Population
  - Total: 417 (2021 census)
  - Density: 20.14/km^{2} (52.18/sq mi)
- Time zone: UTC+10:00 (AEST)
- Postcode: 4306
Suburbs around Wivenhoe Pocket
| Lake Wivenhoe | Lake Wivenhoe | Split Yard Creek |
| Patrick Estate | Wivenhoe Pocket | England Creek |
| Lowood | Vernor | Fernvale |

Wivenhoe Pocket is a rural locality in the Somerset Region, Queensland, Australia. In the 2021 census, Wivenhoe Pocket had a population of 417 people.

== History ==
Wivenhoe Pocket was named after an early pastoral run managed by Edmund Blucher Uhr, who named it after the town of Wivenhoe in Essex, England.

In 1877, 5,500 acres (2,200 ha) were resumed from the Wivenhoe pastoral run and offered for selection on 19 April 1877.

== Demographics ==
In the 2011 census, Wivenhoe Pocket had a population of 498 people.

In the 2016 census, Wivenhoe Pocket had a population of 440 people.

In the 2021 census, Wivenhoe Pocket had a population of 417 people.

== Education ==
There are no schools in Wivenhoe Pocket. The nearest government primary school is Fernvale State School in neighbouring Fernvale to the south-east. The nearest government secondary school is Lowood State High School in neighbouring Lowood to the south-west.
