= Glamorgan Vale, Queensland =

Glamorgan Vale
- Town
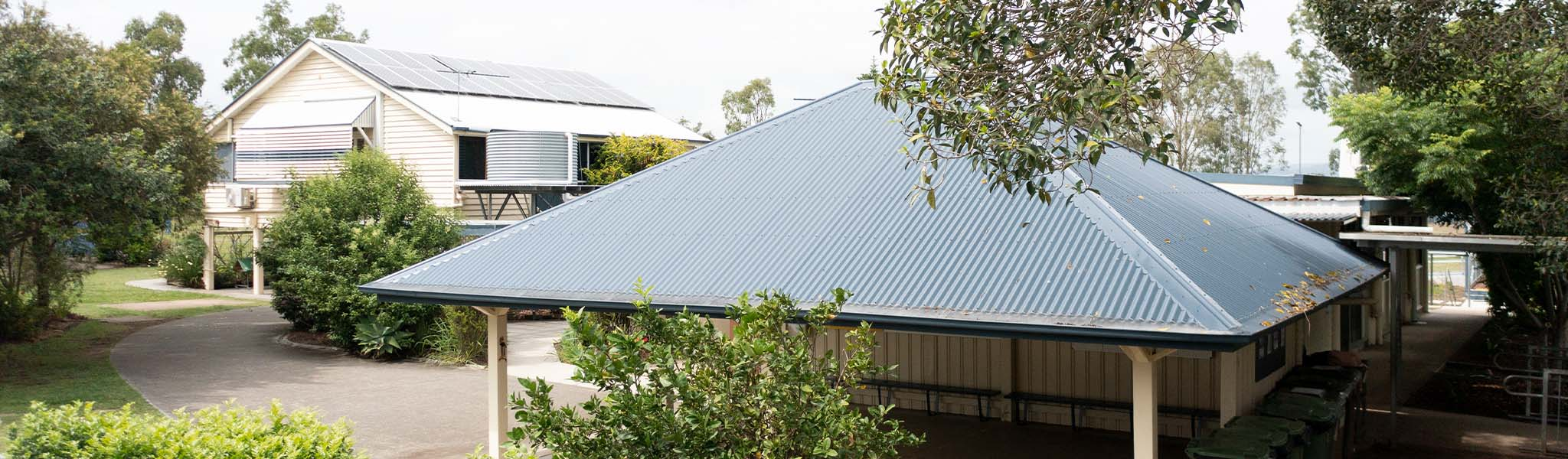
- Glamorganvale State School, 2022

- Interactive map of Glamorgan Vale
- Coordinates: 27.5145°S 152.6324°E
- Country: Australia
- State: Queensland
- LGA: Somerset Region
- Location: 9.2 km (5.7 mi) SSW of Fernvale; 22 km (14 mi) NW of Ipswich; 48 km (30 mi) SE of Esk; 59.4 km (36.9 mi) W of Brisbane

Government
  - State electorate: Lockyer
  - Federal division: Division of Blair

Area
  - Total: 29.2 km^{2} (11.3 sq mi)

Population
  - Total: 384 (2021 census)
  - Density: 13.15/km^{2} (34.06/sq mi)
- Time zone: UTC+10:00 (AEST)
- Postcode: 4306
Localities around Glamorgan Vale
Lowood	Vernor	Fairney View
Tarampa; Coolana	Glamorgan Vale	Wanora
Lark Hill	Marburg; Haigslea	Ironbark

Glamorgan Vale is a rural town and locality in the Somerset Region, Queensland, Australia. In the 2021 census, the locality of Glamorgan Vale had a population of 384 people.

== Geography ==
Glamorgan Vale is in the Lockyer Valley, 57 kilometres (35 mi) west of the state capital, Brisbane.

The township itself is prone to flooding in times of extreme weather events as it borders the Black Snake Creek a tributary of the Brisbane River.

== History ==
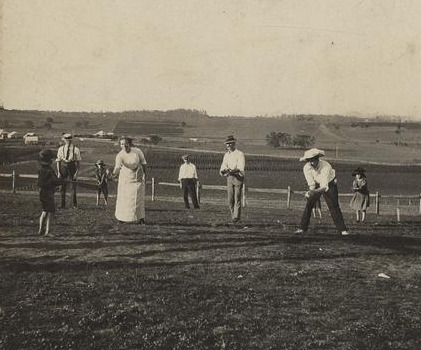
Game of rounders, 1913

A Wesleyan Methodist church opened on Tarampa Road on Sunday 20 August 1871. It was described as a "well built slab building, on a good site, and will seat about a hundred persons". It was erected by local people.

Glamorgan Vale Post Office opened on 1 January 1872 and closed in 1972. Thomas Pratt from Somerset, England was the first postmaster.

Pratt also had the licence for the Glamorgan hotel from 1880 to 1895 and again from 1898 to 1899. He and his family settled in Ipswich, naming their home Glamorganvale. The Hotel was redeveloped and now operates as the Bottletree Hotel.

Glamorgan Vale State School opened on 12 July 1875. A new school building was built in 1933. Glamorgan Vale State School celebrated its 140th anniversary in 2015 with approximately 2500 people attending the event. The school originally had a principal's house next door which was demolished and turned into a sports field.

The area was designated for new housing growth in the 2016 draft release of the South East Queensland Regional Plan.

== Demographics ==
In the 2011 census, the locality of Glamorgan Vale had a population of 560 people.

In the 2016 census, the locality of Glamorgan Vale had a population of 404 people.

In the 2021 census, the locality of Glamorgan Vale had a population of 384 people.

== Amenities ==
There is a heritage church across from the school which is now private property.

Down from the school, there is community hall, tennis court and public park.

Glamorgan Vale is also the home to a cemetery, private airfield, pet motel and the Glamorgan Vale Water Board.

The Glamorgan branch of the Queensland Country Women's Association meets at 725 Glamorgan Vale Road.

== Education ==
Glamorgan Vale State School is a government primary (Prep–6) school for boys and girls at 750 Glamorgan Vale Road (27.5149°S 152.6323°E). In 2017, the school had an enrolment of 68 students with 7 teachers (3 full-time equivalent) and 6 non-teaching staff (3 full-time equivalent). In 2018, the school had an enrolment of 61 students with 8 teachers (5 full-time equivalent) and 7 non-teaching staff (4 full-time equivalent).

There are no secondary schools in Glamorgan Vale. The nearest government secondary school is Lowood State High School in neighbouring Lowood to the north-west.
