= Ironbark, Queensland =

Ironbark
- Suburb
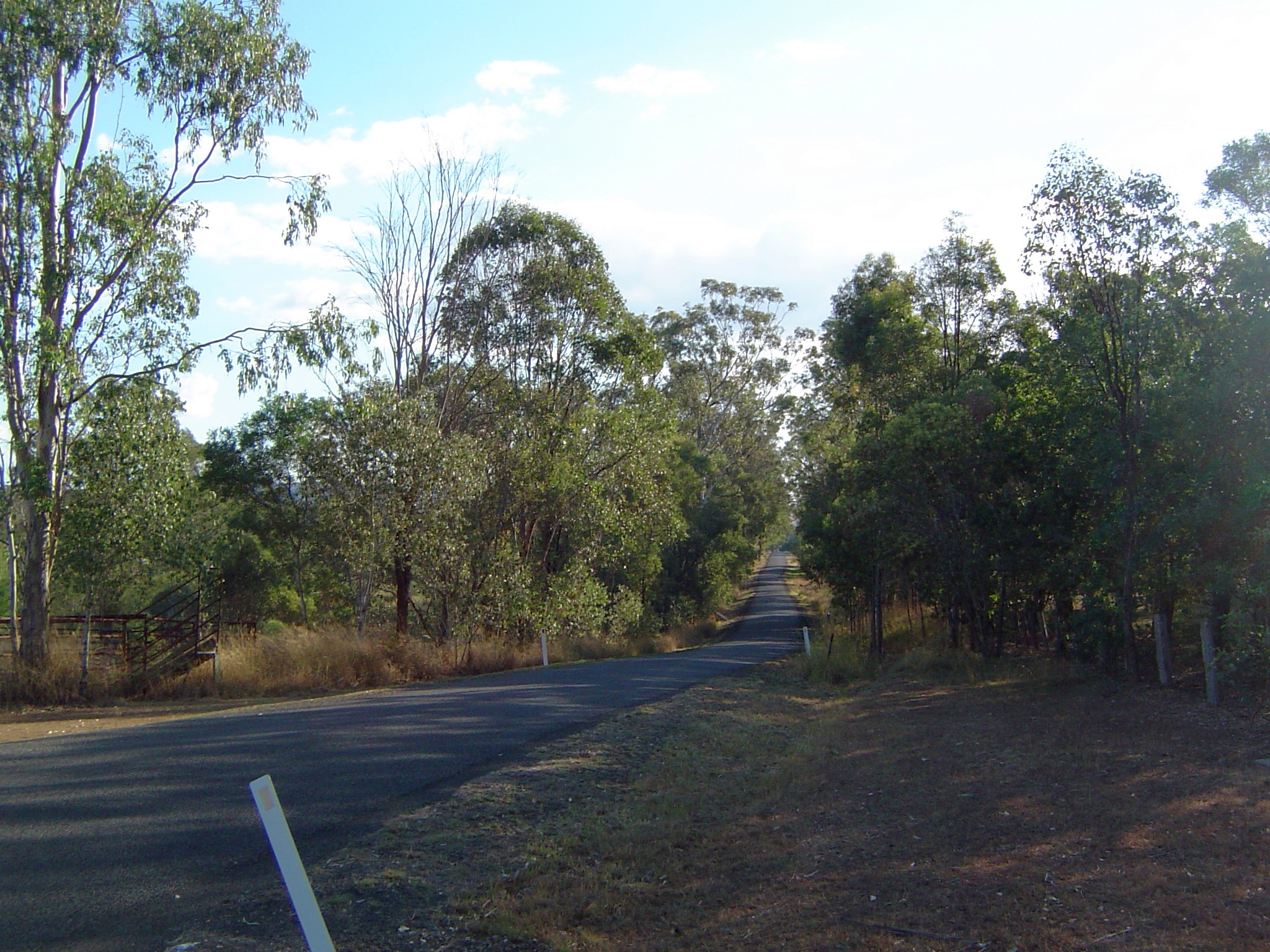
- Beethams Road, 2014

- Interactive map of Ironbark
- Coordinates: 27.5555°S 152.675°E
- Country: Australia
- State: Queensland
- City: Ipswich
- LGA: City of Ipswich
- Location: 14.4 km (8.9 mi) NW of Ipswich CBD; 50.5 km (31.4 mi) W of Brisbane CBD

Government
  - State electorate: Ipswich West
  - Federal division: Blair

Area
  - Total: 15.1 km^{2} (5.8 sq mi)

Population
  - Total: 1,173 (2021 census)
  - Density: 77.68/km^{2} (201.2/sq mi)
- Time zone: UTC+10:00 (AEST)
- Postcode: 4306
Suburbs around Ironbark
Haigslea	Glamorganvale	Wanora
Haigslea	Ironbark	Pine Mountain
Haigslea	Walloon	Blacksoil; Karrabin; Walloon

Ironbark is a rural locality in the City of Ipswich, Queensland, Australia. In the 2021 census, Ironbark had a population of 1,173 people.

== Geography ==
The eastern boundary of Ironbark is marked by the Brisbane Valley Highway and the southern boundary follows the Warrego Highway. Haigslea–Amberley Road runs south through Walloon from the southwest corner.

== History ==
Borallon Correctional Centre opened in 1990, but closed in 2011. Following redevelopment, it reopened in 2016 as Borallon Training and Correctional Centre.

== Demographics ==
In the 2016 census, Ironbark had a population of 604 people.

In the 2021 census, Ironbark had a population of 1,173 people.

== Education ==
There are no schools in Ironbark. The nearest government primary schools are Haigslea State School in neighbouring Haigslea to the west, Glamorgan Vale State School in neighbouring Glamorgan Vale to the north-west, and Brassall State School in Brassall to the south-east. The nearest government secondary schools are Ipswich State High School in Brassall to the south-east and Lowood State High School in Lowood to the north-west.

== Facilities ==
Borallon Training and Correctional Centre is a high-security prison for remand and sentenced prisoners at 75 Ivan Lane (27.5494°S 152.6747°E).

Borallon Prison Wastewater Treatment Plant is a sewage treatment plant (27.5472°S 152.6725°E).
