= Vernor, Queensland =

Vernor
- Suburb
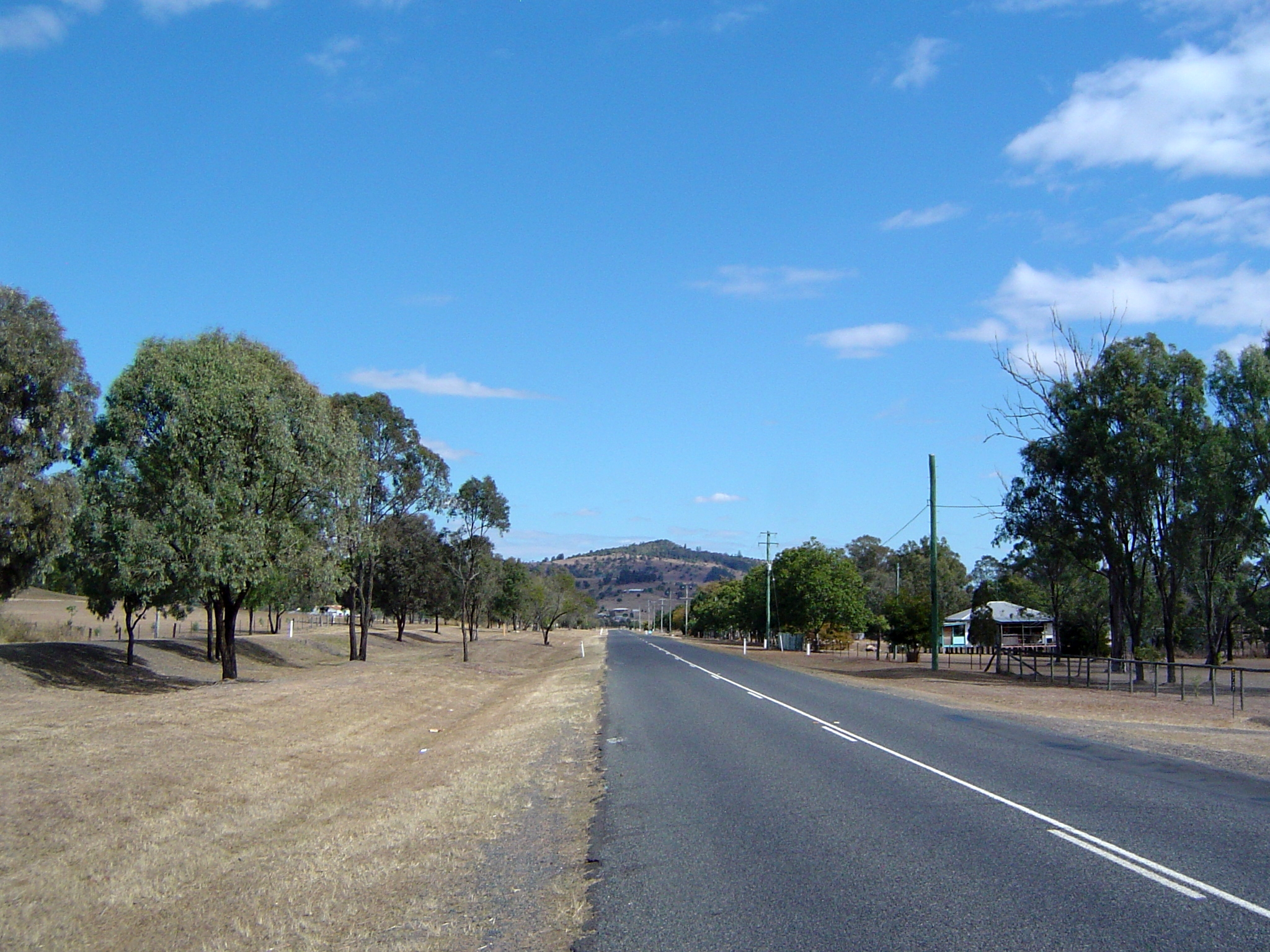
- Forest Hill-Fernvale Road, 2014

- Interactive map of Vernor
- Coordinates: 27.4733°S 152.6177°E
- Country: Australia
- State: Queensland
- City: Somerset Region
- LGA: Somerset Region
- Location: 28.8 km (17.9 mi) NW of Ipswich; 41.8 km (26.0 mi) SSE of Esk; 68.5 km (42.6 mi) W of Brisbane

Government
  - State electorate: Lockyer
  - Federal division: Blair

Area
  - Total: 9.0 km^{2} (3.5 sq mi)

Population
  - Total: 235 (2021 census)
  - Density: 26.11/km^{2} (67.6/sq mi)
- Time zone: UTC+10:00 (AEST)
- Postcode: 4306
Suburbs around Vernor
Wivenhoe Pocket	Wivenhoe Pocket	Fernvale
Lowood	Vernor	Fernvale
Glamorgan Vale	Glamorgan Vale	Fairney View

Vernor is a rural locality in the Somerset Region, Queensland, Australia. In the 2021 census, Vernor had a population of 235 people.

== Geography ==
Vernor is bounded to the north-west by the Brisbane River.

Forest Hill Fernvale Road enters the locality from the west (Lowood) and exits to the north-east (Fernvale).

== History ==
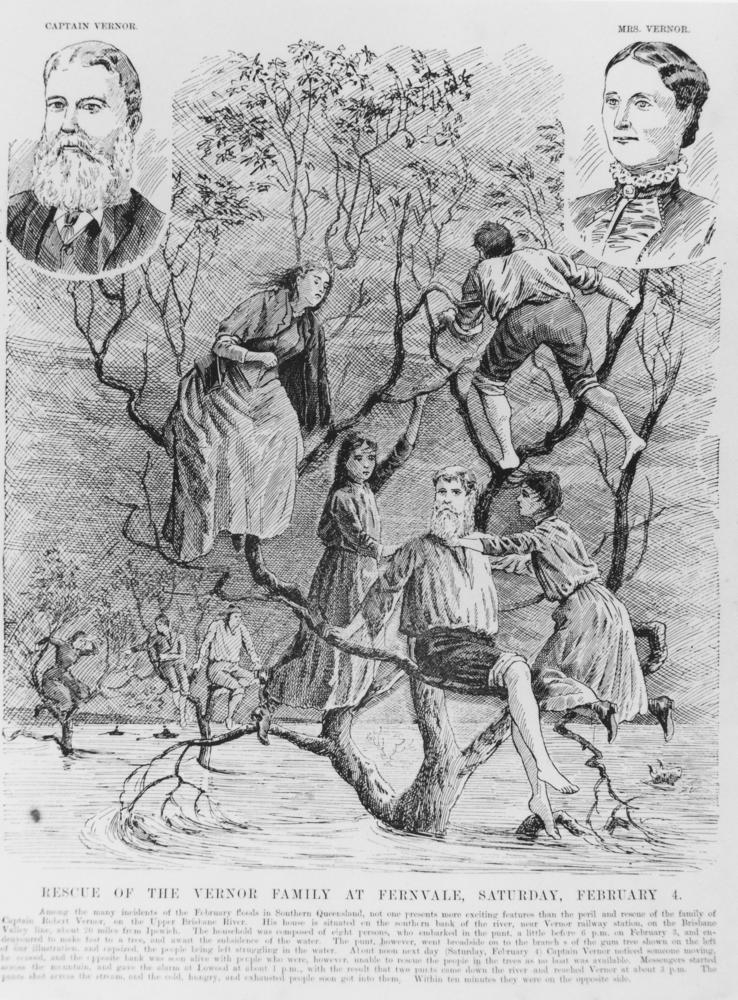
Engraving of the Vernor family rescued during the February flood near Fernvale, 1893

Vernor takes its name from its former railway station, named after selector Robert Vernor, who took up Portion 39A parish of Burnett on 15 July 1868. Vernor was a soldier who had served in the Connaught Rangers in the British Army.

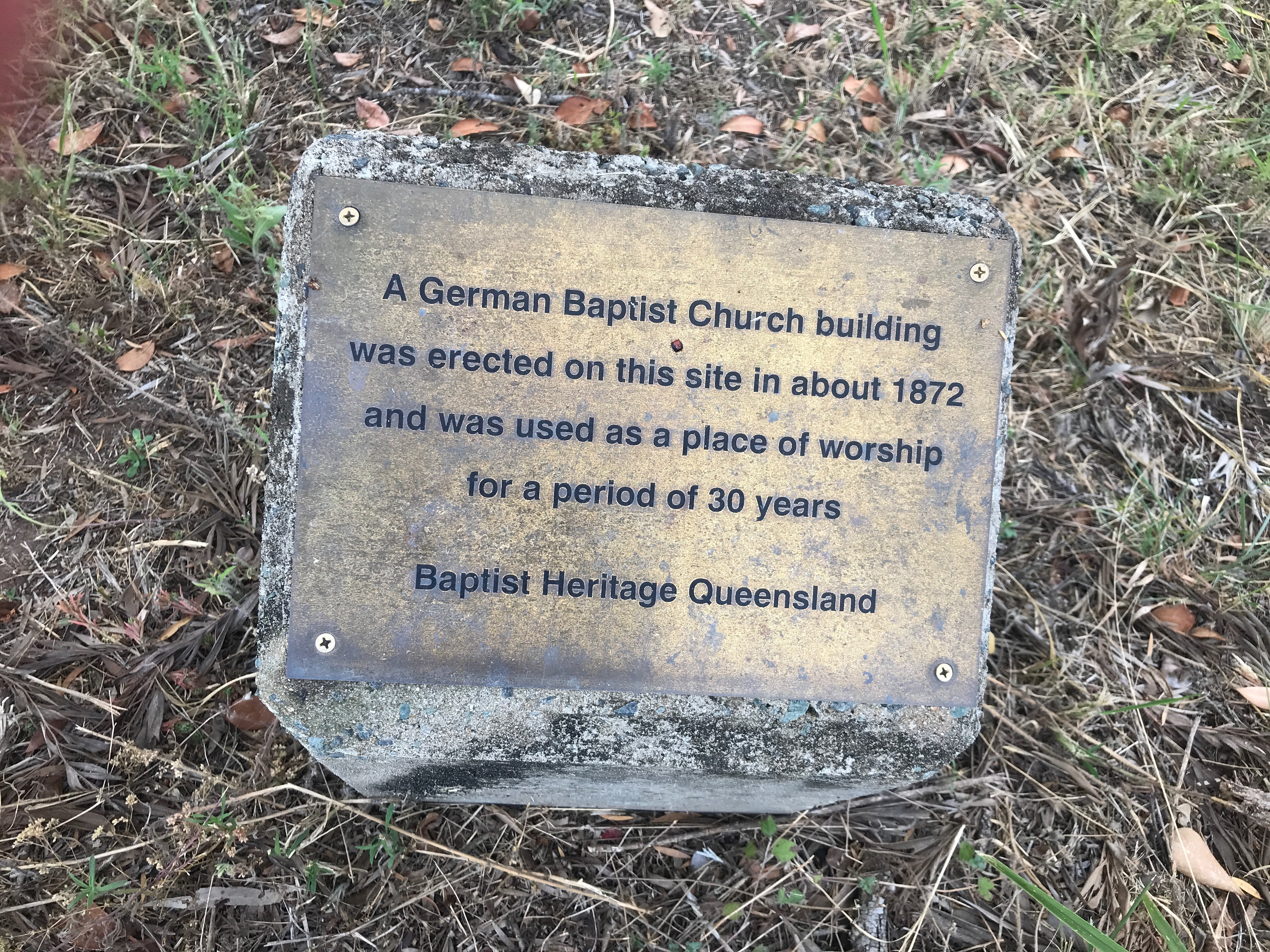
Plaque for Vernor German Baptist Church, 2023

The Brisbane River Baptist Church (also known as Vernor German Baptist Church) opened on 5 September 1873. It was a 30-by-20-foot (9.1 by 6.1 m) timber church and could seat 100 people. It was at 109-112 Fernvale Road (27.45851°S 152.62625°E). The church closed in 1920. A plaque was placed at the site by Baptist Heritage Queensland in 2004.

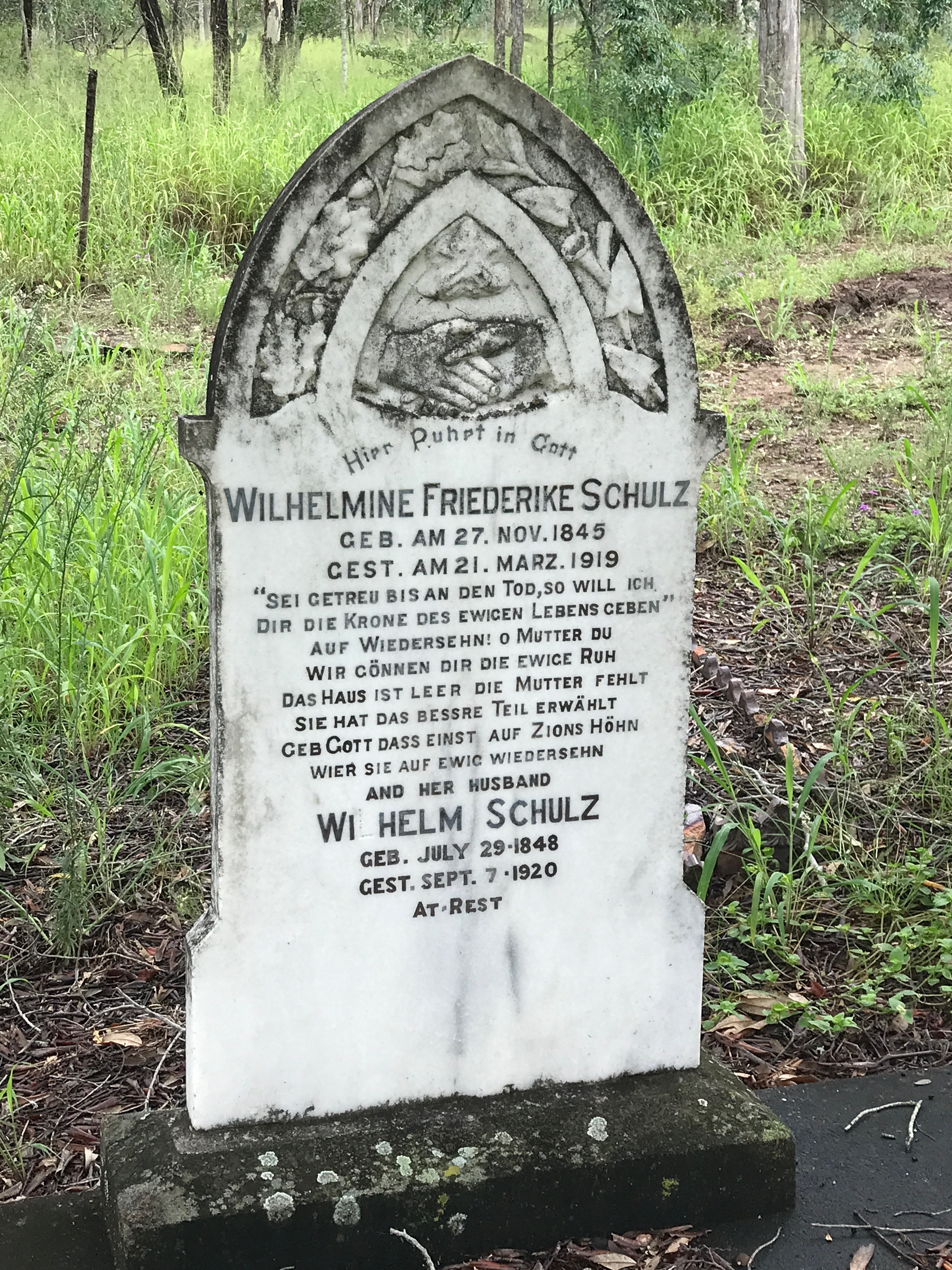
Headstone for Wilhelmine Fredericke Schulz and husband Wilhelm Schulz, Vernon Baptist Cemetery, 2022

Associated with the church was the Vernor German Baptist Cemetery which was established in 1876 and operated until 1954.

The first section of the Brisbane Valley railway line from Wulkuraka to Lowood was opened on 16 June 1884 with Vernor railway station (27.4659°S 152.6082°E) being one of the stops along the route. That section of the line closed in 1993 and the railway corridor repurposed as part of the Brisbane Valley Rail Trail. The Vernor railway station no longer exists.

In the 1893 floods the Vernor family was initially unconcerned as they had not had difficulty in copy with the 1890 floods. However as the flood waters rose, Vernor rowed the eight people in his household to the stables in the belief that the loft in the stables would remain after the flood waters. However, the flood water rose so that they were not safe in the loft and Vernor rowed them to a tree where they tried to their boat to the tree hoping to ride out the flood in the boat. However, the flood was too powerful and they could not make fast to the tree so their boat was carried down out of their control down the river until it crashed into the upper branches of a gum tree, leaving the household struggling in the water, until some of them managed to climb onto the tree. They then proceeded to climb into higher and higher branches of the tree as the waters rose, ripping their clothing to twist into ropes to help them climb. They spent nearly a day and a half in the top of the tree until neighbours were able to rescue them in a boat.

== Demographics ==
In the 2006 census, Vernor had a population of 279 people.

In the 2016 census, Vernor had a population of 233 people.

In the 2021 census, Vernor had a population of 235 people.

== Education ==
There are no schools in Vernor. The nearest government primary schools are Fernvale State School in neighbouring Fernvale to the north-east, Glamorgan Vale State School in neighbouring Glamorgan Vale to the south, and Lowood State School in Lowood to the west. The nearest government secondary school is Lowood State High School in neighbouring Lowood to the west.

== Facilities ==
Vernor German Baptist Cemetery is at 59 Old Fernvale Road (27.4550°S 152.6304°E).
