= Fernvale, Queensland =

Fernvale
- Town
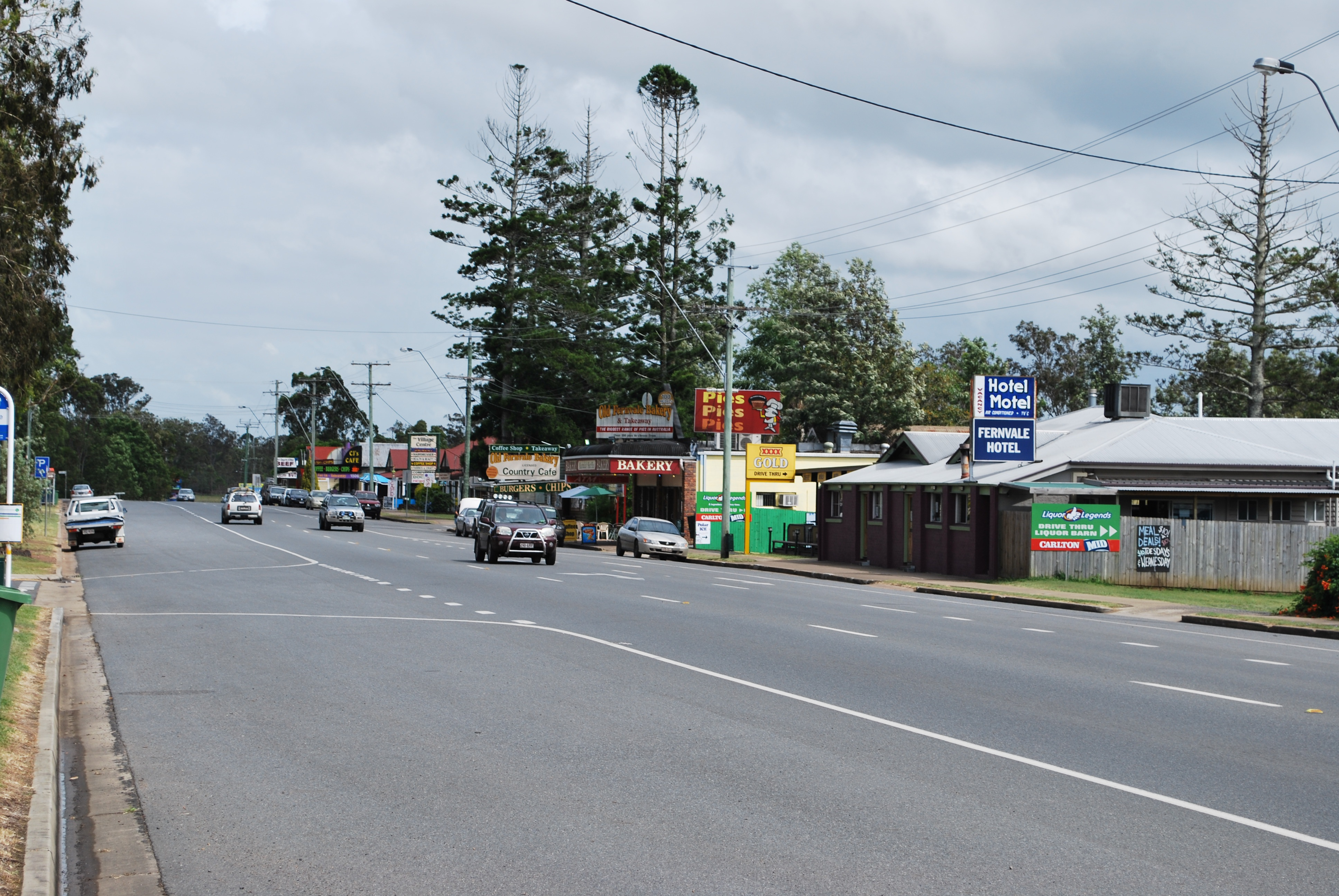
- Brisbane Valley Highway, Fernvale

- Interactive map of Fernvale
- Coordinates: 27.4552°S 152.6513°E
- Country: Australia
- State: Queensland
- LGA: Somerset Region
- Location: 24.5 km (15.2 mi) NNW of Ipswich CBD; 39.5 km (24.5 mi) SE of Esk; 61.0 km (37.9 mi) W of Brisbane CBD

Government
  - State electorate: Lockyer
  - Federal division: Blair

Area
  - Total: 27.8 km^{2} (10.7 sq mi)

Population
  - Total: 3,629 (2021 census)
  - Density: 130.54/km^{2} (338.1/sq mi)
- Time zone: UTC+10:00 (AEST)
- Postcode: 4306
Localities around Fernvale
Wivenhoe Pocket	England Creek	Banks Creek
Vernor	Fernvale	Lake Manchester
Vernor	Fairney View	Borallon

Fernvale is a rural town and locality in the Somerset Region, Queensland, Australia. In the 2021 census, the locality of Fernvale had a population of 3,629 people.

It is a rapidly developing rural township located within the urban footprint of the South East Queensland Regional Plan 2009–2031.

== Geography ==
Approximately 60 kilometres (37 mi) west of Brisbane, Fernvale lies on the Brisbane River in the southern part of Somerset Region. The town acts as a centre for the adjacent areas of Fairney View, Vernor and Wivenhoe Pocket.

== History ==
=== Aboriginal ===
Fernvale falls within the area formerly occupied by the Indigenous Jagera people.

Just upstream from Fernvale is a significant archaeological site known as Platypus Rockshelter, a double chambered weathered cavity in conglomerate cliff, now largely inundated by Wivenhoe Dam. The site was excavated as a salvage operation in the late 1970s. Excavation recovered thousands of stone artifacts, associated with large amounts of shellfish (predominantly freshwater mussel), mammal, bird, reptile, amphibian and fish bones.

=== European settlement ===
Following the British Government’s establishment of a penal settlement where the city of Brisbane now stands, an embargo was placed on the occupation of land within fifty miles of the ‘closed’ penal establishment. Several officers of the colony made journeys of exploration up the Brisbane River, passing through the area which would become Fernvale. After Allan Cunningham's discovery in 1828 of Cunninghams Gap a wave of squatters travelled from Sydney via the inland areas of New England and the Darling Downs, bringing sheep to settle on the rich pastures of the Brisbane Valley, taking up runs of tens of thousands of acres.

When the embargo was lifted in 1842, the first Europeans to select land and settle in the Fernvale area were Edmund Blucher Uhr and his brother, whose river frontage run they called Fernie Lawn. This large, unfenced holding which included the area now known as Fernvale was purchased from the Uhr brothers by the North family early in 1843. Wivenhoe, the adjoining station higher up the Brisbane River, was then taken up by Edmund Blucher Uhr and J. S. Ferriter until it too was bought by the North family in 1849. Part of this land was called North’s Pocket, now known as Wivenhoe Pocket.

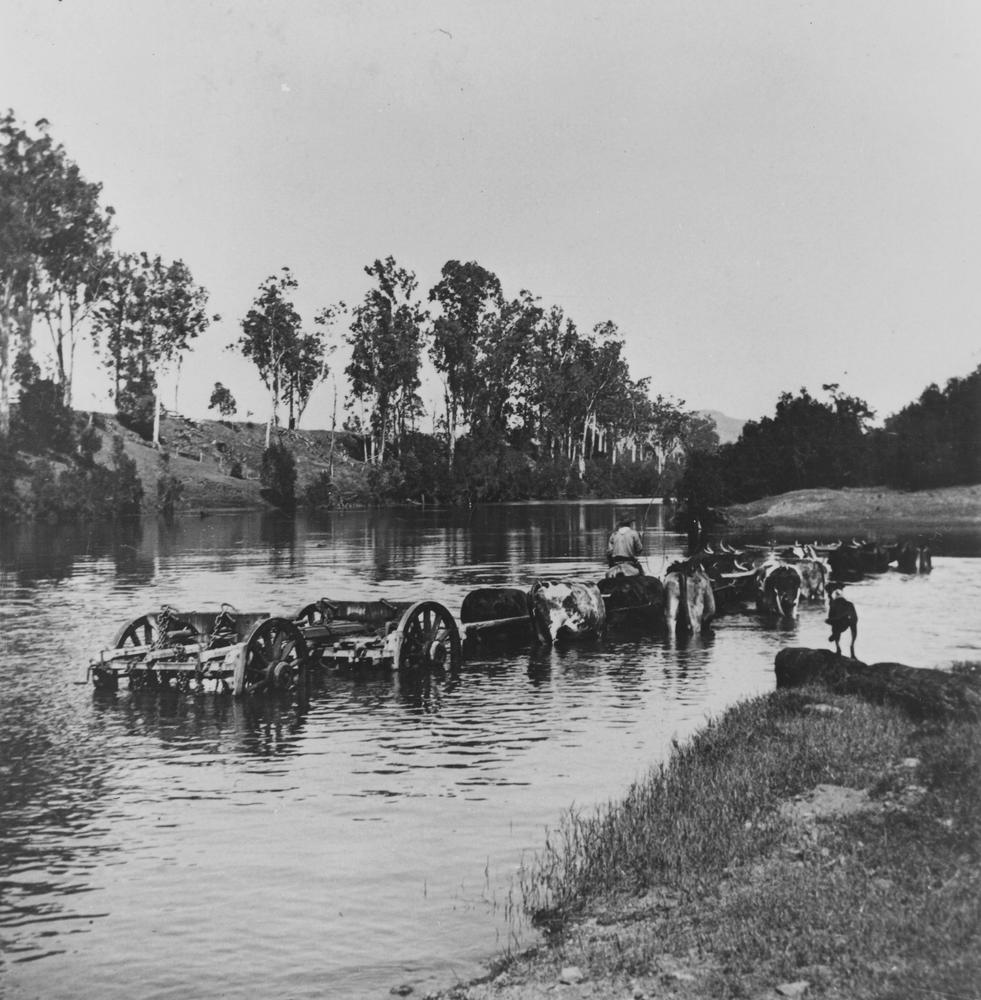
Bullock team crossing the Brisbane River, Fernvale, 1914

The future township of Fernvale became a known stop for bullock wagons and cattle drovers, who frequently camped by the river overnight before crossing en route to the rapidly growing timber and grazing areas to the north.

When New South Wales passed the Agricultural Reserves Act 1861 and a new wave of settlers moved into the area, Fernie Lawn was divided into smaller selections, with land for sale at £1 per acre and cultivation and fencing to be carried out by the purchaser. These first selectors were predominantly Scots and English, followed by the end of the 1860s by increasing numbers of German settlers. Descendants of many of these early settlers remain in the area today. Farmers engaged in mixed cropping and dairying, and cotton was widely grown in the area in response to the world shortage caused by the American Civil War. Cotton ginneries were established by Carl Sahl at Fernie Lawn and by Cribb & Foote at Stinking Gully. Fernvale at the time consisted of two areas - Harrisborough, named after Harris Brothers cotton stores, and Stinking Gully named after the water course which separated the two areas. By 1875, it had become known as Fernvale. The name Stinking Gully was officially changed to Ferny Gully in 1930.

The old blacksmith, the tennis court (made by hand from termites nests and river water), the first bakery, Cribb and Foote’s store, the earliest churches, have all gone. But the butcher shop, first opened in remains unchanged, the old dance hall is now ‘Down to a Tea’ tea rooms, and the new ‘Old Fernvale Bakery’ has an interesting collection in its café of memorabilia and photos of days gone by.

In 1869, the first German Baptist church services, at first known as the Church of Christ, began in Fernvale followed by the first Methodist church in the Brisbane Valley at Fernvale in 1871. In 1886, the Church of Christ built a new church two miles away at Vernor. Catholic and Anglican services were continued for some time by itinerant priests who travelled widely through the Brisbane Valley.

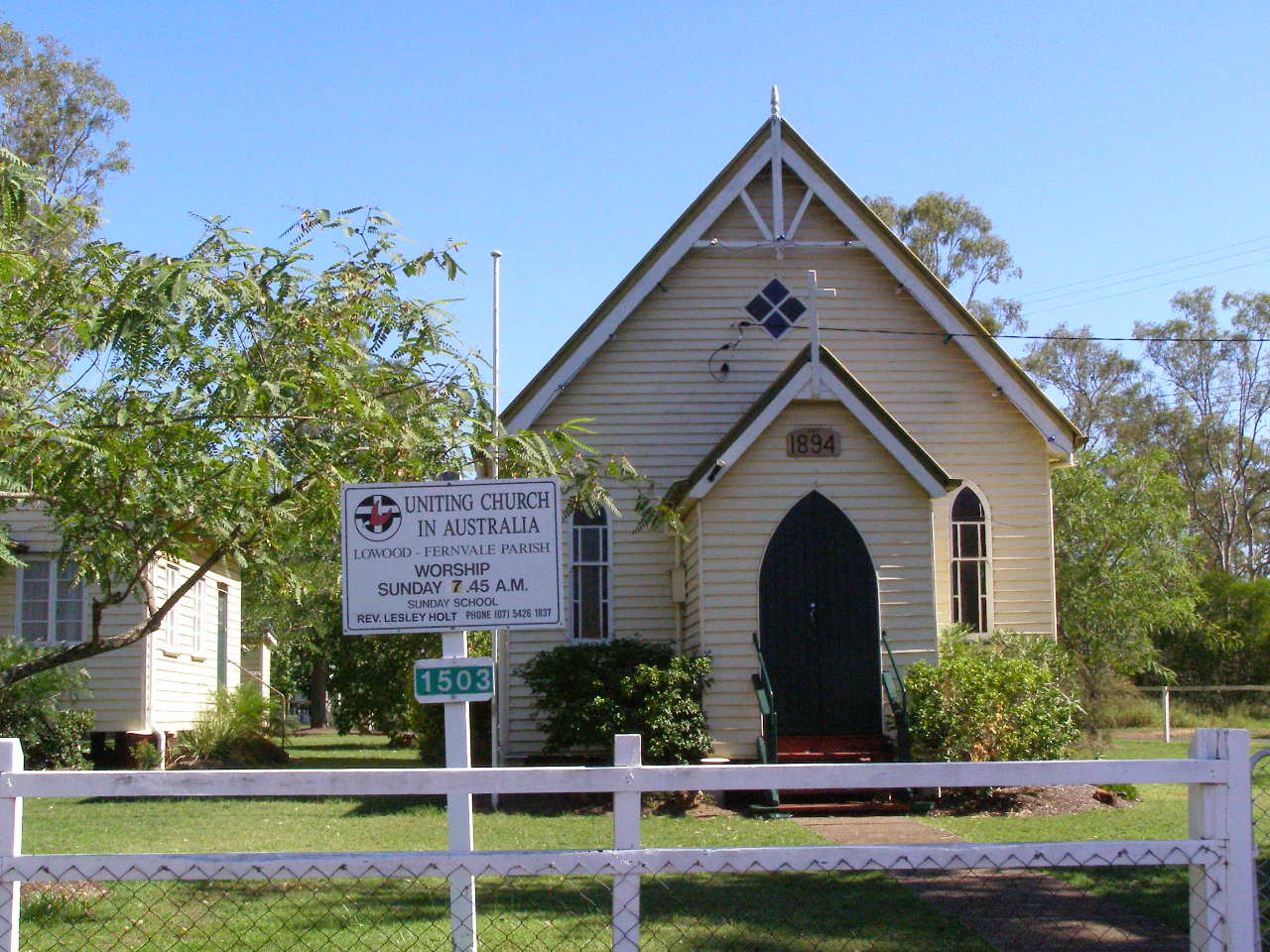
1894 Fernvale Methodist/Uniting Church, 2006

The first Methodist church in the Brisbane Valley was built at Fernvale in 1872, on land close to the river, donated by Emmanuel Denman. The Primitive Methodist Chapel was moved to the present site on the Brisbane Valley Highway in 1882 due to its vulnerability to floods. Another larger church was built in 1894, becoming part of the Methodist Church in the amalgamation of 1902 and then part of the Uniting Church in Australia in 1977, occupying that site (1503 Brisbane Valley Highway) until December 2012. This 1894 church building and its hall were then donated by the Uniting Church to the Fernvale Lions Club, for the building of a community centre, and were moved across the road to 6 Clive Street (27.4538°S 152.6502°E) as the first stage of a Lions Park. A new Uniting Church building was then built on the highway site during 2013 and was dedicated by the then Queensland Moderator of the Uniting Church, Rev Kaye Ronalds, on 26 October 2013. The 1894 church and hall were officially opened on 2 March 2019 by Shayne Neumann, Federal Member for Blair, as the Fernvale Lions Centre.

Fernvale School opened as Harrisborough School in 1874, in an eighty by twenty feet cotton store purchased along with a four roomed separate building and two forty acre blocks of land, for £400 from cotton merchants J & G Harris. At the time, Fernvale comprised two separate areas: Harrisborough, named after the Harris Brothers stores, and Stinking Gully named after the watercourse which separated the two areas. Although the town changed its name to Fernvale when the new Telegraph Office opened in 1879, the school retained the old name until 1889, the last establishment in the town to change. When the first headmaster, Thomas Barrett Guppy, opened the school on 11 May 1874, he found that all of the children were picking cotton and none attended the new school until after the cotton harvest was in. The school opened with fifty-four pupils, most of them from German-speaking families. In 1910, ten acres of the original eighty were fenced in, and in 1915, the old Harris Brothers store no longer being safe, a new school was built and the old building sold and removed. Various attempts have been made to move the school closer to the centre of Fernvale but it remains where it started.

The Wivenhoe post office had its name changed to Fernvale in 1877. In 1879 the Fernvale Post Office was a combined post and telegraph office in Cribb and Foote’s Store, where Abraham Phelps was manager. In those early days, when isolation meant that news from overseas was anxiously awaited, mail was brought by bullock team, and later by horse-drawn coach. When the railway line was built through the district, the post office was transferred across the road to the Phelps home, adjacent to the railway station. Mail was delivered onwards to outlying farms by mail contractors, at first on horseback or by horse and cart, and later by car. In 1963, a new Postmaster, Mr Noonan, took over the Post Office in Fernvale after 84 years of faithful service by the Phelps family.

In 1884, the Brisbane Valley railway line opened as far as Lowood, later continuing to Esk and eventually as far as Blackbutt, allowing fast efficient transport of produce to the markets in Brisbane and Ipswich. The first stage, from Ipswich to Lowood, opened in 1884 and the last train ran in 1989. There was a time when these yards buzzed with horse-drawn carts and bullock wagons bringing in the produce of the surrounding farms to be loaded on the trains for transport to the markets of Ipswich and Brisbane. The Brisbane Valley line survived for a century, until 1989. The line has been removed and the Brisbane Valley Rail Trail created over much of its length. The stationmaster’s house was in Clive Street until 2019 when it was demolished.

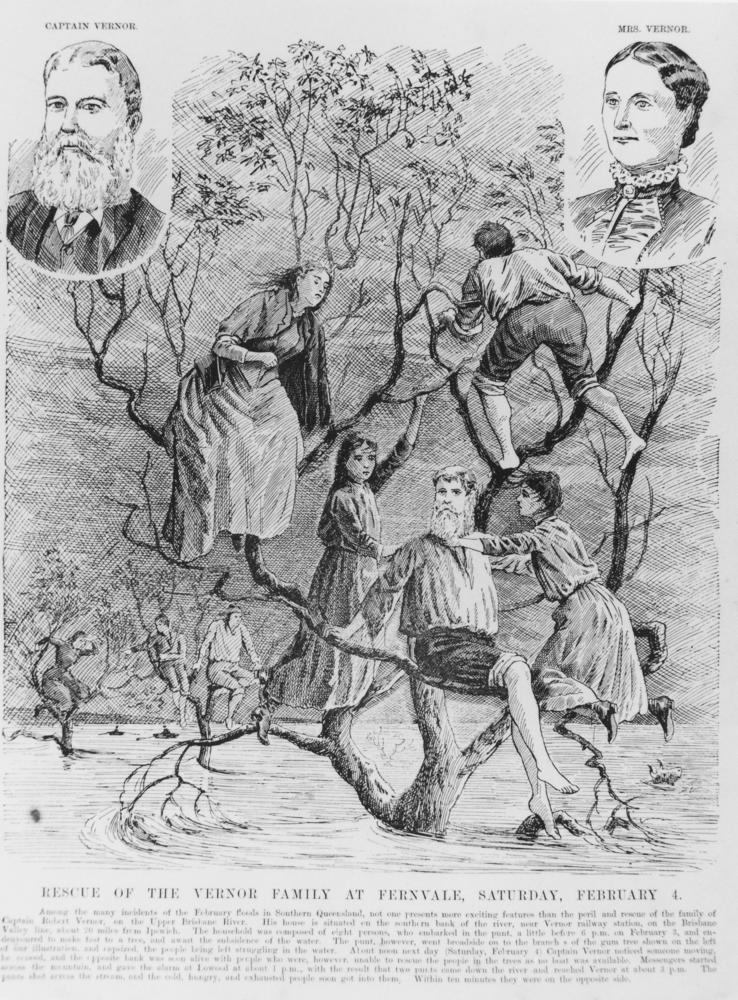
An engraving depicting the Vernor family rescue

The Brisbane River valley has always been troubled by alternating drought and flood, and Fernvale and Wivenhoe Pocket have several times been inundated, with many homes and buildings washed away. In the devastating flood of 1893 the flood reached a height of about 24 feet (7.3 m) above the 1890 flood level and occurred so rapidly that little could be saved.

Work commenced on building an Anglican church in June 1895. On Friday 7 August 1895 St Mark's Anglican Church was dedicated by Bishop William Webber. The name St Mark's had a local significance as it was the name of the church at Wivenhoe Pocket which was washed away in the 1893 Queensland flood. The church was at 2 Macauley Street (corner of Erkine Street, 27.4561°S 152.6510°E). It closed in 1934 and in 1936 the building was sold to the Queensland Government for £50 and it was relocated to Somerset Dam, where, after renovating and re-roofing, it was dedicated once again as St Mark's Anglican Church on 30 August 1936 by Archbishop William Wand. The £50 was given to construct a new Anglican church at Hidden Vale.

Social life and sport in Fernvale were always strong. In the last years of the nineteenth century ploughing competitions were held near the river crossing. Town sports days brought people in from outlying districts, and the Fernvale cricket, tennis and football teams were keenly followed. During and between the World Wars numerous fund-raising dances and music evenings were held in the Old Fernvale Hall.

The scene of dances, balls, musical evenings, wedding receptions and fetes, the Old Fernvale Hall was the centre of social life in Fernvale from 1934 through to the 1980s, when it was replaced by the new, and larger, community hall. During the depression years dances and fund raising evenings were run by local personality Mr August Stumer.

Following World War II a shortage of men and materials led to a drift away from the area. Dairying has been replaced by beef cattle, and a small amount of mixed cropping continues in the surrounding farmlands.

Fernvale held its first campdraft in 1947 on part of Mr Mat Powell’s property and the Fernvale Campdraft Association was formed.

In the 1980s, the building of the Wivenhoe Dam brought new employment and families into the area.

Since 1985, the showgrounds is home to the Lowood-Fernvale Pony Club.

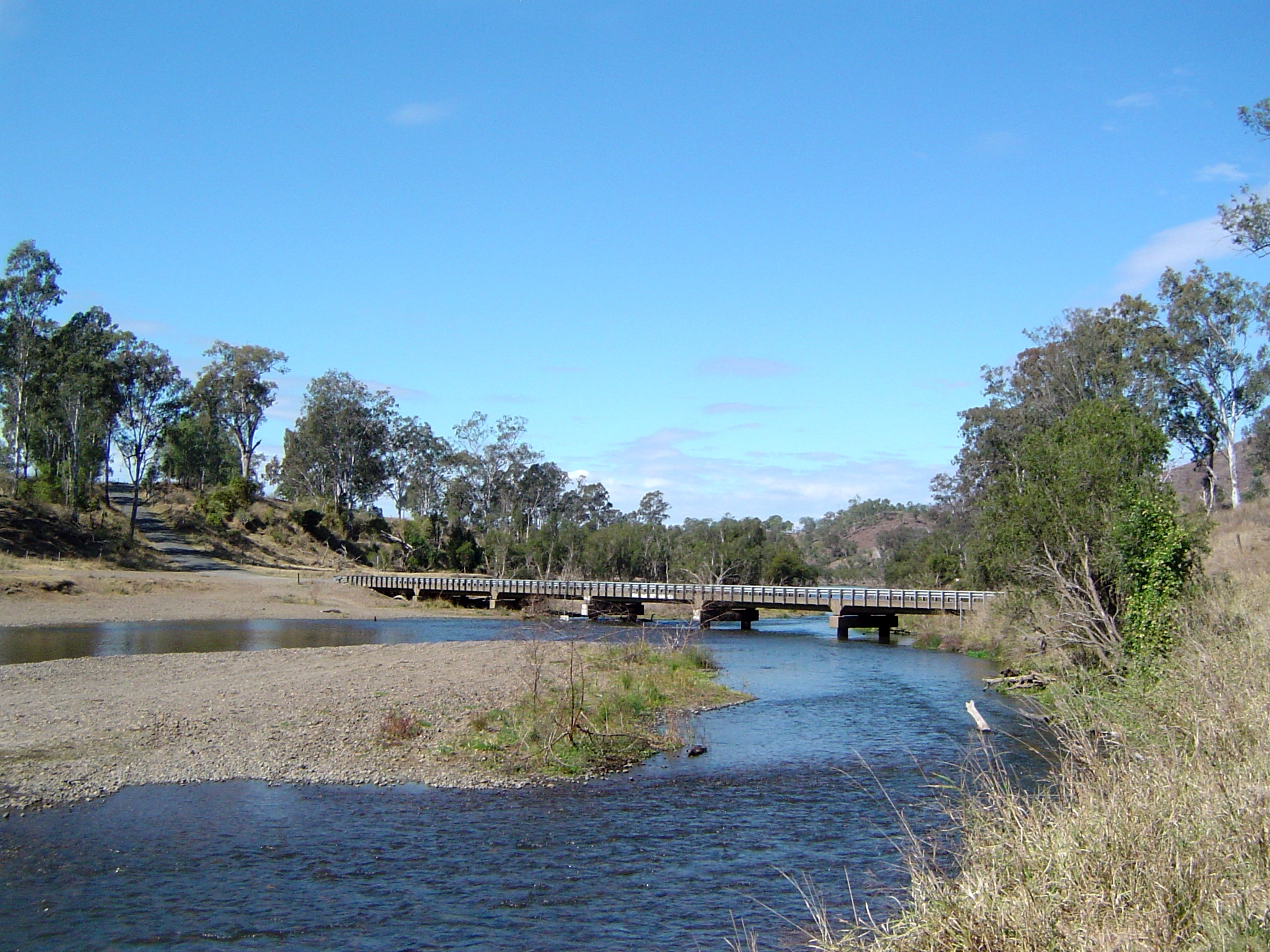
Savages Crossing over the Brisbane River, 2014

On 7 December 2002, the 8.3 kilometres (5.2 mi) Fernvale to Lowood section of the disused Brisbane Valley Railway opened as part of the Brisbane Valley Rail Trail a 148 kilometres (92 mi) recreation trail from Ipswich to Blackbutt which provides walkers, cyclists and horse riders an opportunity to experience the history and landscape of the Brisbane River Valley.

In 2005, when the Wivenhoe Alliance completed its upgrade of nearby Wivenhoe Dam, South East Queensland’s primary water supply and flood mitigation dam, the upgrade was completed six months ahead of schedule and 10% below budget. Wivenhoe Alliance approached the then Esk Shire Council to see if the money could be used in a project that would benefit the community of Fernvale. The Fernvale Futures Partnership was formed. The Fernvale Memorial Park was upgraded and the Fernvale Futures Complex (27.4555°S 152.6523°E) was built on the site of old Fernvale railway station (27.4555°S 152.6522°E) and was designed to have a similar shape; it was opened in September 2006. In 2011, Fernvale Futures Complex was converted into a temporary shelter and Flood Relief Centre for families affected by the Brisbane River flood.

The Fernvale Memorial Park was upgraded to its present standard in 2006 as part of the Wivenhoe Alliance legacy project following the upgrade of the Wivenhoe Dam.

The Fernvale Indoor Sports Centre, opened in 2010, incorporates a gymnasium and a four court sports stadium, offering indoor cricket, futsal, netball, indoor touch football, junior indoor sports and cheerleading. The Brisbane Valley Rail Trail, for horse-riding, cycling and walking, may be accessed at Fernvale Memorial Park.

In 2011, the town was once again badly affected by floods, with one hundred and twelve homes inundated in Fernvale and twenty-five in Vernor. Residents also described an abundance of snakes in the floods.

On 26 October 2013, the Uniting Church congregations of Lowood and Fernvale combined and dedicated a new church in Fernvale.

== Demographics ==
In the 2016 census, the locality of Fernvale had a population of 3,209 people.

In the 2021 census, the locality of Fernvale had a population of 3,629 people.

== Education ==
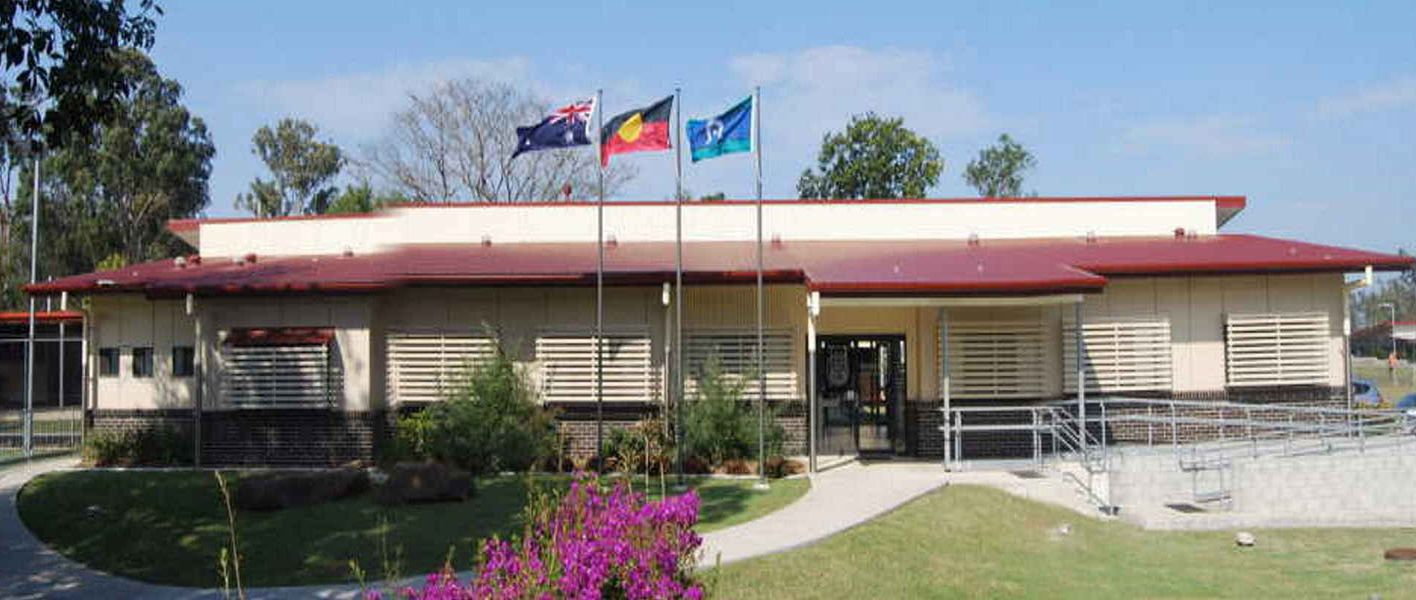
Fernvale State School, 2024

Fernvale State School is a government primary (Prep–6) school for boys and girls at 1605 Brisbane Valley Highway (27.4467°S 152.6441°E). In 2018, the school had an enrolment of 580 students with 43 teachers (38 full-time equivalent) and 27 non-teaching staff (15 full-time equivalent). It includes a special education program.

There is no secondary school in Fernvale. The nearest government secondary school is Lowood State High School in Lowood to the west.

== Amenities ==
The Fernvale Lowood Uniting Church is at 1503 Brisbane Valley Highway (27.4540°S 152.6508°E).

Fernvale Community Church holds Sunday morning services in the Fernvale Community Hall.

== Attractions ==
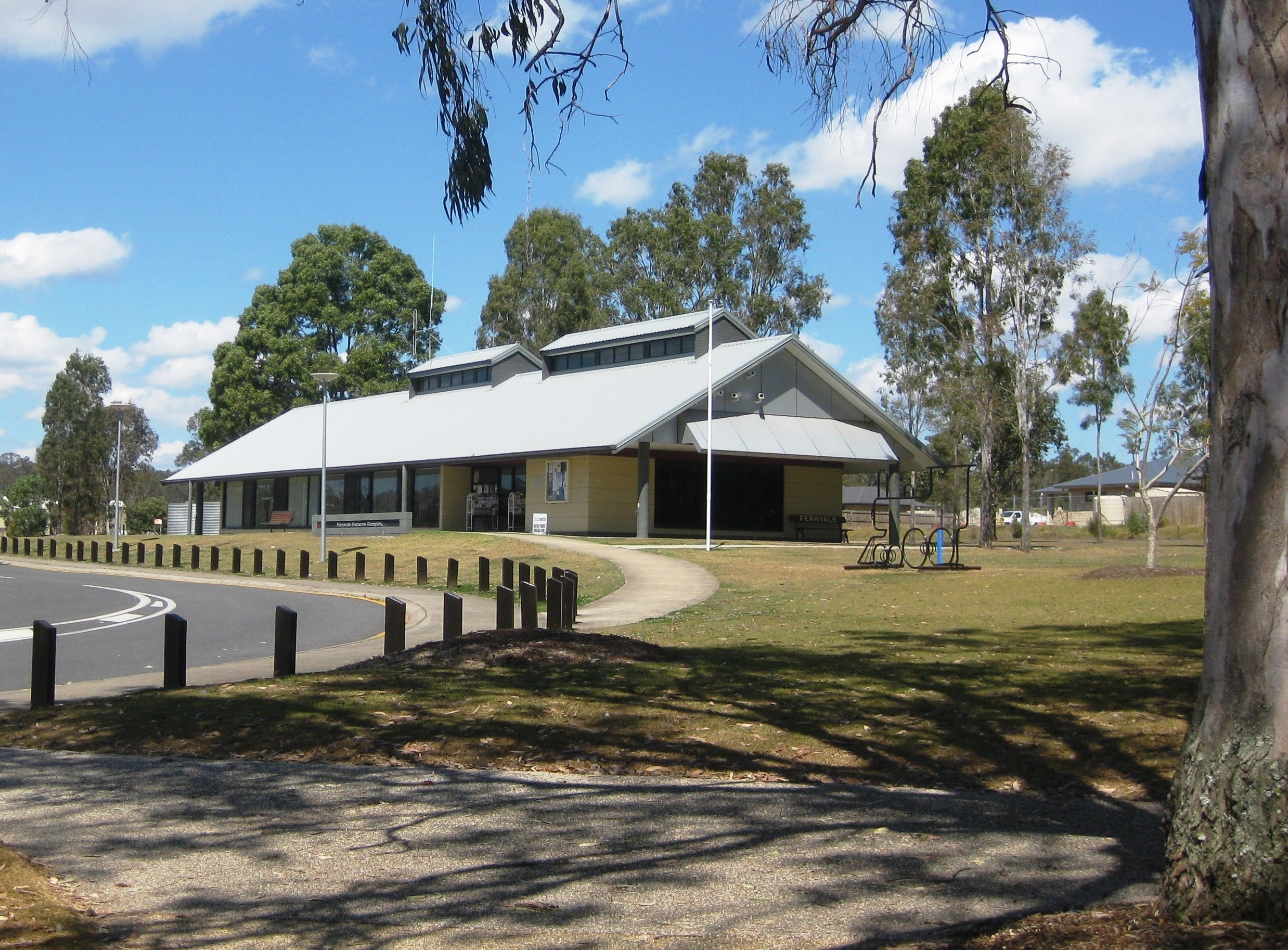
Fernvale Futures Complex, 2012

The Fernvale Futures Complex incorporates an accredited tourist information centre staffed by a team of volunteers and has facilities for meetings and conferences, with smaller rooms for visiting specialists and counselling. The complex also serves the community in such diverse ways as providing public access to computers and printing services, meeting rooms for social groups, training courses, workshops and exhibitions.

The Old Fernvale Bakery is located on the Brisbane Valley highway and has become a local landmark offering a selection of over 170 different varieties of pies. It has won awards for its pies.

Fishing, swimming and non-motorised water sports are permitted on nearby Wivenhoe Dam. Since the 2011 floods debris remains in the river, making the formerly popular sport of canoeing temporarily hazardous. River access points close to the town may be found at Savages Crossing, Geoff Fisher Bridge and Twin Bridges.

With the emergence of two 2nd hand shops in Fernvale with a strong selection of used books, Fernvale is slowly setting itself up as a rural book town, worthy of attracting day-trippers from Brisbane especially on the weekends.

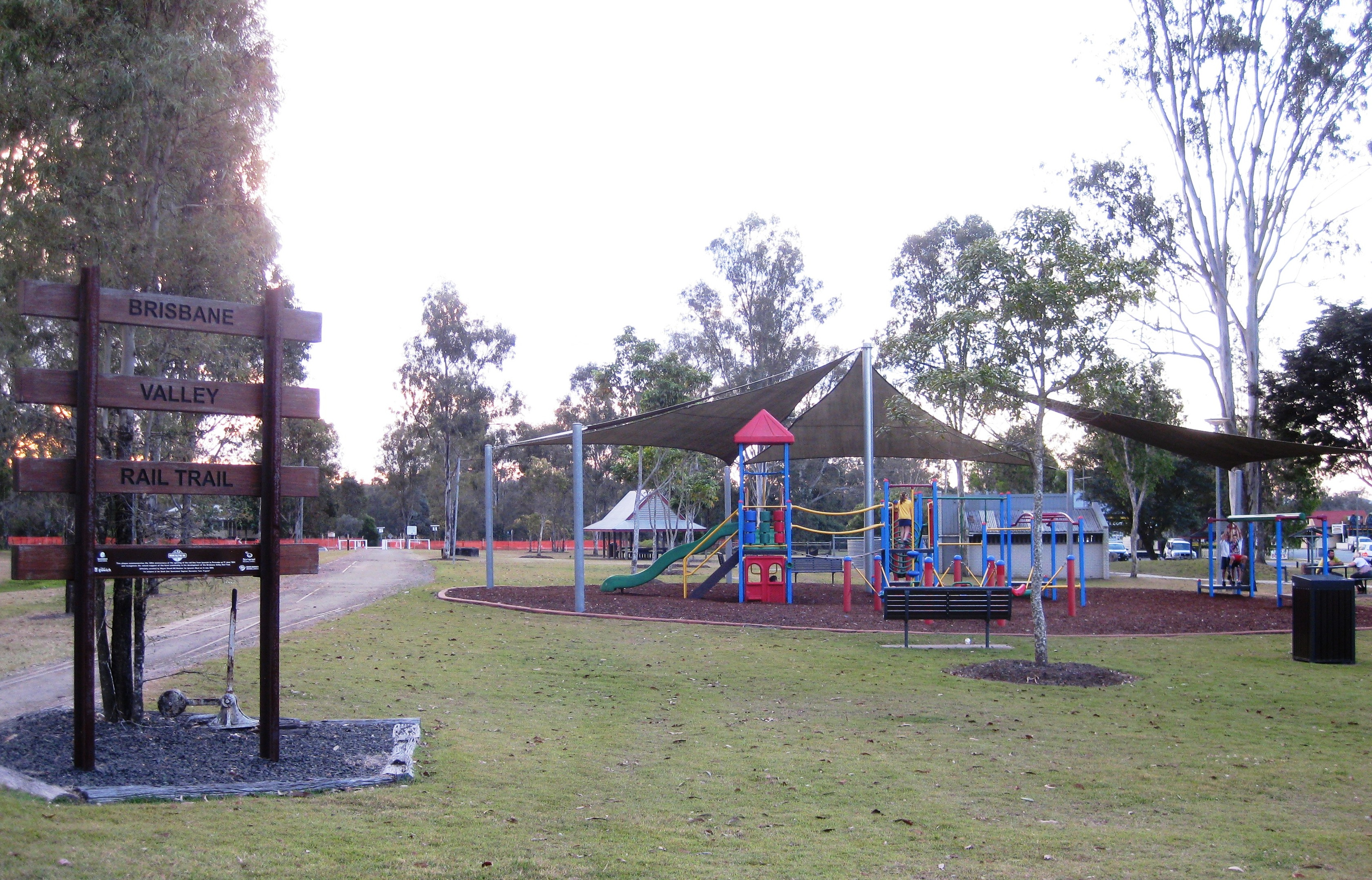
Fernvale Memorial Park

The Fernvale Memorial Park stands on the site of the old railway goods yards in the centre of Fernvale, adjacent to the Fernvale Futures Centre, and offers a children’s playground, picnic tables, car parking, toilets, and access to the Brisbane Valley Rail Trail. Traces of the days of rail transport can still be seen in the park. Some steel track remains, and a lever for switching trains to a loop siding. The siding led to a crane which swivelled by means of a wheel running on a circular rail. A hand-held rope on the 'bundle of goods' was all that was needed to guide the crane, the base of which still remains in the park, a small octagonal concrete platform close to the public car park. Corn, pumpkins, potatoes, fruit, timber, all manner of produce was loaded here. A cream shed stood where the picnic tables are today, and cattle yards held beef cattle which had been walked in by drovers from outlying grazing properties, ready to be loaded into the wagons. The Post Office collected mail each day from the train, an improvement on the days when it came by bullock wagon.

== Events ==
An annual campdraft is held every year in March at the Fernvale Showgrounds (Colin Powell Reserve).

Each year in July around 800 people assemble in the park to take part in the Fernvale-Lowood Rail Trail Fun Run to raise funds for Diabetes Queensland.

Every Sunday morning, from 6am until noon, the Fernvale Markets are open in the Fernvale Primary School grounds. The country markets feature more than a hundred stalls selling fruit and vegetables, often direct from the local farmer, homemade preserves, second hand goods and books, local crafts, handmade soaps, pets and poultry and a large variety of plants. The market is run by the school’s Parents and Citizens Association and has been operating since 1988.

== Transport ==
Public transport is limited, with a weekday workers bus from Toogoolawah to Ipswich operated by Translink, a shoppers bus operating on Thursdays by Coast and Country Coaches, and a daily bus, school days only, by Valley of the Lakes coaches. School buses operate to transport children to schools, and a VIP Transport operate a medical transport service.

== Environment ==
=== Flora ===
The Fernvale area was originally under dry eucalypt forest. Some fine specimens of Eucalyptus tereticornis remain. Acacia concurrens, Moreton Bay ash, Narrow-leaved ironbark and spotted gum are common, Callistemon viminalis abounds along the river banks.

== Fauna ==
The Brisbane River around Fernvale is home to a diverse fauna. including the Queensland lungfish, platypus, red-claw yabby and the freshwater mussel. Other common native animals include the echidna, koala, red-necked wallaby. The feral European fox is also common.

Common birds include corella, galah, Australian king parrot, pale-headed rosella, rainbow and scaly-breasted lorikeet, sulphur-crested cockatoo, glossy black cockatoo, blue-faced and scarlet honeyeater, noisy miner, Indian mynah, masked lapwing, wood duck, whistling ducks, wedge-tailed eagle, osprey, blue fairy wren, red-backed fairywren, double-barred finch, common-bronzewing pigeon, crested pigeon, rainbow bee-eater, channel-billed cuckoo (summer), koel (summer).
