= Ipswich North State School =

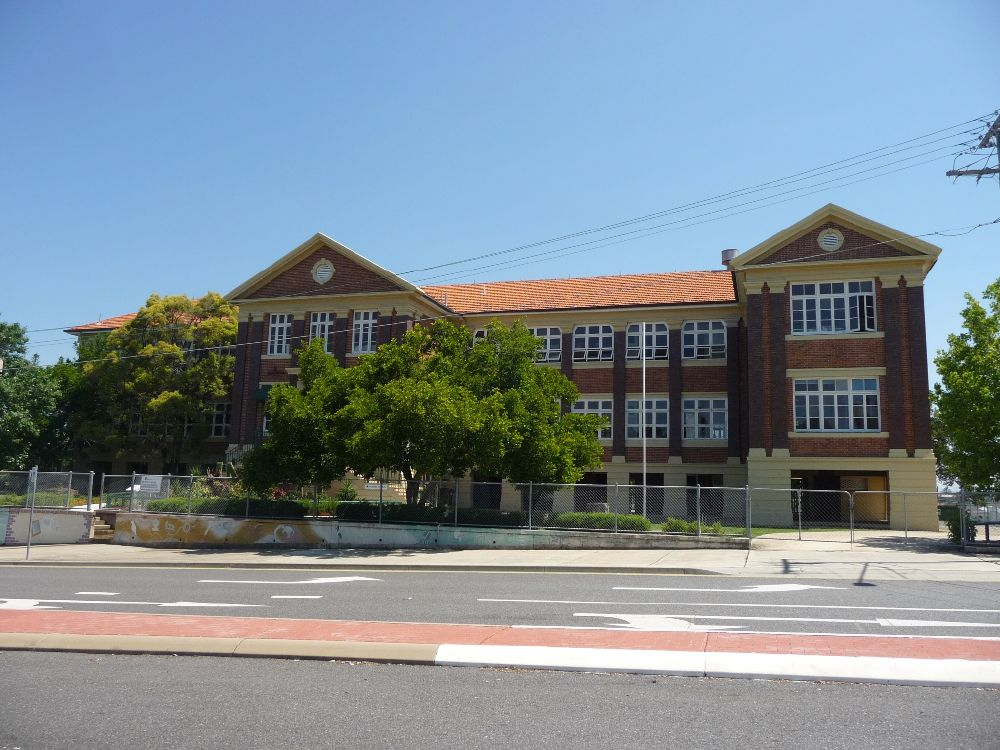
- Block A, looking SW from Fitzgibbon Street, 2015

- Location within Queensland
- 27.6025°S 152.7629°E
- Location: 9 Fitzgibbon Street, North Ipswich, City of Ipswich, Queensland, Australia

History
- Design period: 1919–1930s (Interwar period)
- Built: 1934–1937, 1934–1937

Site notes
- Architect: Frederick Thomas Jellet
- Architectural style: Classicism

Queensland Heritage Register
- Official name: Ipswich North State School
- Type: state heritage
- Designated: 5 February 2016
- Reference no.: 650021
- Type: Education, Research, Scientific Facility: School – state (primary)
- Theme: Educating Queenslanders: Providing primary schooling
- Builders: Queensland Department of Public Works

Ipswich North State School is a heritage-listed state school at 9 Fitzgibbon Street, North Ipswich, City of Ipswich, Queensland, Australia. It was designed by Frederick Thomas Jellet and built from 1934 to 1937 by Queensland Department of Public Works. It was formerly known as North Ipswich National School. It was added to the Queensland Heritage Register on 5 February 2016.

== History ==
Ipswich North State School, located east of Downs Street and south of Fitzgibbon Street in North Ipswich, opened in 1867 as North Ipswich National School, to accommodate the growing population of North Ipswich. In the mid-1870s the school was divided into a Boys School and a Girls and Infants School, which were reclassified as state schools c. 1876. In 1935 the two schools combined to form Ipswich North State School, housed within a Depression-era brick school building (constructed 1934, extended 1937). The school includes terraced grounds, retained by concrete walls which were built around the brick school building and its parade ground in 1934 and around the lower playground in 1937. The school has been in continuous operation since its establishment and has been a focus for the local community as a place for important social and cultural activity.

North Ipswich is an early suburb of the city of Ipswich, which was initially known as Limestone. After the penal settlement closed in 1839, and free settlement began from 1842, Limestone was renamed Ipswich, and developed as a river port for pastoralists on the Darling Downs. Ipswich became a municipality (the Borough of Ipswich) in 1860, and was proclaimed a part of the Port of Moreton Bay the same year.

North Ipswich's development accelerated from the early 1860s. The area north of Lawrence Street, around the later site of Ipswich North State School, was subdivided in 1864; by which time an immigration depot existed on the North Ipswich side of the Bremer River.

Many of the immigrants arriving at the North Ipswich depot were destined to work on Queensland's first railway, the Main Line railway. Construction of the Southern and Western Railway commenced with a ceremony in North Ipswich on 25 February 1864. The first section, to Grandchester, was opened in July 1865 and passed through the site of the present-day North Ipswich Railway Workshops.

The development of Ipswich and North Ipswich soon led to schools being established. In pre-separation Queensland, education was provided initially by fee-charging religious schools and private academies. They catered principally for children in the main population centres of Brisbane and Ipswich. A more organised approach to education commenced with New South Wales Governor Charles Fitzroy's appointment of a National Board of Education in 1848. The Board established and administered schools where parents contributed one-third of the building costs and guaranteed an average attendance of at least 30 pupils. Schools were opened in Warwick (1850), Drayton (1851) and Brisbane (1859). Following the separation of Queensland from New South Wales in late 1859, the Queensland Government introduced the Education Act 1860, which created a Board of General Education to oversee the development and administration of schools in the colony. The number of public or national schools increased from four in 1860 to 230 by 1875.

Two national schools, each sub-divided into separate schools for boys and girls, were established in Ipswich in the early 1860s: in Brisbane Street (Ipswich); and Omar Street (Little Ipswich State School, now West Ipswich State School). In 1864 these schools had a total average daily attendance of 201 and 103 pupils respectively, and by April 1865 there was a movement to establish a national school in North Ipswich, where a building had already been hired for teaching local children.

The establishment of schools was considered an essential step in the development of early communities and integral to their success. Schools became a community focus, a symbol of progress, and a source of pride, with enduring connections formed with past pupils, parents, and teachers.

At a meeting of local residents in the North Ipswich immigration depot in April 1865, a Mr Fitzgibbon moved that a primary school of the vested class be founded under the Board of General Education. Mr Hawthorne, of the Ipswich Grammar School (established 1863), stated that "seeing there had been such a large influx of population to North Ipswich on account of the important works [the railway] now going on, it was time a school was established".

The site of the National School (No.61) at North Ipswich, on an allotment of over 2 acres (0.81 ha) that was granted by the Government (the current site, east of Downs Street, and south of Fitzgibbon Street), was arranged in March 1867 by Randal Macdonnell, the Inspector General of Schools, and the school was later opened by Macdonnell on 1 July 1867. However, the school site was not officially gazetted until 1871, when 3 acres (1.2 ha) and 30 perches (760 m^{2}), was gazetted a Reserve for a National School.

The school originally operated from a timber building, divided into separate rooms for the boys and girls, which was "very pleasantly situated on an eminence commanding a fine view". The initial enrolment was 26 pupils, but this rose to an attendance of 90 by September 1867. In the 1860s North Ipswich was mostly thick bush, and pupils who rode to school kept their horses in a paddock fronting Lawrence Street.

The North Ipswich National School expanded and was reorganised in the 1870s. In the mid-1870s it was divided into the North Ipswich (or Ipswich North) Boys' School No.61, and the North Ipswich (or Ipswich North) Girls' and Infants' School No.246. In September 1875 the Girl's and Infant's school had 186 pupils enrolled and 141 pupils present, while the Boys School had 111 enrolled and 74 present. By June 1876 the Boys School was in its own building, while the Girls and Infants School had two buildings. The two schools became state schools, under the State Education Act 1875, which provided for free, compulsory and secular primary education and established the Department of Public Instruction.

Enrolment at the two schools reflected the continued development of North Ipswich. By the late 1870s, businesses in North Ipswich included a sawmill (Reilly), the Queensland Woollen Manufacturing Company (operational 1877, at the east end of The Terrace), and Ipswich Gas and Coke (operating from 8 The Terrace from 1878). The railway workshops also continued as a major employer. A brick Railway Store Building (now the Railway Historical Centre) was built in 1878–79, and in 1884 new railway workshops were built further north, two blocks northwest of the North Ipswich schools. In 1887 it was reported that North Ipswich was rapidly advancing, with new houses near the new workshops, plus a police station and barracks and a Post and Telegraph Office built within the preceding year.

The Boys School and Girls and Infants School at North Ipswich continued to expand from the 1880s, with additional buildings added to each. In 1907 a tender for a new teacher's residence was accepted, and in 2015 this was still located to the south of the school, fronting Lawrence Street.

Ipswich also continued to grow. It was declared a city in 1904, and by 1910 it had a population of 10,000. At this time there were 22 coal mines near Ipswich, including at Tivoli, north of North Ipswich. Businesses in North Ipswich by this time included Arthur Foote's joinery works, the Pommer Brothers' North Ipswich Ice and Butter factory (still extant, 9 The Terrace), and FE Barbat & Sons, Engineers. During World War I, the railway's workshops employed 1600 men.

By 1933 a decision was made to combine the boys, girls and infants schools into one new, multi-storey building. That year, the railway workshops had 1300 employees (down from 2400 "not long ago"), the Boys School had an enrolment of 231, and the Girls and Infants School had an enrolment of 293.

The new school building was a result of a Government initiative to boost employment. The Great Depression, commencing in 1929 and extending well into the 1930s, caused a dramatic reduction of building work in Queensland and brought private building work to a standstill. In response, the Queensland Government provided relief work for unemployed Queenslanders, and also embarked on an ambitious and important building programme to provide impetus to the economy.

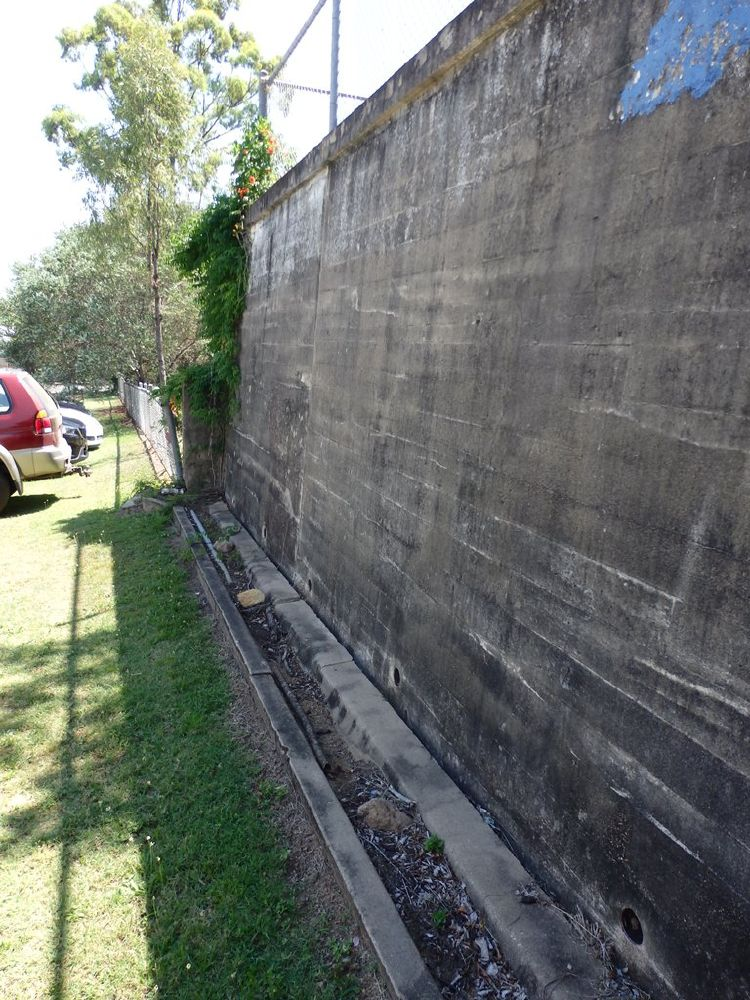
Lower playground eastern retaining wall, southern end, 2015

Even before the October 1929 stock market crash, the Queensland Government initiated an Unemployment Relief Scheme, through a work programme by the Department of Public Works (DPW). This included painting and repairs to school buildings. By mid-1930 men were undertaking grounds improvement works to schools under the scheme. Extensive funding was given for improvements to school grounds, including fencing and levelling ground for play areas, involving terracing and retaining walls. This work created many large school ovals, which prior to this period were mostly cleared of trees but not landscaped. These play areas became a standard inclusion within Queensland state schools and a characteristic element.

In June 1932 the Forgan Smith Labor Government came to power from a campaign that advocated increased government spending to counter the effects of the Depression. The government embarked on a large public works building programme designed to promote the employment of local skilled workers, the purchase of local building materials and the production of commodious, low maintenance buildings which would be a long-term asset to the state. This building programme included: government offices, schools and colleges; university buildings; court houses and police stations; hospitals and asylums; and gaols.

Many of the programmes have had lasting beneficial effects for the citizens of Queensland, including the construction of masonry brick school building s across the state. Most were designed in a classical idiom as this projects the sense of stability and optimism which the government sought to convey through the architecture of its public buildings.

The construction of substantial brick school building s (type E/B1) in prosperous or growing suburban areas and regional centres during the 1930s provided tangible proof of the government's commitment to remedy the unemployment situation. The Queensland DPW and Department of Public Instruction were extremely enthusiastic about the brick school building s designed in the 1930s. They were considered monuments to progress embodying the most modern principles of the ideal education environment.

Depression-era brick school building s form a recognisable and important type, exhibiting many common characteristics. Frequently, they were two storeys above an open undercroft and built to accommodate up to 1000 students. They adopted a symmetrical plan form and often exhibited a prominent central entry. The plan arrangement was similar to that of timber buildings, being only one classroom deep, accessed by a long straight verandah or corridor. Due to their long plan forms of multiple wings, they could be built in stages if necessary; resulting in some complete designs never being realised. Ideally, the classrooms would face south with the verandah on the north but little concession was made for this and almost all Depression-era brick school building s faced the primary boundary road, regardless of orientation. Classrooms were commonly divided by folding timber partitions and the undercroft was used as covered play space, storage, ablutions and other functions.

Despite their similarities, each Depression-era brick school building was individually designed by a DPW architect, which resulted in a wide range of styles and ornamental features being utilised within the overall set. These styles, which were derived from contemporary tastes and fashions, included: Arts and Crafts, typified by half-timbered gable-ends; Spanish Mission, with round-arched openings and decorative parapets; and Neo-classical, with pilasters, columns and large triangular pediments. Over time, variations occurred in building size, decorative treatment, and climatic-responsive features. The Chief Architect during this period was Andrew Baxter Leven (1885–1966), who was employed by the Queensland Government Works Department from 1910 to 1951, and was Chief Architect and Quantity Surveyor from 1933 to 1951. The drawings for the new school at North Ipswich (1933) are initialled F.T.J (drawn and traced), presumably Frederick Thomas Jellet, born in 1898, trained in Victoria and employed by the Queensland Department of Works as a temporary draftsman in the 1920s.

During 1934 the new brick school building at North Ipswich was constructed on the site of the old timber Girls and Infants school, facing Fitzgibbon Street. During the 1933–34 school holidays the northern wing of the latter was relocated to a site "between the main body of the girls school and the playshed", to be used for classes during construction of the new school.

By April 1934 work on the new building was well in hand. Concrete retaining walls, approved in November 1933 at a cost of £1768, were also nearly completed. It was stated by the Under Secretary of the Department of Public Works (G M Colledge) that the school would "be one of the most modern schools in Queensland, incorporating all the latest ideas for accommodation". It was also reported that "a considerable amount of relief work has been used in the preparation of the site". A foundation stone was laid on 8 June 1934, by Frank Cooper, the Secretary for Public Instruction.

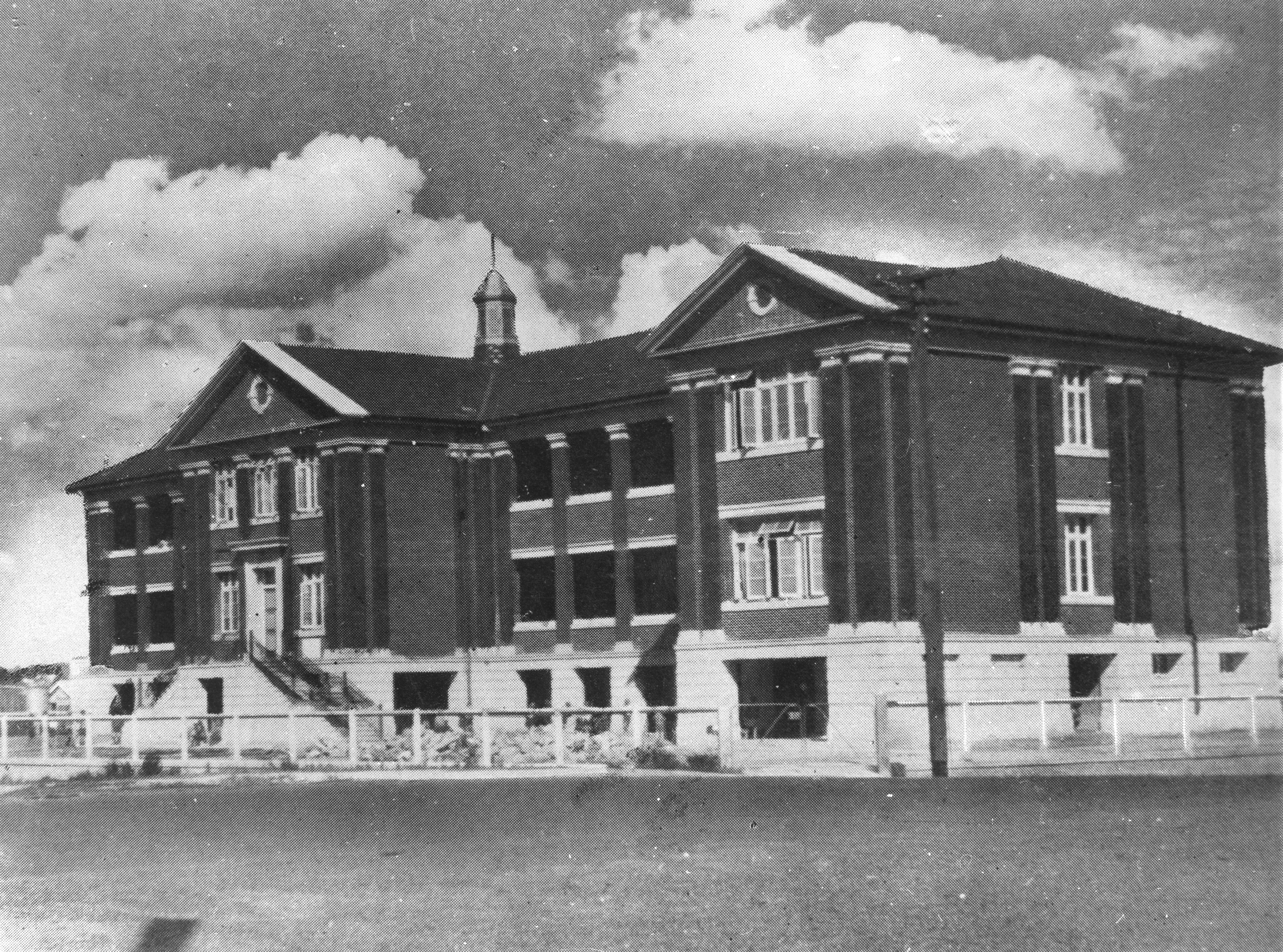
North Ipswich State School, Block A

The new building at Ipswich North State School had two storeys and an undercroft, was rectangular in shape and was designed in a Neo-classical style. It had an estimated cost of £12,900, and would accommodate 432 pupils in 11 classrooms, with possible extensions to accommodate up to 752 pupils. The roof was terracotta, with a prominent fleche, and a septic tank system was provided. Plans from November 1933 show that most of the undercroft was a play area, flanked by stairwells, lobbies and infants' lavatories, with one-storey lavatory blocks at each end (boys in the western block, girls in the eastern). The first floor had five classrooms, with cloakrooms and stairwells at each end, and a teachers' room and head teacher's office either side of the vestibule in the projecting entrance bay. The second floor had five classrooms between the cloakrooms and stairwells, with a teachers' room and sixth classroom in the projecting entrance bay. The centre three classrooms on each floor were separated with folding partitions rather than walls, and could become large assembly rooms. The plans show that the first and second floors had an open verandah running along the northern side of the classrooms.

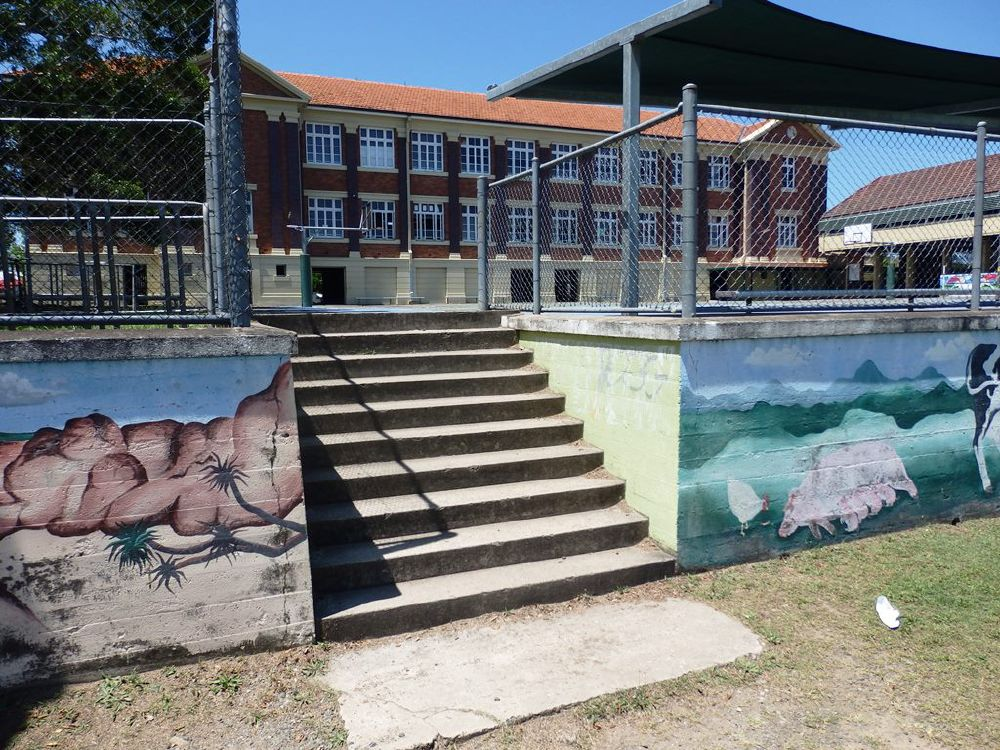
Retaining wall and steps, to the south-west of Block A, 2015

Concrete retaining walls and concrete surface drains surrounded the new building, creating a platform, with proposed tennis courts at the rear corners of the platform and stairs to the north, west and south.

The new brick school building was ready for use by the 1935 school year. The Boys School and Girls and Infants School both closed at the end of 1934, and moved into their new building on 29 January 1935. Ipswich North State was officially opened on 4 May 1935 by Frank Cooper.

However, there was still a need for further student accommodation. The second section of the school, to accommodate 160 pupils, was approved in August 1936. This had an estimated cost of £2388, and was added at the west end of the existing building by mid-1937. The addition, built above and to the north of the western lavatory block, consisted of two classrooms each on the first and second floors, and a play area (north of the lavatory block) on the ground floor. The new classrooms were separated by a continuation of the northern verandah of the main building. At this time the old wing from the Girls and Infants School, which had been used as a kindergarten, was moved to elsewhere on the grounds. Retaining walls, approved in August 1936 for £2136, were added around the lower playground and the school's tennis courts (located at the southern end of the school's grounds) c. 1936-7.

There were some minor changes to the school during the 1940s. In 1942, during World War II, air raid trenches were dug in the lower playground, and between the mid-1940s and mid-1950s the school committee grassed the oval and planted trees along Downs Street. The mature figs (Ficus sp.) along the eastern and western borders of the lower playground appear to date from this period. However, some trees extant today predate World War II, including the fig trees located just south of the west end of the brick school building, and one fig tree at the south end of the school, just north of the residence.

By 1947 the railways workshops in North Ipswich employed almost 3000 people, and Ipswich North State School continued to expand in the 1950s. The northern verandahs of the brick school building were enclosed with groups of nine awning windows after 1951; a ventilation shaft was installed from the infant boys' lavatory to the roof, through the cloakrooms, in 1952; and a room (probably the front classroom on the second floor) was converted into a library in 1955. A new two-storey brick and metal wing with two classrooms above a play area (Block B in 2015) was added to the rear of the eastern end of the brick school building (Block A in 2015) in 1957. This was completed in January 1958, and was opened 27 August 1958.

After 1958 the school grounds also expanded, beginning with land acquired southeast of Block B by 1969. Land was also obtained in 1973, fronting Fitzgibbon Street to the east of the school. By 1974 the grounds covered 2.7 hectares (6.7 acres), including land east of the school residence on Lawrence Street, and land fronting Pine Street; and by 1977 the school covered 2.9 hectares (7.2 acres), with additional Pine Street frontage.

Although the school grounds expanded, local employment was shrinking. The functions of the railway workshops were progressively moved to Redbank between 1965 and 1995, and the school's enrolment declined over this period, falling from 600 in 1967 to 275 in 1989.

However, changes continued at the school. A memorial archway and plaque was erected at the corner of Downs and Fitzgibbon Streets for the school's 1967 centenary. In 1971 a typists' room and staff room were established, in the projecting entrance bay of the first and second floors respectively; and in 1977 the two first floor classrooms of the 1937 extension became a library and storytelling room, with the joinery removed from door and window openings onto the verandah and window openings enlarged to the floor. By this time there was a work room and store in the former western cloak room of the first floor, and a "work and storeroom" in the former eastern cloakroom.

By 1991 a tuckshop and storeroom existed on the ground level of the projecting entrance bay; and by 2000 the classrooms on the first and second floors of the 1934 section had been reconfigured to form three classrooms, instead of five, on each floor. There were also storerooms in the former cloakrooms of the second floor, and a "teacher aid" area in the former eastern cloakroom of the first floor. The projecting entrance bay on the second floor contained a staff room in the original classroom, and a health room in the original teachers' room.

A school dental clinic opened to the east of the original school reserve, on Fitzgibbon Street, in 1978, and a preschool building was constructed fronting Pine Street in 1991. Other modern additions to the school have included covered play areas and Special Education buildings. A war memorial, consisting of a sandstone boulder and flagpole, was built between Block A and Fitzgibbon Street in 2004.

The school grounds have contracted in size since 2000. Land was sold on Pine Street in 2003, reducing the school size to 2.6 hectares (6.4 acres), and the tennis courts and the 1907 residence on Lawrence Street were sold in 2014. The school grounds now cover 2.3 hectares (5.7 acres).

In 2015, the school continues to operate from its original site. It retains its Depression-era brick school building and retaining walls dating from the 1930s, with terraced grounds and mature trees. The school is important as a focus for the surrounding community and generations of students from the area have been taught there. Sunday markets are held on the school's lower playground. Enrolment in 2012 was 126; rising to 215 in 2014.

== Description ==
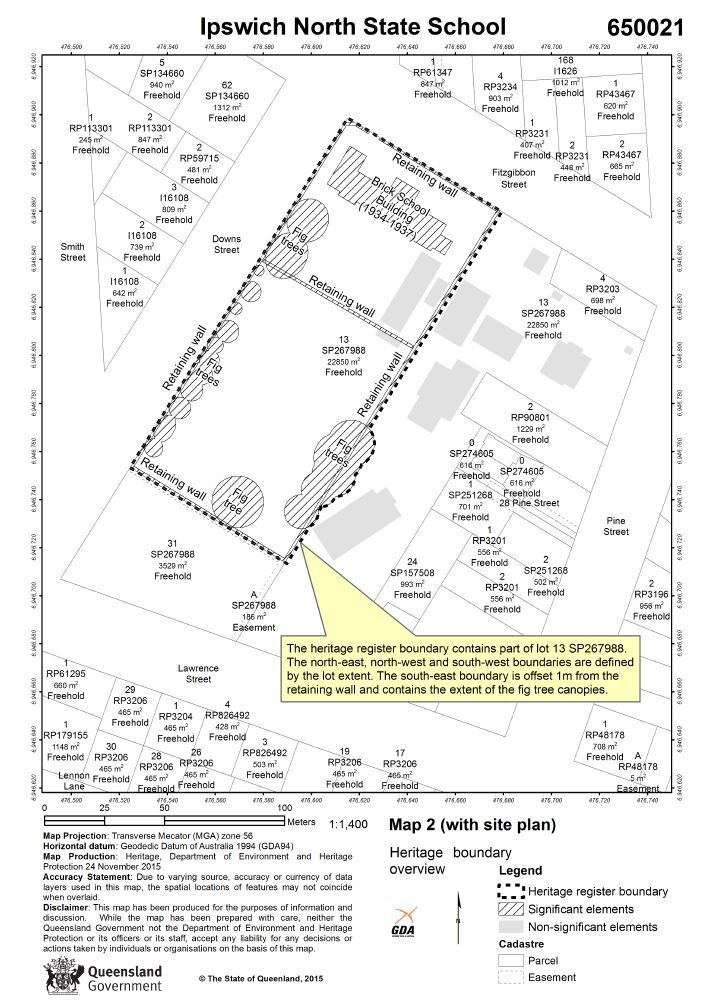
Site map, 2016

Ipswich North State School occupies a prominent site located in the predominantly residential suburb of North Ipswich. The school is bounded by Fitzgibbon Street to the north, Downs Street to the west, the former school residence and tennis courts to the south, and residences along Pine Street to the east. The heritage register boundary encompasses the western portion of the allotment (1.32 hectares (3.3 acres)); an area consistent with the 1871 school reserve and defined by two level rectangular platforms surrounded by concrete retaining walls (1934–37). Facing Fitzgibbon Street, the prominent Depression-era brick school building (Block A, 1934–37) is situated on the northern platform and makes an important visual contribution to the streetscape, and is a landmark for the area. The southern (lower) platform comprises a large playing field with perimeter shade trees.

=== Brick school building (Block A) ===
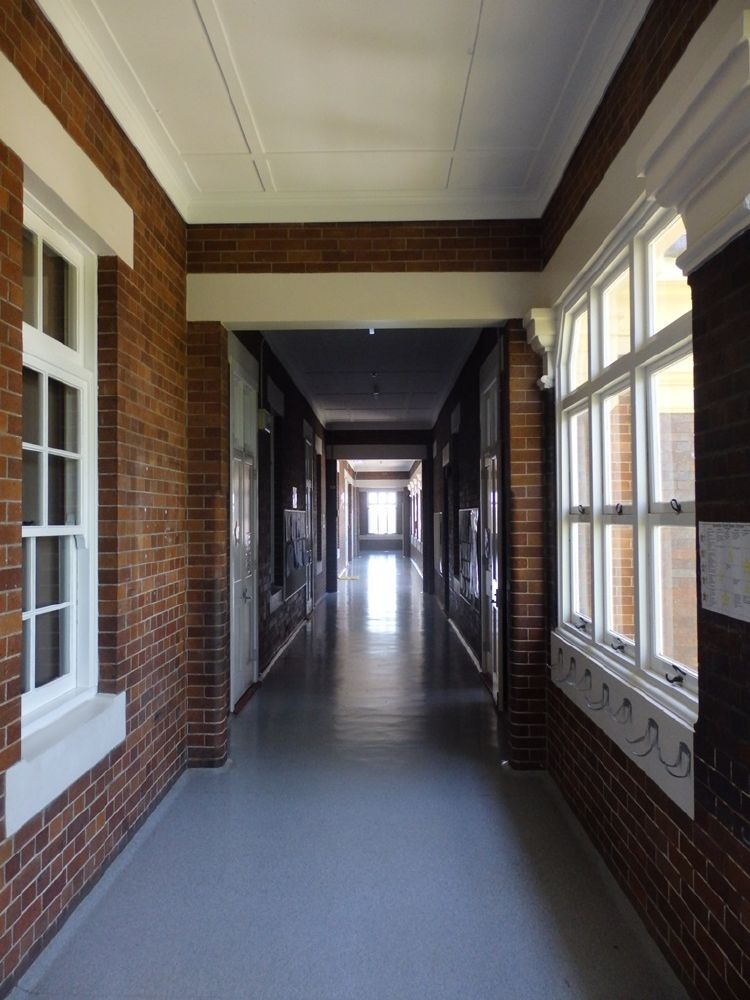
2nd floor verandah, Block A, looking north-west, 2015

Block A is a substantial, classically detailed, two-storey masonry structure, with an undercroft. The building is L-shaped in plan and comprises three sections: a symmetrically arranged range (1934) with projecting entrance bay to the front (north) elevation; a single storey extension to the east (1934); and a double storey wing, with undercroft, to the west (1937) that projects from the front elevation. The hipped roof is clad with terracotta tiles. A modern wing (Block B) is connected to the southeast of Block A and is not of heritage significance.

The building is elegantly composed, with load-bearing face brick walls and rendered decorative elements to the first and second floors; and a rendered base finished to resemble channel-jointed ashlar. The face brick is primarily red and has contrasting pilasters of a dark brown brick, which have simple, rendered capitals. The projecting entrance bay features a gabled pediment over a central first floor doorway, which has a rendered aedicule and is accessed from a landing flanked by stairs. The pediment is supported by pilasters and a circular accent vent with rendered surround is centred on the face brick tympanum. The projecting gabled wing to the northwest features similar classical detailing but is narrower and without external stairs; as are the two pedimented bays that frame the south elevation of the range.

The interior layout of the central range is symmetrical, with face brick stairwells at the east and west ends flanked by enclosed landings (former hat rooms) that are used for storage and offices. Verandahs (enclosed c. 1952) on the northern side access the first and second floor classrooms. There are three (formerly five) classrooms to the first and second floors, with modern concertina doors inserted to form a narrow utility space with sink on each floor. The classrooms have plaster walls with picture rails, timber-framed floors covered with modern carpet, and flat sheeted ceilings with timber battens. The classrooms retain original partition bulkheads and latticed ceiling vents, which indicate the original layout. The projecting entrance bay has a central hallway flanked by reception and a sick room to the first floor, and a teachers' room and computer-server room to the second floor. The first and second floors of the western wing have two rooms each separated by a central hallway that is a continuation of the verandah. A vertical vent (1952) is retained in the office adjacent to the western stairwell, on the second floor.

The building retains much of its original timber-framed joinery. Windows to external walls are predominately banks of tall narrow-sash casements with fanlights, set between the face brick pilasters. Windows to the face brick verandah walls are double-hung sashes with fanlights and concrete sills. Classroom doors are low-waisted panelled timber with fanlights. Joinery has been removed to form openings in the face brick walls to the first floor hallway in the west wing. The verandahs have been enclosed with banks of awning windows. The verandah floors are concrete, covered with modern vinyl. Early sinks are retained at the eastern end of the verandahs.

The undercroft level has a perimeter of rendered piers and walls and is primarily open play-space. The central piers are face brick that have been painted with bright colours and murals. Bathrooms are located at the east and west ends. They retain original layouts and v-jointed (VJ) timber lined partitions. The floor is concrete and the area under the western wing has outlines for hopscotch and other games inscribed into the slab. Timber bench seats are situated between the perimeter piers.

=== Landscape Elements ===
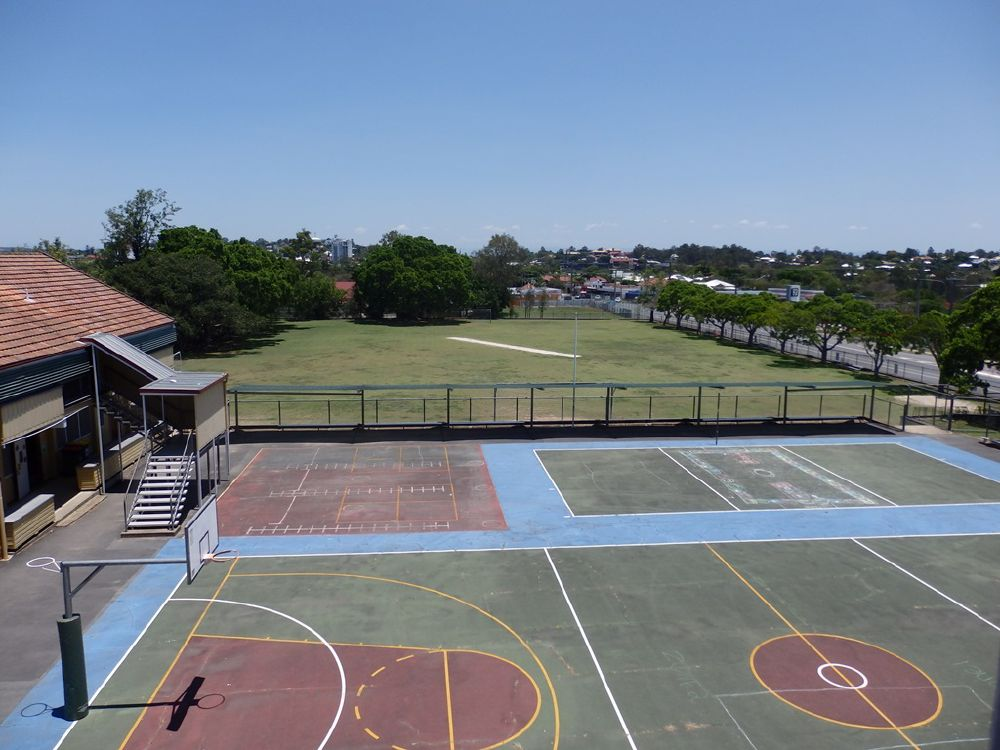
View of grounds looking south-westfrom east classroom, 2nd floor, Block A, 2015

The school grounds are well established and the sloping site has been terraced to form two level platforms with school buildings and a parade ground to the north, and sporting facilities on the lower platform to the south. Both platforms are surrounded by Depression-era concrete retaining walls with concrete surface drains and silt pits.

The northern platform (1934) is roughly square in plan and features a centenary memorial entrance gate (1967) on the corner, at the intersection of Downs and Fitzgibbon Streets. Concrete stairs, centred on the northern and western retaining walls, also provide access from the street. Block A is prominently sited on the platform, set back from Fitzgibbon Street behind a symmetrically arranged landscaped area with garden beds and a semicircular concrete pathway. A parade ground to the south of the building has a bitumen surface with line markings for a basketball court. A row mature fig trees (Ficus sp.) is situated in a grassed area to the west of the parade ground. Concrete stairs punctuate the retaining wall between the north and south platforms, which is painted with murals.

The level playing field on the southern platform has a cricket pitch to the centre and shade trees to the perimeter. There is a row of mature figs on the eastern side, figs and a silky oak (Grevillea robusta) to the west, and a mature fig to the south. Concrete stairs in the southern retaining wall (1937) provide access to the former tennis courts below.

The school is sited on a rise, and the elevated position and terraced nature of the site affords opportunities for views to and from the surrounding area. The substantial-sized Block A is a prominent feature of the streetscape and is a landmark for the area.

== Heritage listing ==
Ipswich North State School was listed on the Queensland Heritage Register on 5 February 2016 having satisfied the following criteria.

The place is important in demonstrating the evolution or pattern of Queensland's history.

Ipswich North State School (established in 1867 as North Ipswich National School) is important in demonstrating the evolution of state education and its associated architecture in Queensland. The place retains an excellent example of a government designed Depression-era brick school building (built 1934, extended 1937), which was an architectural response to prevailing government educational philosophies; set in landscaped grounds with retaining walls (1934–37) and mature trees.

The Depression-era brick school building and landscaping of the school grounds are the result of the State Government's building and relief work programmes during the 1930s that stimulated the economy and provided work for men unemployed as a result of the Great Depression

Ipswich North State School is also a result of the population growth of North Ipswich, which was the site of Queensland's first and principal railway workshops (1864–1995), employing thousands of people. North Ipswich has the most imposing state school building in Ipswich, reflecting the past importance of the suburb.

The place is important in demonstrating the principal characteristics of a particular class of cultural places.

Ipswich North State School is important in demonstrating the principal characteristics of a Queensland state school built during the Depression era. The school comprises a brick school building constructed to a government design and a landscaped site that retains Depression-era retaining walls, assembly and play areas, a playing field with cricket pitch, and mature trees.

The substantial Depression-era brick school building is a highly-intact, excellent example of its type and retains a high degree of integrity. The principal characteristics it demonstrates include: its two-storey form, with an undercroft; face brick exterior; high-quality design with classical influence and detailing; central range symmetrically arranged around a projecting entrance bay; and terracotta-tiled hipped roof. The building has a linear layout, with rooms accessed by verandahs, and an open play space and toilet facilities in the undercroft.

The place is important because of its aesthetic significance.

Through its substantial size, high quality materials, face brick exterior, elegant formal composition and decorative treatment, the Depression-era brick school building at Ipswich North State School has aesthetic significance due to its expressive attributes, which evoke the sense of progress and permanence that the Queensland Government sought to embody in new public buildings in that era.

The building's assertive massing, classically influenced design, and elegant composition contribute to its dignified streetscape presence, and contrast with the surrounding small-scale residences and commercial premises. Prominently sited and set within terraced grounds comprising two level platforms articulated by Depression-era concrete retaining walls, the building is a landmark for the area.

The place has a strong or special association with a particular community or cultural group for social, cultural or spiritual reasons.

Schools have always played an important part in Queensland communities. They typically retain significant and enduring connections with former pupils, parents, and teachers; provide a venue for social interaction and volunteer work; and are a source of pride, symbolising local progress and aspirations.

Ipswich North State School has a strong and ongoing association with the North Ipswich community. It was established in 1867 through the fundraising efforts of the local community and generations of North Ipswich children have been taught there. The place is important for its contribution to the educational development of North Ipswich and is a prominent community focal point and gathering place for social and commemorative events with widespread community support.

== See also ==
- History of state education in Queensland
- List of schools in Greater Brisbane
