= Queensland Woollen Manufacturing Company mill =

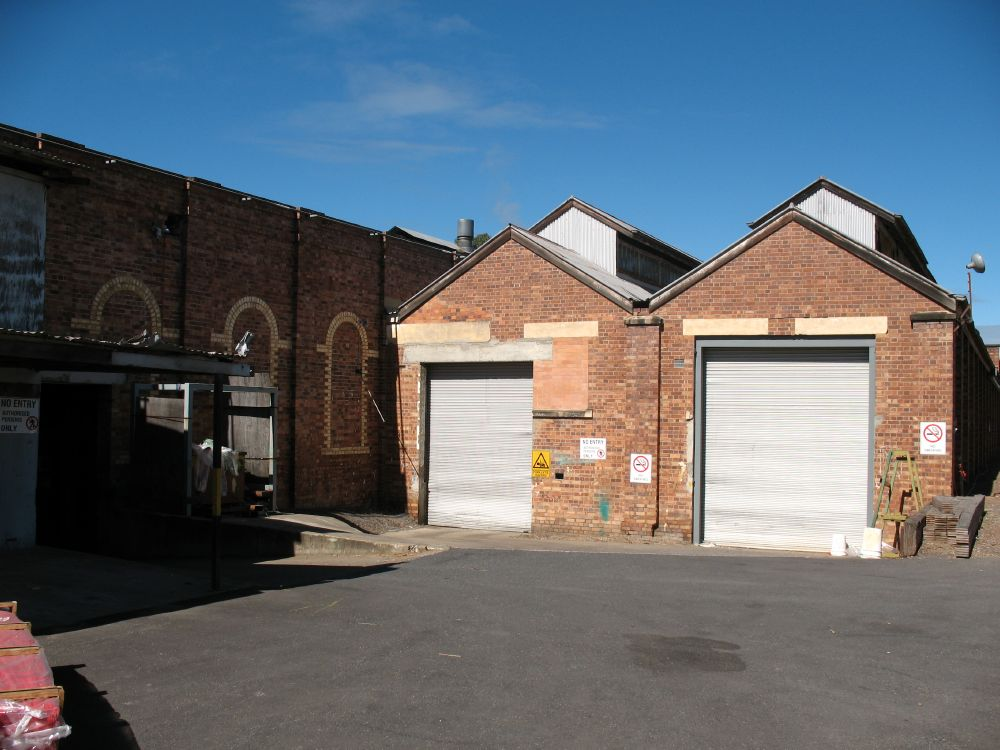
- Queensland Woollen Manufacturing Company mill, 2009

- Location within Queensland Location within Australia
- 27.6107°S 152.766°E
- Location: 42 & 42B The Terrace, North Ipswich, City of Ipswich, Queensland, Australia

Queensland Heritage Register
- Official name: Queensland Woollen Manufacturing Company Ltd (former), Australian Fabric Manufacturers Ltd, Boral Hancock Plywood
- Type: state heritage (built)
- Designated: 19 September 2008
- Reference no.: 602572
- Significant period: 1870s onwards

Queensland Woollen Manufacturing Company mill is a heritage-listed mill at 42 & 42B The Terrace, North Ipswich, City of Ipswich, Queensland, Australia. It is also known as Australian Fabric Manufacturers Ltd and Boral Hancock Plywood. It was added to the Queensland Heritage Register on 19 September 2008.

== History ==
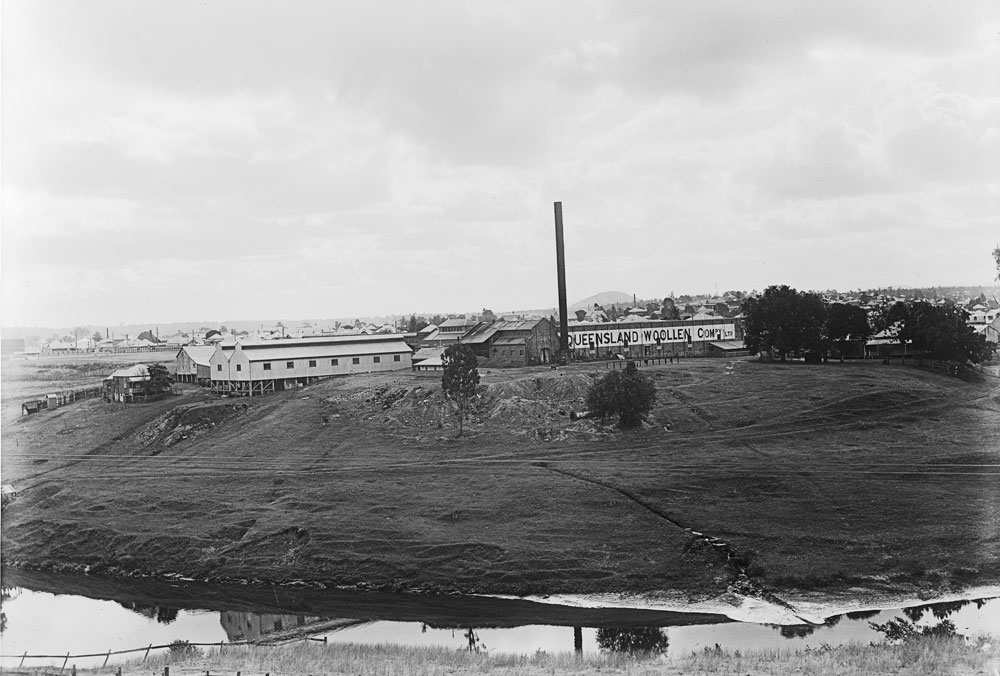
Queensland Woollen Manufacturing Company mill, circa 1920

The Queensland Woollen Manufacturing Company is situated in North Ipswich on level land overlooking the Bremer River. It was established in 1875 and the factory was the first woollen manufacturing plant in Queensland.

Ipswich commenced as a convict outstation known as "Limestone" in 1827. After free settlement began in 1842, the township developed as an important commercial centre because of its location at the head of navigation of the Brisbane and Bremer Rivers and at the junction of routes to the Brisbane Valley and the Darling Downs. Goods from these regions were channelled through Ipswich en route to the coast and this trade contributed significantly to Ipswich's rapid growth and prosperity. By 1875 an efficient railway had been constructed in Ipswich, increasing Ipswich's value as a commercial centre in Queensland.

In 1875 The Queensland Woollen Manufacturing Company established a woollen mill in Ipswich due to the existence of an efficient wool delivery system. The company bought 7.25 acres (2.93 ha) and 17 perches (430 m^{2}) of land at the bend of the north bank of the Bremer River. The position of the mill was imperative to its future success; the mill was built meters from "The Basin" on the Bremer River. "The Basin" is a man-made bight in the Bremer River to allow large ships to turn around. This facilitated the loading and unloading process of shipped goods. Being situated beside the river, the mill had a reliable water source for its steam engines. The railway was also close by.

The timber factory was built and production of woollen tweed commenced in 1877. To highlight the importance of the mill for Queensland at that time the factory was officially opened in 1877 by the Governor of Queensland, Sir Arthur Kennedy.

Queensland's manufacturing and industrial base were expanding at this time; the woollen industry was at the forefront of this. The pastoral sector of the industry was succeeding and more and more land in Australia was opened up and utilised by sheep graziers. Larger numbers of sheep were grazing, successful breeding programs were ensuring better quality wool, and ovine diseases were being eradicated due to strict quarantine measures and improved veterinarian and environmental knowledge by farmers.

The establishment of the woollen mill in Ipswich provided a centrally located processing plant for the raw wool produced on the Darling Downs. Prior to the building of the woollen mill the raw wool was sent for processing to Melbourne, Sydney or Adelaide (all of which already had well-established wool processing plants), but this was costly and inefficient. The Ipswich mill allowed raw wool to be processed locally, benefiting the Darling Downs' sheep graziers. It was also an important indicator that the Queensland economy was developing beyond the supply of raw materials, and vertical integration was occurring, in this case for the sheep industry.

In an effort to encourage successful industry in Queensland, the Government offered the Queensland Woollen Manufacturing Company a bonus of £1,000 for the first 1,000 yards (910 m) of cloth produced. The mill initially produced only unfinished cloth, this, however, changed as a lack of demand for unfinished cloth forced the company into establishing its own clothing works.

The Queensland Woollen Manufacturing Company produced good quality wool products. Tweeds, flannels, worsteds, blankets, rugs, and apparel were the advertised products of the factory. In an advertisement in the Queensland Times from 1879, the directors of the company advertised the purity of their cloths, "they are manufactured from Queensland Merino Wool. Free from shoddy mixtures of cloths gathered from prisons, hospitals, lunatic and other asylums". Many woollen manufacturers in this period followed a practice known as using "shoddy". This entailed pulling apart and recycling discarded woollen products such as knitted goods which would then be woven with newly spun wool. There was a demand for this product as it was inexpensive, but The Queensland Woollen Manufacturing Company did not want to be associated with such a means of woollen production, as their advertisement suggests.

In 1881 additions were made to the mill. These were designed by influential Ipswich architect and businessman, Samuel Shenton, who was at the time a director of the mill - a position he held for many years (1875 to 1891). He was also Ipswich mayor for several years (1871, 1872 and 1889). It was not only Shenton who was involved with the mill, as other prominent business and political leaders in Ipswich played a large role in the direction of the mill including several Ipswich mayors. The Queensland Woollen Manufacturing Company was regarded by many of the most prominent members of Ipswich as an important industry to be associated with, as well as a sound financial investment.

By 1887 The Queensland Woollen Manufacturing Company was mentioned in the official Tender for Public Service to the Queensland Government. An entry in the Queensland Government Gazette dated 20 January 1887, stated the supply of serge, tweed, blankets and rugs was to be supplied by The Queensland Woollen Manufacturing Company at an annual fee of £600 for the requested amount of goods. In a subsequent letter from the mill's management to the Government, it was stated the products that the Government would receive from the mill would be of a far higher quality than those that they received previously from other manufacturers. This may be a reflection on the poor quality of wool products available to many Queenslanders prior to the establishment of The Queensland Woollen Manufacturing Company.

In 1890, the wooden factory was replaced by spacious brick and iron buildings. These buildings were designed by eminent Ipswich architect, George Brockwell Gill. Gill designed many of the grand residences and public buildings in Ipswich from the 1880s to the 1930s. Some of his works include Ipswich Girls' Grammar School, "Brynhyfryd" for Lewis Thomas, St Paul's Rectory, Ipswich Club House, the Ipswich Technical College, and supervision of the construction of the Walter Burley Griffin Incinerator in 1936.

The newly built brick factory was a very large addition to the North Ipswich landscape. In early photographs, the mill dominates The Terrace beside the Bremer River. The high west wall was built with arched, light brick "built-in" window facades that ran down the length of the side of the building to create an attractive feature in the brickwork. A tall, brick, industrial chimney rose from the south east corner of the mill. Within the tall walls, various types of industrial equipment processed the wool. The mill was designed to admit maximum possible daylight and ventilation inside the building, before the use of electric light. To do this, large panelled windows were included within the vertical segment of the sawtooth roof. Along the east, west, and south walls large windows were built in.

Within the woollen mill buildings, the wool was cleaned, spun, and woven on large industrial machines into various forms of cloth. Much of this was then manufactured as garments such as shirts, trousers and suits. The unfinished fabric was also sold. These machines were steam-driven. The mill had its own steam engines and boiler for power generation. The steam engine was located beside the large brick chimney in the south-east corner of the mill. The machines were secured to great wooden supporting beams that ran below the ceiling.

The wool processing within the mill consisted of various stages: sorting and grading, scouring, drying and dying, carding, combing, spinning, weaving, brushing, and sewing. Each stage was carried out in a separate area of the mill, with each process flowing onto the next in a hierarchical structure; this was a design feature to facilitate efficiency in the mill. In the two smaller south rooms the wool was sorted and graded to determine how it would be processed; the scouring vats were located in the south-west room, and here the wool was cleaned of impurities and steam dried and dyed if required. The remainder of the process was carried out in the main area of the mill. The mill contained ten carding machines; these large machines broke up the wool and removed impurities. The combing process further organised the woollen fibres. The largest machines in the mill were the spinning mules on which the wool was spun. The wool was then woven into fabrics on the weaving looms. The woven fabric then went through shaving machines to give the cloth a fine finish. Finally, the fabric would be sewn into various products.

By the end of the nineteenth century, Ipswich was experiencing a boom in industry, employment, and wealth. Major manufacturing and industrial plants such as the North Ipswich Railway Workshops), coal mines, Australia's first cotton mill, and Ipswich Town Wharves were major contributors to this success. By 1891 Ipswich's population had reached 13,059, making it the fourth largest town in Queensland at that time.

Whilst most industries in Ipswich provided employment opportunities for adult males, the cloth industry employed hundreds of women. The largest single employer of female labour in Ipswich was The Queensland Woollen Manufacturing Company; in 1891 the firm employed 152 women of a total of 226 employees.

Those living in Ipswich at this time patronised local industry; the flannel made by The Queensland Woollen Manufacturing Company was a favourite cloth used by the women for making work clothes for men. The garments made within the mill were also popular with the industrial workers and miners in Ipswich. Known as "Ipswich Grey Flannels", these were woollen shirts and a standard item of dress for Ipswich men. The woollen mill held a contract with Queensland Railways for the supply of serge for their employee uniforms, as well as with the Queensland Police for the manufacture of serge uniforms.

The Queensland Woollen Manufacturing Company played an important role in the war effort during the First World War. Many of the industries in Ipswich suffered during the war due to reduced numbers of employees and minimised profits, but the Queensland Woollen Manufacturing Company was an exception; the high number of female employees ensured minimal staff reductions caused by the war. The factory was extremely busy throughout the war making army blankets and cloth for military uniforms.

By 1919, as a reflection of the success of the woollen mill in North Ipswich, it was the very first factory to have electric light installed. This meant that the mill could remain productive for longer each day, thus increasing productivity and ultimate profits, as well as benefiting the employees. 80% of the mills' products were sold in Queensland. The flannels and blankets, named Ipswich Flannel and Poinsettia Blankets, were renowned throughout Australia for their high quality.

During the 1930s Depression, the woollen mill was still in production, acting as an important employer at a time of extreme unemployment throughout much of the world. A reflection of this can be seen in an advertisement in The Queensland Times from 1935 when Australia was still feeling the effects of financial recession. The advertisement claimed the Queensland Woollen Manufacturing Company was tripling its output; the directors had decided to sell the garments at a lower price for the benefit of the consumer. Special lines included coat and trousers, and full suits, worsted suits, either custom made or ready-made. It was claimed the customer was purchasing "Pure Wool and No Rubbish". Statistics reveal the cloth and clothing manufacturing industry in Queensland actually increased its employment numbers over the Depression years rather than being forced to decrease them as so many other industries had to do.

The Second World War saw the woollen mill playing a similar role to that of the First, making blankets and cloth for the armed services. During the war years, the Federal Government declared dismissals forbidden from vital or "protected industries" such as the cloth manufacturing industry; prices and wages were pegged. For the workers, this was a favourable climate to demand improvements. A larger number of females were employed in the mill during the war due to decreased male employment.

Ipswich was an important centre for the union movement in this period, especially in the several textile mills scattered in the area. The Queensland Woollen Manufacturing Company was involved in this movement. In 1942 employee displeasure brimmed over into a major worker's strike in the woollen mill. To strike in the midst of a world war that enveloped all Australia was not seen in a favourable light by the general public, and the media sentiment at the time regarding the strike at the Queensland Woollen Manufacturing Company reflects this; rhetoric such as "War work held up" and "a most unfortunate stoppage in the supplies for the army" was used. The Queensland Woollen Manufacturing Company continued to have industrial disputes in 1943 and 1945.

Many of the windows in the building were changed in the mid-twentieth century from timber-framed sash windows to louvers. The Queensland Woollen Manufacturing Company was still in production up until 1968 when the company changed hands to the Australian Fabric Manufacturers Ltd. Further construction was undertaken with modern steel-framed buildings designed for wool scouring being erected in the 1970s or early 1980s. In 1984 Hancock Bros Pty Ltd purchased the older part of the woollen mills, designating it "the top mill" and the newest parts of the mill complex were purchased first by Prunda Pty Ltd and then Terrace Furniture.

The industrial machinery once used within the mill has long been removed. The factory now produces plywood and the machinery used for this production is vastly different to that once used for woollen cloth manufacture. The steam engine was removed to the North Ipswich Railway Workshops Museum (North Ipswich Railway Workshops) when the mill was taken over by the plywood company. The manager's house, once situated north-east of the site, was recently moved to the Mining Museum at Kholo for display as "The Queenslander". The mill is now manufacturing plywood for Boral Hancocks. The chimney was removed by the Boral Hancock Company as it had become unstable and unsafe.

== Description ==
The buildings are situated above the northern bank of the Bremer River within a large industrial area that follows the river down a slight hill. Called "the Top Mill" by the current occupiers, the former buildings of The Queensland Woollen Manufacturing Company are situated on the highest part of the industrial area.

The mill is a large, high walled, rectangular brick building with several extensions and subsidiary buildings added, adjoining the main building.

The main entrance to the mill lies to the north-west and is accessible from the corner of Lamington Parade and The Terrace. The wrought iron entrance gates display The Queensland Woollen Manufacturing Company insignia. The brick wall adjacent to The Terrace has been painted and is a substantial feature in the streetscape of this small industrial area.

To the left of the entrance is the main mill building. This structure is a large rectangular building constructed of light red common bricks laid in English bond. It has a sawtooth roof of sixteen sections. On the western side of the main mill building the wall is exposed and four inlaid brick features in cream brick made to resemble arched windows.

Two smaller, single-story, brick extensions have been added to the west wall of the main mill, and lead into the main building internally. These buildings have corrugated iron roofs and clerestory windows. These two buildings are aligned north–south, in contrast to the rest of the factory that is east–west.

There is evidence of the demolished brick chimney on the south-east corner of the mill. There is a remaining furnace at the base of the chimney; this has been bricked up and is inaccessible due to the storage of plywood surrounding it. There are concrete blocks on which machinery was mounted outside of the steam room. The brick exterior walls contain rows of large sash windows. On the eastern wall, these windows have been built approximately three meters off the ground. They now contain glass louvers. On the north and south walls, the windows are placed closer to the ground, approximately one meter from the ground; these windows were once timber framed sash windows but are now either louvers or have been bordered up by timber panels.

The interior of the factory is made up of a large open area with several smaller rooms leading from it. The walls throughout are painted brick. Internally, the spaces lead into one another.

The main part of the mill is a large open hall, formerly housing machinery. Timber trusses support the roof, which is unlined. In places, the timber beams have been replaced by steel. The floor is concrete.

In the south-east corner room, a boiler and industrial steam engine were once housed here and were used to power the factory's machines. The large brick chimney and furnace were situated next to this boiler room in the south-east corner of the factory. The roof in this room is high to accommodate the steam power machinery.

Beside this room was the wool grading room. Originally it had a timber floor, raised one meter from the existing cement floor. The room is now used as a storage room by the plywood company.

Beside this room to the west was the scouring room. Initially, this room contained large cast-iron vats for the scouring process. These were sunk into the floor and were two meters in-depth, but have been floored over with cement.

The factory offices still remain intact at the north-east corner of the main factory building. Within these brick offices is an original walk-in safe with original iron frame. The walls are plastered. The plastered ceiling of the first office has a small vent; this has a wrought iron cover displaying The Queensland Woollen Manufacturing Company's insignia. Above all the interior doors in the office are louvered panelled windows.

== Heritage listing ==
The former Queensland Woollen Manufacturing Company mill was listed on the Queensland Heritage Register on 19 September 2008 having satisfied the following criteria.

The place is important in demonstrating the evolution or pattern of Queensland's history.

As the first woollen mill in Queensland, and an early example of large scale manufacturing, the mill played an important role in the development of the Queensland textile industry and is important in illustrating early vertical integration for the sheep industry in Queensland.

The textile industry was traditionally a major employer of women and The Queensland Woollen Manufacturing Company continued this tradition as it was the largest employer of women in Ipswich in the late nineteenth and early twentieth centuries.

The mill's placement in Ipswich demonstrates the importance of Ipswich as a trading centre, receiving raw wool from the Darling Downs and passing the manufactured product on to Brisbane for distribution.

As a producer of uniform fabric and blankets for the armed forces in both the First and Second World Wars, The Queensland Woollen Manufacturing Company made an important contribution to Australia's war effort. It has also been important as a supplier of Railway and Police uniforms.

The place demonstrates rare, uncommon or endangered aspects of Queensland's cultural heritage.

The practice of woollen manufacturing in major textile centres such as Northern England was to have key processes carried out in separate manufactories. The Queensland Woollen Manufacturing Company is the first manufactory of its type in Queensland which processed the fibre from raw wool to textiles and garments. The Queensland Woollen Manufacturing Company is rare as it was the first woollen mill in Queensland.

The place is important in demonstrating the principal characteristics of a particular class of cultural places.

The Queensland Woollen Manufacturing Company is important as an early and substantially intact example of a woollen mill in Queensland. The mill is sitting on the bank of a river for both transport and water for steam-driven machinery, and its layout provides evidence of its operations. Within the mill are components that allow the reading of the hierarchical movement that occurred within the plant; the large steam engine room with furnace, the wool grading room, the scouring, drying and dying room, the large open halls in which the carding machines, spinning mules, weaving looms, shaving machines were once held, the sewing area and storage rooms all follow a purpose-designed floor plan that was not changed for the duration of the woollen mill's existence.

The mill is an example of the work by prominent Ipswich architect George Brockwell Gill. Other notable work by Gill includes the Ipswich Girls' Grammar School, the Ipswich Technical College, the Ipswich Club House, the Hotel Metropole, and "Brynhyfryd" House.

The place is important because of its aesthetic significance.

Built on the elevated corner of a bend in the Bremer River the large brick exterior walls of the mill are a landmark in North Ipswich and have been since the brick structure was built in 1890. Due to the mill's distinctive size, setting and compositional qualities it is clearly visible from many areas around Ipswich.
