= Hotel Cecil, North Ipswich =

Hotel Cecil
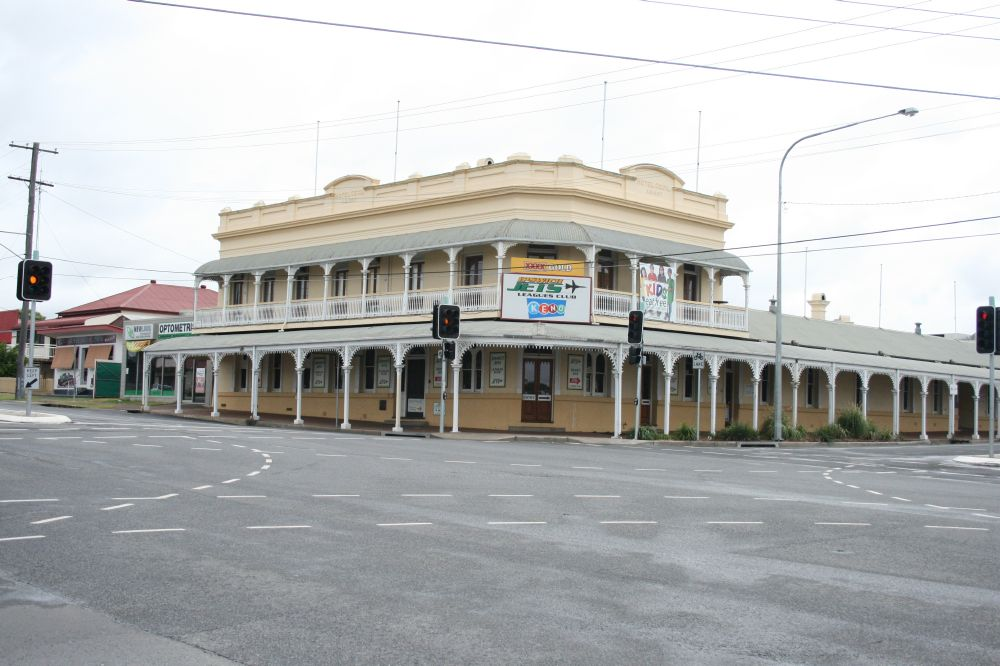
- Hotel Cecil, 2009

- Location within Queensland Location within Australia
- 27.6068°S 152.7608°E
- Location: 15 Lowry Street, North Ipswich, City of Ipswich, Queensland, Australia

History
- Design period: 1870s–1890s (late 19th century)
- Built: 1887–1999

Queensland Heritage Register
- Official name: Hotel Cecil, Imperial Hotel
- Type: state heritage (built)
- Designated: 21 October 1992
- Reference no.: 600603
- Significant period: 1880s (fabric); 1887–ongoing (historical use)
- Significant components: stained glass window/s

Hotel Cecil is a heritage-listed hotel at 15 Lowry Street, North Ipswich, City of Ipswich, Queensland, Australia. It was built from 1887 to 1999. It is also known as Imperial Hotel. It was added to the Queensland Heritage Register on 21 October 1992. The building has traded as the Jets Leagues Club since 1998.

== History ==
The first hotel to operate on this site was the Unity Hotel which opened in 1880 run by William Frederick Larter. In 1883 James Cooper took over the hotel and in 1887 he changed the name to the Imperial Hotel and an article in the Queensland Times of 19 April 1887 announced that he was trading out of the "recently erected and furnished" Imperial Hotel, on the corner of Downs and Lowry Streets, North Ipswich. The competition from this new hotel seems to have led to the closure within a year of the Royal Engineer's Hotel on the corner of Downs Street and The Terrace, which had been operating since the mid 1860s. The Queensland Times of April 1888 reported the transfer of the lease to John Abbott, but by April 1889 the Queensland Times reported that the hotel was part of John Abbott's Estate, and on 3 August 1889 the Queensland Government Gazette announced that John Cooper had regained the licence.

There was a push by Ipswich residents to close a number of hotels, as their numbers were then in excess of that allowable by legislation. John Cooper's Imperial Hotel was one of three that consequently lost their licences, as reported in the Queensland Times of 2 April 1891. However, in July 1891 there was an application by the National Workmen's Club for a club licence for the premises. Despite some reservations about whether the club had adequate control of the premises to satisfy the requirements for the licence, it was granted. The Government Gazette on 28 January 1904 announced the granting of a licence to Thomas Murray at the then-named Hotel Cecil. In 1904 the licensee was transferred to Thomas Murray, and in 1905 the licence passed to W Osborne. By 1911 it had passed to Alexander G Burnett, and in 1918 appears to have passed to his wife, Catherine. There has been a succession of licensees since this time.

In 1998, the venue was acquired by the Ipswich Jets rugby league club, ceased operation as a hotel, and began trading as a licensed club, the Jets Leagues Club. In 1999 the hotel was expanded along the Lowry Street frontage which houses a new dining and poker machine area. The middle section of the building previously accommodated a drive through bottle shop and is now a dining courtyard. The exterior of the extension has been designed to replicate the exterior of the original hotel on a single storey level.

== Description ==
The Hotel Cecil is a two storeyed rendered masonry hotel located on the corner of Down and Lowry Streets at North Ipswich. Built in 1887, the Hotel is constructed of brick with a rendered ruled ashlar finish with a continuous sill to the ground floor walls upon which semi circular headed openings with cement rendered architraves finish on plinth blocks. The main entry to the building is from Down Street through a large 6 panel timber door with sidelights and a semi headed fanlight decorated with leadlights that include the name 'Hotel Cecil 1887'and stained glass panels depicting native flora. There are additional entrances at the truncated corner of the building and two further along Lowry Street. The arched windows to the main bar areas at the main corner of the building comprise pairs of semi headed double hung windows with circular lights above.

Verandahs on timber posts with cast iron valance extend over the footpath with balconies above to both street frontages. The balconies have timber posts with cast iron balustrade and brackets. Pairs of frenchlights with fanlights above open onto the balconies.

Above the curved balcony roof the masonry walls are articulated by a cornice punctuated with pilasters in low relief the project above the coping on the parapet which conceals the corrugated iron roof. Centrally located on the parapet of each street frontage is a curved gable which bears the words HOTEL CECIL A.D. 1887 in raised lettering.

The interior of the hotel has been recently renovated in a style that replicates details from the period in which the building was constructed. Surviving original interior elements on the ground floor level include the cornices, ceilings and roses, the cedar fireplace mantle and staircase and the walls to the stairhall. The upper floor is in a comparatively intact condition and contains much of its original layout and joinery. The rear verandah has been enclosed and the rear stair survives.

The hotel was extended in 1915 with a skillion roof addition which included three windows to Lowry street. The recent extension has included the removal of the skillion roof and the extension of the building by several bays with a gable roof and verandah that then adjoins a single storey end wing with parapet. The end wing houses the bottle shop and new entrance to the hotel. These recent additions closely replicate the details of the original building.

== Heritage listing ==
Hotel Cecil was listed on the Queensland Heritage Register on 21 October 1992 having satisfied the following criteria.

The place is important in demonstrating the evolution or pattern of Queensland's history.

The former Hotel Cecil demonstrates the pattern of development in Ipswich in the 1880s when more substantial public buildings were replacing former more modest structures signifying the growth of Ipswich as a residential centre and its strength as an industrial and commercial centre.

The place is important because of its aesthetic significance.

The former Hotel Cecil demonstrates aesthetic significance as a mid-Victorian hotel with high streetscape value.

The place has a strong or special association with a particular community or cultural group for social, cultural or spiritual reasons.

The hotel has special association with the local community as a place of social activity since its opening in 1887.
