= Ipswich Railway Workshops War Memorial =

Heritage-listed memorial in Queensland, Australia

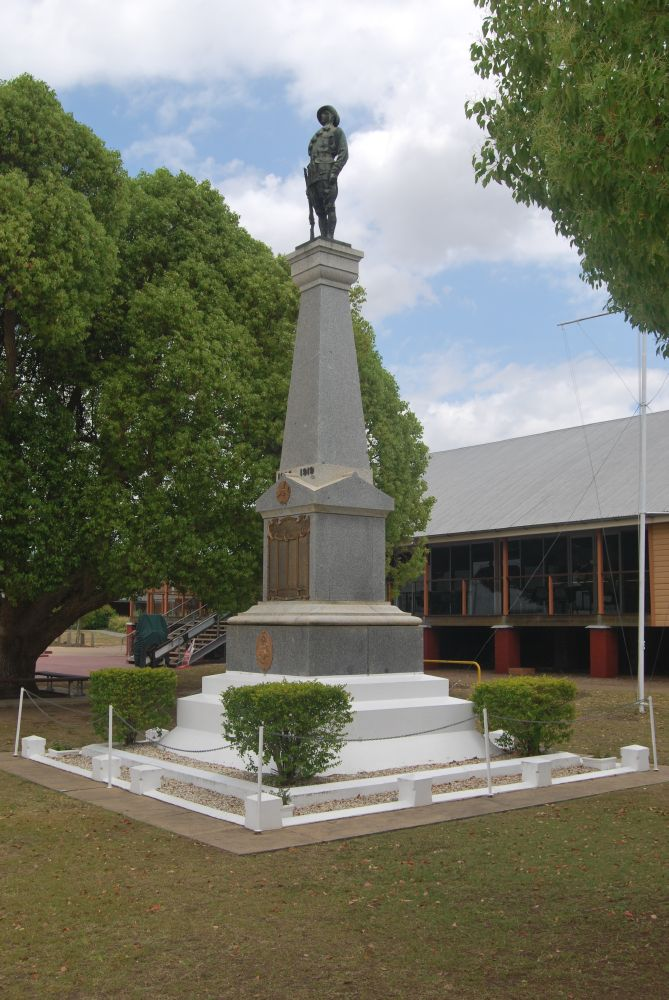
- Ipswich Railway Workshops War Memorial, 2014

- Location within Queensland
- 27.5973°S 152.7596°E
- Location: North Ipswich Railway Workshops, North Street, North Ipswich, City of Ipswich, Queensland, Australia

History
- Design period: 1900–1914 (early 20th century)
- Built: 1919

Site notes
- Architect: Vincent Price

Queensland Heritage Register
- Official name: Ipswich Railway Workshops War Memorial
- Type: state heritage (built)
- Designated: 21 October 1992
- Reference no.: 600605
- Significant period: 1919– (social); 1919 (historical); 1919 (fabric)
- Significant components: memorial – soldier statue, flagpole/flagstaff, trees/plantings

Ipswich Railway Workshops War Memorial is a heritage-listed memorial at the North Ipswich Railway Workshops, North Street, North Ipswich, City of Ipswich, Queensland, Australia. It was designed by Vincent Price and built in 1919. It was added to the Queensland Heritage Register on 21 October 1992.

== History ==
The Ipswich Railway Workshops War Memorial was unveiled on the 27 September 1919 by Queensland Governor, Sir Hamilton Goold-Adams. The stone memorial was designed by Queensland Railway architect Vincent Price and honours the 300 local men who left the workshops to serve in the First World War.

In July 1915 a mass meeting of the Railway Workshop employees was held to consider what could be done to perpetuate the memory of their 300 fellow employees who had left to serve in the war. By the end of the war 28 of these men had been killed and 3 had died on service.

At the meeting a committee was established to consider what form the memorial should take. It was decided to erect a monument and permission for its erection in the workshop grounds was gained from the Commissioner for Railways, Col. Barnard Charles Evans, CMG. The grandeur and comparatively high cost (£1400) of the monument is reflective of the patriotic spirit of the railway yard workers.

The unveiling on Saturday 27 September 1919 was a public event involving approximately 160 returned soldiers who marched from the Ipswich railway station under the charge of Lieutenant C W King. They were escorted by a Military Band to the workshops where they formed a guard of honour for the Governor.

Australia, and Queensland in particular, had few civic monuments before the First World War. The memorials erected in its wake became Australia's first national monuments, recording the impact of the war on the nation. Australia lost 60,000 from a population of about 4 million, representing one in five of those who served. No previous or subsequent war has had such an impact on the nation.

Even before the end of the war, memorials became a spontaneous and highly visible expression of national grief. To those who erected them, they were as sacred as grave sites, substitute graves for the Australians whose bodies lay in battlefield cemeteries in Europe and the Middle East. British policy decreed that the Empire war dead were to be buried where they fell. The word "cenotaph", commonly applied to war memorials at the time, literally means "empty tomb".

Australian war memorials are distinctive in that they commemorate not only the dead. Australians were proud that their first great national army, unlike other belligerent armies, was composed entirely of volunteers, men worthy of honour whether or not they made the supreme sacrifice. Many memorials honour all who served from a locality, not just the dead, providing valuable evidence of community involvement in the war. Such evidence is not readily obtainable from military records, or from state or national listings, where names are categorised alphabetically or by military unit.

Australian war memorials are also valuable evidence of imperial and national loyalties, at the time, not seen as conflicting; the skills of local stonemasons, metalworkers and architects; and of popular taste. In Queensland, the digger statue was the popular choice of memorial, whereas the obelisk predominated in the southern states, possibly a reflection of Queensland's larger working-class population and a lesser involvement of architects.

Many of the First World War monuments have been updated to record local involvement in later conflicts, and some have fallen victim to unsympathetic re-location and repair.

Although there are many different types of memorials in Queensland, the digger statue is the most common. It was the most popular choice of communities responsible for erecting the memorials, embodying the ANZAC spirit and representing the qualities of the ideal Australian: loyalty, courage, youth, innocence and masculinity. The digger was a phenomenon peculiar to Queensland, perhaps due to the fact that other states had followed Britain's lead and established Advisory Boards made up of architects and artists, prior to the erection of war memorials. The digger statue was not highly regarded by artists and architects who were involved in the design of relatively few Queensland memorials.

Most statues were constructed by local masonry firms, although some were by artists or imported.

The monument at Ipswich involved several makers and is an unusual example of the work of Queensland Railway architect, Vincent Price.

Price was born in Brisbane in 1868 and began his architectural career articled to Richard Gailey. He established his own practice in Brisbane in 1890 but soon became a draftsman in the Chief Engineers Office of Queensland Railways. He remained with the railways until he retired in 1933, his last position being that of Principal Railway Architect.

The digger statue is one of only two in Queensland designed by John Whitehead and Sons, sculptors of London. The pedestal was produced by A L Petrie and Sons of Toowong and the metal plates by Chas. Hanford of Brisbane.

The masonry firm of A L Petrie and Son at Toowong was the largest monumental masonry works in Queensland at this time and were responsible for producing many of the state's First World War memorials.

== Description ==
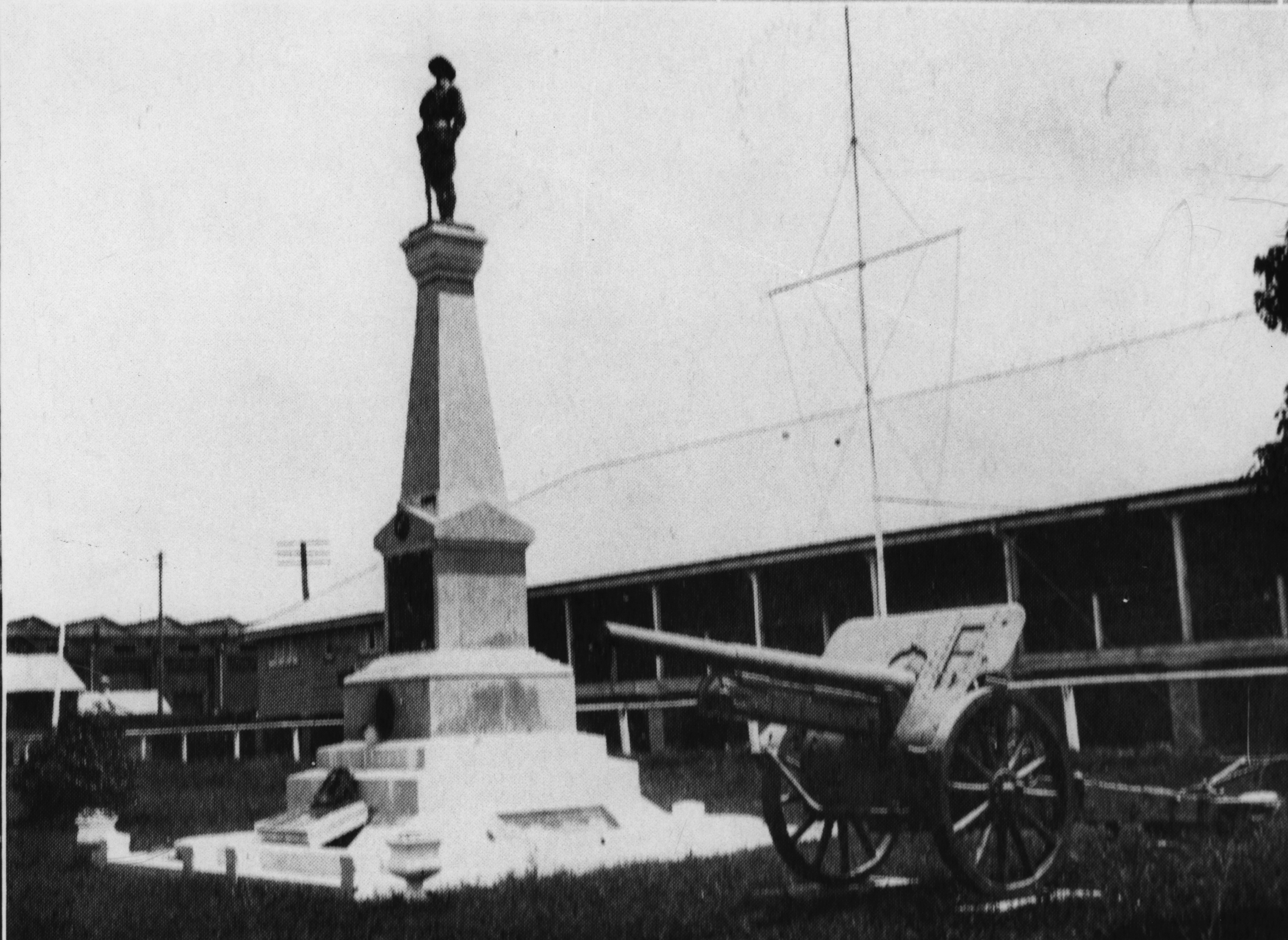
Railway Workshops War Memorial, Ipswich, 1925

The First World War Memorial is situated within the grounds of the North Ipswich Railway Workshops. It sits in a small grassed enclosure at the eastern end of the traverser, directly inside the main gate. The monument stands directly in front of a guyed flagstaff and is surrounded by a path which leads up to it. Large camphor laurel trees with circular seats are located nearby.

The memorial stands 32 feet (9.8 m) from the ground and comprises a pedestal and obelisk surmounted by a digger statue.

The granite and bronze memorial sits on a painted concrete stepped base, surrounded by two steps of kerbing. Surmounting the base is a Victorian granite pedestal with a bronze Coat of Arms on the front face. The pedestal is square in section and the front and rear faces display ornate bronze plaques with the Queensland Coat of Arms and the Queensland Railway Badge. The names of the 300 (approximately) men who left the works to fight for King and Empire in the European War are listed on the plaques with letters in columns after the names to indicate the 28 who were killed and the 3 who died on service. The plaques also bear the names of the 28 members of the memorial committee and trustees as well as historical inscriptions regarding the signing of the Armistice and Peace Treaty.

The pedestal is capped by four triangular pediments which support a tall obelisk of Victorian granite. A bronze Coat of Arms is located on the front pediment and the dates of the First World War are in bronze on the front face of the base of the obelisk.

Surmounting the obelisk is a digger statue, which at seven feet, is larger than life sized. The bronze statue portrays an Australian Infantry Soldier standing to attention with his rifle held upwards by his side.

== Heritage listing ==
Ipswich Railway Workshops War Memorial was listed on the Queensland Heritage Register on 21 October 1992 having satisfied the following criteria.

The place is important in demonstrating the evolution or pattern of Queensland's history.

War Memorials are important in demonstrating the pattern of Queensland's history as they are representative of a recurrent theme that involved most communities throughout the state. They provide evidence of an era of widespread Australian patriotism and nationalism, particularly during and following the First World War.

It is also an uncommon example of a monumental memorial erected in a workplace and is a historical record of the participation and sacrifice of a Queensland government agency.

The place demonstrates rare, uncommon or endangered aspects of Queensland's cultural heritage.

As a digger statue it is representative of the most popular form of memorial in Queensland, but is also unusual as one of only two bronze digger statues in the state supplied by a London sculptor.

It is also an uncommon example of a monumental memorial erected in a workplace and is a historical record of the participation and sacrifice of a Queensland government agency.

The place is important in demonstrating the principal characteristics of a particular class of cultural places.

The monuments manifest a documentary record of the impact of the First World War on a specific industrial community. They demonstrate aspects of popular aesthetic taste in the inter-war period.

Unveiled in 1919, the memorial at Ipswich Railway Workshops demonstrates the principal characteristics of a commemorative structure erected as an enduring record of a major historical event. This is achieved through use of appropriate materials and design elements. As a digger statue it is representative of the most popular form of memorial in Queensland, but is also unusual as one of only two bronze digger statues in the state supplied by a London sculptor.

The place is important because of its aesthetic significance.

The memorial is of aesthetic significance both for its design qualities and as a landmark within the railway precinct.

The place has a strong or special association with a particular community or cultural group for social, cultural or spiritual reasons.

It has a strong association with the railyard workforce as evidence of the impact of a major historic event. It also has strong associations with Queensland Railway architect, Vincent Price, as an unusual example of his work, and with monumental masonry firm A L Petrie and Son of Toowong.

The place has a special association with the life or work of a particular person, group or organisation of importance in Queensland's history.

It has a strong association with the railyard workforce as evidence of the impact of a major historic event. It also has strong associations with Queensland Railway architect, Vincent Price, as an unusual example of his work, and with monumental masonry firm A L Petrie and Son of Toowong.
