= North Ipswich, Queensland =

North Ipswich Ipswich, Queensland
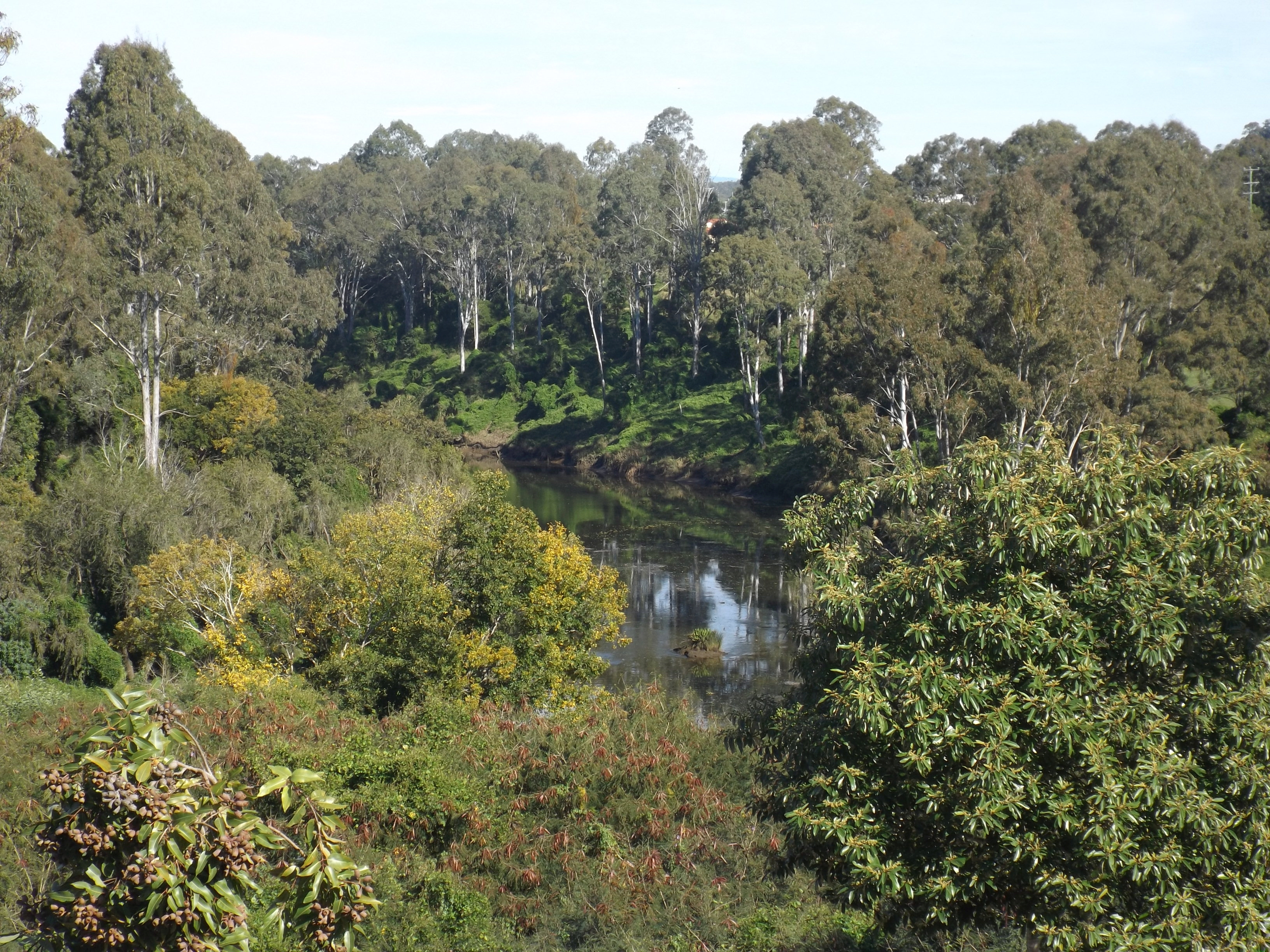
- Bremer River, 2015

- Coordinates: 27.5944°S 152.7608°E
- Population: 4,527 (2021 census)
  - Density: 1,078/km^{2} (2,790/sq mi)
- Postcode(s): 4305
- Area: 4.2 km^{2} (1.6 sq mi)
- Time zone: AEST (UTC+10:00)
- Location: 5.2 km (3 mi) N of Ipswich; 41.5 km (26 mi) SW of Brisbane CBD
- LGA(s): City of Ipswich
- State electorate(s): Ipswich West
- Federal division(s): Blair
Suburbs around North Ipswich:
Muirlea	Chuwar	Tivoli
Brassall	North Ipswich	Tivoli
Woodend	Ipswich	Basin Pocket; East Ipswich

North Ipswich is a suburb of Ipswich in the City of Ipswich, Queensland, Australia. In the 2021 census, North Ipswich had a population of 4,527 people.

Raymonds Hill is a neighbourhood within the suburb of North Ipswich.

== Geography ==
The southern boundary of the suburb follows the Bremer River. The Warrego Highway passes from east to west across the northern part of the suburb. Mount Crosby Road exits to the northeast, and Ipswich–Warrego Highway Connection Road enters from the south and exits to the northwest.

Raymonds Hill is near the centre of the suburb (27.5911°S 152.7561°E). The hill itself peaks at 63 metres (207 ft) above sea level (27.5906°S 152.7581°E).

== History ==
The suburb is so named because it is immediately north (across the Bremer River) from the centre of Ipswich. Raymond Hill was named after the hill which in turn was named after early land holders J & R Raymond.

North Ipswich is the birthplace of Queensland Rail. The original site is now the site of Riverlink shopping centre on The Terrace and the current site is used as a joint facility containing the Workshops Rail Museum. The suburb contains a large number of character and heritage listed houses, such as workers cottages that were home to the many railway workers.

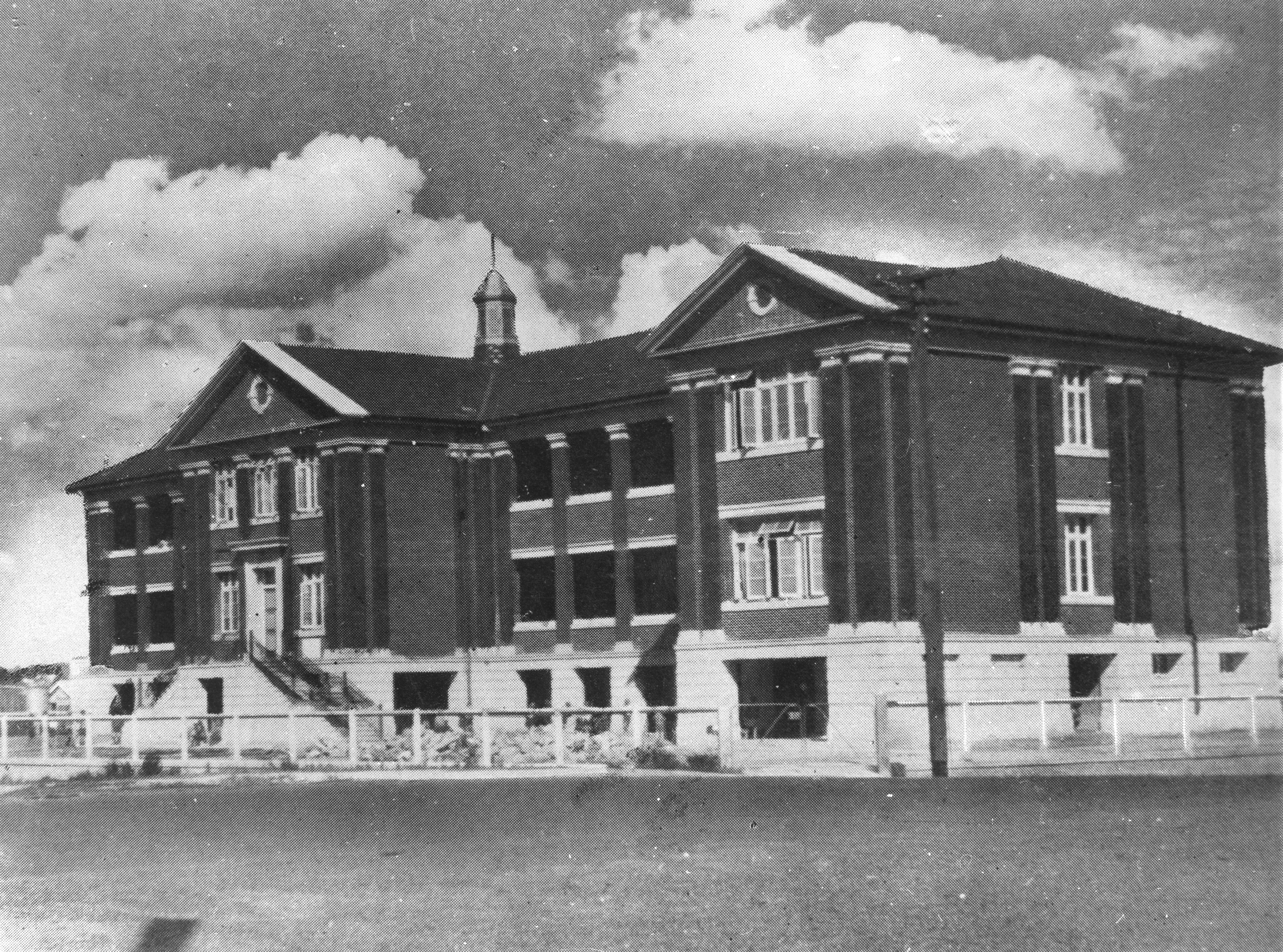
North Ipswich State School

Ipswich North State School opened on 5 July 1867 with girls and boys taught in separate rooms. In 1876 it split into two separate schools: Ipswich North Boys State School and Ipswich North Girls and Infants State School. In 1934 the two school were amalgamated to form Ipswich North State School once again.

A United Methodist Free Church opened in Canning Street on Sunday 22 March 1868. In July 1873 it relocated to Brisbane Street in the Ipswich CBD to leave the "comparative obscurity" of North Ipswich.

Circa 1888–1889 an Anglican church opened in North Ipswich.

In November 1900, approx. 150 allotments were advertised as "Railway Workshops Estate", to be auctioned by Cameron Brothers auctioneers.

On 1 March 1902, auctioneer E. Bostock offered 77 blocks in the "New Workshops Estate", of which 48 sold on the day. This estate was bounded by Albert Street to the west and north, by Tivoli Creek to the east, and Hill Street to the south. At that time the Tivoli railway line passed through the estate from north to south; the land corridor still exists but is now used a pedestrian path.

St Joseph's School opened on 13 August 1913.

In 1923 12 allotments were advertised for sale by Jackson & Meyers on Saturday, 7 July 1923. This area was called the "Stirling Estate" and was resubdivisions of subdivisions 1 and 2 of Allotment 5 of Section 45 in the parish of Chuwar. The land was bounded by Waterworks Road and Simmons Road in North Ipswich and according to the real estate map was within 10 minutes of the Railway Workshops. Later in 1923 it was advertised in the Queensland Times that there were still some allotments for sale.

North Ipswich Uniting Church was originally located at 105 Downs Street, North Ipswich. It was previously the North Ipswich Presbyterian Church, until the Uniting Church in Australia was established in 1977. Following its closure at this site it relocated to Brassall.

== Demographics ==
In the 2011 census, North Ipswich had a population of 4,587 people.

In the 2016 census, North Ipswich had a population of 4,515 people.

In the 2021 census, North Ipswich had a population of 4,527 people.

== Education ==
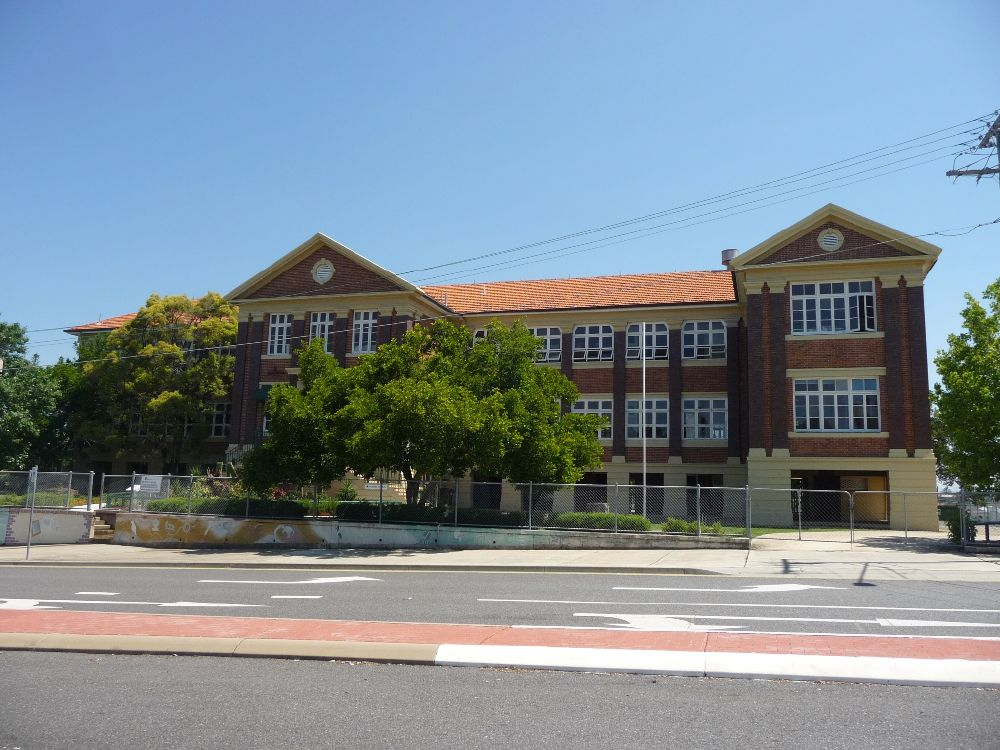
Ipswich North State School, 2015

Ipswich North State School is a government primary (Prep–6) school for boys and girls at 9 Fitzgibbon Street (27.6018°S 152.7633°E). In 2017, the school had an enrolment of 267 students with 18 teachers (17 full-time equivalent) and 15 non-teaching staff (11 full-time equivalent).

St Joseph's School is a Catholic primary (Prep–6) school for boys and girls at 42 Pine Mountain Road (27.5909°S 152.7575°E). In 2017, the school had an enrolment of 382 students with 27 teachers (22 full-time equivalent) and 16 non-teaching staff (12 full-time equivalent).

There are no secondary schools in North Ipswich. The nearest secondary school is Ipswich State High School in neighbouring Brassall.

== Monuments ==
- James Sangster Memorial. Browns Park contains the first police monument that was funded by public subscription. The monument was erected in memory of Constable James Sangster who drowned in the Brisbane river trying to save a young family from drowning in the 1893 Brisbane floods.
- Ipswich Railway Workshops War Memorial is a large World War I monument within the grounds of the North Ipswich Railway Workshops

== Heritage listings ==
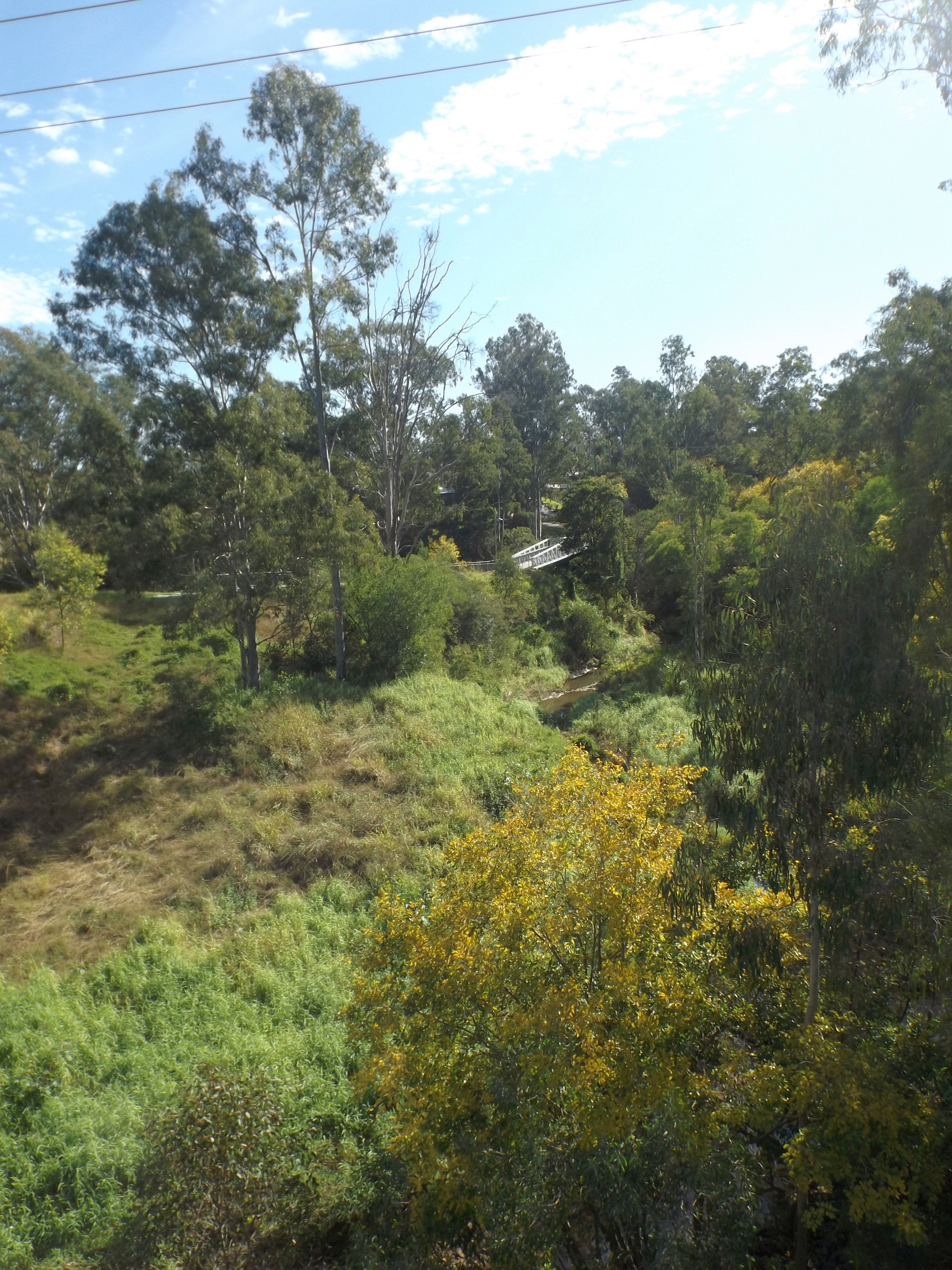
Mihi Creek Complex, 2015

North Ipswich has a number of heritage-listed sites, including:

Address	Coordinates	Name	Notes
About 130m west of the corner of WM Hughes Street and Musgrave Street	27.5951°S 152.7552°E	Sandstone Railway Culvert	
Bremer Street	27.6111°S 152.7606°E	Ipswich Town Wharves	
off Bremer Street	27.6104°S 152.7592°E	Bremer River Rail Bridge	
Downs Street	27.6053°S 152.7611°E	James Sangster Memorial	
2 Downs Street	27.609°S 152.7601°E	Heiner Road Railway Overpass	
9 Fitzgibbon Street	27.6025°S 152.7629°E	Ipswich North State School	
15 Lowry Street	27.6068°S 152.7608°E	Hotel Cecil	
Mihi Junction	27.5932°S 152.7536°E	Mihi Creek Complex	
North Street	27.6023°S 152.7572°E	North Ipswich Railway Workshops	
North Street	27.5973°S 152.7596°E	Ipswich Railway Workshops War Memorial	
North Street	27.6086°S 152.7604°E	Railway Historical Centre	
Parker Lane	27.593°S 152.7544°E	Klondyke Coke Ovens	
42 & 42B The Terrace	27.6107°S 152.766°E	former Queensland Woollen Manufacturing Company mill	
