= Raymonds Hill, Queensland =

Raymonds Hill
- Suburb
- Coordinates: 27.5900°S 152.7553°E
- Country: Australia
- State: Queensland
- City: Ipswich
- LGA: City of Ipswich
- Location: 3.6 km (2.2 mi) N of Ipswich CBD; 42.3 km (26.3 mi) SW of Brisbane CBD

Government
  - Federal division: Blair
- Postcode: 4305
Suburbs around Raymonds Hill
Muirlea	Muirlea	Muirlea
Brassall	Raymonds Hill	North Ipswich
Brassall	Woodend	North Ipswich

Raymonds Hill is a former suburb of Ipswich, Queensland, Australia.

== History ==
In the early 1990s, it was absorbed by neighbouring suburbs Brassall, the portion west of Waterworks Road, and North Ipswich. The remainder of Raymonds Hill is now officially a neighbourhood within North Ipswich.
