= Vincent Price (architect) =

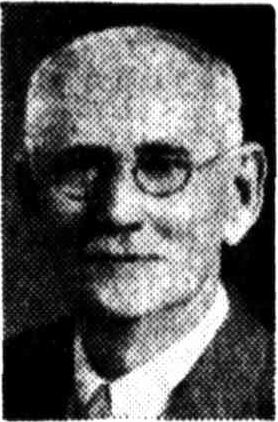
Vincent Price, railway architect, 1934

Vincent Price was a railway architect in Brisbane, Queensland, Australia.

== Early life ==
Vincent Price was born in Brisbane in 1868.

== Architecture ==
Price began his architectural career articled to Richard Gailey. He established his own practice in Brisbane in 1890 but soon became a draftsman in the chief engineers' office of Queensland Railways. He remained with the railways until he retired in May 1933 after 36 years of service, his last position being that of principal railway architect.

In 1936, Price was president of the Queensland chapter of the Royal Australian Institute of Architects.

== Significant works ==
His significant works include:

- Ipswich Railway Workshops War Memorial
- Toowoomba Railway Roll of Honour Board
