= Railway Historical Centre =

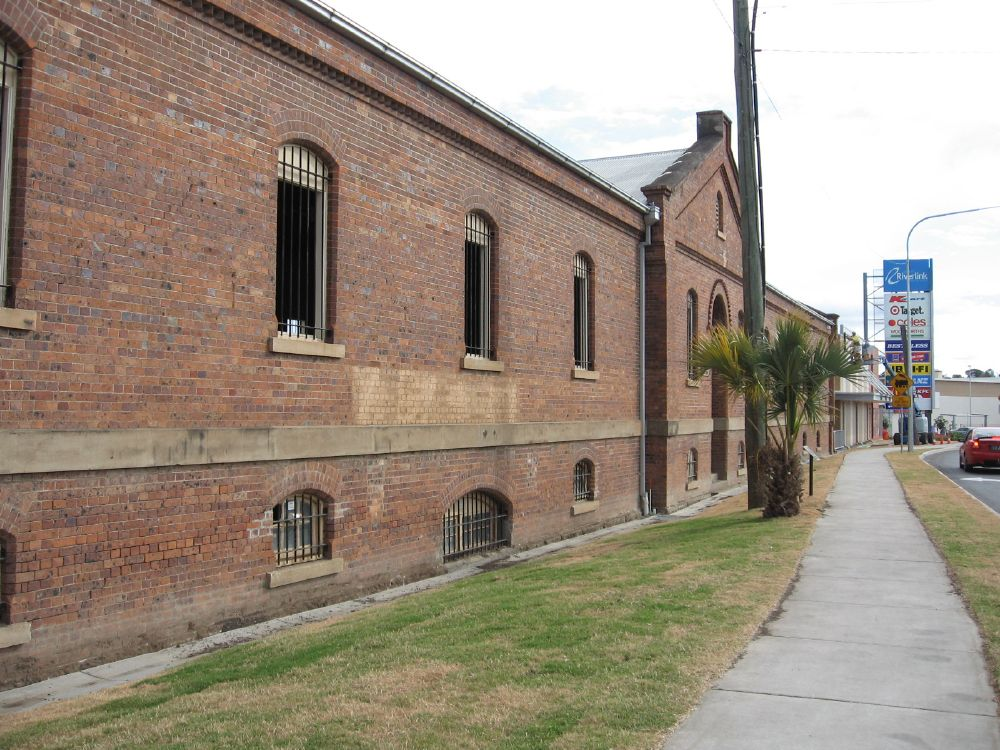
- Railway Historical Centre, 2007

- Location within Queensland Location within Australia
- 27.6086°S 152.7604°E
- Location: North Street, North Ipswich, City of Ipswich, Queensland, Australia

History
- Design period: 1870s–1890s (late 19th century)
- Built: 1878–1879

Site notes
- Architectural style: Classicism

Queensland Heritage Register
- Official name: Railway Historical Centre, Railway Administration Building, Railway Store, Tarpaulin Shop
- Type: state heritage (built)
- Designated: 21 October 1992
- Reference no.: 600604
- Significant period: 1878–1990 (historical)
- Significant components: track, loading bay/dock, views to, warehouse, windlass, office/s, crane / gantry, roof/ridge ventilator/s / fleche/s

Railway Historical Centre is a heritage-listed warehouse at North Street, North Ipswich, City of Ipswich, Queensland, Australia. It was built from 1878 to 1879. It is also known as Railway Administration Building, Railway Store, and Tarpaulin Shop. It was added to the Queensland Heritage Register on 21 October 1992.

== History ==
This building, the oldest remaining on the original North Ipswich Railway Workshops site, was built in 1878–9 by Ipswich contractors, McGregor and Brown. It was initially used as a store. It was later used for administration and then as a tarpaulin store. In 1990, the tarpaulin store was converted into the Railway Historical Centre and was used for housing railway archival material and for other related functions.

== Description ==
This is a fine example of a Victorian warehouse constructed of load-bearing brick on two levels. Outwardly, the building is a symmetrical gable ended structure with a centrally projecting transverse gable to the northern and southern facades. The formal entry is defined by a round headed arch and stairs leading up from The Terrace. Immediately opposite this on the southern side, is an upper level loading platform.

The symmetry of the building is reinforced by equally spaced segmental arch windows on both levels, and ridge ventilators at each end of the corrugated custom orb profile roof. Internally, the upper floor is dominated by Queen Post trusses which meet at the gable crossing with cruciform trusses. Along each end of the bottom chord are support rails with rope eyelets for suspension of tarpaulins. The original windlass is supported at the centre trusses for hoisting goods to and from the upper and lower levels through a timber trapdoor.

From the lower level, two large doors lead to the southern aligned railway tracks, and a tramway runs through the centre of the floor longitudinally. There is evidence of earlier service entry doors or cartways entering from the Terrace side.

The main timber floor frame is supported on sturdy hardwood columns with timber headstocks. Each bearer is jointed over the headstock with a scarfed joint and square timber key.

An early office compartment exists at the western end of the upper floor, constructed with a raised timber floor and tongue and groove timber partitions. At the eastern end there is a single storey timber frame extension which is not original.

== Heritage listing ==
Railway Historical Centre was listed on the Queensland Heritage Register on 21 October 1992 having satisfied the following criteria.

The place is important in demonstrating the evolution or pattern of Queensland's history.

The Railway Historical Centre is the only remaining building on the southern section of the site, it is evidence of the first period of development of the railway workshops 1864–1885.

The place is important in demonstrating the principal characteristics of a particular class of cultural places.

The building retains evidence of its various uses as stores, administration, and tarpaulin store.

The place is important because of its aesthetic significance.

It is fine example of a Victorian brick and stone warehouse and is of particular architectural merit.
