= Ipswich Town Wharves =

- Location within Queensland Location within Australia
- 27.6111°S 152.7606°E
- Location: Bremer Street, North Ipswich, City of Ipswich, Queensland, Australia

History
- Design period: 1840s–1860s (mid-19th century)
- Built: 1847–c. 1927

Queensland Heritage Register
- Official name: Remnants of Ipswich Town Wharves, Australasian Steam Navigation Wharf and William Collins and Son Wharf, J & G Harris Wharf, Walter Gray and Co Wharf
- Type: state heritage (archaeological)
- Designated: 31 July 2006
- Reference no.: 602567
- Significant period: 1840s–1920s (fabric, historical)
- Significant components: wall/s – retaining, pile/s, artefact field

Ipswich Town Wharves are heritage-listed remnants of wharves beside the Bremer River at Bremer Street, North Ipswich, City of Ipswich, Queensland, Australia. They were built from 1847 to c. 1927. They were known as Australasian Steam Navigation Wharf and William Collins and Son Wharf, J & G Harris Wharf, and Walter Gray and Co Wharf. They were added to the Queensland Heritage Register on 31 July 2006.

== History ==
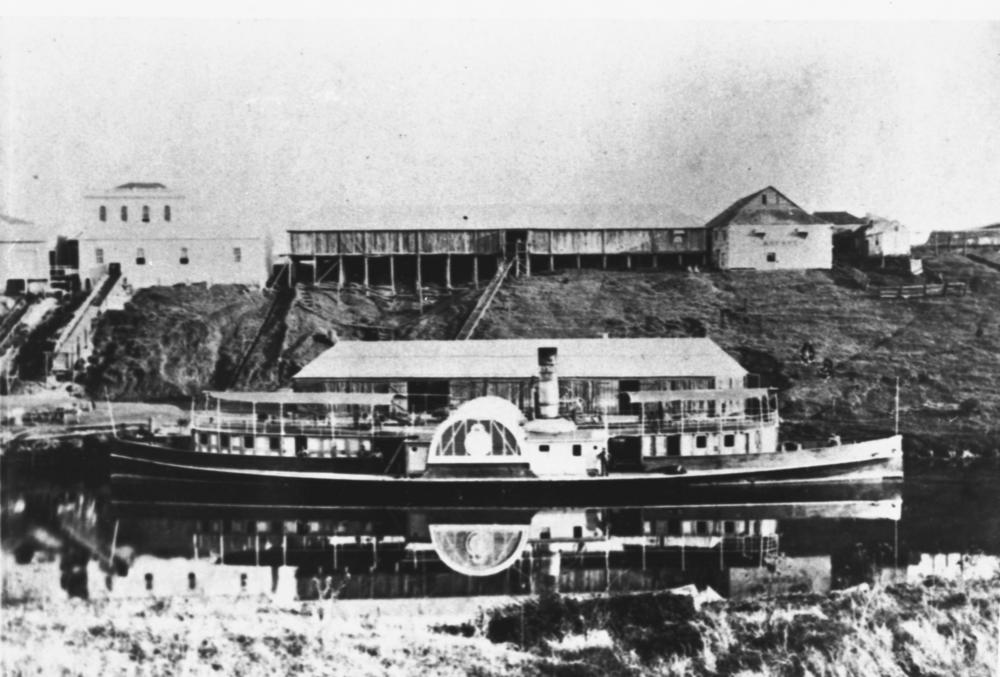
Ipswich paddlesteamer at Ipswich wharves, 1870

The remnants of Ipswich Town Wharves are an archaeological site that contains visible remains of two wharves. Horizontal timbers extending from the riverbank, together with an associated stone wall are probably the remnants of the Australasian Steam Navigation Wharf (c. 1867). Vertical piles projecting out of the river a short distance downstream are probably the remains of the J and G Harris landing (ca1862). The site was also the location of a wharf owned by Walter Gray & Co (1847–c. 1862) and was used by William Collins and Son in the first part of the twentieth century. Archaeological deposits originating from the wharves also exist on the riverbed.

Ipswich commenced as a convict outstation known as "Limestone" in 1827. After free settlement began in 1842, the township developed as an important regional centre because of its location at the head of navigation of the Brisbane and Bremer Rivers and at the junction of routes to the Brisbane Valley and the Darling Downs. Goods from these regions were channelled through Ipswich en route to the coast and this trade contributed significantly to Ipswich's rapid growth and prosperity.

The people of Ipswich, together with the Darling Downs pastoralists wielded considerable political influence and agitated for Ipswich, rather than Brisbane, to be made the colony's capital. One of the key factors in favour of Ipswich was its role as an inland port. It was argued that goods could be shipped from Ipswich directly to Moreton Bay, by-passing Brisbane.

There were sound practical reasons why this was a viable proposition. Poor road conditions meant that it was more convenient for the pastoralists to transport bulk goods from Ipswich to the coast along the Bremer and Brisbane Rivers using riverboats. This meant that goods had to be transferred from the riverboats to ocean-going vessels in Moreton Bay but this was necessary even for goods shipped from Brisbane because the Brisbane Bar prevented large vessels entering the river.

A pastoralist, James Pearce, started the first steamer service from Ipswich in 1846 using the vessel, Experiment. In 1848, a committee of townspeople was formed to upgrade the Ipswich "landing place" to a proper wharf with improved road access. By the 1860s a wharf precinct had developed between the present location of the railway bridge and The Basin, a section of the Bremer River downstream from the town centre that was wide enough to permit steamers to turn.

River trade peaked in the 1860s and 1870s, especially after Ipswich became the eastern rail terminus. In 1860, the Port of Moreton Bay was extended to Ipswich. At least six wharves lined the south bank of the Bremer between The Basin and the bridge. The wharves were linked to large stores built along the north side of Bremer Street. Bales of wool and cotton were slid down chutes to smaller wharf-side sheds. The wharf remnants presently located on the site were once among the largest and most important in the precinct.

Walter Gray's wharf, which was located at Site One, was one of the first wharves to be established in the precinct. In 1847, Gray, a Scottish immigrant, occupied a block of land that extended from Bremer Street to the riverbank at Site One. He commenced business as a general storekeeper and agent trading in wool and other produce which he conveyed to Brisbane using Reid and Boyland's punts. His business reputedly became the largest mercantile house in the district operating extensive stores capable of holding several hundred bales of wool.

Gray became a prominent member of the Ipswich community. He was treasurer of the committee of Ipswich businessmen that built the Ipswich town wharf in 1848. He supported establishing Cleveland as the colony's main port and, in the 1850s, together with other Ipswich businessmen, bought land and signified his intention to build jetties there where punts could load and unload cargoes. Gray promoted cotton cultivation and was a shareholder and director of the Ipswich Cotton Company. In 1860 when the Port of Moreton Bay was extended to Ipswich, his facilities were licensed as the bonded store where dutiable goods could be stored.

In 1856, a surveyor described the wharf as "not a properly built wharf, but more of an earth bank". Associated facilities included a shed enclosed on one side with bark near the river, a slab and shingle wool store higher up the bank, a wooden slide down to the wharf from the store, and a road "cut into the bank and made with stone". By 1861, wool presses, at least one of which was steam powered, were located on either side of the stores fronting Bremer Street. A steam-powered cotton gin was added, probably in early 1862. Gray also had a store on the corner of Bell and Bremer Streets.

Walter Gray died in 1862 and, by 1865, John and George Harris, merchants and agents from Brisbane, had taken over the wharf site. Harris's and Gray had jointly acted as agents for at least one ocean- going ship just prior to his death. J and G Harris built a large brick store on the southern side of Bremer Street on the Bell Street corner opposite the wharf. They probably also upgraded the wharf to a more substantial timber landing with a new wharf-side shed in the early 1860s. The upstream side of the new shed was shaped in a "v" configuration to withstand water pressure on the regular occasions that the Bremer flooded the site. In 1867 J & G Harris was paying rent for a water frontage of 130 feet (40 m). This was the third largest frontage in the precinct. Harris's appears to have ceased operation at the site by 1878 when they applied to the Ipswich Town Clerk to remove their buildings.

The Australasian Steam Navigation Company (ASN) wharf was established next to Gray's wharf between 1856 and 1861. ASN had an interest in the Ipswich shipping trade as early as 1856 when Gray acted as their agent. In 1860 they launched a steamer, Ipswich, specifically for trade between Brisbane and Ipswich. By July 1861, the company had acquired the site next to Gray's and had completed improvements on it.

Originally formed in Sydney in 1839/40 as The Hunter's River Steam Navigation Company, ASN had become the principal shipping firm in the Australian coastal trade by the 1850s. The company commenced a regular service to Moreton Bay when it opened to free settlement in 1842 and in 1844 they established their first wharf facility in Brisbane. The company's activities contributed significantly to the expansion of settlement in Queensland.

Initially, the ASN wharf was a small timber wharf or an "earth bank" similar to Gray's wharf. A shed was located immediately adjacent to the wharf and a store fronted Bremer Street. A slide linked the wharf-side shed and the store.

ASN rebuilt most of their wharf facilities in 1867 after a flood had destroyed their earlier buildings. A new 90-foot-long (27 m) shed was built next to the wharf, with 50 feet (15 m) of this partitioned off for customs use. The walls were 10 feet (3.0 m) high and the centre beam, 17 feet (5.2 m) high. The structure was fastened with iron ties and braces and roofed with galvanised iron. Like Harris's shed, the upstream wall was shaped in a "v" configuration to deflect floodwaters. A new wharf was also built at this time. In 1867, ASN were paying rent for a river frontage of 163 feet (50 m), the largest in the precinct. ASN had probably ceased operations from the Ipswich wharf by 1874 and in 1879 their wharf lease terminated.

After 1875, when the rail link to Brisbane was opened, the period of intense riverboat activity ended. A partial revival of river trade occurred in the 1890s, probably due in part to the lack of a rail link to Brisbane after the loss of the Albert Bridge at Indooroopilly in the 1893 flood. However, the economic and political motives that had stimulated the trade in the 1860s and 1870s no longer existed, and it became difficult to justify expending money on keeping the river route viable.

Nevertheless, two commercial river services operated in the early 20th century from the site. In 1903 William Collins & Son used a wharf next to the remains of Harris's wharf. Collins operated a number of vessels between Brisbane and Ipswich including the Mary, Eucalypta, Essex, Myora and Advance. A "stiff legged" timber crane was used to unload goods at the wharf. Increasingly unable to compete with road transport, Collins ceased the river service cira 1927.

In 1932 Percy Manders commenced trading using the 40-foot (12 m) cargo vessel MV Eclipse. Manders made three trips weekly carrying 18–20 metric tons (18–20 long tons; 20–22 short tons) of all kinds of merchandise. He initially used the former Collins wharf and crane.

Virtually no further development took place at the site from the time of Manders' operation until 2006 when the area was landscaped as part of the River Terraces development.

Prior to this development, in January 2006, archaeological surveys were completed at the sites. These surveys mapped the remains of the wharves and recovered artefacts.

== Description ==
The wharf remains are located in the River Terraces development at Ipswich, between the railway bridge and the David Trumpy road bridge.

=== Site 1 ===
The central position on the riverbank of this site is approximately 27°36′40″S 152°45′39″E. Two timber piles are extant on the site projecting out of the water at low tide. These are 3.8 metres (12 ft) apart and each average 16 centimetres (6.3 in) in diameter. They stand 1.27 metres (4 ft 2 in) from the riverbed to top. They are constructed from a dark red timber, possibly iron bark.

An associated artefact field on the riverbed extends up to 18 metres (59 ft) downstream from the downstream pile and upstream merges into the artefact field associated with Site 2. It extends up to 12 metres (39 ft) into the river channel.

=== Site 2 ===
The central position of this site is approximately 27°36′39″S 152°45′37″E. Three timber bearers measuring about 30 centimetres (12 in) in diameter project up to 2.9 metres (9 ft 6 in) horizontally from the riverbank. The outer ends are modified (scarfed) on the underside to enable them to sit onto piles or a wharf head. The timber may be turpentine. A stone wall underneath these bearers is built into the riverbank. This wall is covered at high tide.

An associated artefact field extends upstream from the site and downstream merges with artefacts associated with site 1. The field extends up to 17 metres (56 ft) into the river channel.

== Heritage listing ==
Remnants of Ipswich Town Wharves was listed on the Queensland Heritage Register on 31 July 2006 having satisfied the following criteria.

The place is important in demonstrating the evolution or pattern of Queensland's history.

The Remnants of Ipswich Town Wharves on the town reach of the Bremer River, are important in demonstrating the evolution of Queensland's history insofar that they are surviving evidence of the important early river commerce between Ipswich and the coast. Ipswich was one of the first river ports to be established in the colony. As the westernmost point of access to Moreton Bay via the Bremer and Brisbane Rivers, the town was a major port for the Darling Downs and West Moreton until the railway opened to Brisbane in 1875. During this period, the Bremer and Brisbane Rivers below Ipswich constituted one of the most important mercantile routes in the colony. The wharf remnants are evidence of this commerce and Ipswich's key role in it. The wharf remnants are also physical evidence of an important aspect of the historical rivalry between Ipswich and Brisbane. The river trade, in which the wharves played a vital role, underpinned Ipswich's rapid growth and prosperity and was the key to its viability as an alternative export port to Brisbane. The river commerce was an important factor in the town's bid to become the colony's capital.

The place demonstrates rare, uncommon or endangered aspects of Queensland's cultural heritage.

The Remnants are rare as surviving physical evidence of the early commerce between Ipswich and the coast along the Bremer River and Brisbane Rivers. There are no other known remains of this important early trade route. The remnants of the wharves are uncommon insofar that they constitute a largely undisturbed archaeological site in an urban setting. The site functioned as a wharf precinct from the 1840s until at least the 1930s. From that period until 2006, no significant built development took place on the riverbank or in the river.

The place has potential to yield information that will contribute to an understanding of Queensland's history.

As an archaeological site, the remnants of the wharves have the potential to yield information that will contribute to an understanding of the historical river trade along the Bremer and Brisbane Rivers and Ipswich's role in this. They also have the potential to contribute to our knowledge of trade to and from the Darling Downs and West Moreton, regions that made an important contribution to the development of Queensland. Most of the goods being conveyed to or from these areas prior to 1875 were channelled through the Ipswich wharves. The site has the potential to contribute to our knowledge of the Australasian Steam Navigation Company (ASN). An ASN wharf occupied the site from ca 1861 to ca 1874. ASN was the principal shipping firm in the Australian coastal trade by the 1850s. Its activities contributed significantly to the expansion of settlement in Queensland.
