= Queensland Government Gazette =

Government gazette of Queensland, Australia

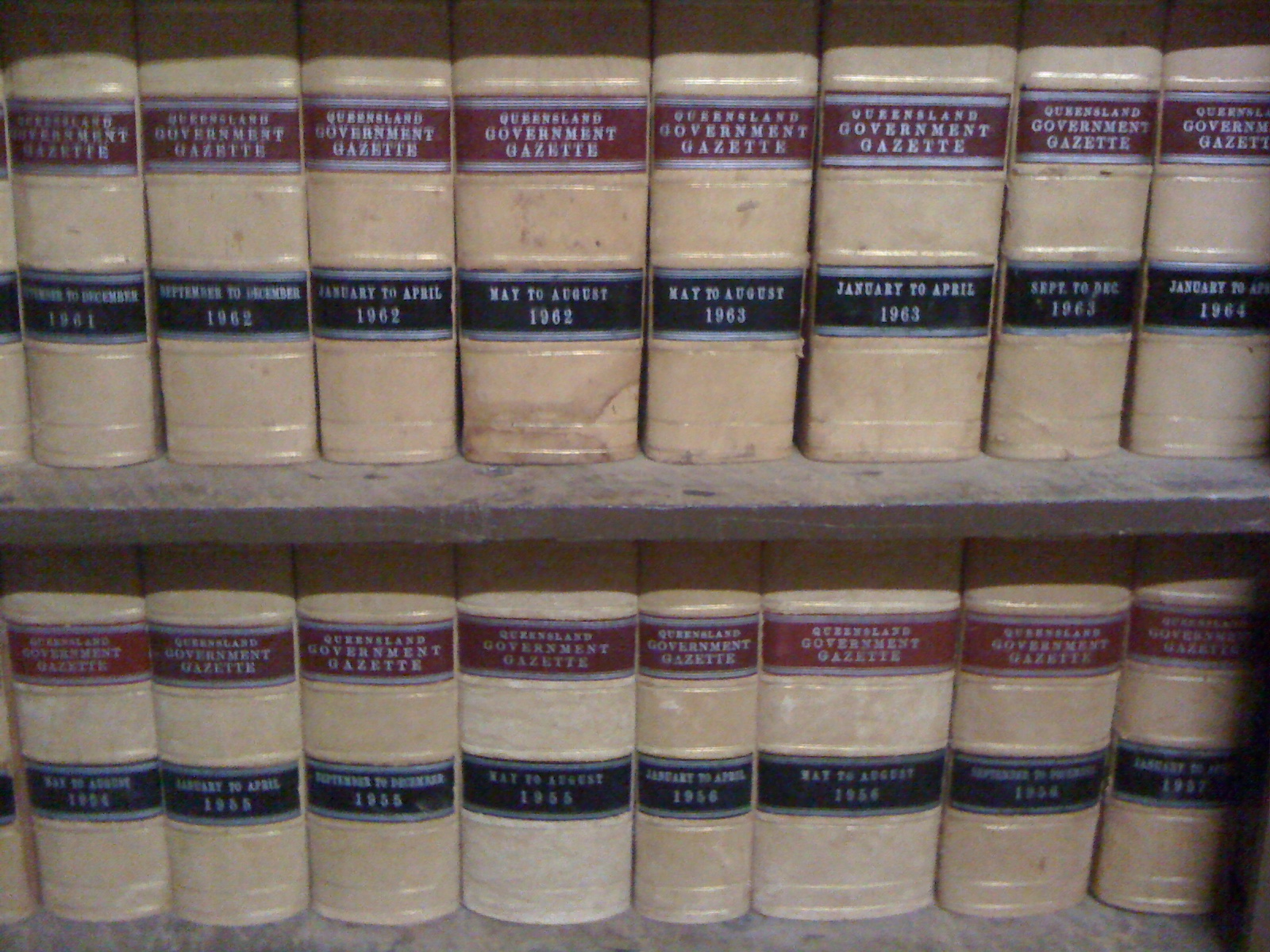
Bound volumes of the Queensland Government Gazette

The Queensland Government Gazette is the government gazette of the Government of Queensland in Australia. It lists appointments and public notices including new legislation. Traditionally, publication in the gazette was a legal requirement for an announcement to be official; however, in present times, other methods of communication have replaced some aspects of the gazette's role. It is normally published weekly, but extraordinary editions can be published in between the regular weekly issues if there is an urgent need.

== History ==
The first Queensland Government Gazette was published on Saturday 10 December 1859, immediately following the separation of Queensland which was proclaimed on 9 December 1859 with the arrival of the first Queensland Governor George Bowen with the Letters Patent signed by Queen Victoria. The first issue of the Gazette includes the Letters Patent.

== Availability ==
Digital edition of the Queensland Government Gazette, 17 January 2014

The 1859 to 1900 editions of the Queensland Government Gazette have been digitised and are available online. Since 2003, the Gazette has been routinely published online. The last printed edition of the gazette was published on Friday 30 November 2012 with only online and CD-ROM formats being available since then.

== See also ==
- List of government gazettes
