= Lockyer railway station =

Former railway station in Queensland, Australia

Lockyer

General information
- Location: Montgomery Road, Lockyer, Queensland
- Coordinates: 27°30′27″S 152°05′01″E
- Line: Main
- Connections: no connections

History
- Closed: Yes

Services
Preceding station	Queensland Rail	Following station
Helidon towards Brisbane	Main Line railway	Murphys Creek towards Toowoomba
Location

Lockyer railway station is a closed railway station on the Main Line railway in Queensland, Australia. It served the locality of Lockyer in the Lockyer Valley Region.

== Description ==
The station building has been relocated to Murphy Creek Grounds in Murphys Creek.
