= Gatton railway station =

Railway station in Queensland, Australia

Gatton
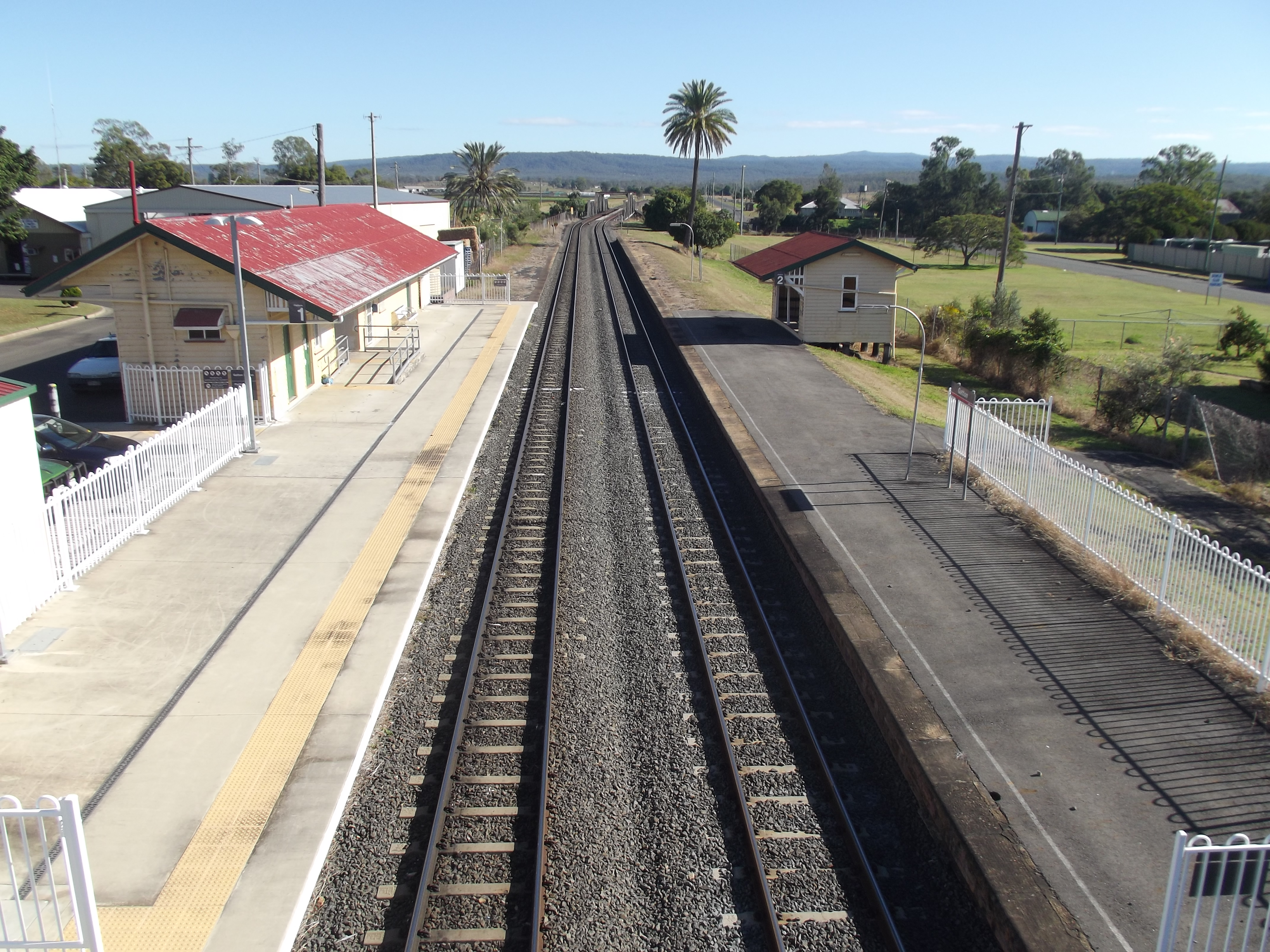
- Westbound view in July 2013 looking towards Toowoomba and Charleville

General information
- Location: Crescent Street, Gatton
- Coordinates: 27.5545°S 152.2776°E
- Owner: Queensland Rail
- Operator: Traveltrain
- Line: Main
- Distance: 97.16 kilometres from Central
- Platforms: 2 side
- Tracks: 2

Construction
- Structure type: Ground

History
- Opened: 1866

Services
Preceding station	Queensland Rail	Following station
Laidley towards Brisbane	The Westlander	Helidon towards Charleville
Former service
Lawes towards Brisbane	Main Line railway	Grantham towards Toowoomba
Location

Gatton railway station is located on the Main line in Queensland, Australia. It serves the town of Gatton in the Lockyer Valley Region. The station has two side platforms, opening in 1866.

== Services ==
Gatton is served by Queensland Rail Travel's twice weekly Westlander service travelling between Brisbane and Charleville.

== Transport links ==
Laidley Bus Services operates one bus route via Gatton station:

- 539: Helidon to Rosewood station service - this service was once operated by McCafferty's (now operating under the auspices of Greyhound Australia)

until the end of 1993, 539 used to travel to Toowoomba where it connected with 5R16 Railmotor Service to Roma and its return service 5565.
