= Grantham railway station, Queensland =

Former railway station in Queensland, Australia

Grantham

General information
- Location: Railway Street, Grantham, Queensland
- Coordinates: 27°34′30″S 152°12′09″E
- Line: Main

History
- Closed: Yes

Services
Preceding station	Queensland Rail	Following station
Gatton towards Brisbane	Main Line railway	Helidon towards Toowoomba
Location

Grantham railway station was a railway station on the Main Line railway in Queensland, Australia. It served the town of Grantham in the Lockyer Valley Region.

A flash flood in 2011 destroyed the railway line near Grantham.

== Description ==
The station building has been removed to the Gatton And District Historical Museum at Gatton in 1996, though the site still houses some sheds and a concrete platform on the northern side of the railway.
