= Yarongmulu railway station =

Former railway station in Queensland, Australia

Yarongmulu

General information
- Location: Ryan Road, Laidley, Queensland
- Coordinates: 27°39′11″S 152°25′16″E
- Line: Main
- Connections: no connections

History
- Closed: Yes

Services
Preceding station	Queensland Rail	Following station
Former service
Grandchester towards Brisbane	Main Line railway	Laidley towards Toowoomba
Location

Yarongmulu railway station is a closed railway station on Queensland's Main Line. It was given a name in February 1913. Until 1992, Yarongmulu was a staffed crossing loop at the eastern portal of the Victoria Tunnel.

Only the abandoned signal box and privately owned signalman's house remains of the station.
