= Lawes railway station =

Former railway station in Queensland, Australia

Lawes

General information
- Location: Dodt Road, Lawes, Queensland
- Coordinates: 27°39′11″S 152°25′16″E
- Line: Main
- Connections: no connections

History
- Closed: Yes

Services
Preceding station	Queensland Rail	Following station
Former service
Forest Hill towards Brisbane	Main Line railway	Gatton towards Toowoomba
Location

Lawes railway station is a closed railway station on the Main Line railway in Queensland, Australia. It served the locality of Lawes in the Lockyer Valley Region.

== Description ==
The station building has been demolished, though the dirt carpark and an abandoned section of concrete path remains visible, beside an electrical works box.
