= Grandchester railway station =

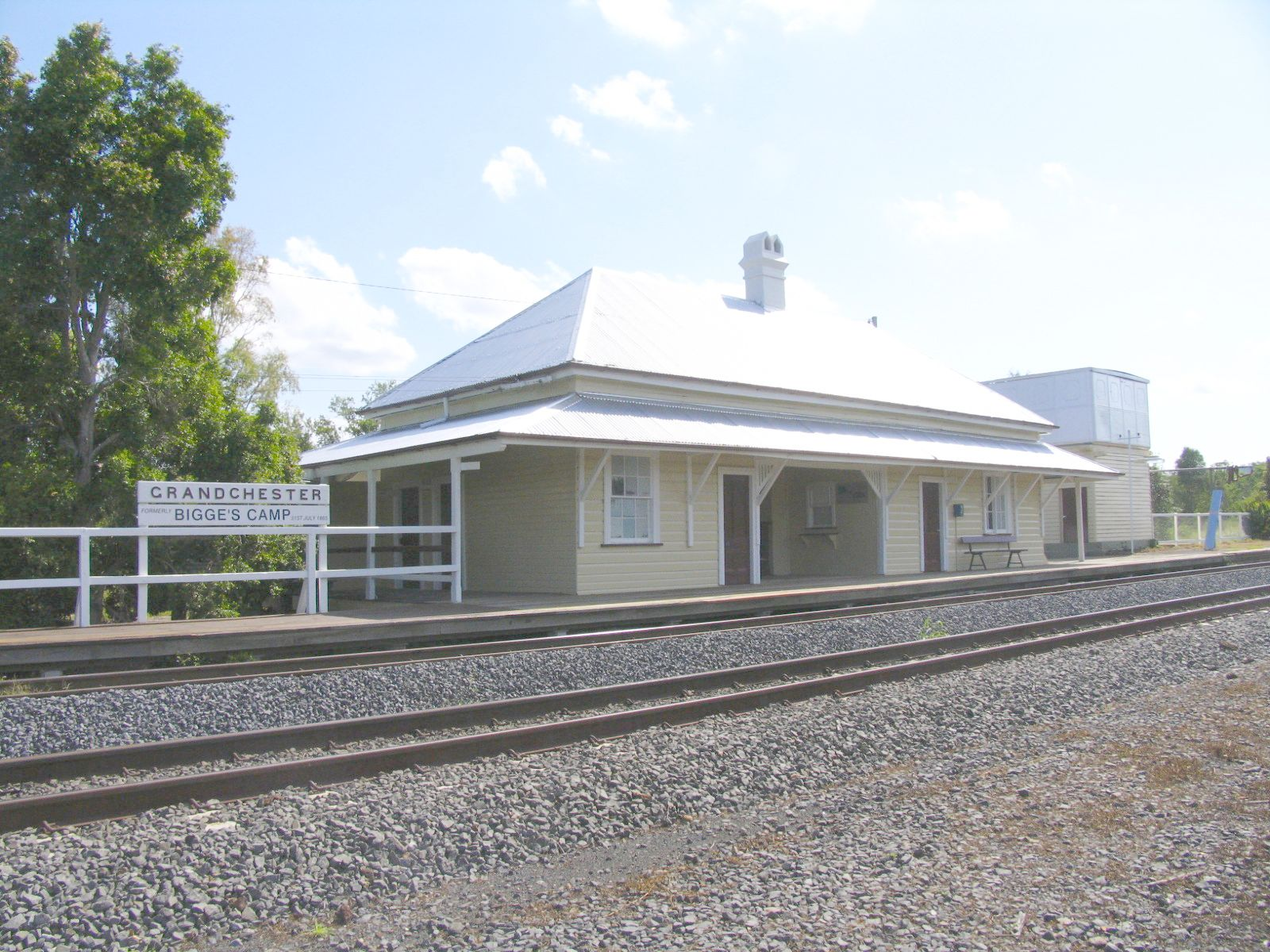
- Grandchester railway station, 2006

- Location within Queensland Location within Australia
- 27.6627°S 152.4663°E
- Location: Ipswich Road, Grandchester, City of Ipswich, Queensland, Australia

History
- Design period: 1870s - 1890s (late 19th century)
- Built: 1875 - 1876

Queensland Heritage Register
- Official name: Grandchester Railway Complex, Bigge's Camp
- Type: state heritage (built)
- Designated: 21 October 1992
- Reference no.: 600729
- Significant period: 1875-1960s (historical)
- Significant components: residential accommodation - station master's house/quarters, tower - water, chimney/chimney stack, pump house, office/s, waiting room, shed - storage, tank - water, views to, memorial - honour board/ roll of honour, platform, railway station, well, machinery/plant/equipment - transport - rail, signals
Preceding station	Queensland Rail	Following station
Former service
Calvert towards Brisbane	Main Line railway	Yarongmulu towards Toowoomba

Grandchester railway station is a heritage-listed former railway station at Ipswich Road, Grandchester, City of Ipswich, Queensland, Australia. It was built from 1875 to 1876. It is also known as Bigge's Camp. It was added to the Queensland Heritage Register on 21 October 1992.

== History ==
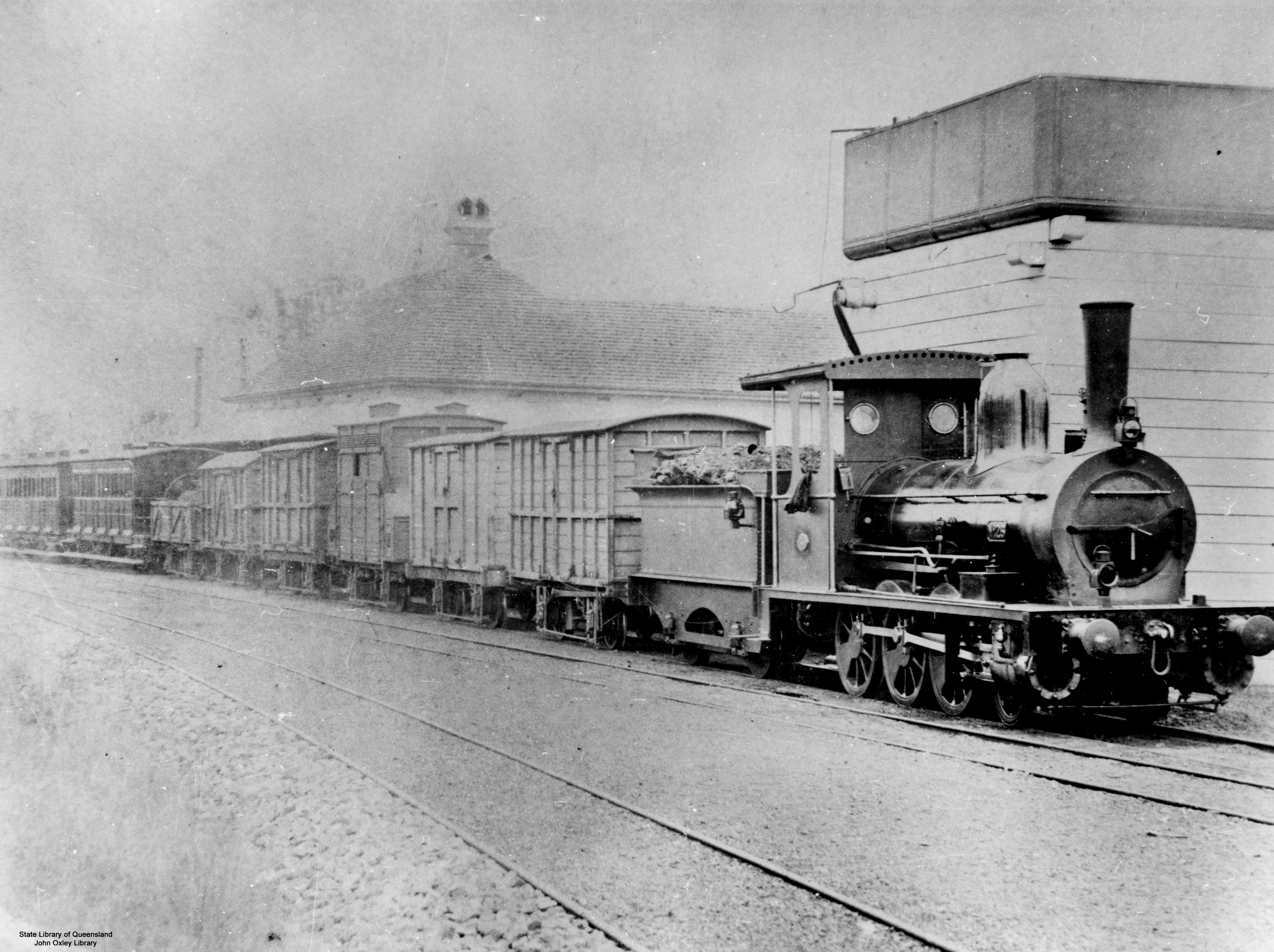
Steam train at Grandchester Railway Station Queensland, circa 1879

Grandchester, originally known as Bigge's Camp, is the western terminus for the first railway in Queensland and the first section of the Main Line to Toowoomba, opened from Ipswich on 31 July 1865. The building was constructed by J. and R Fisher of Westminster, England. Works were carried out to the station building in 1875 and 1876. The goods shed was also built in that year. T. Neville signed a contract to undertake work on the station buildings on 19 December 1878.

The tank was relocated from Laidley in 1876 and a locomotive stationed here from 1885 to assist trains over the Little Liverpool Range. James Stewart signed a contract on 14 March 1885 to build an engine shed, and Worley and Whitehead signed a contract to build a second goods shed on 15 June 1885.

The station master's house was built in 1910 and alterations carried out to the station building around that time. By 1961 the complex consisted of a station building with signal cabin, two tanks, cream shed, closet, pumphouse, station master's house, forkline to cattleyards, engine shed and coal stage. The engine shed had been demolished by 1963 and the trucking yards were discontinued in 1991.

The station buildings are now operated by the Queensland branch of the National Trust of Australia. It is open to the public once a month, with volunteers offering guided tours.

== Description ==
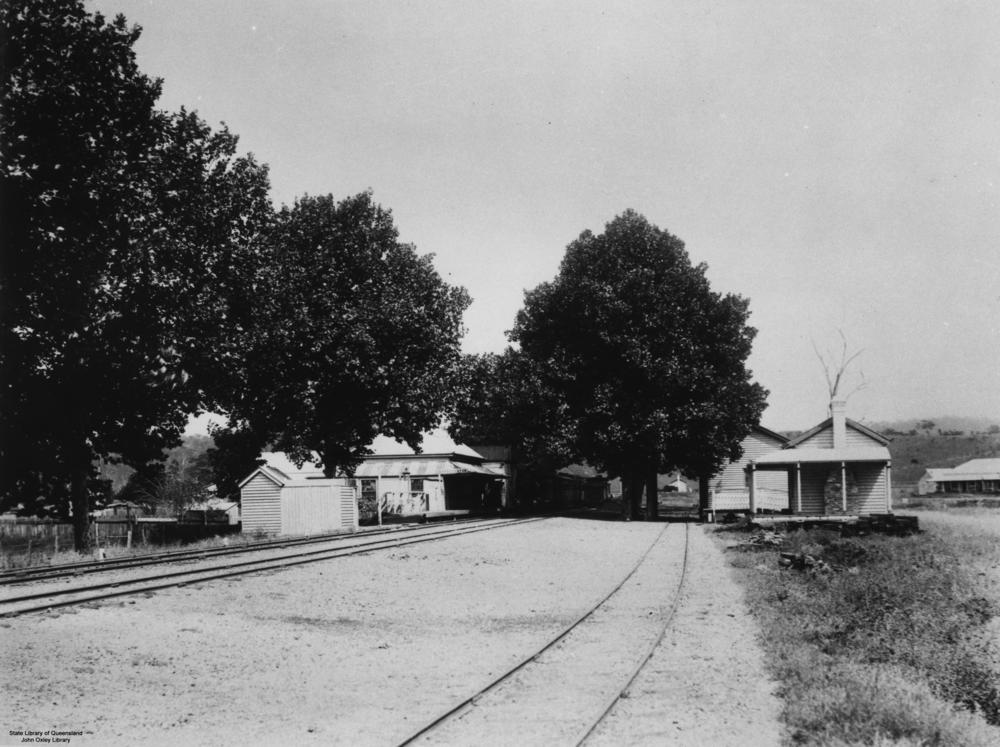
Grandchester railway station, circa 1915

Grandchester is in a predominately rural setting in a bend on the Western Creek. The station building is situated on a timber platform and adopts a unique architectural form with a hipped roof and peripheral verandah to all elevations, posted on the ends and roadside and carried on later plain brackets over the platform. There is a prominent central chimney stack with arched cowls (compare with the surviving station master's house at Wallangarra railway station (1887) and the former at Esk (1886)).

External linings are rusticated with 265-millimetre (10.4 in) exposed faces and double hung windows without horns having glazing bards. Internal alterations have been extensive although evidence of the original two bedrooms, living room, waiting room and office is presumed to exist, especially in the form of early timber ceiling linings and cornices. There is a roll of honour board inside, painted by Hugh F. O'Brien, Toowoomba.

There is a signal cabin with a 22 lever T-bar machine in the down end of the building, placed out of service presumably in 1988 with the introduction of centralized traffic control (CTC).

The tank is a two tier cast iron tank altered from a single tier tank at an unknown date. The linings to the stand are recent and the shaped ends to the main beams project through the linings. There is an associated dam which is presumed to supply the tank, also a brick well and associated pumphouse.

The station master's house is a standard elevated second class house with a pyramidal roof, peripheral verandah and (possibly later) ventilator. The verandah post enrichment may be uncommon, but the overall form is not uncommon.

== Heritage listing ==
Grandchester Railway Complex was listed on the Queensland Heritage Register on 21 October 1992 having satisfied the following criteria.

The place is important in demonstrating the evolution or pattern of Queensland's history.

Grandchester Railway complex has historical importance as the western terminus of the first railway in Queensland, opened on 31 July 1865.

Grandchester as a place is commonly acknowledged to be an historical railway site of State significance. It was the first railway station built in Queensland using local materials.

The place demonstrates rare, uncommon or endangered aspects of Queensland's cultural heritage.

The survival of a station building incorporating quarters is also rare (compare Clifton, Springsure and Pentland).

The place is important in demonstrating the principal characteristics of a particular class of cultural places.

The station building and tank are key elements demonstrating its early date and are understood to have existed on this site from the mid-late 1870s, predating other railway buildings in Queensland with the possible exception of Gracemere (Central Line), Murphys Creek (Main Line), Nobby and Clifton (Southern Line).
