= Helidon railway station =

Railway station in Queensland, Australia

Helidon
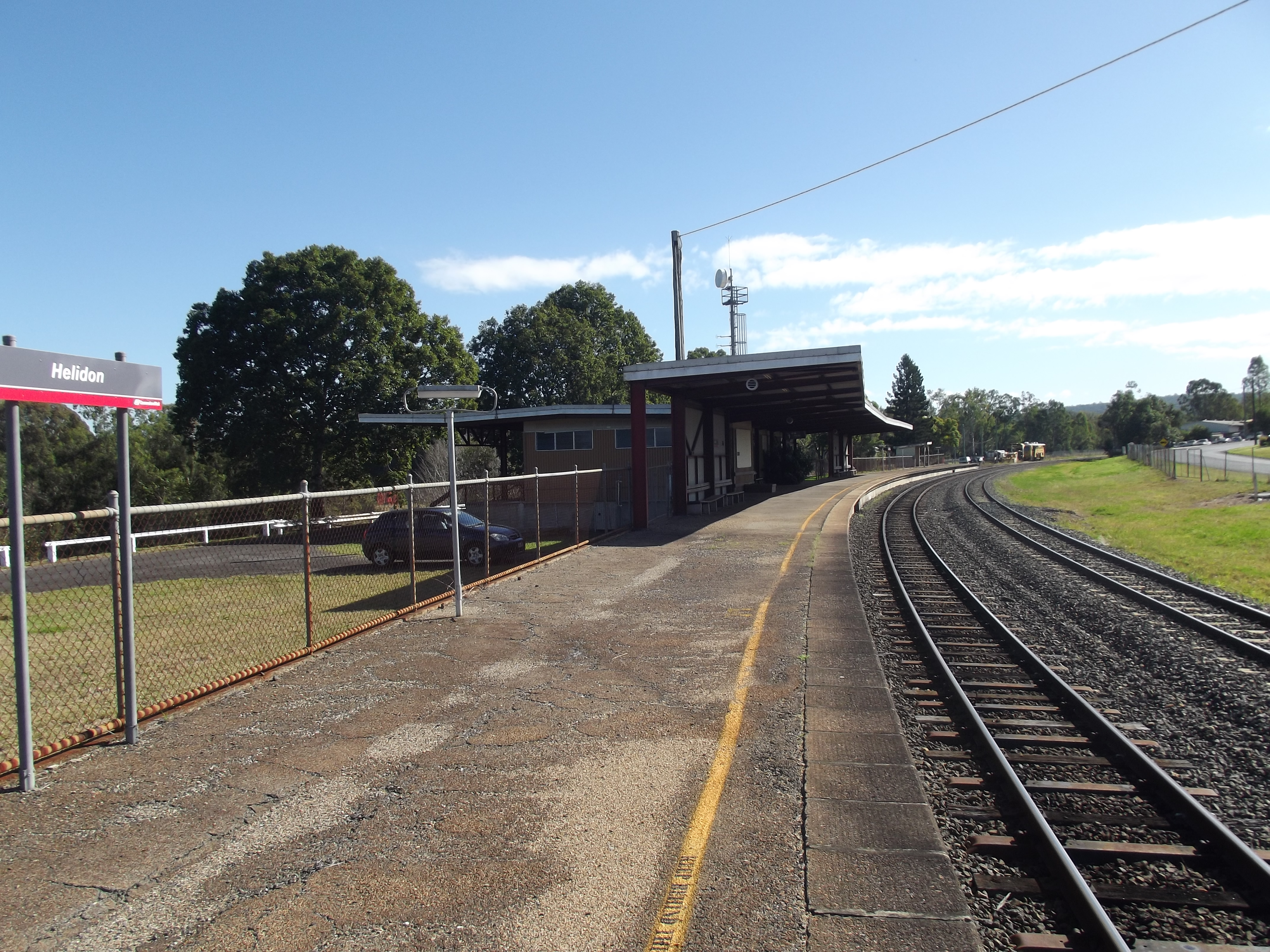
- Westbound view in July 2013 looking towards Toowoomba

General information
- Location: Turner Street, Helidon
- Coordinates: 27.5480°S 152.1231°E
- Owner: Queensland Rail
- Operator: Traveltrain
- Line: Main
- Distance: 115.27 kilometres from Central
- Platforms: 1
- Tracks: 2

Construction
- Structure type: Ground

History
- Opened: 1866

Services
Preceding station	Queensland Rail	Following station
Gatton towards Brisbane	The Westlander	Toowoomba towards Charleville
Former services
Grantham towards Brisbane	Main Line railway	Lockyer towards Toowoomba
Location

Helidon railway station is located on the Main line in Queensland, Australia. It serves the town of Helidon in the Lockyer Valley Region. The station has one platform with a passing loop, opening in 1866.

== History ==
An 1891 Railway Tourist Guide says this of Helidon Station:

"Thence across open forest flats and rolling ridges with red box gums, silver leaf ironbark, and apple tree; ranges showing in the background to the north and south, until the arrival at Helidon, 72 miles from Brisbane at 462 feet altitude. Here is a well-appointed refreshment room where the traveler can obtain a regular lunch, or sandwiches, tea, coffee, milk or any hotel beverage at the bar. Two miles from here is the Helidon Spa water spring"

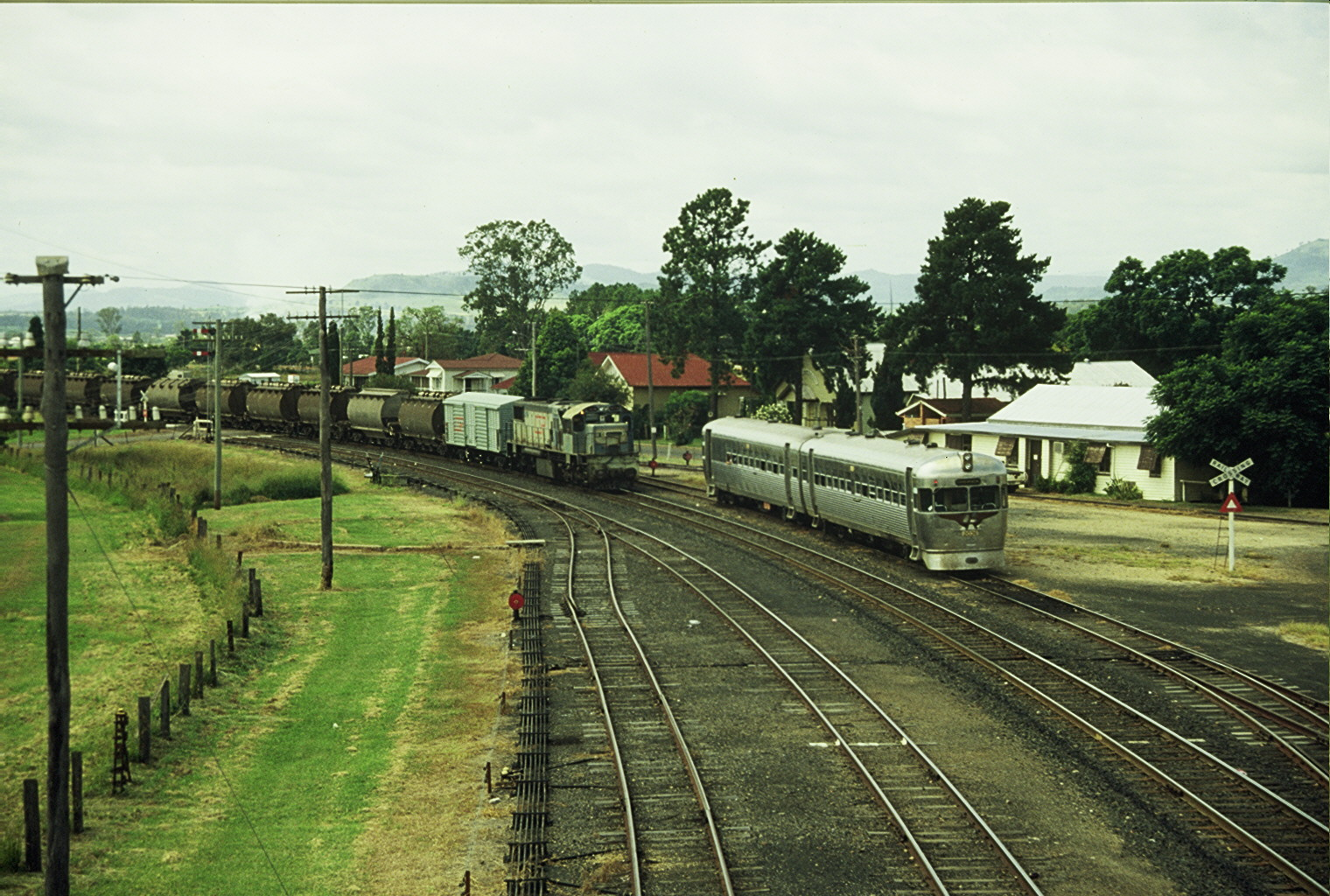
1550 class locomotive and 2000 class rail motors at Helidon in 1987.

== Services ==
It is also a timetabled stop for Queensland Rail Travel's twice weekly Westlander services:

- 3S86 (Roma Street - Charleville) stops here at 9:30pm on Tuesdays and Thursdays
- 3987 (Charleville - Roma Street) stops here at 8:40am on Thursdays and Saturdays
