= Laidley railway station =

Railway station in Queensland, Australia

Laidley
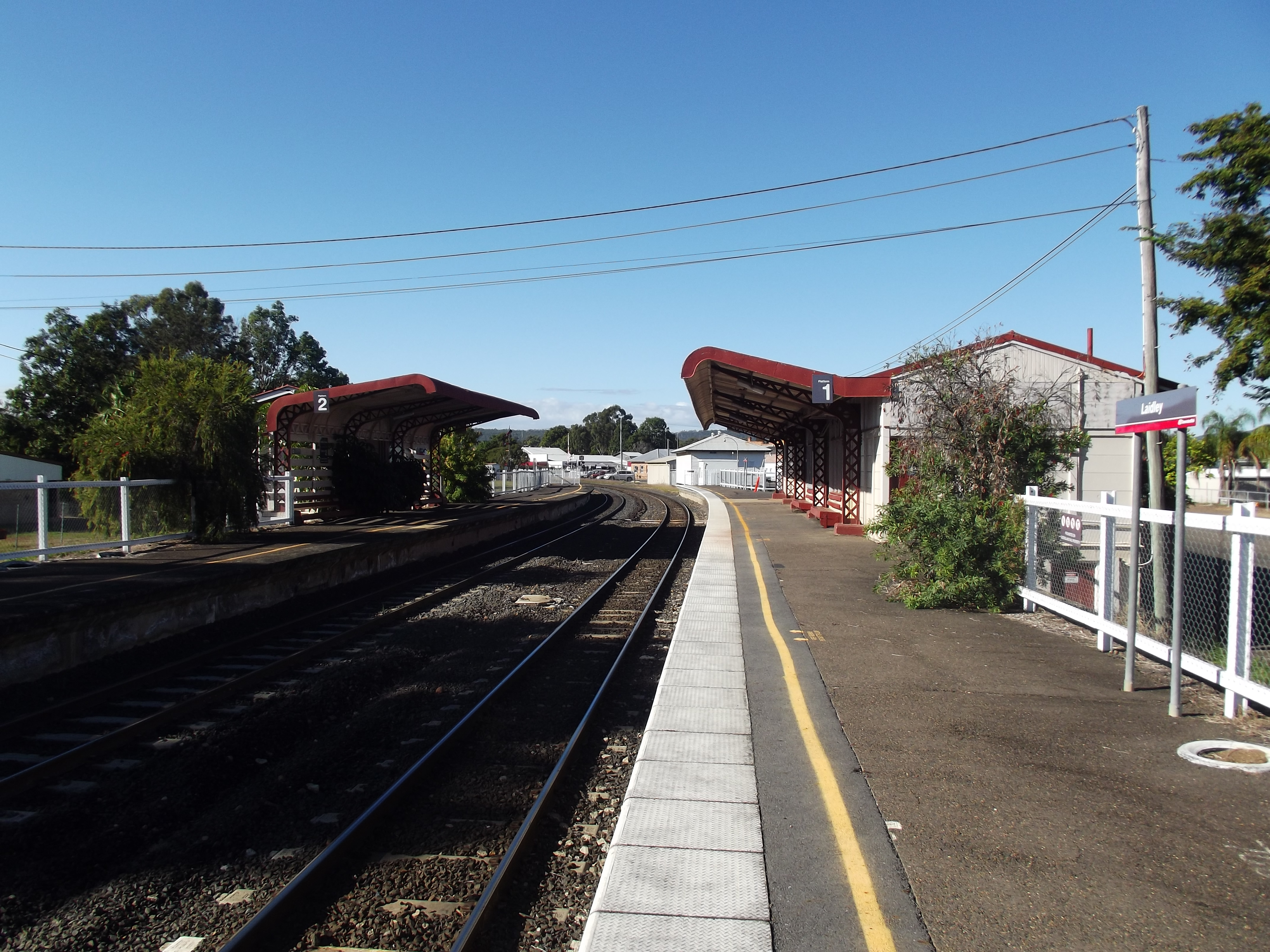
- Eastbound view from Platform 1 in July 2013

General information
- Location: Pike Street, Laidley
- Coordinates: 27.6283°S 152.3932°E
- Owner: Queensland Rail
- Operator: Traveltrain
- Line: Main
- Distance: 82.43 kilometres from Central
- Platforms: 2 side
- Tracks: 2

Construction
- Structure type: Ground

History
- Opened: 1866

Services
| Preceding station | Queensland Rail | Following station |
|---|---|---|
| Rosewood towards Brisbane | The Westlander | Gatton towards Charleville |
Former service
| Yarongmulu towards Brisbane | Main Line railway | Forest Hill towards Toowoomba |
Location

Laidley railway station is a railway station, located on the Main line in Queensland, Australia. It serves the town of Laidley. The station has two side platforms, opening in 1866.

== Services ==
Laidley is served by Queensland Rail Travel's twice weekly Westlander service travelling between Brisbane and Charleville.

== Transport links ==
Laidley Bus Services operates one bus route via Laidley station:

- 539: Helidon to Rosewood station service
