= Toowoomba railway station =

Toowoomba
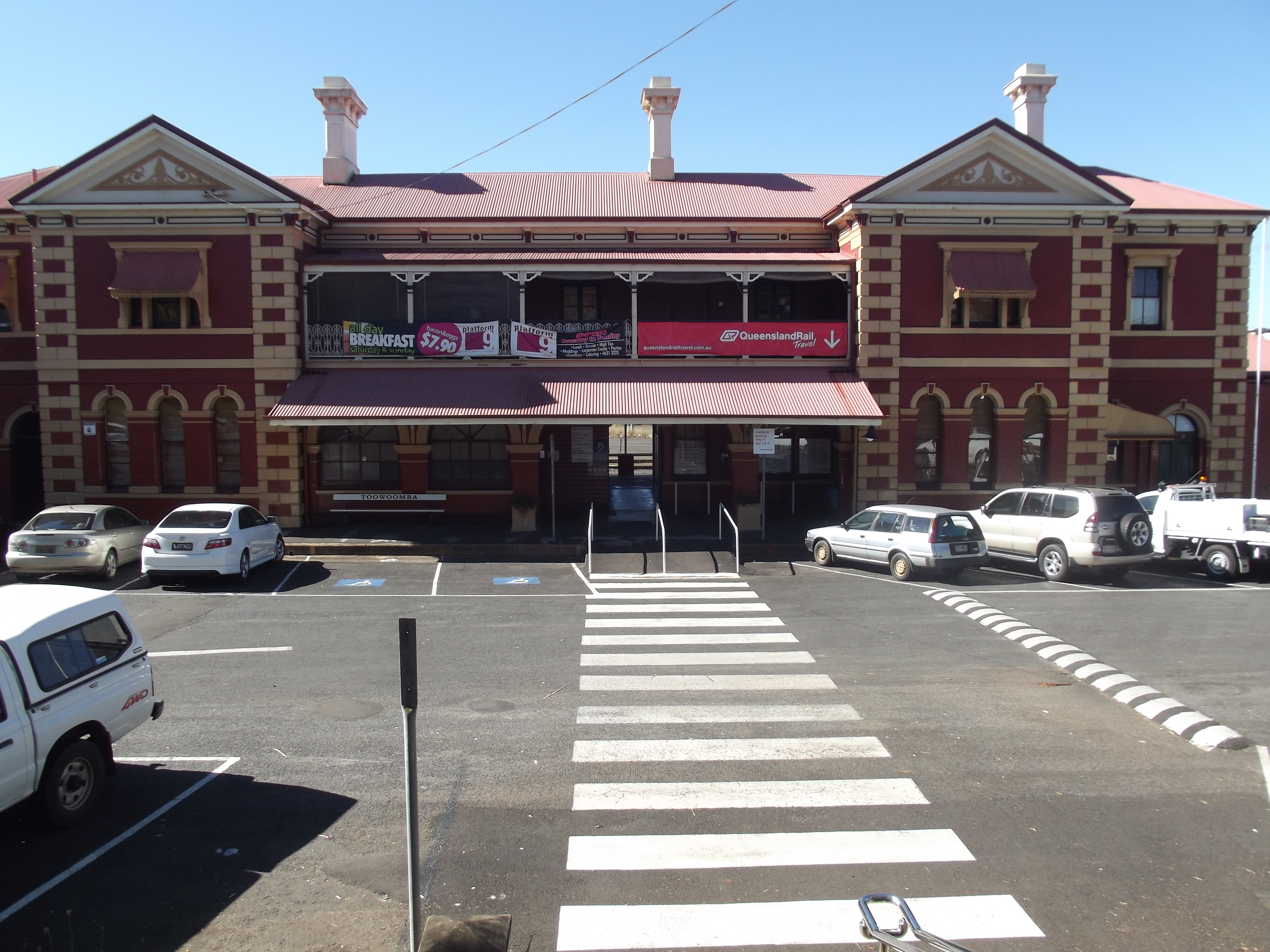
- Station front in July 2013

General information
- Location: Railway Street, Toowoomba
- Coordinates: 27.5574°S 151.9517°E
- Owner: Queensland Rail
- Operator: Traveltrain
- Lines: Western; Main; Southern
- Distance: 162.04 kilometres from Central
- Platforms: 2 (1 side, 1 bay)
- Tracks: 4

Construction
- Structure type: Ground
- Accessible: Yes

History
- Opened: 1867

Services
Preceding station	Queensland Rail	Following station
Helidon towards Brisbane	The Westlander	Oakey towards Charleville
Location

Toowoomba railway station
- Location within Queensland
- 27.5557°S 151.952°E
- Location: Russell Street, Toowoomba, Toowoomba Region, Queensland, Australia

History
- Design period: 1870s–1890s (late 19th century)
- Built: 1873–1950s circa

Site notes
- Architect: FDG Stanley

Queensland Heritage Register
- Official name: Toowoomba Railway Station, Honour Board and Railway Yard Structures
- Type: state heritage (built)
- Designated: 21 October 1992
- Reference no.: 600872
- Significant period: 1870s–1930s (historical); 1873–ongoing (social)
- Significant components: air raid shelter, railway refreshment room/s, furniture/fittings, residential accommodation – workers' quarters, railway station, yard, views from, office/s, shed – goods, store/s / storeroom / storehouse, crane / gantry, weighbridge/weigh station, platform canopies/awnings (railway), machinery/plant/equipment – transport – rail, shed/s, views to, out building/s, switch room, pit – brake examination (railway), signal box/signal cabin/switch house/mechanical points (rail), platform, pit – machinery, memorial – honour board/ roll of honour, rest room/retiring room/powder room
- Builders: Richard Godsall

Toowoomba railway station is a heritage-listed railway station on the Western line at Russell Street, Toowoomba, Toowoomba Region, Queensland, Australia. It serves the city of Toowoomba, which is the junction for the Western, Main and Southern lines. The station has one platform with a passing loop, opening in 1867. It was designed by FDG Stanley and built in 1873 by Richard Godsall. It was added to the Queensland Heritage Register on 21 October 1992.

== Services ==
Toowoomba is served by Queensland Rail Travel's twice weekly Westlander service travelling between Brisbane and Charleville.

Following the cessation of the Dirranbandi Mail in February 1993, the cessation of the Roma to Brisbane Rail motor in December 1993 and the diversion of The Westlander to call at Willowburn in August 1994, Toowoomba was served by no regular passenger services.

This was redressed when The Westlander reverted to calling at the station from 8 April 1997.

== Transport links ==
Toowoomba station is served by Bus Queensland Toowoomba services.

It is also a timetabled stop for Queensland Rail Travel's twice weekly Westlander services:

- 3S86 (Roma Street to Charleville) stops here on Tuesdays and Thursdays
- 3987 (Charleville to Roma Street) stops here on Thursdays and Saturdays

== History ==
Toowoomba railway station represents an important site in the study of the railway network of Queensland. As the focal point of one of the major railway routes in Queensland the Toowoomba station has reflected the growth and decline of railway passenger traffic in Queensland. Conceived originally as an imposing two-storeyed structure the Toowoomba station was designed by Sir Charles Fox in England in mid-1866. As designed the building was to be prefabricated in England and shipped to Queensland. It was anticipated that this building would act as the administrative centre for the railways centred on Toowoomba.

After the collapse of the Agra Bank in 1866, this contract was cancelled and a replacement structure erected instead. This was of a similar design to Laidley railway station. The building rapidly outgrew its usefulness and in 1871 the decision was taken to construct a new station. Delays occurred, but by March 1873, Richard Godsall of Toowoomba, was awarded the contract. This building designed by FDG Stanley, the Queensland Colonial Architect, was eventually handed over on 26 October 1874. As designed by Stanley and built, it was the first masonry station building to be erected in the Queensland country area.

The original station design featured a refreshment-dining room area but by the turn of the century it was apparent that larger facilities would be required. Construction of a new Railway Refreshment Room Wing began in 1901, and was completed in 1902. Two major extensions were added on to these facilities; the Tea Room in 1915 and two extensions in the Dining Room area in 1920 and 1926.

A further addition was made to catering facilities c. 1937, with the provision of a kiosk. This is of interest as in 1930 the uniform gauge railway link had been opened from Kyogle to Brisbane effectively by passing Toowoomba as the interstate link.

Extensions have been made progressively to station canopies and platforms as well within the station block itself. In 1906 the platform was extended towards Russell Street, and canopies followed this extension in 1911. During this period, a wrought iron overbridge was provided for pedestrian access in 1905 at the cost of £4,000. Two subsequent extensions followed in 1937 and 1949. In 1985 the overbridge was relocated to a sports ground near Grantham.

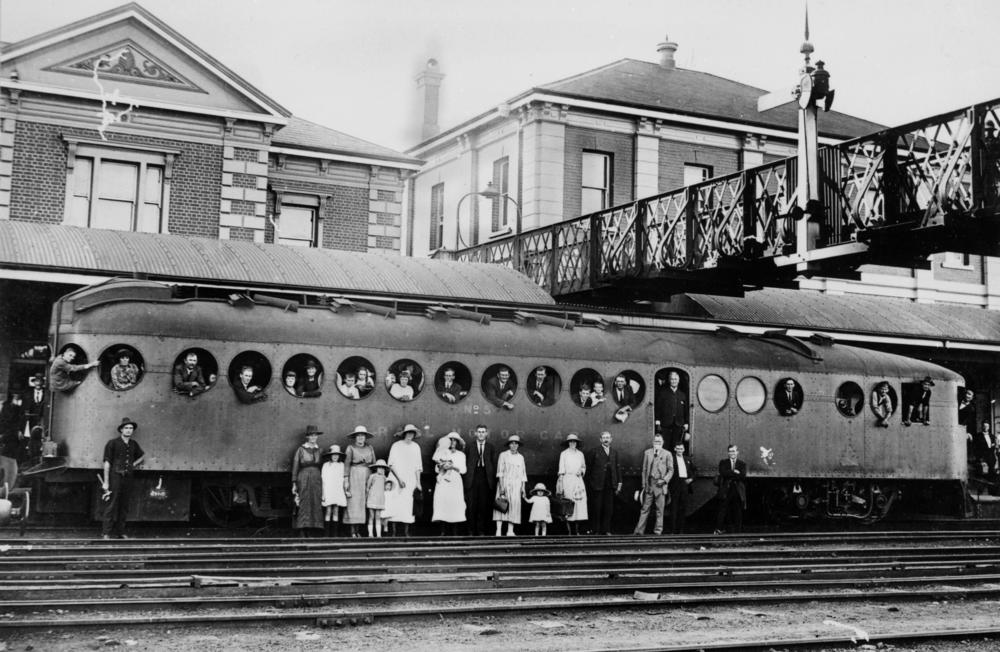
Overbridge at Toowoomba railway station, circa 1923

The station outbuildings form as important a part of the history of this station as passengers' amenities. In the period of 1908–1915 timber out buildings were provided South toward Russell St. These included parcels rooms as well as luggage rooms. Accommodation for guards and porters were provided in two smaller buildings. Of these extensions only the Guards and Porters buildings remain. Whilst of a standard design they reflect on the conditions worked under by Departmental workers.

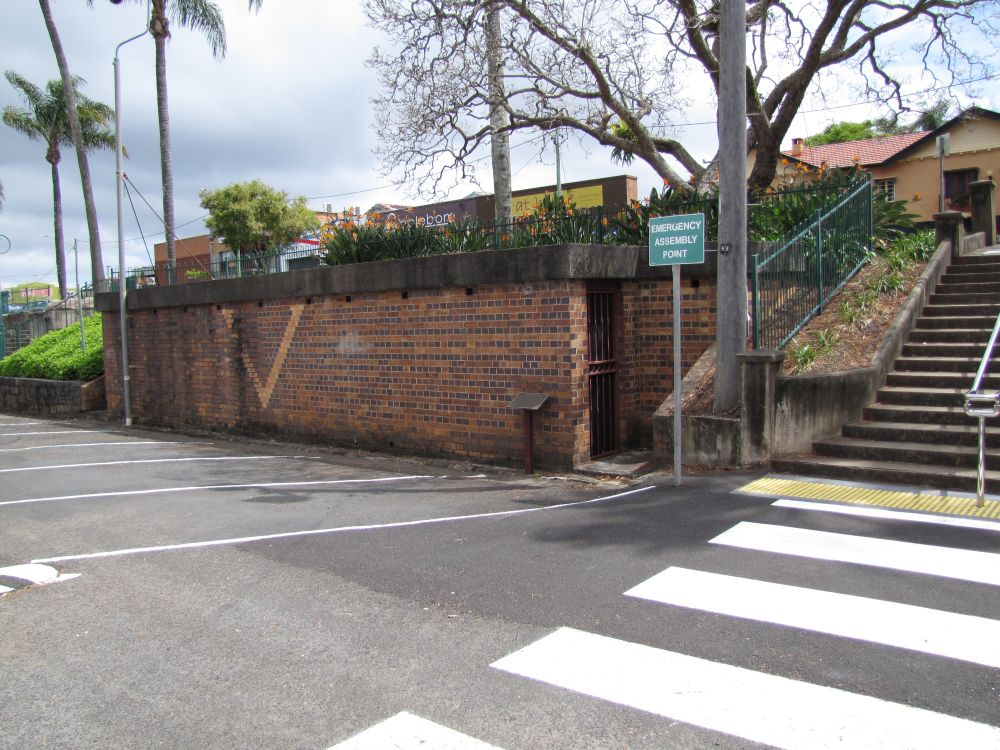
Public air raid shelter from World War II, 2012

A magnificent wooden Roll of Honour board at the north end of the station pays tribute to the role of Toowoomba railway workers in the armed services in World War I. The roll of honour was crafted at the North Ipswich railway workshops to a design by Vincent Price (the architect for Queensland Railways Department). It was unveiled by railway commissioner Charles Evans, a former Toowoomba railwayman himself. Although the criteria for inclusion for the first 209 names added in 1918 was stated to be "railway employees within a radius extending from Helidon to Toowoomba, Toowoomba to Chinchilla, Toowoomba to Clifton, and adjacent branch lines", the final list of 559 names reflects a far wider geographical area.

The station also has two WWII air raid shelters: one near the Honour Board built as protection for railway employees; the second lies outside the main station entrance and was constructed to protect the general public from bomb splinters.

Part of the present assistant station-masters office comprises the Toowoomba B signal cabin, one of two in the Toowoomba yard. It was installed during the 1950s to replace the original tower cabin B. Although now disconnected (May 1993) the interior of this cabin illustrates older methods of safeworking and train control now superseded by automatic signalling.

A series of ancillary structures and servicing facilities evidence the development of the station environment. The Watering Crane standing alongside the tracks was originally used as a water replenishing point for steam locomotives. Worker's huts and accommodation are also located within the yard; it is possible that both of these structures were erected in the 1920s as part of the station yard re- organisation. These huts at present are in use as accommodation as shunters and train examiners shelters. At the Eastern edge of the shunting yard a mechanical balance scale is still extant, housed in a weighbridge shelter shed. The weighbridge balance scale bears a foundry plate marker on it. Slide balances were used to measure wagon weights for train marshalling.

The Westinghouse brake examination pit and shed, possibly constructed c. 1900 is also located in the outer areas of the yard. The brake inspection pit appears to be constructed of local bricks. This is unusual as most surviving locomotive/carriage inspection pits tend to be of concrete construction. Of particular significance is the checkboard placed on wall of interior of this shed, listing passenger car brake examinations and overhaul dates. Most vehicles listed have now been withdrawn or disposed of as railway items.

Also associated with signalling and safeworking in the Toowoomba yard is the A signal cabin, taken out of use mid-1993. This cabin possibly dates from the 1920s. The cabin interior is still intact, and includes signal levers, safeworking instruments and Toowoomba yard diagram. Associated with this structure are the now dismantled semaphore signals from the signal gantry.

The Toowoomba Goods Shed dates from 1896, although a smaller goods shed was constructed with the 1867 structure. Plans had been prepared for this replacement shed as early as 1884, the new plans called for a shed 250 by 75 feet (76 by 23 m) of timber and galvanised iron on pile foundations with two 150-by-15-foot (45.7 by 4.6 m) platforms and two 5 ton cranes.

The artefacts and structures listed above all form an important role in providing an overview of the working environment not only of the station, but also of the railway yards themselves. They are significant because they add to the understanding of both the station as a separate entity, and as a fully operational working railway environment.

In 2017, the railway refreshment rooms have been refurbished and now operate as the Inbound Toowoomba brasserie.

== Description ==
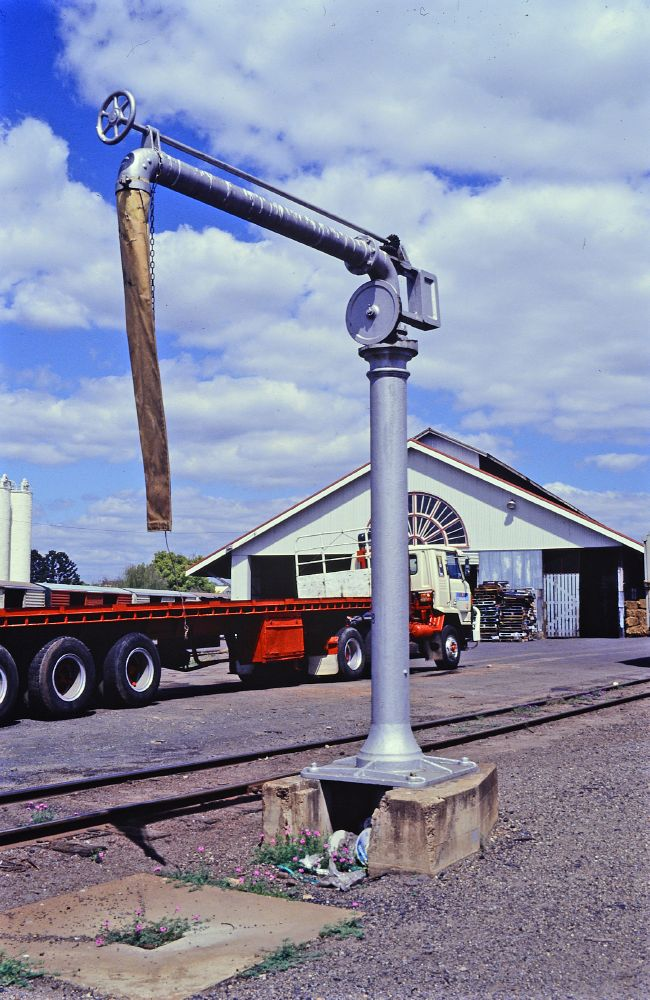
Water crane, 1993

The Toowoomba Railway Station, Honour Board and Railway Yard Structures complex is located on Railway Street, within walking proximity of the Toowoomba town centre. The Railway Station complex comprises the main station building, awnings and outbuildings, and several yard structures. The station building consists of adjoining two-storeyed rendered masonry buildings with single storeyed annexes and outbuildings with corrugated iron roofs. The buildings line the edge of a concrete platform, which is covered with corrugated iron canopies, and which extends out beyond the main buildings to the north and the south. The buildings comprise the central Station Building (1874) connecting to the Railway Refreshment Room Wing (1902), the Tea Room extension (1915) and Honour Roll pavilion (1918) to the north, and annexes and platform outbuildings to the south. The yard structures, located to the north-east of the station building, include a substantial corrugated iron and timber Goods Shed, a two-storeyed signalling shed known as Cabin A, modest timber and corrugated iron structures associated with maintenance and worker accommodation, the brick Westinghouse Brake Examination pit and corrugated iron shelter, a wagon weighbridge and timber shelter, and a cast iron water crane. The complex also includes two WWII bomb shelters.

The Toowoomba Railway Station contains intact evidence of its growth, development and workings in its Station Building, Refreshment Room Wing, Goods Shed, annexes, platform outbuildings, Honour Roll, canopies, and yard structures It also contains finely detailed architectural elements in the exteriors of the Station Building and Refreshment Room Wing, the Honour Roll, and Refreshment Room interior, furnishings and fittings.

=== The Station Building ===
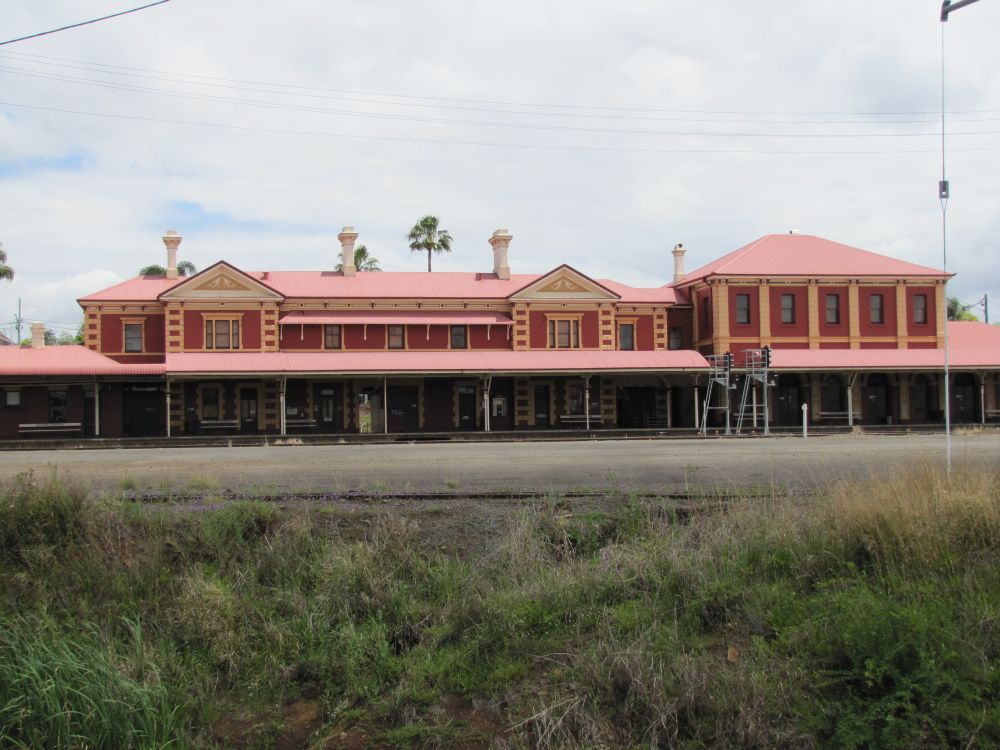
Toowoomba Railway Station (platform side), 2012

The Station Building (1874) is a substantial symmetrical building with an elongated rectangular plan with gabled bays to the east and west, and hipped roofs to the north and south. The building is finely detailed externally: the corners have pilasters formed by projecting quoins; floor and sill levels are articulated with string courses; the western ground floor openings have arched heads with keystones framed by continuous mouldings, and include a wide arch over a centrally placed entrance to the platform; the eastern ground floor windows have square heads and projecting quoins; the upper floor windows are framed with scrolled brackets supporting moulded projecting heads; the cornice has dentils and the gable ends have cartouches. Later alterations to the western elevation include concave awnings over the upper gable windows, and an enclosed timber verandah running between the two gabled bays with a corrugated iron awning projecting from the soffit. Two cast iron queuing rails are located outside ticket windows adjacent to the western entrance.

The upper floor of the Station Building contains currently disused offices, while the ground floor contains station operations rooms, offices and store areas (which are used by Aurizon and Watco Australia). Timber stairs with cast-iron balusters are located on the western side. The first floor interiors retain some vertically jointed timber-lined walls and a small timber service window. The ground floor interiors retain some masonry arches and timber columns with decorative timber capitals. The annex to the southern end contains store-rooms and toilets, including a Ladies Waiting Room of generous proportions. A small timber-lined kiosk (1936) with timber roll-down louvred shutters opening out onto the platform is located at the northern end.

=== The Railway Refreshment Room wing ===
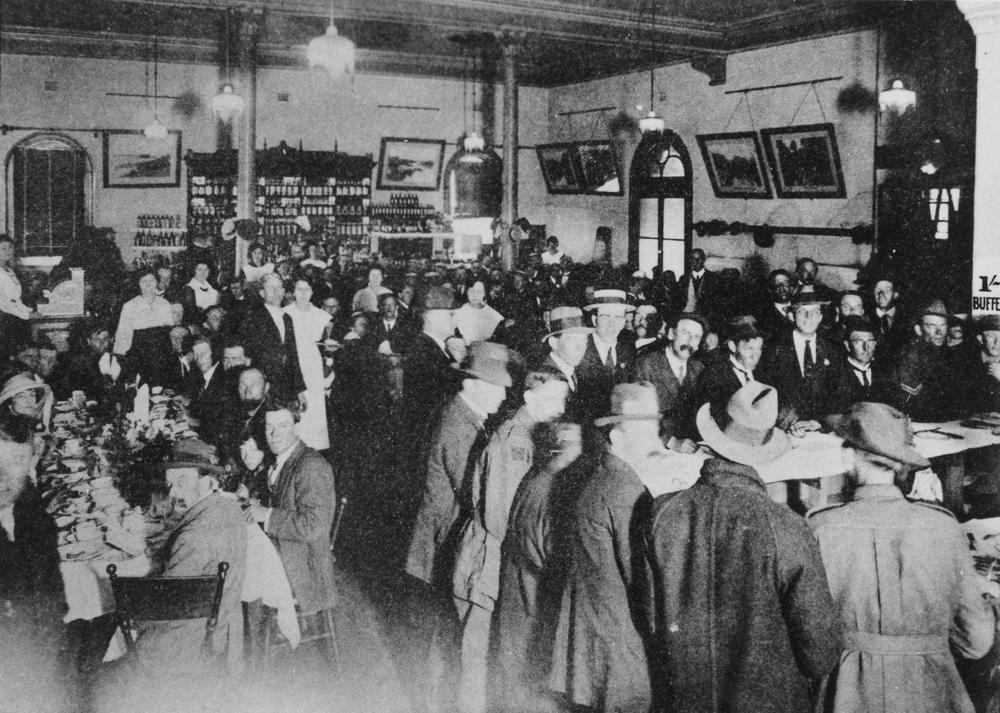
Dining room at the Toowoomba railway station, circa 1919

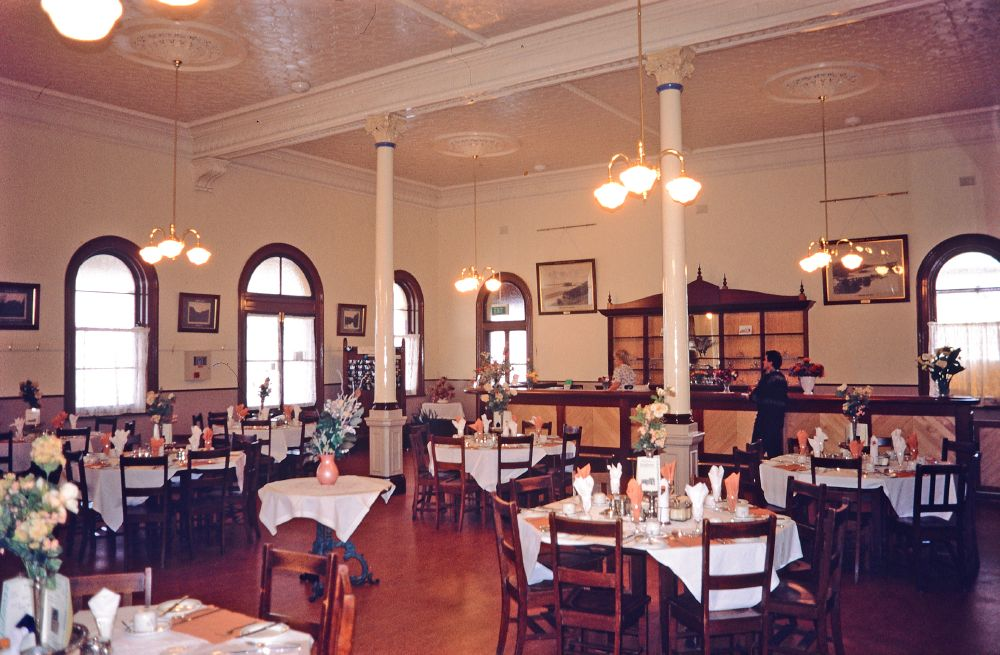
Dining room, 1998

The Railway Refreshment Room wing (1902) is a two storeyed rendered masonry L-shaped building with a single-storeyed addition to the north (1915 tearoom), and hipped corrugated roofs which rise above those of the Station Building. It contains the Railway Refreshment Room on the ground floor (which is still in operation), and offices on the upper floor. A steel and timber framed pavilion attached to the north of the dining room wing houses a fine timber Honour Roll. The building has rusticated piers at the corners, arched openings with profiled surrounds, expressed piers with decorative capitals and circular motifs at ground floor level, and windows with flat heads and keystones to the upper storeys.

The Railway Refreshment Room is a large space containing timber serveries at both ends, and round timber tables and timber chairs. The walls are decorated with large black and white photographs of local beauty spots, and the tables are set with monogrammed silverware and crockery. The interior is finely detailed with pressed metal ceilings with elaborate ceiling roses, cast iron columns with floriated capitals, and decorative pressed metal cornices and beam encasings. The adjacent Tea Room (1915 - now used as offices) also has a high pressed metal ceiling.

=== Honour Roll ===
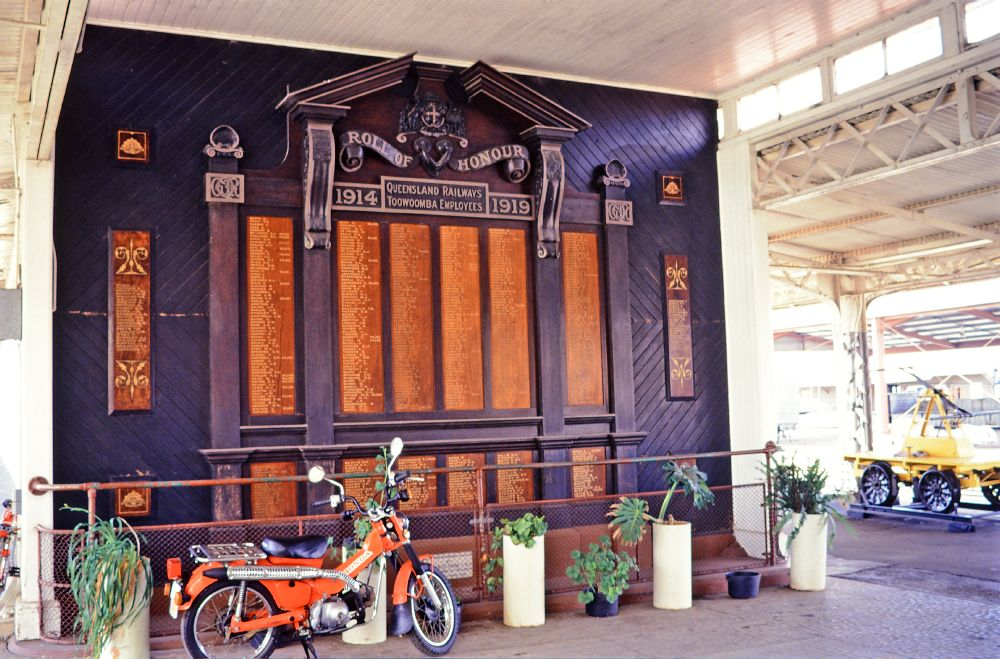
Honour Board, 1993

The finely crafted Honour Roll is housed at the northern end of a steel framed and timber pavilion with open sides. The Honour Roll is set on diagonal boarding, and has a central panel with a broken pediment on scrolled brackets, divided from side panels with pilasters. Carved into the broken pediment are the Australian Coat of Arms and the words:

Roll of Honour, 1914-1919, Queensland Railways Toowoomba Employees.

The side panels are also framed by pilasters crowned with decorative motifs of the Queensland Railways emblem, scrolls and shells. The pilasters also frame lighter timber plaques with names in gold point. The Honour Roll is flanked by smaller memorial plaques with gold lettering and motifs.

=== Platform canopies ===
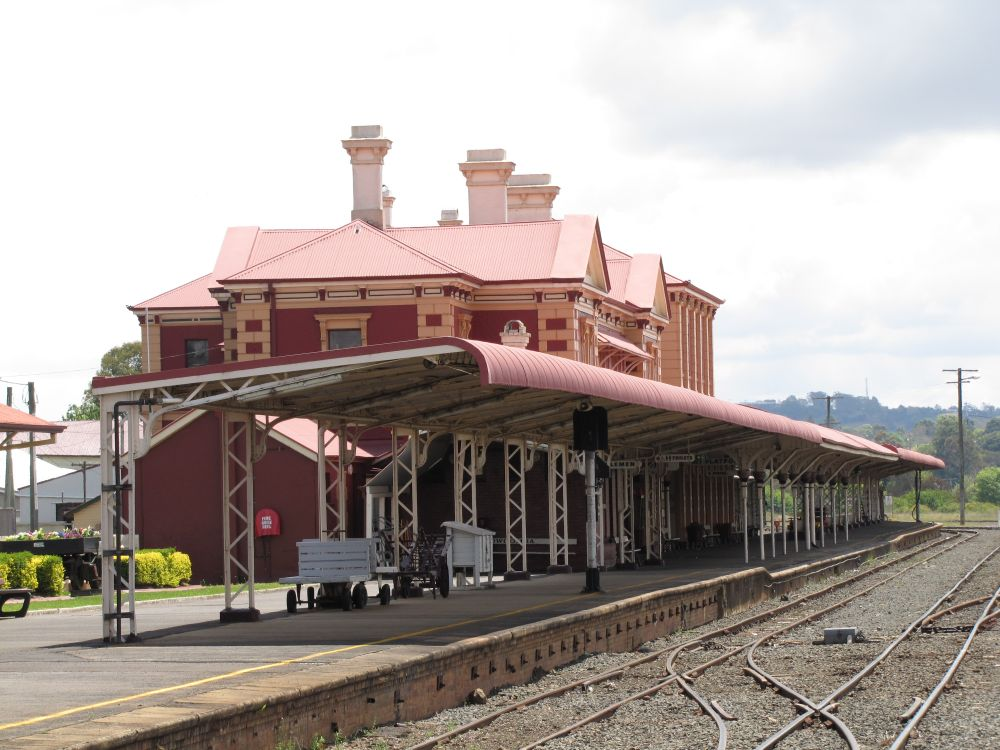
Platform canopies, 2012

The platform canopies have been constructed at different stages, in different forms and materials. The canopy attached to the Station Building and Refreshment Room Wing is framed in timber and has an arched corrugated iron roof. The roof rests on timber trusses with arched top cords and is stabilised with lateral trusses. The roof structure is supported on steel posts (which have replaced timber ones) with curved brackets and valances. Extending out to the north are two canopies with butterfly roofs on open-webbed steel frames with central supports (1910). Immediately to the south is a cantilevered canopy also on an open-webbed steel structure (c. 1911).

=== Yard structures ===
The station environment also contains intact structures associated with former railway operations.

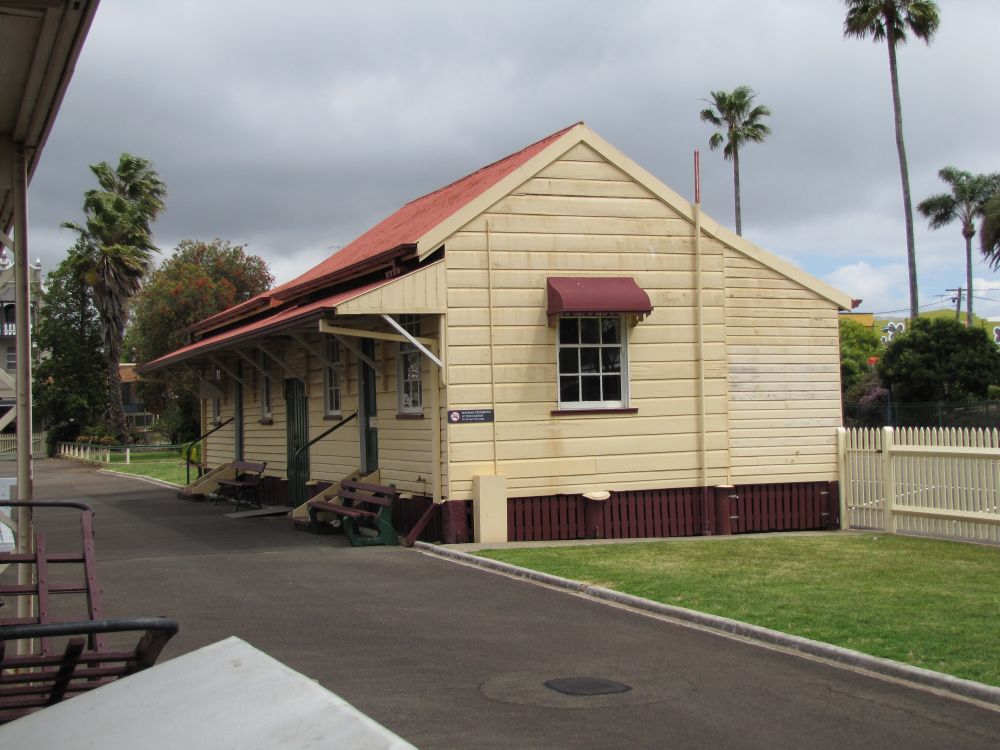
Guards and porters' huts, 2012

The Porter's Shed and Guard's Hut (1908–1915) (used by Aurizon and Watco Australia) are located to the south of the main station buildings. These modest weatherboard buildings are connected by a battened store and have pitched corrugated iron roofs with awnings supported on timber brackets.

Cabin B is a weatherboard clad room adjoining the main entry to the platform which contains intact safeworking and interlocking equipment - comprising several steel levers, a yard diagram, and electrical staff equipment with shaped red painted steel and brass encasing mounted on a concrete pedestal.

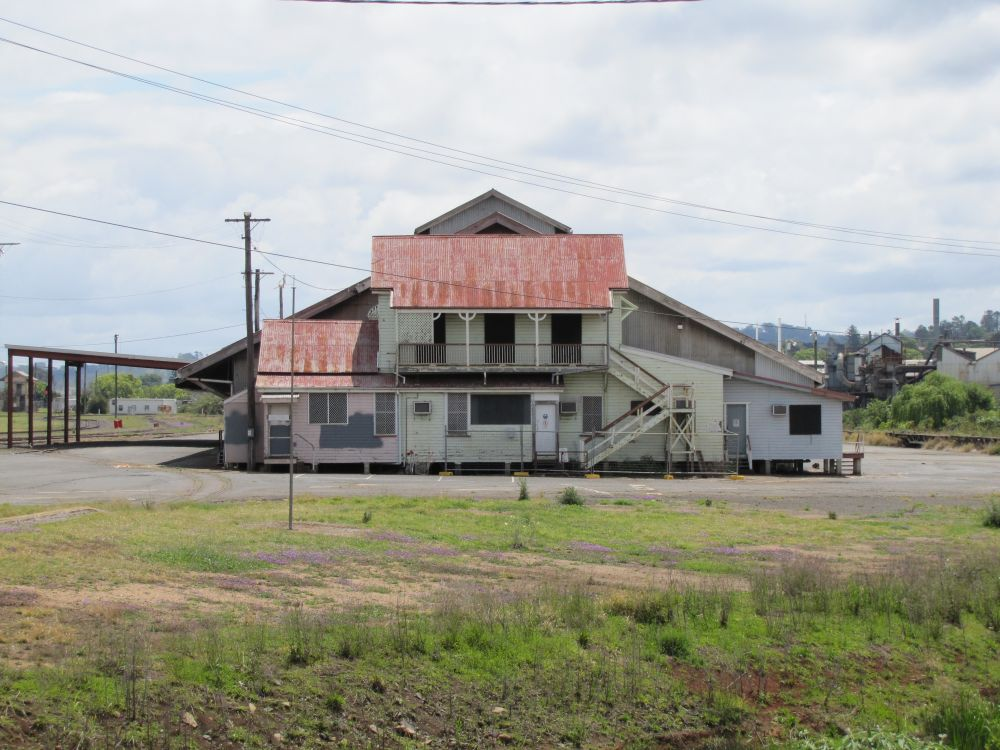
Goods shed, 2012

Located within the railway yard, The Goods Shed (1896) is a long rectangular building with substantial timber trusses and bracketed central columns. It is clad in corrugated iron and has a pitched roof with bracketed eaves and a raised central roof light. It also has timber platforms supported on large cut logs.

Also located within the railway yard is the Westinghouse Brake Examination Pit and shelter. It comprises a modest corrugated iron building with a barrel vaulted corrugated iron roof covering a long rectangular brick-lined pit. The building contains boards detailing brake examination schedules, and a workbench.

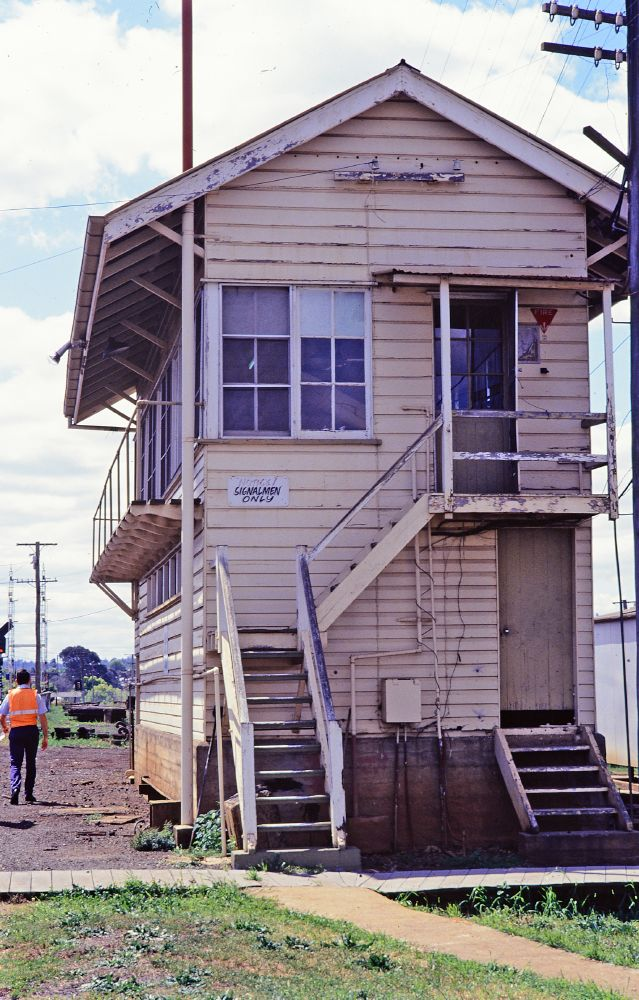
Signal Cabin A, 1993

Other yard structures include Signal Cabin A (taken out of service by Queensland Rail in mid-1993), a water crane and a wagon weighbridge. Signal Cabin A is a two-storeyed chamferboard-clad building with pitched corrugated iron roofs, a cantilevered timber catwalk overlooking the railway at first floor level. The building contains intact but disconnected mechanical signalling equipment. The first floor contains a large frame of colour-coded mechanical steel signalling levers, timber and brass track indicators, and a yard diagram. The Water Crane comprises a cast iron hollow tube surmounted by a rotating cast iron feeder arm with valve controls and a canvas tube attached, mounted on a concrete pedestal and adjacent to a concrete drain. The Wagon Weighbridge comprises a large steel scale housed in chamferboard-clad building with a pitched corrugated iron roof, and a large metal balance plate.

The station also has two WWII air raid shelters: a brick and concrete shelter adjacent to the front entry stairs on Railway Street, and a smaller concrete shelter located on the northern platform near the honour board, which was designed for the use of QR employees.

== Heritage listing ==
Toowoomba Railway Station, Honour Board and Railway Yard Structures was listed on the Queensland Heritage Register on 21 October 1992 having satisfied the following criteria.

The place is important in demonstrating the evolution or pattern of Queensland's history.

The Toowoomba Railway Station, Honour Board, and Railway Yard Structures are important in demonstrating the development in the 19th century of the first main line railway in Queensland, and the growth and decline of railway passenger traffic in Queensland. The station building, erected in 1867, is the oldest extant masonry railway station in Queensland, and the Railway Refreshment Rooms are the last remaining commercially operating public refreshment rooms at a railway station in Queensland.

The intact yard structures are evidence of the development of railway operations since the turn of the century.

The place demonstrates rare, uncommon or endangered aspects of Queensland's cultural heritage.

The Honour Roll is a rare example of a memorial element crafted in railway workshops.

The place is important in demonstrating the principal characteristics of a particular class of cultural places.

The place has a strong community association as the site of the Toowoomba railway station since 1867, and as the railway station building since 1874, and a special association with colonial architect FDG Stanley,

The place has a strong or special association with a particular community or cultural group for social, cultural or spiritual reasons.

The place has a strong community association as the site of the Toowoomba railway station since 1867, and as the railway station building since 1874, and the Queensland Government, in particular the Railway employees.
