= Main railway line =

Railway line in Queensland, Australia

Technical
- Track gauge: 1,067 mm (3 ft 6 in)
- Train protection system: ATP from Toowoomba to Ipswitch

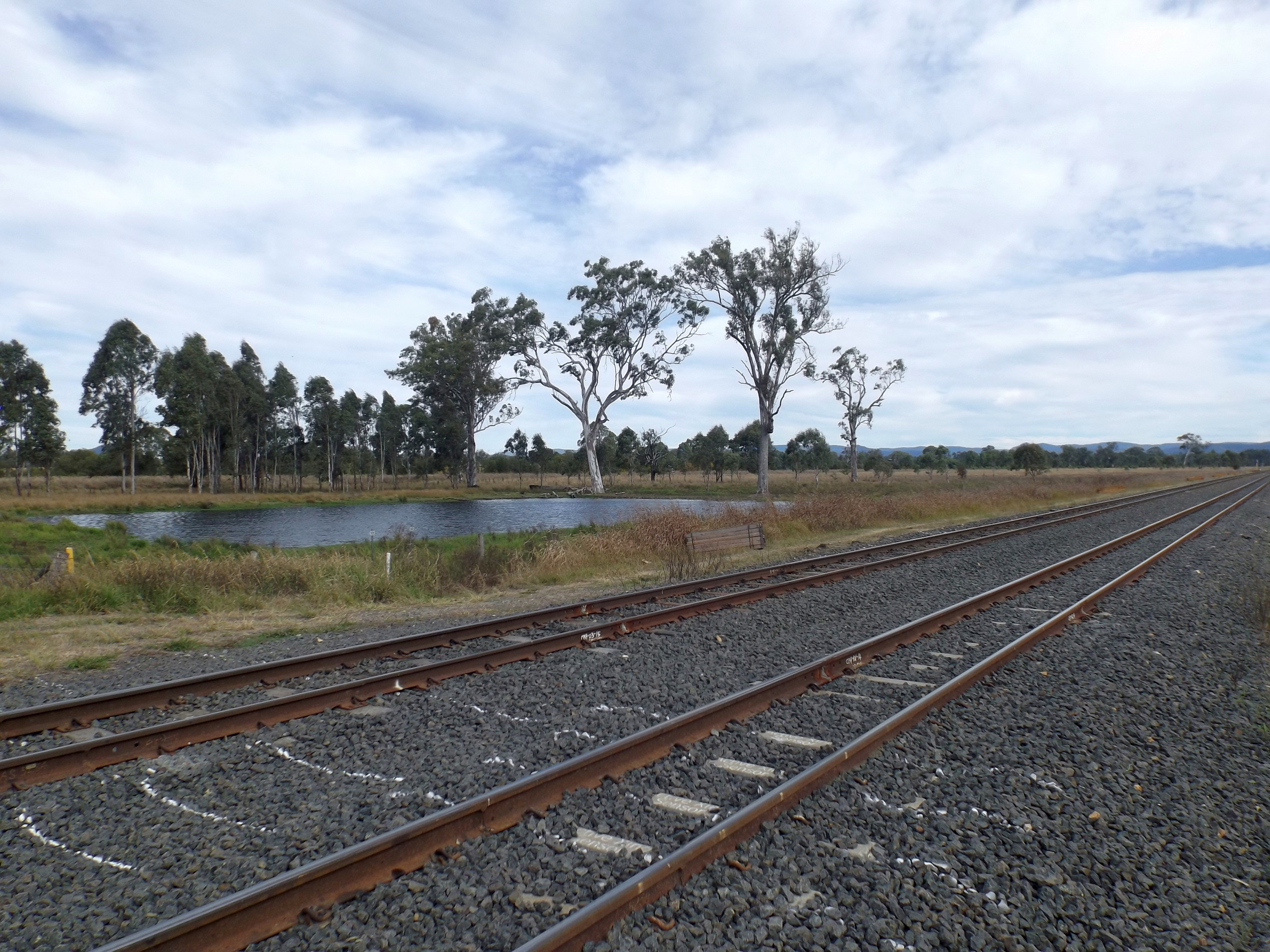
The railway at Lanefield, 2015

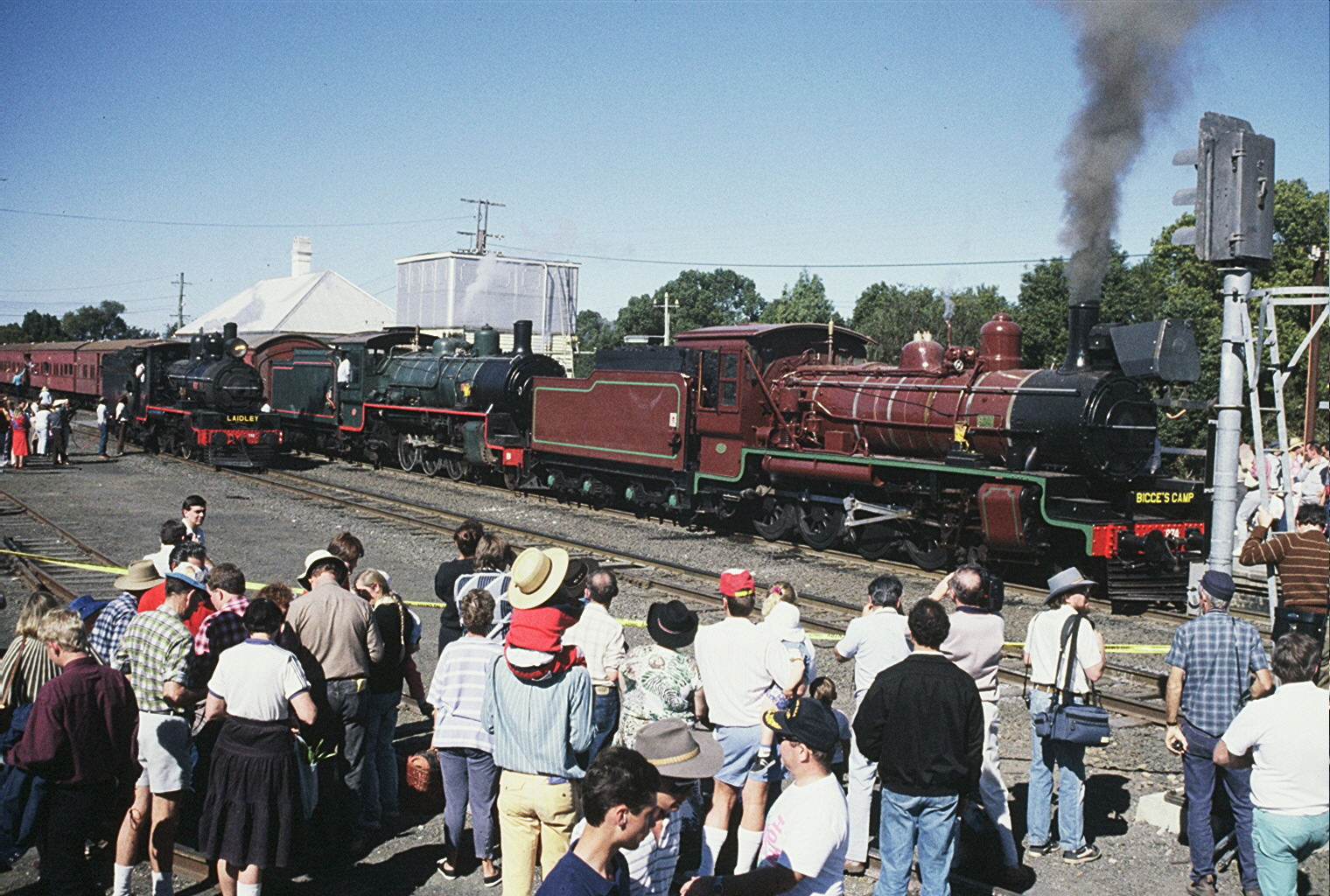
QR heritage locos of the (left to right) PB15, BB18¼ and C17 classes at Grandchester for the 125th anniversary of QR, July 1990

The Main Line is a railway line in South East Queensland, Australia. It was opened in a series of sections between 1865 and 1867. It commences at Roma St Station in the Brisbane central business district and extends 161 kilometres (100 mi) west to Toowoomba. It is the first narrow gauge main line constructed in the world. The section of the line from the end of Murphys Creek railway station to the Ruthven Street overbridge, Harlaxton is listed on the Queensland Heritage Register. The Murphys Creek Railway Complex, the Lockyer Creek Railway Bridge (Lockyer), the Lockyer Creek Railway Bridge (Murphys Creek),Swansons Rail Bridge and Bremer River Rail Bridge are also heritage listed.

== History ==
=== Ipswich to Grandchester ===
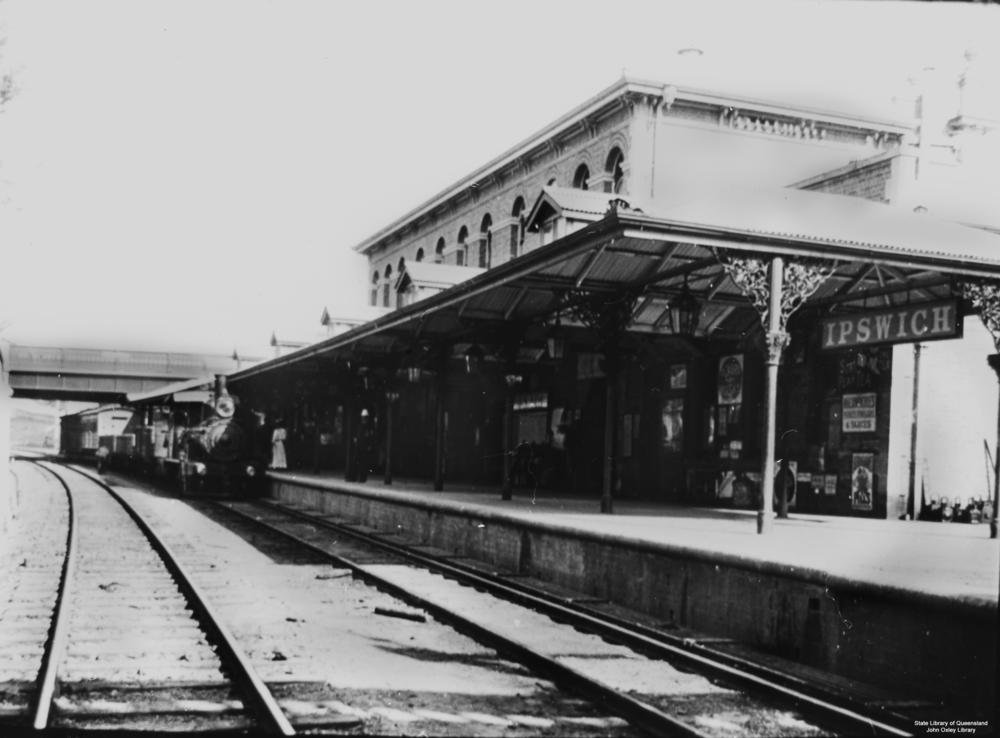
Ipswich station ~1895

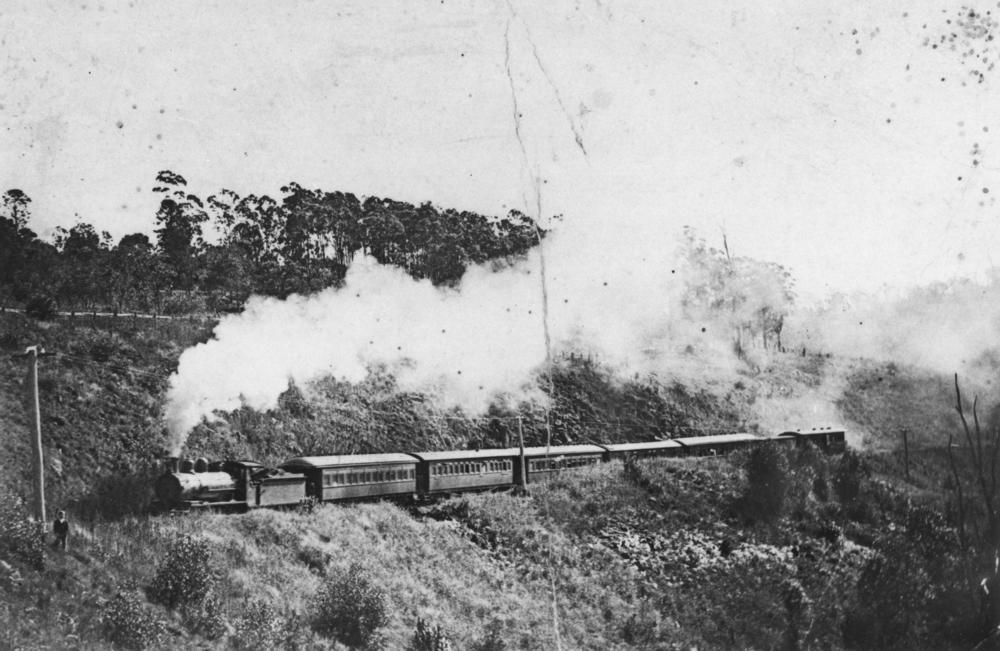
Train climbing the Main Line near Harlaxton, 1914

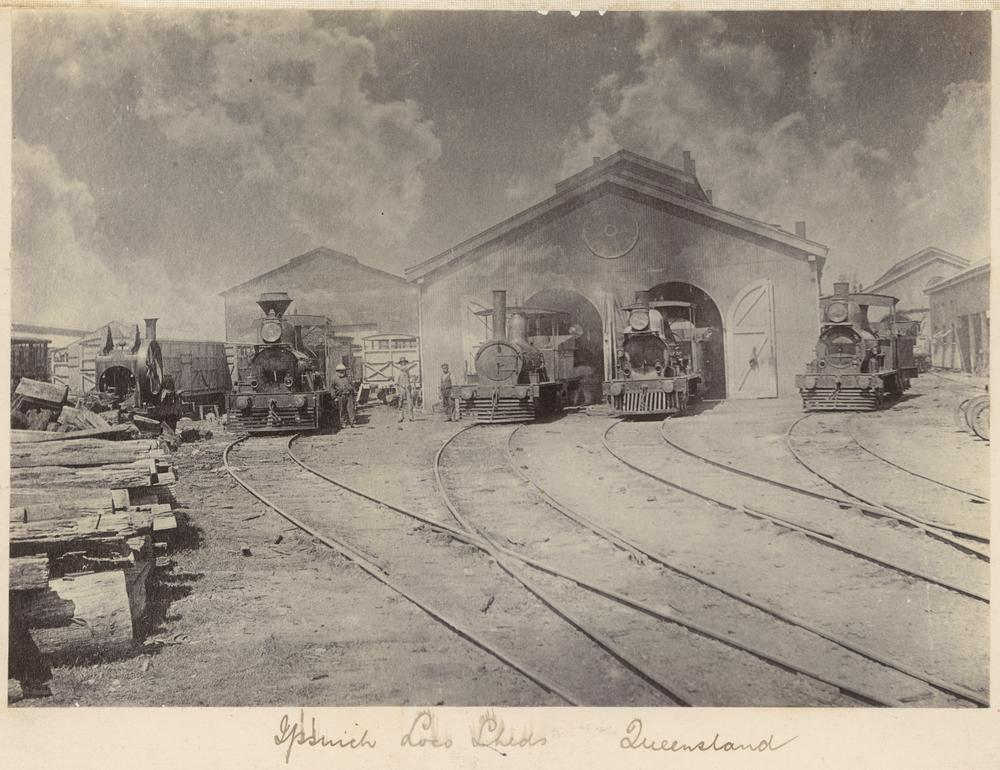
Ipswich loco sheds, ~1880

The colony of Queensland separated from New South Wales in 1859, and the new government was eager to facilitate development and immigration. As adequate river transport was already established between the capital Brisbane and Ipswich, improved transport to the fertile Darling Downs region situated west of Toowoomba was seen as a priority. As such, construction of the railway commenced from Ipswich heading west over relatively flat, easy country opened to Bigge's Camp (now Grandchester), at the eastern base of the Little Liverpool Range. The only significant engineering work for this section was the bridge over the Bremer River to North Ipswich. This first section opened on 31 July 1865, and was named the Main Line.

The line was built by the Queensland government to the unusual (for the time) gauge of 3 ft 6 in (1,067 mm); at the time this being the only narrow gauge main line in the world.

The line largely followed the alignment surveyed by a private company, the Moreton Bay Tramway Company, which had proposed to build a 4 ft 8 1/2 in (1,435 mm) standard gauge horse-drawn tramway but had been unable to raise funds to do so beyond an initial start on earthworks.

The adoption of narrow gauge was controversial at the time, and was largely predicated by the government's desire for the fastest possible construction timeframe at least cost. This resulted in adoption of sharper curves and a lower axle load than was considered possible using standard gauge, and an assessment at the time put the cost of a narrow gauge line from Ipswich to Toowoomba as 25% of the cost of a standard gauge line. In a colony with a population of ~30,000 when the decision was made, it is understandable.

=== First tunnels ===
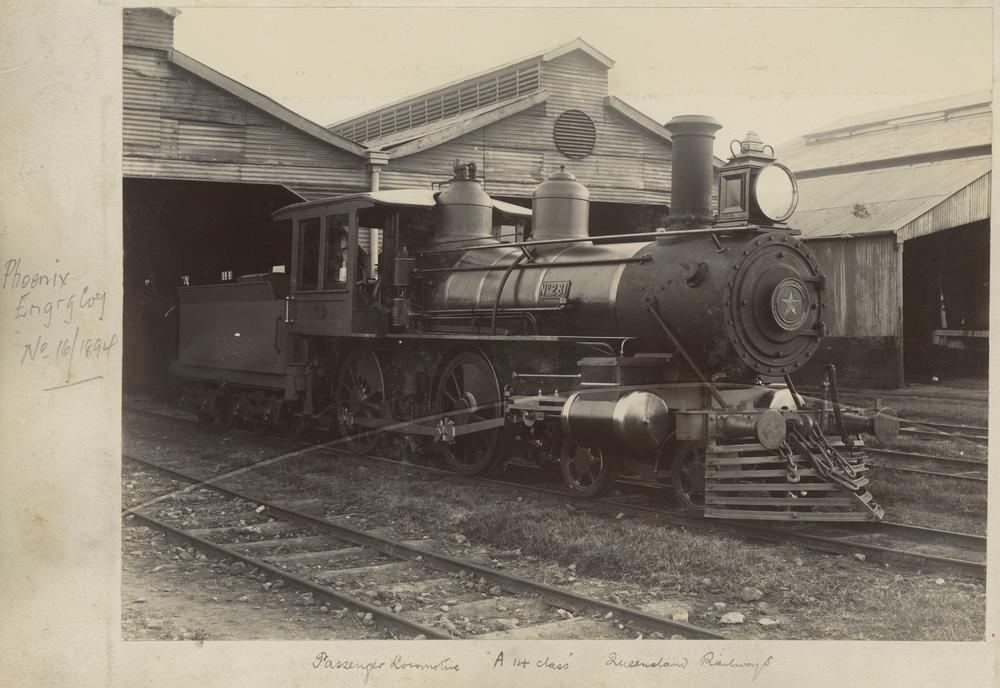
A14 281 in the locomotive sheds at Ipswich ~1890

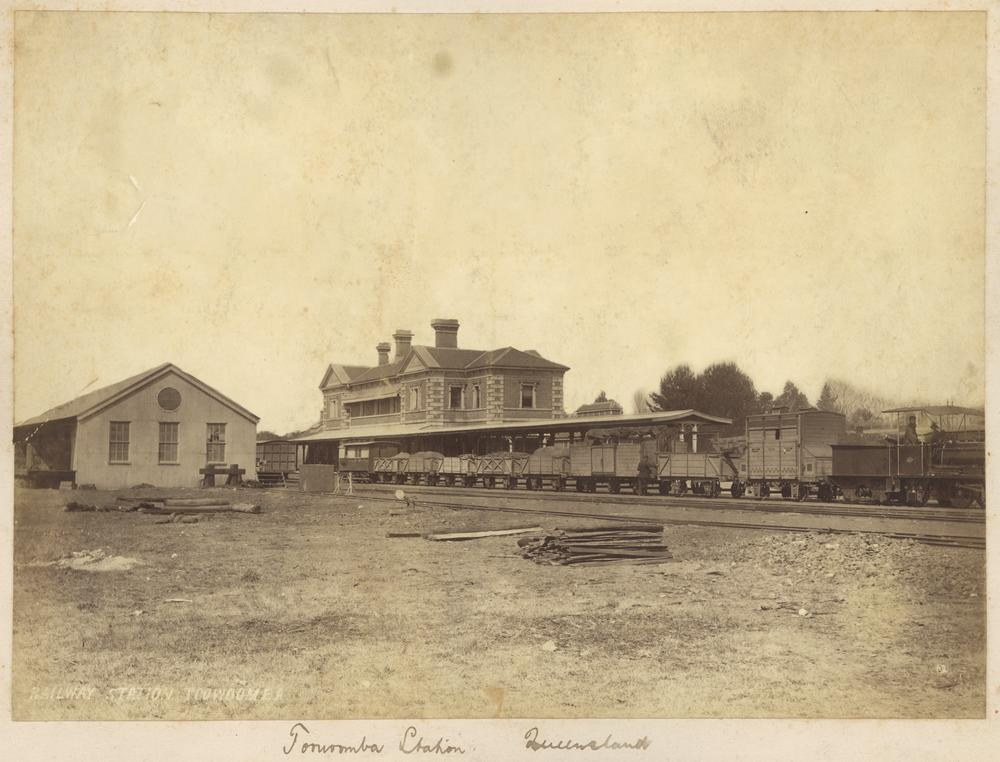
Goods train at the Toowoomba railway station ~1890

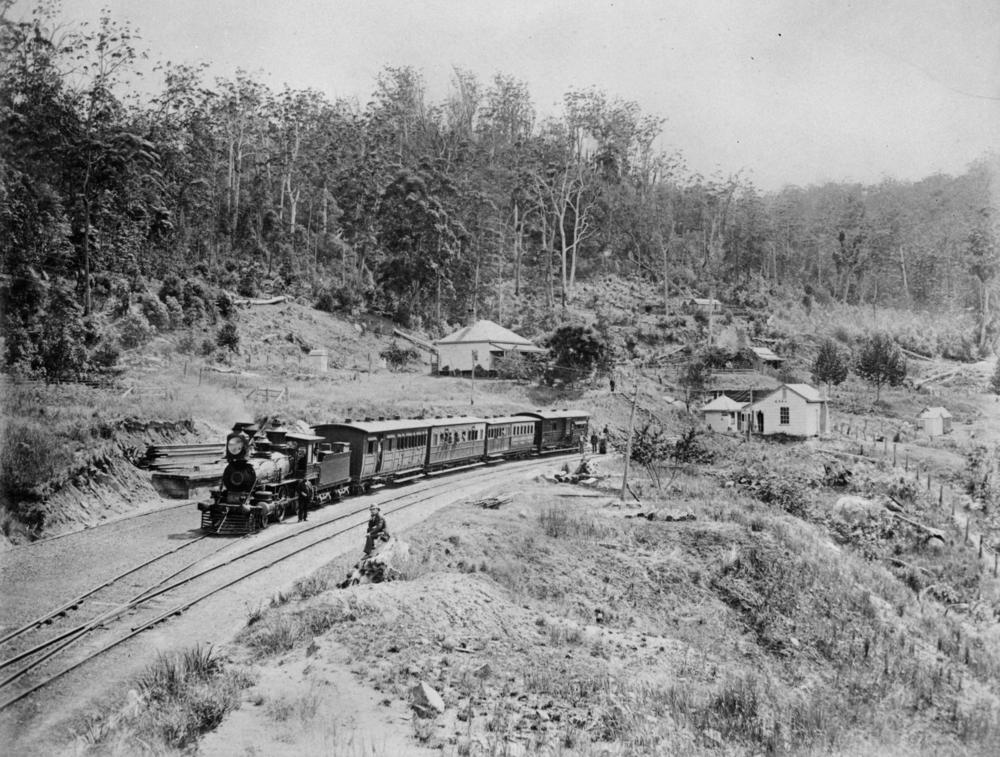
Spring Bluff station, located on the Main Line between Ipswich and Toowoomba, 1891

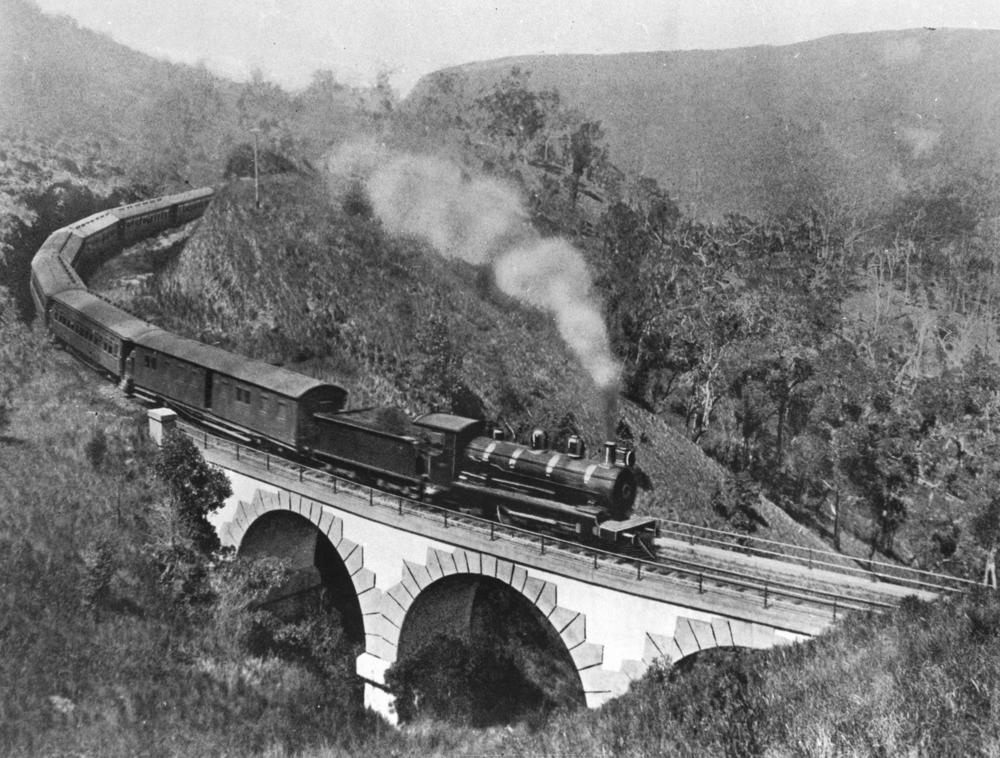
Passenger train crossing Swanson's Bridge on the Main Line, ca. 1912. The original bridge was an iron girder designed in England and supplied by Sir Charles Fox which was strengthened in 1885 and replaced by this new structure in 1900. The measurement for the bridge is 61 chains (1,200 m). The concrete surfaced masonry consists of 30 ft (9.1 m) arches, the centre one being 50 ft (15 m) high (Description supplied with photograph)

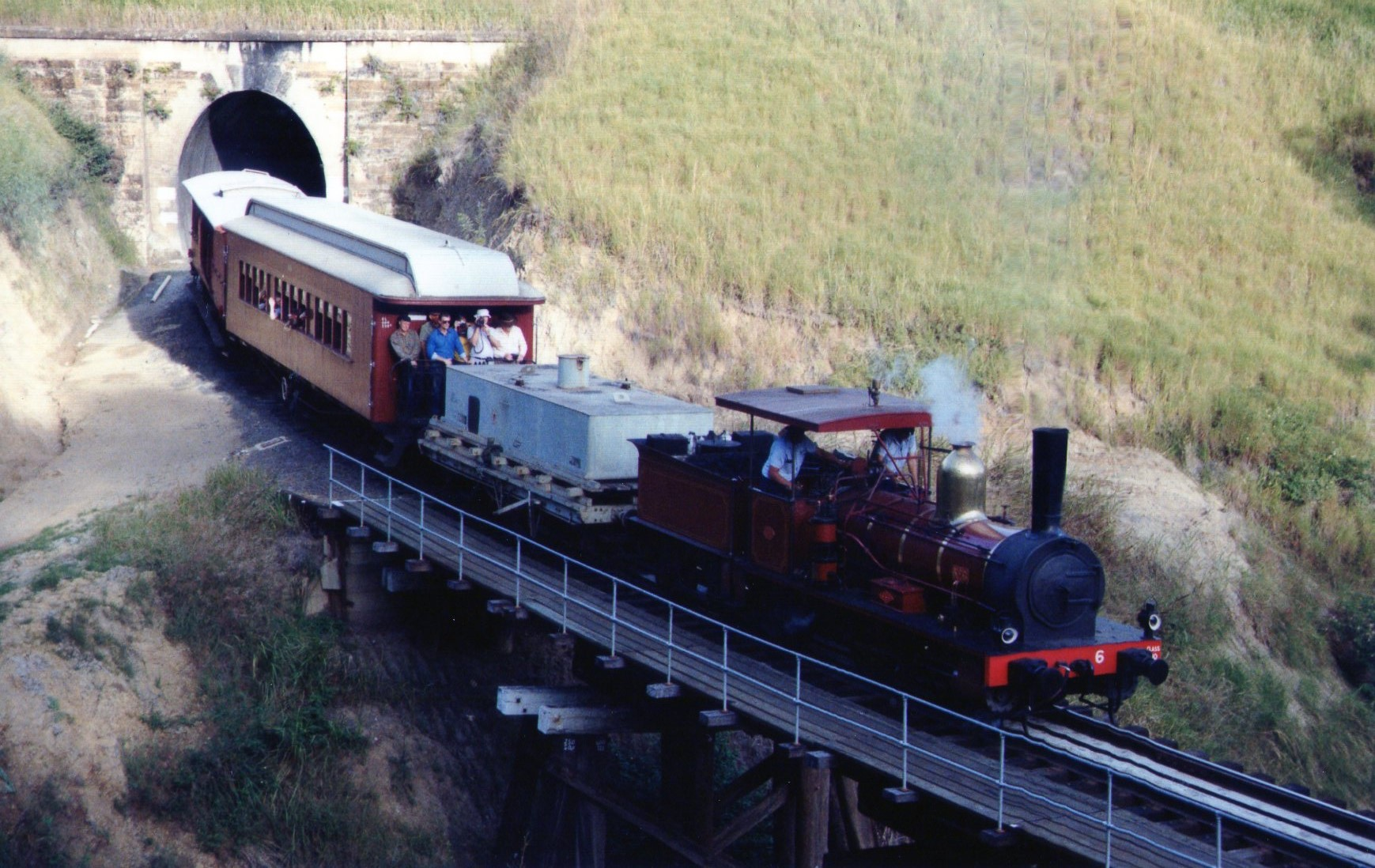
QR heritage loco A10 no. 6 on the Toowoomba Range ~1990

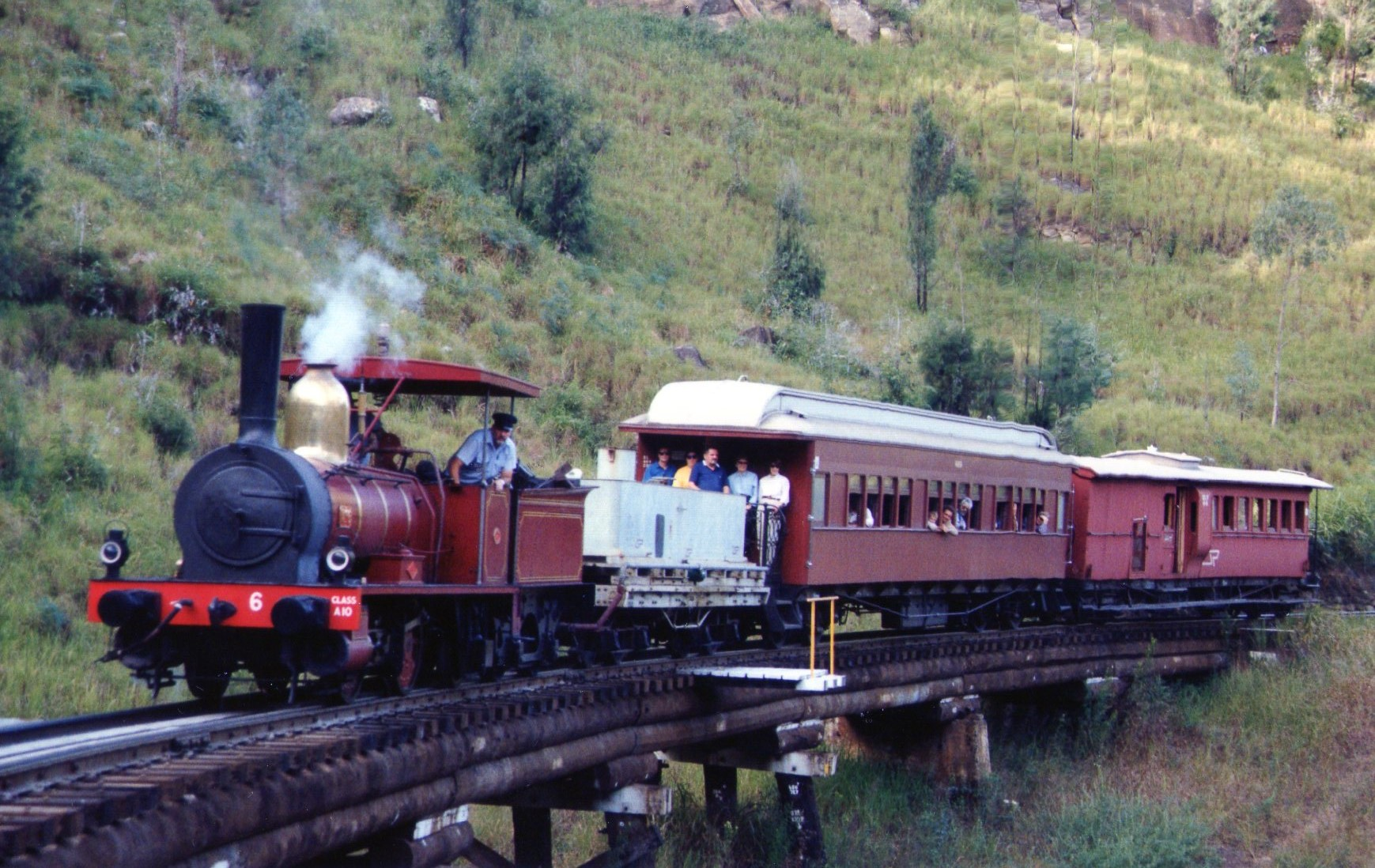
This train is the maximum load an A10 class can haul up the 1 in 50 grades of the Main Line

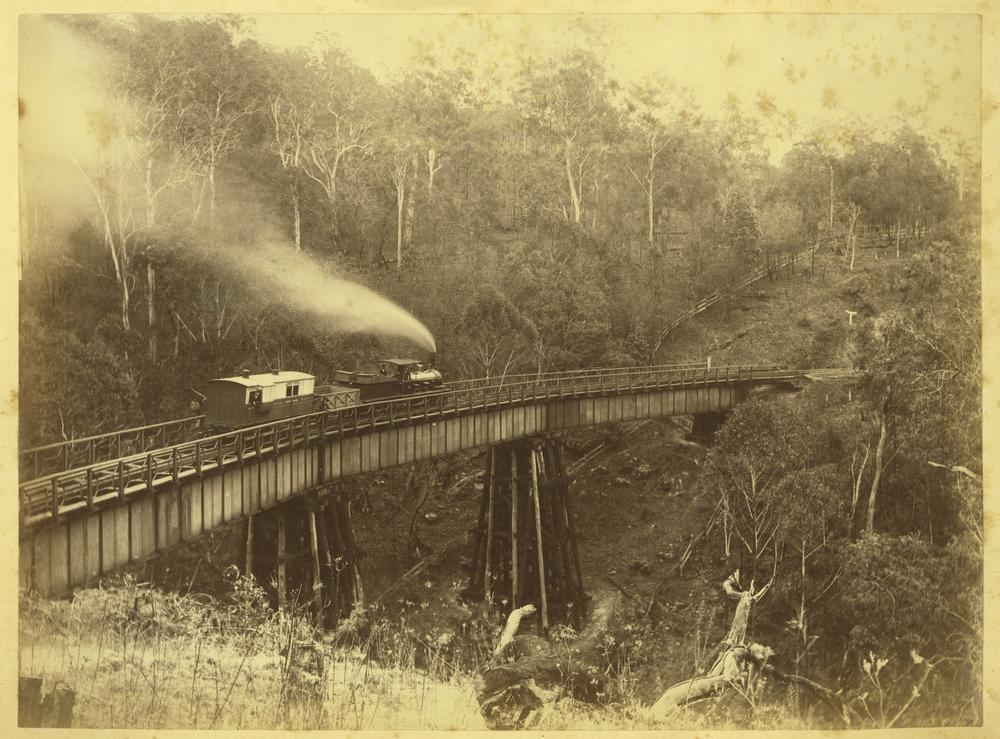
Train descending the Main Line ~1880

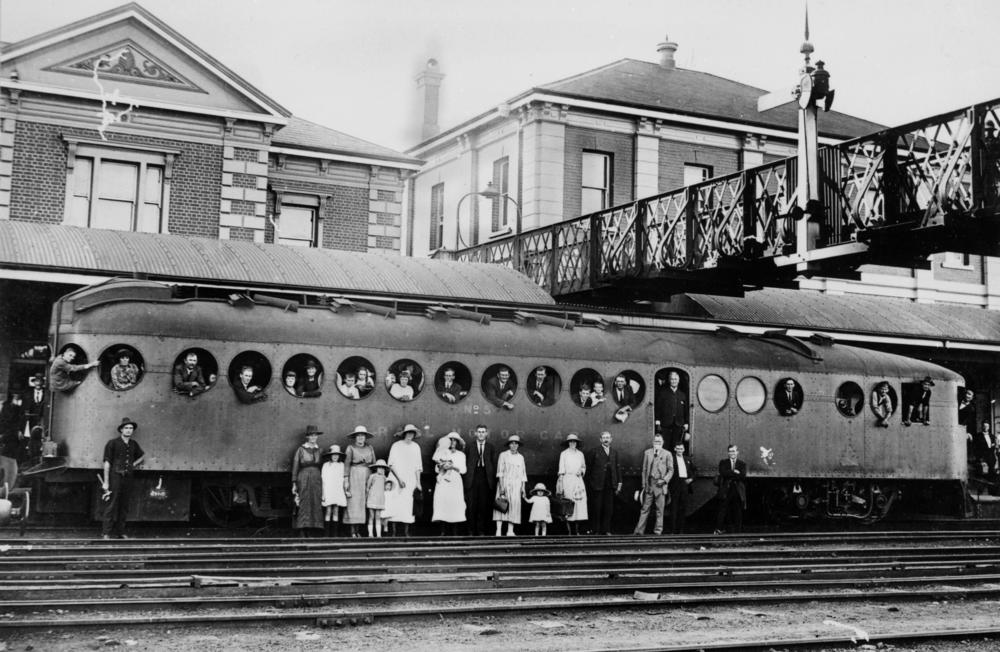
McKeen rail motor excursion train from Samford to Toowoomba at Toowoomba Railway Station, ~1923

Beyond Grandchester, the line was built with curves of 5 chains (100 m) radius and uncompensated grades of 1 in 50 (2%), giving an effective grade of 1 in 41 (~2.5%) on 100 m (5.0 chains) radius curves. Two tunnels were required on the section to Laidley, known as 'Six Chain' (either because it is situated on a 6 chains or 120 m radius curve, or because it is 6 chains or 120.7 m to be exact) long, or both) and 'Victoria' after the English Queen of the day. The latter is 540 m (1,770 ft) long, and both remain in service, being the oldest single track railway tunnels still in use in Australia.

From the western portal of the Victoria tunnel the line descends at 1 in 50 to Laidley and then over relatively flat (1 in 100 maximum grades) easy country to Gatton (opened 1 June 1866) and Helidon (opened 30 July 1866). This 38 km (24 mi) section was duplicated in 1913–14, with the section from Laidley to Yarongmulu (just west of the Victoria Tunnel) being built to 1 in 60 for Brisbane bound trains.

=== Surmounting the main range ===
From Helidon the line climbs 369 metres (1,211 ft) in 26 km (16 mi) up the Main Range to the summit at Harlaxton [612 metres or 2,008 feet above sea level (asl)] at an average grade of 1 in 70. However, as the maximum grade is 1 in 50 uncompensated with 100 m (5.0 chains) radius curves, the ruling equivalent grade is 1 in 41, and the maximum speed on the entire section is 30 km/h (19 mph). This section was opened on 30 April 1867. As built the section contained 157 cuttings (up to 520 m or 1,710 ft long and 16 m or 52 ft deep), 128 embankments (up to 360 m or 1,180 ft long and 13 m or 43 ft high), 47 bridges (total length 1,580 m or 5,180 ft, up to 369 m or 1,211 ft long and 22 m or 72 ft high), 175 culverts, 9 tunnels (total length 886 m or 2,907 ft), 49 curves of 100 m (5.0 chains) radius and a further 77 curves between 110 m (5.5 chains) and 400 m (20 chains) radius, with a total length of 17.7 km (11.0 mi), or 68% of the section.

Comment on the design

A 1995 report commissioned by QR to investigate improving the clearance (loading gauge) through the tunnels so 2.9 m (9 ft 6 in) high ISO containers could be accommodated includes a section commenting on the original design. It states that:

the route adopted is a steep (1 in 50 grades) sinuous (5 chain or 100 m radius curves) one more suitable for horse drawn vehicles and the maximum permitted speed on such curves is, even today, only 30 km per hour. The combined effect of the grades and curves is equivalent to a grade on straight track of 1 in 42 and this severely restricts train loads.

This effect of curvature on resistance to locomotion appears not to have been considered by the 'designers' as no reference to it has been found in our research of the papers of the day.

In defence of the adopted route ... while the excavation of cuttings along the side of hills was comparatively easily achieved, the transportation of excavated material over any distance was (during construction in the 1860s) relatively expensive and slow, hence the construction of long embankments was not perceived as practicable.

For example, the 'Six Chain' tunnel could have been eliminated by constructing a 400 m long embankment up to 10 m high. Similarly, long cuttings were not viable and tunnels were excavated at much lessor [sic?] depths of cut than would be adopted today.

Speed of construction (27 km between Grandchester and Gatton completed in 19 months) as well as cost were very important considerations to the Queensland Colony and in this instance future considerations were suppressed.

In relation to the Main Range section, it said:

the design of the route is further flawed in that it appears little effort was put into balancing cuts and fills so as to minimise the amount of earthworks/bridging.

While such balancing is not essential nor even cost effective (bearing in mind the problems in 1866 of transporting earth over longer distances) a review of Section 5 by William Mason (Acting Engineer-in-Chief of NSW Railways) in 1868 shows only one third of excavated material was used in embankments. He further reported that this surplus material could, in many instances, have been used as fill to eliminate some of the 47 bridges constructed.

This contention is demonstrated by the fact that by 1900 at least 17 bridges had been filled in, and today less than 12 of the original 47 bridges exist.

Of the bridges eliminated, 12 were of iron girder construction, and some of these were lattice types up to 30 m long which were designed and manufactured in England. The designers were apparently unaware that many of these girders were to carry curved track with the consequence they were seriously overloaded and had to be strengthened on site.

Only 1 bridge, 'Swansons' at 154.7 km (over Lockyer Creek) was replaced (in 1900) by another bridge, being a concrete surfaced masonry structure of 3 x ~10 m arches up to 15 m high.

When bridges were eliminated the opportunity was generally taken to ease or eliminate curves by way of deviations so that during the 1867-1902 period some 19 deviations were made to the original route. These deviations were so substantial that in 1903 the entire route was resurveyed and new Working Plan and Sections were prepared.

Over the years since 1902 further deviations have been made eliminating a further 18 bridges and in overcoming major slips at Ballard (in 1950) and at 144 km (in 1994).

In addition, between 1992-95 an access road was constructed on the Up side (ie. left hand side of a train traveling to Toowoomba) of the track which has largely removed the shallow cuttings and widened the low embankments so that today the appearance of the route is greatly changed from the original construction, to be more open and visible.

Comparatively speaking this section of railway may be likened to a goat track made to contour nearly every little spur and valley in the side of the range. Its main redeeming feature is that it was built quickly (27 months) but this has cost Queensland greatly in operating and maintenance costs over the last 128 years (at time of report, ie. 1995).

In 2013 QR called tenders for the lowering of the 11 tunnel floors to enable 9 ft 6 in (2.9 m) ISO containers to be carried when the work is completed. The work was completed in 2020 during the COVID-19 shutdown. It also enabled QPB Baggage and Power Cars to be used on the Westlander between Brisbane and Charleville.

=== East to the Capital ===
The early realisation by the Queensland government of the advantages of rail transport over river transport resulted in the line soon being extended east towards Brisbane. The line was extended from Ipswich to Oxley West (now Sherwood) on 5 October 1874, and Oxley's Point (later Riverton) on 4 February 1875.

The section from Indooroopilly to Roma Street (Note: Situated beside Roma Street in Brisbane City. The street was named after the wife of the first Queensland Governor, Lady Diamantina Bowen (née di Roma); as was the town of Roma, located on the Western Line 511 km west of Roma Street. Roma Street Station serves as the 0 km post on the QR system.) was constructed at the same time and opened 14 June 1875, with stations in West Milton (now Taringa), Toowong, and Milton. This section initially operated separate from the rest of the Main Line, until the completion of the first Albert Bridge over the Brisbane River connected the two parts on 7 July 1876 (connecting Oxley Point toIndooroopilly). As part of that project the line west of Ipswich was realigned with a new bridge over the Bremer River at Wulkuraka opening on 26 April 1875. Part of the original line remains to access the North Ipswich Railway Workshops Museum.

In 1877, Auchenflower station opened on the line between Toowong and Milton.

In 1881, a siding was constructed on the site of the current Chelmer station, just south of what was the Riverton station.

The section from Ipswich to Roma St was duplicated between 1885 and 1887, indicating how quickly the traffic volume grew on the line. The Albert Bridge was built to accommodate two tracks in 1876, though only one was laid at the time.

In 1889, the siding at Chelmer was converted into a station, and Riverton station to the north was closed.

The 1893 flood resulted in the collapse of the first Albert Bridge, resulting in the Indooroopilly to Roma Street section again operating separately from the rest of the Main Line. Ferries were used for transport across the river to connect the two sections until the second and current Albert Bridge opened in 1895.

The line west of Ipswich was duplicated to Wulkuraka in 1902, to Grandchester in 1913 and from Yarongmalu (western end of the Victoria Tunnel) to Helidon in 1918.

The section from Roma St to Corinda (11 km) was quadruplicated in 1963, and extended to Darra (a further 5 km) in 2011, which became the junction for the first section of the new Springfield line at that time.

== Current line standards ==
The Main Line is currently laid with 47 and 50 kg/m (94.7 and 100.8 lb/yd) rail between Roma St and Ipswich, 41 kg/m (82.7 lb/yd) rail west of there. The two tracks added in 1963 between Roma St and Corinda have an axle load of 20 tonnes (19.7 long tons; 22.0 short tons), the rest of the line has a 15.75-tonne (15.50-long-ton; 17.36-short-ton) axle load.

The speed limit is 100 km/h (62 mph) to Rosewood, 80 km/h (50 mph) west of there except for block freight and coal trains which are limited to 60 km/h (37 mph), and 30 km/h (19 mph) when traveling downhill from Harlaxton to Murphys Creek.

The section between Ipswich and Rosewood features bi-directional signalling.

=== Electrification ===
The Main Line between Roma St and Darra was the first section of railway electrified in Queensland, commencing service in 1979. Electrification has subsequently been extended to Rosewood, the limit of Brisbane urban rail services.

== Branch lines ==
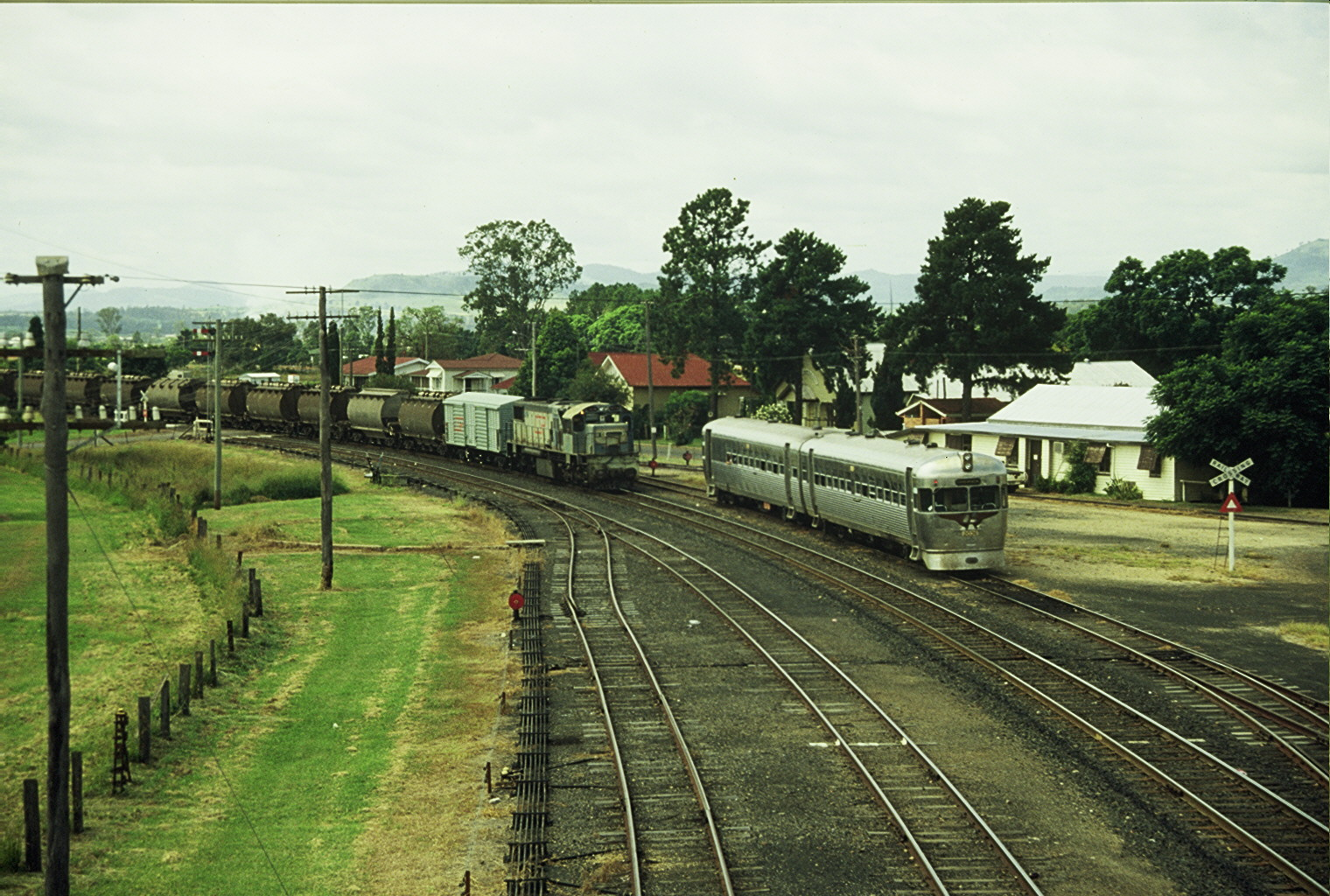
The 2000 class railmotor set operating the Ipswich–Helidon service waits between runs as QR loco 1576 passes on a westbound train at Helidon, 1987. The Helidon–Toowoomba leg was operated by a coordinated bus service.

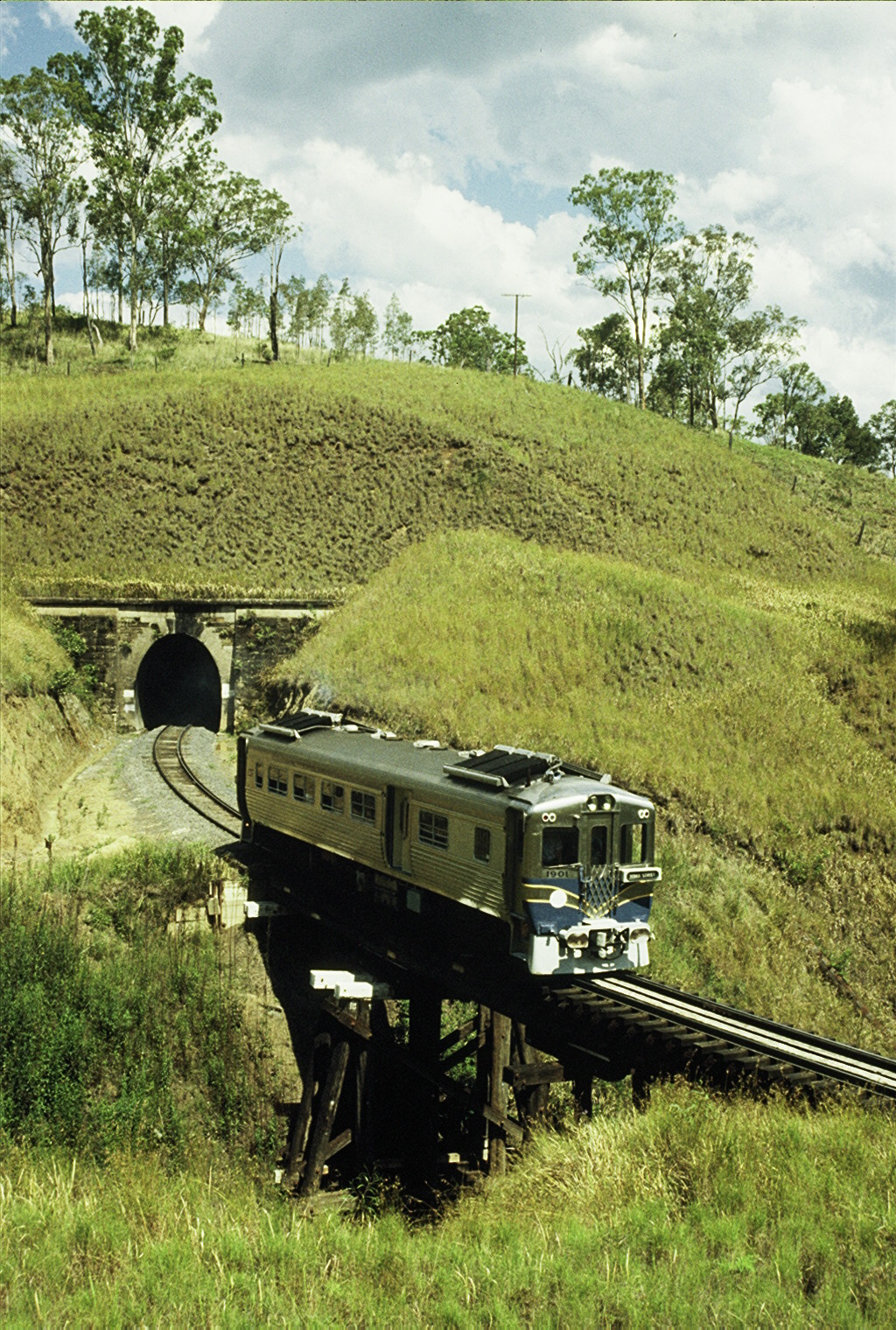
QR RM 1901 descends the Main Line, 1987

A series of branch lines were built to connect to the Main Line, and these are listed from east to west below.

- Corinda–Yeerongpilly line (3.9 km) opened on 2 June 1884 as part of the line built to connect the Main Line to the South Brisbane river wharves at Stanley St. This line now connects the Main Line to the Beenleigh line (including the major freight yard at Acacia Ridge) and the Cleveland line, including the line to the main Brisbane seaport at Fisherman Islands.
- Darra–Springfield a new passenger only line opened on 2 December 2013.
- Redbank–Bundamba loop completed 1904, this line serviced a number of small coal mines, and the remaining Bundamba–Swanbank section services a power station.
- Tivoli/Mt Crosby A line was built from North Ipswich 4 km to serve a coal mine at Tivoli, opened 23 March 1898. In 1912 the line was extended 7 km to Mt Crosby adjacent to the Brisbane River to facilitate construction of a weir and water treatment plant, and then supply coal. The Mt Crosby section closed in 1932, with the remainder closing in 1965.
- Dugandan and Mt Edwards (Fassifern Valley lines) The first branch line in Queensland was from near Ipswich (Fassifern Junction) to Harrisville, opened 10 July 1882, and the line was subsequently extended to service a sawmill at Dugandan, just south of Boonah in September 1887. A branch from Kalbar to Mt Edwards opened in October 1922, proposed to be extended to join the Warwick–Maryvale line to provide a direct line to Warwick, known as the 'Via Recta'. That would have involved another crossing of the Main Range through Spicer's Gap, involving a spiral loop with uncompensated 1 in 33 grades and 100 m-radius (330 ft) curves, giving a ruling grade equivalent of 1 in 27. From 1888 until 1930 the Brisbane–Sydney railway connection was via Toowoomba, Warwick and Stanthorpe (the Southern line) with a change of gauge at Wallangarra on the NSW border. The Via Recta proposal was intended to bypass Toowoomba, but would have involved very significant construction costs. Once it was agreed to extend a standard gauge line from Casino and Kyogle in NSW to South Brisbane (opened 1930), the rationale for the Via Recta disappeared. Both lines closed in 1964, though the 5 km section from Ipswich to Churchill was retained until 1994 to serve several goods sidings.
- Brisbane Valley railway line from Wulkuraka to Yarraman. Opened between 1886 and 1913, 161 km, closed between 1988 and 1993. A proposed extension to connect to Nanango, terminus of the branch line from Theebine Junction was never constructed.
- Yarrowlea–Ebenezer railway line opened on 1 February 1990, 5.4 km, serves a coal mine that ships export coal via the Port of Brisbane.
- Rosewood–Marburg opened 18 December 1911, 14 km, closed in sections between 1964 and 1995.
- Laidley–Mulgowie opened 19 April 1911, 11 km, closed 23 January 1955.

== See also ==
- Rail transport in Queensland
- Travelling post office, Queensland
