= Mihi Creek heritage site =

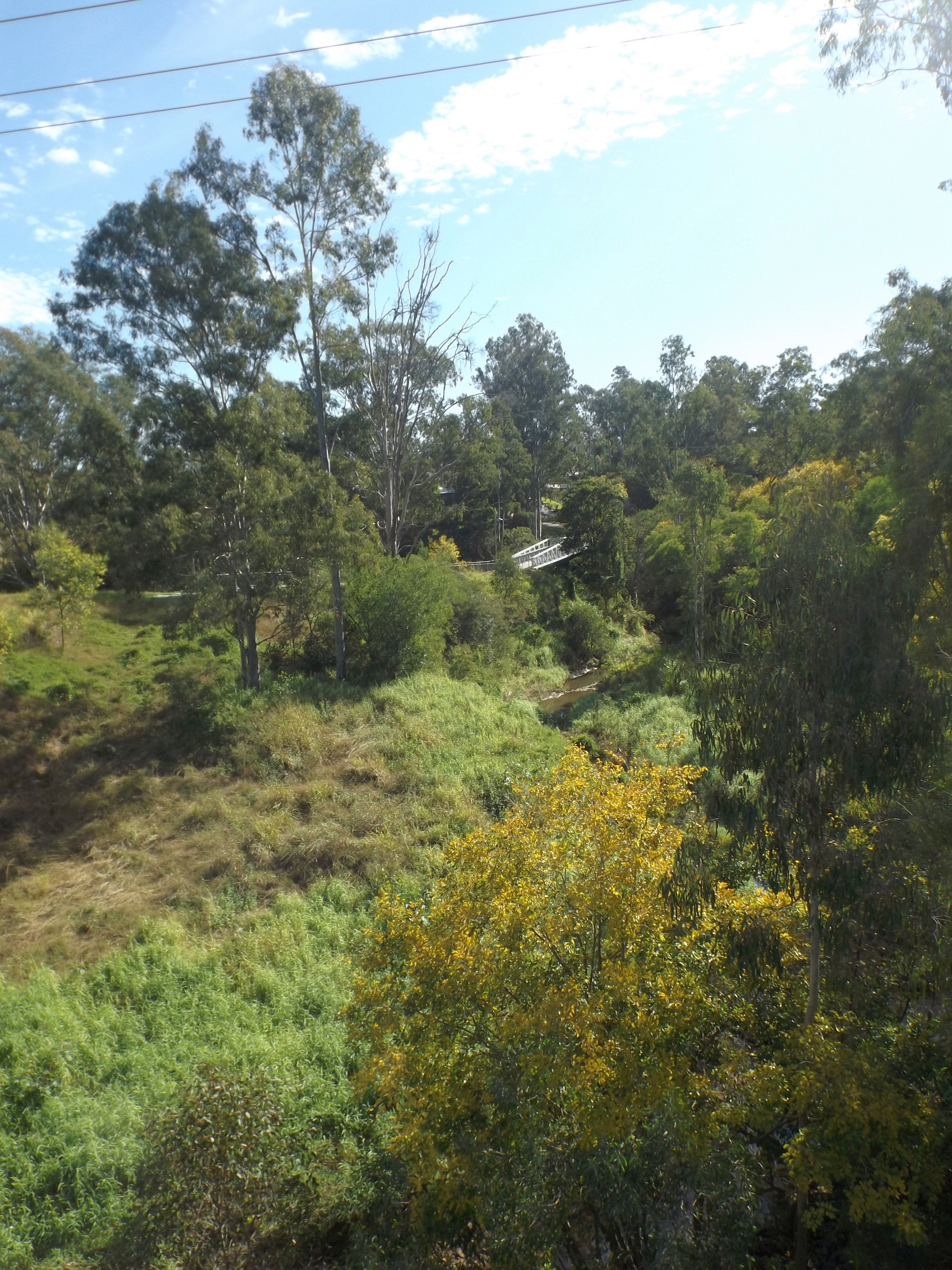
- Mihi Creek, 2015

- Location within Queensland Location within Australia
- 27.5932°S 152.7536°E
- Location: Mihi Junction, Brassal, City of Ipswich, Queensland, Australia

Queensland Heritage Register
- Official name: Mihi Creek Complex, Mihi Junction, Mi Hi Creek
- Type: archaeological
- Designated: 16 July 2010
- Reference no.: 645610
- Significant period: 1865–c.1960
- Significant components: embankment – railway, machinery/plant/equipment – mining/mineral processing, formation – railway, culvert – railway, pile/s, coke oven, cutting – railway

The Mihi Creek heritage site is a heritage-listed archaeological site at Mihi Junction, Brassall, City of Ipswich, Queensland, Australia. It is also known as Mihi Junction and Mi Hi Creek. It was added to the Queensland Heritage Register on 16 July 2010.

== History ==
The Mihi Creek site is a cultural landscape created as a result of mixed within the area since the early 1860s. Past use of the area is divided into two distinct though connected historical phases – the use of the area by Queensland Railways for Queensland's first main line railway, and then as an evolving coal mining and coke manufacturing operation in 1871, concluding around 1960.

=== Railway Operations (1865–1875) ===
Queensland's colonial government fostered the development of railways as a means of developing the State and providing social benefits. It was argued that rail would reduce freight costs and save travel time for passengers. An added incentive for rail development in Queensland was the very poor state of the roads. In wet weather especially, this hampered the transport of freight.

The Ipswich reach of the Bremer River was chosen as the eastern terminus of the first main line railway instead of Brisbane because of the importance of Ipswich to Darling Downs pastoralists. Ipswich was becoming a major inland port and was located at the intersection of important transport routes to the Darling Downs and Upper Brisbane Valley.

The Chief Engineer responsible for construction of the railway was Abraham Fitzgibbon, later to be engaged as Queensland's first Commissioner for Railways. Charles Fox and Son, an engineering firm based in England, were appointed as consulting engineers and Peto, Brassey and Betts, contractors with worldwide railway construction experience, were engaged to construct the line.

Construction of the first section of main line between Ipswich and Bigge's Camp (now Grandchester) officially commenced on 25 February 1864 with the turning of the first sod at North Ipswich by Lady Diamantina Bowen. The original route followed the north bank of the Bremer River crossing Mihi Creek and Iron Pot Creek and joining the route of the present main line at Wulkuraka. The line was officially opened on 31 July 1865.

The first bridge over Mihi Creek was one of four bridges constructed on the line between Ipswich and Grandchester. The embankment of the Mihi crossing was exposed to flood waters from the Bremer River and Mihi Creek and began to subside after a flood in April 1867. The crossing was notorious for the sharp reverse curves in the approaches to the bridge. In May 1868, the Mihi deviation was completed at a cost of about £6350 and opened for traffic. This crossed the creek above the flood level about 200 metres (660 ft) further up stream and it followed a gentler curve. The old line was removed and the bridge was dismantled and stored.

The line was used until 1875 when a new line was opened to the south across the Bremer River, cutting out the original first six kilometres from the North Ipswich Railway Workshops and through Wulkuraka. However, a portion of the line between North Ipswich and Wulkuraka was retained to service the railway workshops and also for the use of coal mining and coke manufacture that were then occurring at Mihi Creek.

=== Coal Mining and Coking Operations (1864–c. 1960) ===
The discovery of coal in Queensland dates from 1825 when outcrops were observed by Major Edmund Lockyer on the banks of the upper Brisbane River. Two years later, when Ipswich was settled as a convict outstation, known as Limestone, the presence of coal was noted between the convict settlement and Brisbane by Captain Patrick Logan. The following year, explorer Allan Cunningham also marked several outcrops on the Bremer River on his survey map for New South Wales Governor Ralph Darling.

Coal was one of the first minerals in Queensland to be commercially mined. Mining originally commenced at Goodna in 1843 with the West Moreton Coalfield at Ipswich following in the early 1850s.

Primary sources of historical information for coke manufacture in the West Moreton field, and across Queensland generally, are scarce as the early regulation of Queensland's mining industry was focused mainly on gold mining. Coal mining was not regulated until the 1880s with the passage of the Mines Regulation Act 1881, the Mineral Lands Act 1882 and the Mineral Lands (Coal-Mining) Act 1886. The Mines Regulation Act allowed the appointment of mines inspectors and the first was appointed in January 1882. While these inspectors reported regularly on the operations of coal mines, coke manufacture was not covered by the definitions of the Act and therefore not considered officially part of the mining industry and went largely unreported. Coal mining was not covered by specific legislation until 1925, and these regulations also made no mention of coking. This has led to no systematic record keeping of coke manufacture in Queensland - especially concerning production numbers, value, equipment used, people employed, or any other detailed characteristic. Information contained in Queensland government records is fragmentary - except for State owned enterprises such as those at Bowen and Mount Mulligan in northern Queensland.

A by-product of coal mining, coke was usually regarded as a somewhat unimportant side industry to the actual mining of coal. Coke is used as both a fuel and as a reducing agent in smelting ore and is produced from baking bituminous coal in ovens at temperatures as high as 2,000 °F (1,090 °C). Coke manufacture became an important extractive industry from the late 1860s with the introduction of mechanically driven transportation, such as steam- powered ships and trains. Sites for coking of coal were most often located adjacent to transport systems, road, rail or water.

In 1871, the Eastwood Mine opened at Mihi Creek and was named after its owner, John Eastwood. The Eastwood Mine was worked during the 1870s and into the early 1880s. Due to the owner's interest in other mines it then laid idle for several years until it was sold to John Wright and Brydon, Jones & Coy in 1884 who renamed the site to Mihi Mine. A short rail spur-line was built, connecting their mining rail/tram infrastructure to the Ipswich railway (presumably to the 1868 main line alignment of the Ipswich - Grandchester rail line).

Twelve coke ovens, known as the Mihi Ovens, were soon constructed on the hillside above Mihi Creek. Coke ovens erected on the West Moreton Coalfield were exclusively of the beehive type, so called because of their domed appearance. Beehive coke ovens consisted of a brick dome with a small circular opening (an exit flue) at the apex, and a larger arched opening at one side to permit charging and drawing. They were usually constructed in double rows known as batteries. The space between ovens was usually filled with rubble and earth to provide insulation and the whole battery surrounded by a stone retaining wall to resist the outward thrust of the brick domes. The Mihi Ovens remained in use until 1890/1 when Wright's attention was diverted a new coal development at the New Bishop Mine located nearby.

It was 1908 before the site was mined again, this time by Paul Francis, a Cornish miner who had been working in the Ipswich area since the 1870s. He named his venture the Francis Mine, constructed a horse whim for hauling loaded coal skips out of his tunnel, sank an air shaft to the workings and erected bunkers of "60-tonnes capacity". The exact location of Francis' first tunnel is not known but in 1917 a second tunnel was driven into the hillside probably below Viking Street. A siding was also laid which connected to the railway workshops which terminated below the tunnel.

In 1923 Francis sold the site to a partnership of miners and a barrister who created and floated the company, Klondyke Collieries Limited. As Klondyke Collieries Limited, coke production at the site flourished. The horse whim was replaced by an electric winder, and air shaft sunk to the workings and fitted with an electric propeller fan, a screening and crushing plant was erected, and power supplied by the Electric Supply Company Limited.

The ovens were used throughout the 1930s. By 1942 several new beehive ovens had been constructed to meet the increased demand for coke for smelting purposes though the actual market for this coke remains unknown (see also Klondyke Coke Ovens). In 1945 and 1946, Klondyke and Bowen in northern Queensland were the only coke producers in Queensland, with Klondyke turning out approximately a sixth of Queensland's coke production.

In 1948 the site changed hands again and was renamed Moreton Colliery and worked until the early 1950s when the pit's supply was exhausted. Bryce (2009:5) recalls that the ovens were still being used as late as 1960. After the closure of the site, coke production was taken over by the nearby Haighmoor site which remained in production for a further 15 years as southern Queensland's only coke works (Klondyke Coke Ovens).

== Description ==
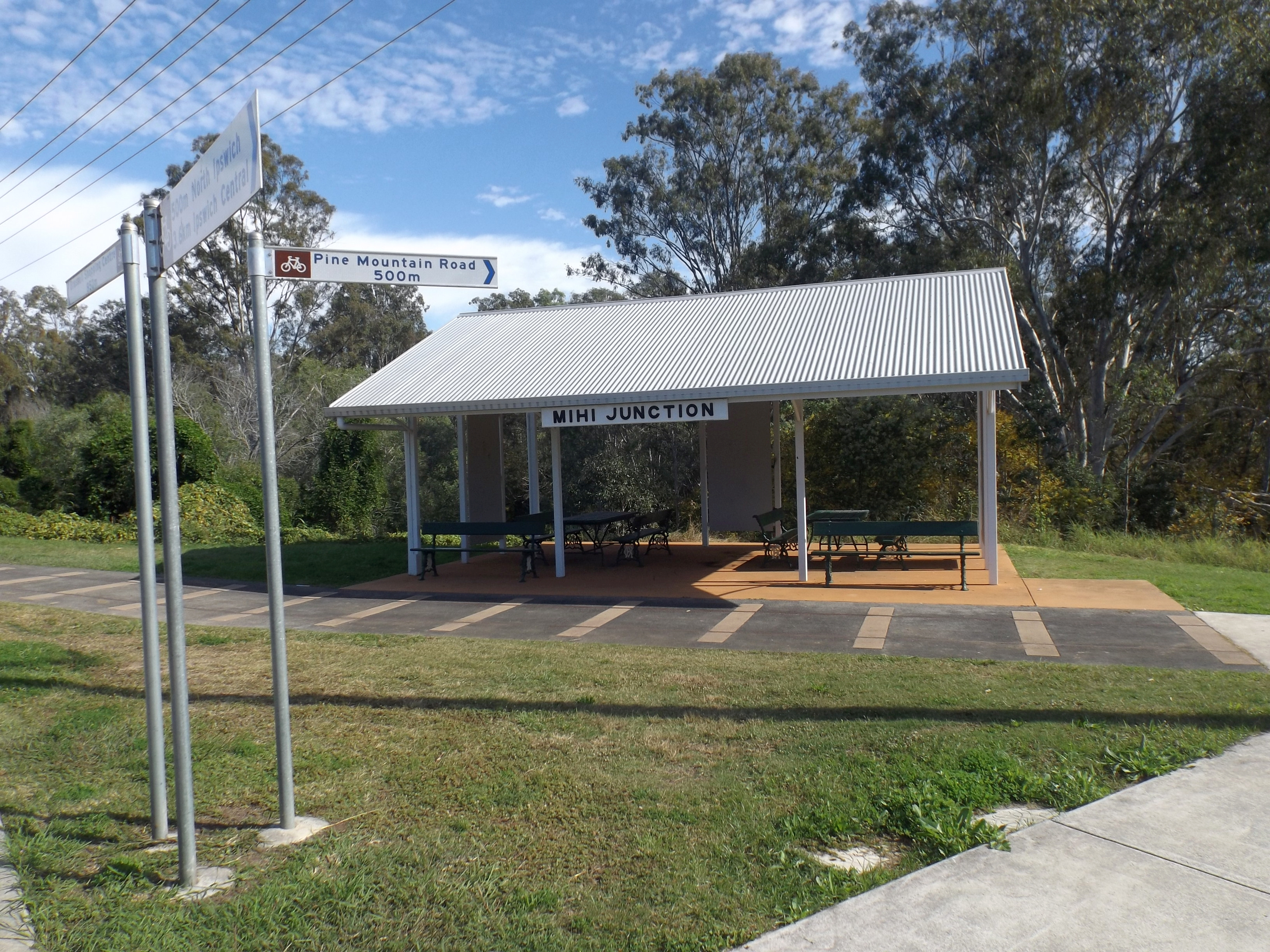
Visitor facilities, 2015

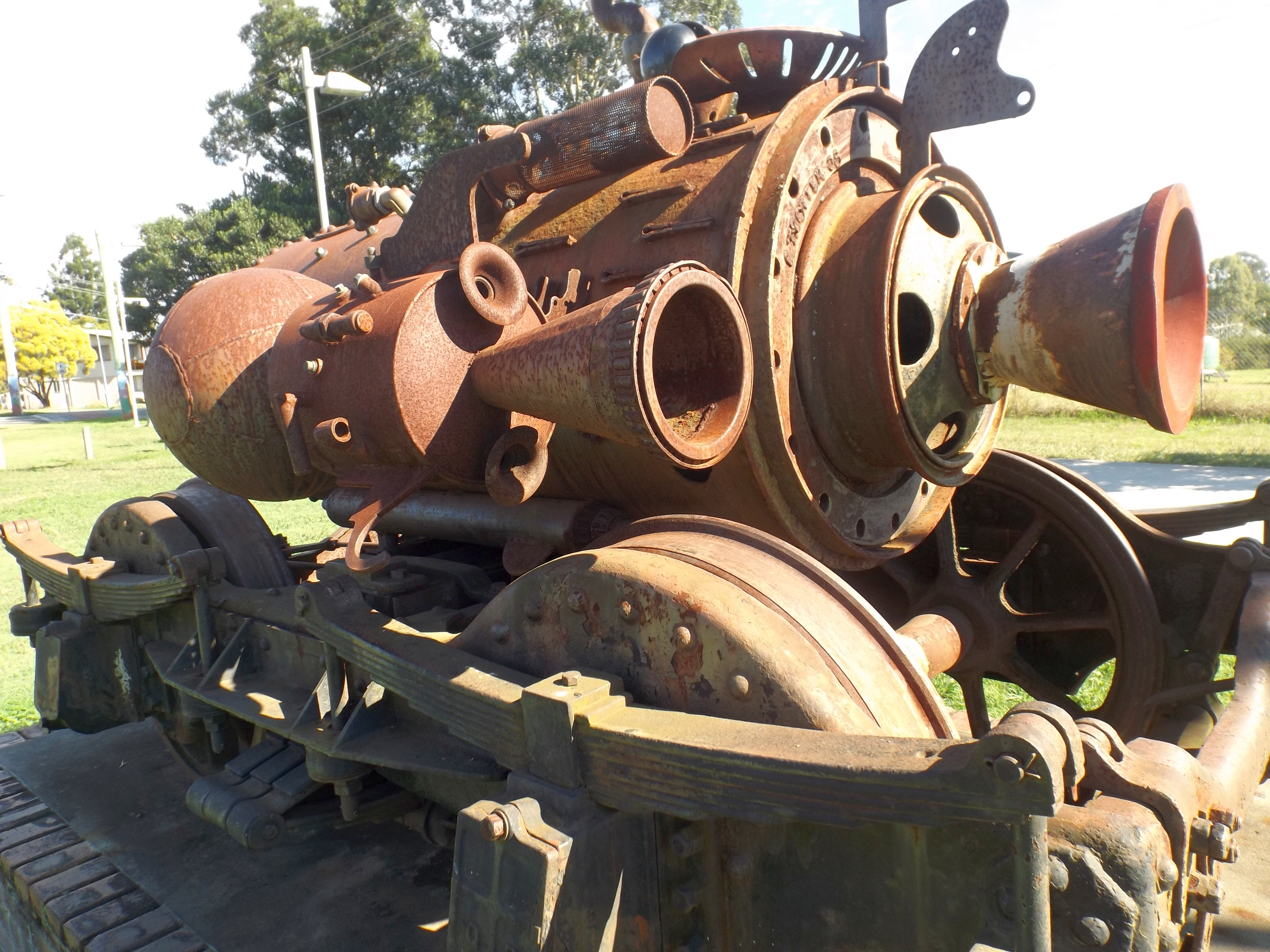
Park sculpture, 2015

The Mihi Creek heritage site is located at North Ipswich in a grassy expanse of broken, undulating land that slopes down to a bend in the Bremer River. Identifiable remains of coke manufacturing are concentrated in the area north of Mihi Creek in Lot 5 on AP3320. The remnants of the railway are located on both sides of Mihi Creek but particularly evident in Lot 34 on SL4200 and Lot 1 on RP146565.

The route of Queensland's first main line railway is featured in original plans held by Ipswich Railway Workshops Museum for the railway. The former railway embankments comprise two sets of raised embankments on Lot 1 on RP146565 (the 1864 alignment) and on Lot 34 on SL4200 (the 1867/8 alignment) and are visible either side of Mihi Creek. Both sets of embankments run in arcs which are roughly parallel to the curve of the bank of the Bremer River to the south.

The larger of the two embankments (the 1867/68 alignment) runs in a gentler curve and is located furthest from the river. The embankments terminate at steep slopes on either side of Mihi Creek where the bridge abutments once stood. On the western side the embankments are readily discernable, rising in height to the edge of the creek. To the east the embankments tend to merge with rising ground and are less identifiable. At the tops of the embankments where the soil is thin, unformed sandstone blocks are visible. The tops of these blocks are at ground level. A number of blocks are also located at the south western corner of the site near where the smaller embankment crosses a gully. A block bearing pick marks is also located in this area.

The remains of an unknown number of broken bridge piles from the 1867/8 bridge remain in situ in the bed of Mihi Creek on Lot 34 on SL4200. Six piles have however been removed to allow the installation of foundations for a new bridge crossing the creek at the same point. From the piles removed, it was noticed that these had sharpened ends reinforced with strips of cast iron and matched the description given for the bridge in the original design drawings.

Dressed sandstone blocks were also identified on the western approaches of the 1864–5 bridge as was a suspected buried sandstone culvert (or the remains of one) on the 1864 line west of Mihi Creek within Lot 1 on RP146565. These remains consist of several cut sandstone blocks, embedded in the side of the 1864 embankment. Later buildup of solids on top of this spot, including the installation of garden beds, may conceal more remains from the culvert. A culvert is shown at this location on early plans for the railway. Additional culverts of this style still exist in the nearby area - at Wulkuraka to the west (Sandstone Railway Culvert, Wulkuraka) and directly east of the site across Mihi Creek at North Ipswich (Sandstone Railway Culvert, North Ipswich).

The first battery of beehive ovens, the "Mihi Ovens" built c.1884 by John Wright and Brydon and Jones & Coy, then owners of the Mihi Mine, is located on Lot 5 on AP3320 immediately north and west of the Klondyke Coke Ovens. The ovens were recorded by Whitmore (1983) and re-located by DERM (2010). In 1987 Whitmore noted a programme of tipping and re-contouring in this area which threatened to engulf the ovens. This fill event has been verified by Department of Environment and Resource Management test excavations. The entrances of three ovens from this original bank of ovens are now partly exposed on the slope situated between the upper and middle terraced areas to the immediate west of the Klondyke Coke Ovens. The full extent and dimensions of the ovens remains unclear, though this battery has been described as consisting of 12 ovens. Their orientation is most likely similar to other beehive ovens on the Ipswich - West Moreton field, being either back-to-back or in a stagger pattern. The space between each oven would be filled with earth or rubble for insulation, and evidence of compacted orange clay was recorded in DERM during test excavations in the area. Evidence of a stone retaining wall surrounding the ovens has not been re-located, but sections may still survive.

The remains of a two small brick structures of unknown function are situated immediately north of the oven sites. Unknown Structure 1, located closest to the ovens and immediately above their adjacent rail spur cutting, is constructed of mortared orange bricks and measures approximately 2 by 3 metres (6 ft 7 in × 9 ft 10 in). Metal artefacts of unknown function remain in situ within the structure, and efforts to identify these artefacts may provide information on the function and use of this structure. Unknown Structure 2 is situated 5 metres (16 ft) north of the first structure. It is constructed of roughly made though well mortared together cement bricks and measures 2 by 2 metres (6 ft 7 in × 6 ft 7 in) and is 2 metres (6 ft 7 in) in height. A cement "capping" has been fitted over the structure, with later bricks added above. The southern elevation features a small cement brick return. The function of this structure remains unknown, though the Unknown Structure 2 may be a capped ventilation shaft installed for one of the two tunnels dug during operations of the Francis Mine on this site between 1908 and 1923.

The "Mihi Ovens" and adjacent Klondyke Coke Ovens were fenced and partially cleared of pest vegetation by DERM under the supervision of DERM heritage officers between February and April 2010. Stumps and root structures of all large trees and plants remains to help maintain the structural integrity of the surrounding soils and the ovens themselves. The alignment of the fence follows the topography of the area and encompasses the predicted extent of the oven battery, the two unidentified brick structures located above the oven batteries, a section of low retaining wall on the lower terrace area to the south of the ovens, and a number of other elements thought to relate to the coke manufacturing operations. The "Mihi Ovens" fence is an extension of the existing fencing for the Klondyke Coke Ovens erected by DERM in 2009. It runs adjacent to Parker Lane in the north, then downhill in a southerly direction before running in a southeast direction to rejoin the Klondyke Coke Ovens fence.

A short section of rail line of unknown date or origin and passing through a small cutting is extant in the vicinity of the coke manufacturing site on Lot 5 on AP3320. This line may represent the spur line constructed sometime between 1884 and 1890/1 while the coke manufacturing operations were owned by John Wright, but would have served the nearby coke ovens (built in the 1940s) and possibly the original battery of 12 ovens located immediately west.

A small bridge, probably originally used as a trolley/tram bridge for the coke or mining operations, was located in the northern section of Lot 5 on AP3320 and is now used as a pedestrian bridge across creek to Clem Street.

Brick debris, coal and coke is strewn across Lot 5 on AP3320 as are metal remnants of machinery including skips, crushing machinery, trammel screens, conveyor buckets and trolley parts.

== Heritage listing ==
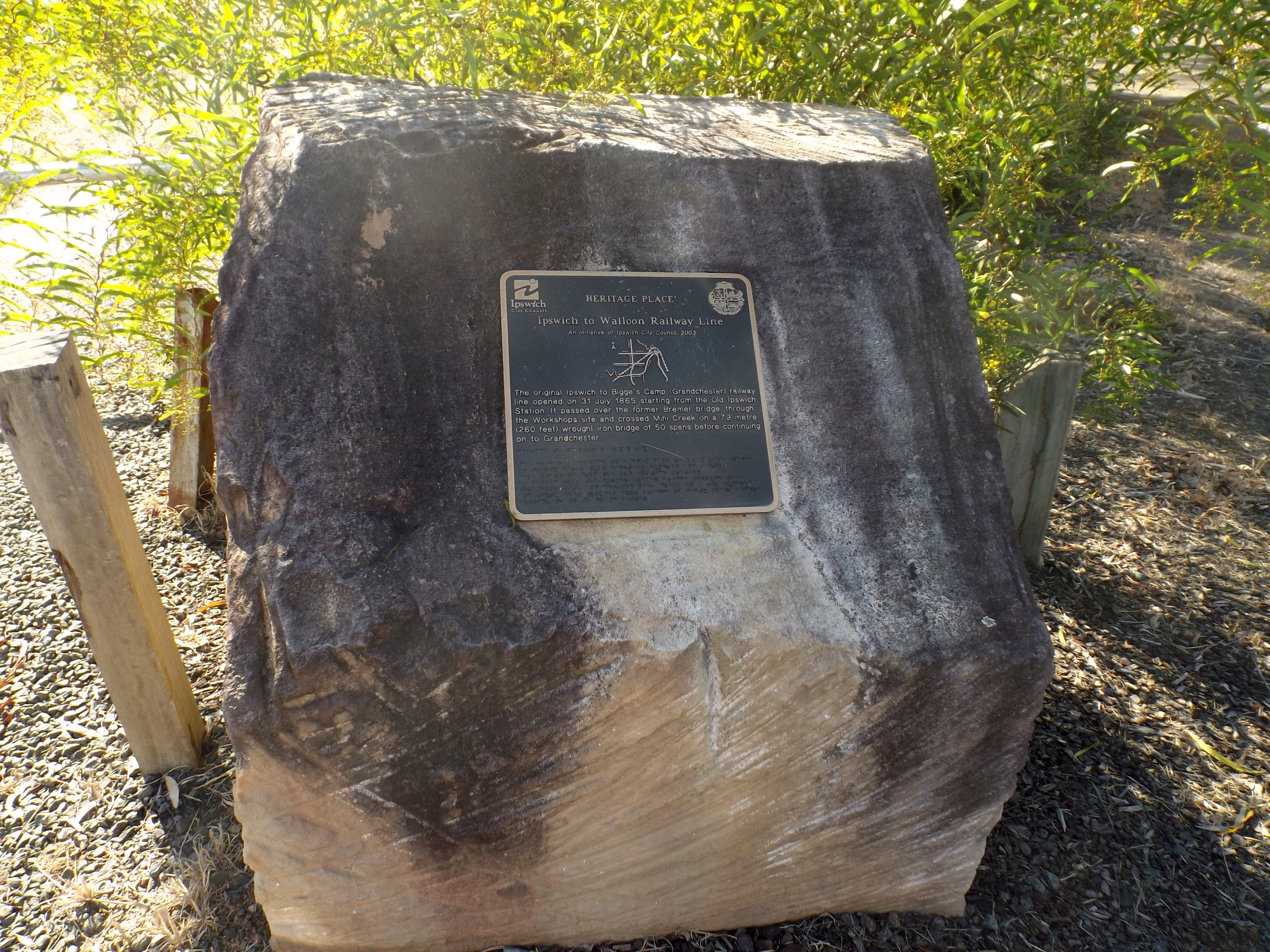
Railway line plaque, 2015

Mihi Creek site was listed on the Queensland Heritage Register on 16 July 2010 having satisfied the following criteria.

The Mihi Creek site provides physical evidence and has potential for additional evidence relating to the early development of the Ipswich area, with archaeological artefacts associated with Queensland's first main line railway, early coal mining and coke manufacture.

Archaeological artefacts associated with the early railway are rare surviving remnants of Queensland's first section of main line railway and provide tangible evidence of the priority placed on the development of the Ipswich region in the formative years of the Queensland colony. The very need for the railway reflects a government desire for faster, reliable and more economic transport to and from the region to promote commerce, industry, growth and settlement.

The remnants of coal mining and coke manufacture are important in demonstrating important industries in the region's and Queensland's history. Coke manufacture played an important though under-recognised role in early coal mining and related industries over an extended period of time (1870s - c. 1960). The Mihi Creek site includes archaeological artefacts which illustrate early examples of processes and activities relating to the increasing demand for quality coke for use in early Queensland industry in the late 19th century (particularly for rail and maritime industries and coal-powered engines generally).

Archaeological investigations within the Mihi Creek site have potential to answer a range of research questions about late 19th Century railway construction and design, and Queensland's late 19th and early 20th Century coke manufacturing industry.

The area immediately adjacent the former rail line embankments have high potential to contain further structures and archaeological evidence associated with Queensland's first section of main line. This area has potential to provide further information about the construction of rail formations and embankments at the inception of the State's railway development. Comparative analyses of elements of the line within the Mihi Creek site with other known previously recorded features (e.g. Sandstone Railway Culvert, North Ipswich, Sandstone Railway Culvert, Wulkuraka, and North Ipswich Railway Workshops) have potential to shed new light on this important development in Queensland's history.

The paucity of primary documentary material relating to coke manufacture in Queensland makes archaeological evidence the primary source relating to coke manufacture. Subsurface remains would feature high integrity due to lack of disturbance since the cessation of coke manufacture in c. 1960. Archaeological investigations within the Mihi Creek site could produce evidence which would confirm or challenge contemporary understandings of the coke industry in Queensland, particularly about coke manufacturing processes, coking infrastructure, coke plant layout, organisation and evolution through time.

While the colliery and coking operations at Mihi Creek were one of a number of the type within the West Moreton Coalfield, they were also one of the longest running (1870s–c. 1960) and underwent significant change over time, including owners and potentially equipment and production techniques. Archaeological investigations have potential to reveal important information about specific operations at Mihi Creek, particularly the full extent of coal mining and coke manufacture, the types of equipment used (other than beehive oven type and probable number in the original battery), and the precise location of key features.

Coke manufacture at Mihi Creek went through several phases and intra-site analyses into changing work practices and inter-site comparisons with other coke manufacture sites would provide insights into the degree of change and/or continuity in coke manufacture practices on the West Moreton Coalfield and potentially across the State.
