= Sandstone Railway Culvert, North Ipswich =

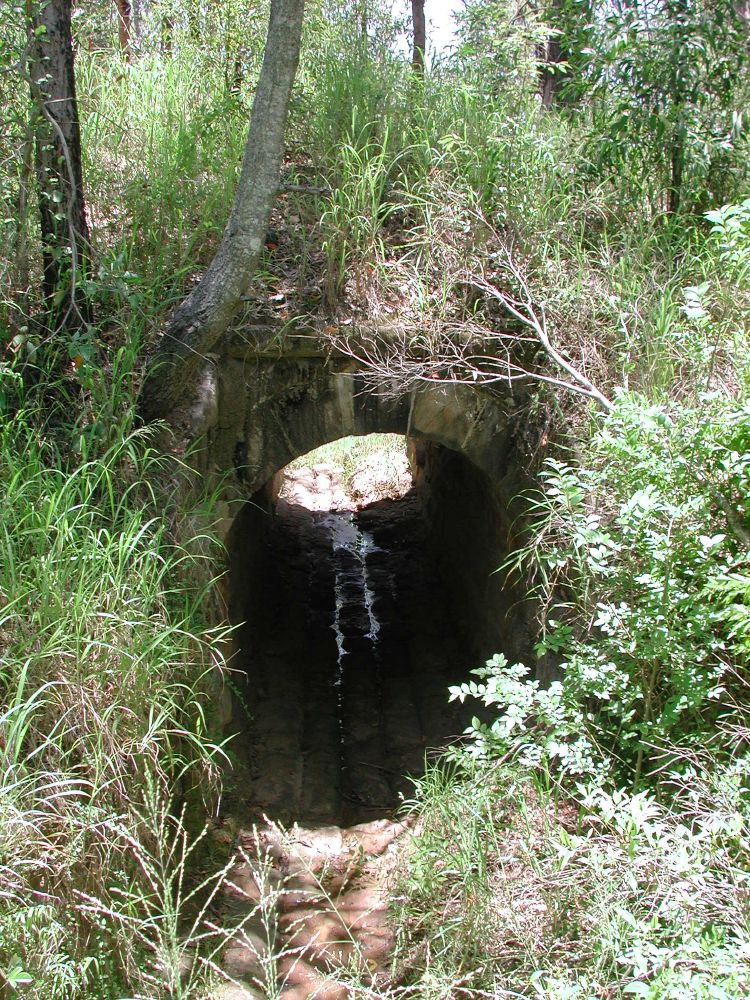
- Sandstone Railway Culvert, 2004

- Location within Queensland Location within Australia
- 27.5951°S 152.7552°E
- Location: about 130m west of the corner of WM Hughes Street and Musgrave Street, North Ipswich, City of Ipswich, Queensland, Australia

History
- Built: 1864–1865

Queensland Heritage Register
- Official name: Sandstone Railway Culvert
- Type: state heritage (built, archaeological)
- Designated: 13 November 2008
- Reference no.: 602562
- Significant period: 1860s

Sandstone Railway Culvert is a heritage-listed culvert at about 130 metres (430 ft) west of the corner of WM Hughes Street and Musgrave Street, North Ipswich, City of Ipswich, Queensland, Australia. It was built between 1864 and 1865. It was added to the Queensland Heritage Register on 13 November 2008.

== History ==
The Sandstone Railway Culvert (c. 1865) at North Ipswich is located near the north eastern corner of the North Ipswich Railway Workshops. It is one of the few surviving original components of Queensland's first section of main line railway constructed between 1864 and 1865.

Queensland's colonial government fostered the development of railways as a means of developing the State and providing social benefits. It was argued that rail would reduce freight costs and save travel time for passengers. An added incentive for rail development in Queensland was the very poor state of the roads. In wet weather especially, this hampered the transport of freight.

The Ipswich reach of the Bremer River was chosen as the eastern terminus of the first main line railway instead of Brisbane because of the importance of Ipswich to the Darling Downs pastoralists. The town was located at the intersection of routes to the Darling Downs and Upper Brisbane Valley. It was the head of navigation of the Brisbane and Bremer Rivers and the town reach of the river was a major inland port for the pastoralists. Ipswich residents together with many pastoralists had campaigned for the town to become Queensland's capital. Eventually, Brisbane assumed that role but Ipswich remained an important regional centre.

The Chief Engineer responsible for construction of the railway was Abraham Fitzgibbon, later to be engaged as Queensland's first Commissioner for Railways. Charles Fox and Son, an engineering firm based in England, were appointed as consulting engineers and Peto, Brassey and Betts, contractors with worldwide railway construction experience, were engaged to construct the line. Several months prior to its completion, operating staff also began to be recruited.

Construction of the first section of main line between Ipswich and Bigge's Camp (now Grandchester) officially commenced on 25 February 1864 with the turning of the first sod at North Ipswich by Lady Diamantina Bowen. The first part of the route for this section commenced in the vicinity of the present Ipswich railway station, it crossed the Bremer River at the town reach and followed the north bank from the North Ipswich Railway Workshops, across Mihi Creek and Iron Pot Creek, joining the route of the present main line at Wulkuraka. The line to Bigge's Camp was officially opened on 31 July 1865.

The culverts built for the Southern and Western railway lines were built to standard designs approved by Fitzgibbon in 1863. They were of masonry or timber construction; concrete was not used for culverts in Queensland until the 1880s. The North Ipswich culvert was built to the standard design for 4 feet (1.2 m) wide brick culverts. This design comprised a floor and sides of cut sandstone with an arched roof made from a double layer of bricks. Another culvert at Wulkuraka is built to the design for 6 feet (1.8 m) wide brick culverts. There are no known examples of intact timber culverts on this section of line.

In 1875, the first part of the route, six kilometres of line between North Ipswich and Wulkuraka including the North Ipswich culvert, was bypassed by a shorter line to the south of the Bremer River via Sadlier's Crossing. This was built as part of the main railway line connection to Brisbane, approved in 1872. The rail link to Brisbane rendered the river trade along the Bremer and Brisbane Rivers redundant and spelt the end of the river port at Ipswich. A portion of the old line between North Ipswich and Wulkuraka was retained to serve the Railway Workshops and a small coal mine.

The North Ipswich culvert is one of only three known culverts that belonged to the first section of main line. The other culverts (Sandstone Railway Culvert, Wulkuraka) are located near Wulkuraka. They are the earliest known railway culverts in Queensland.

== Description ==
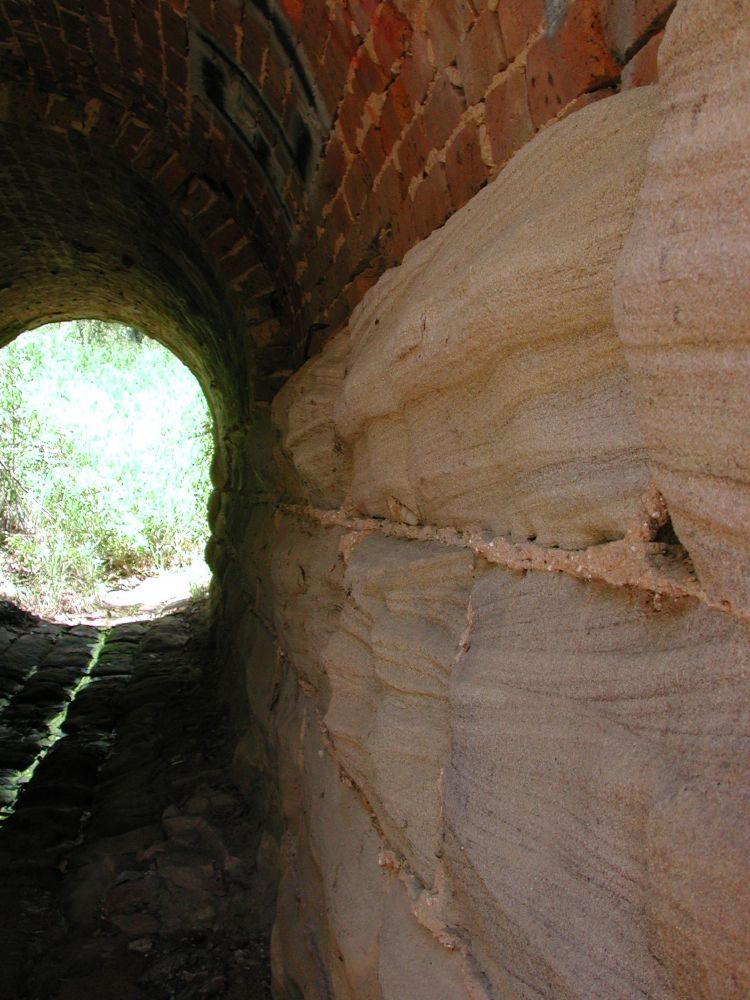
Interior showing sandstone wall and brick ceiling, 2004

The Sandstone Railway Culvert is located in a deep gully about 130 metres (430 ft) west of the intersection of WM Hughes Street and Musgrave Street at North Ipswich. It is contained within a large undeveloped parcel of urban land that slopes down to the edge of the Bremer River.

The culvert comprises a long tunnel, about 1.2 metres (3 ft 11 in) wide, beneath an unsealed roadway. It is lined on the floor and to about a third of its height along the sides with rusticated sandstone blocks. The blocks lining the floor are long and considerably narrower than those lining the side. There are two courses of blocks on each side of the culvert. The arched roof of the culvert is lined with bricks.

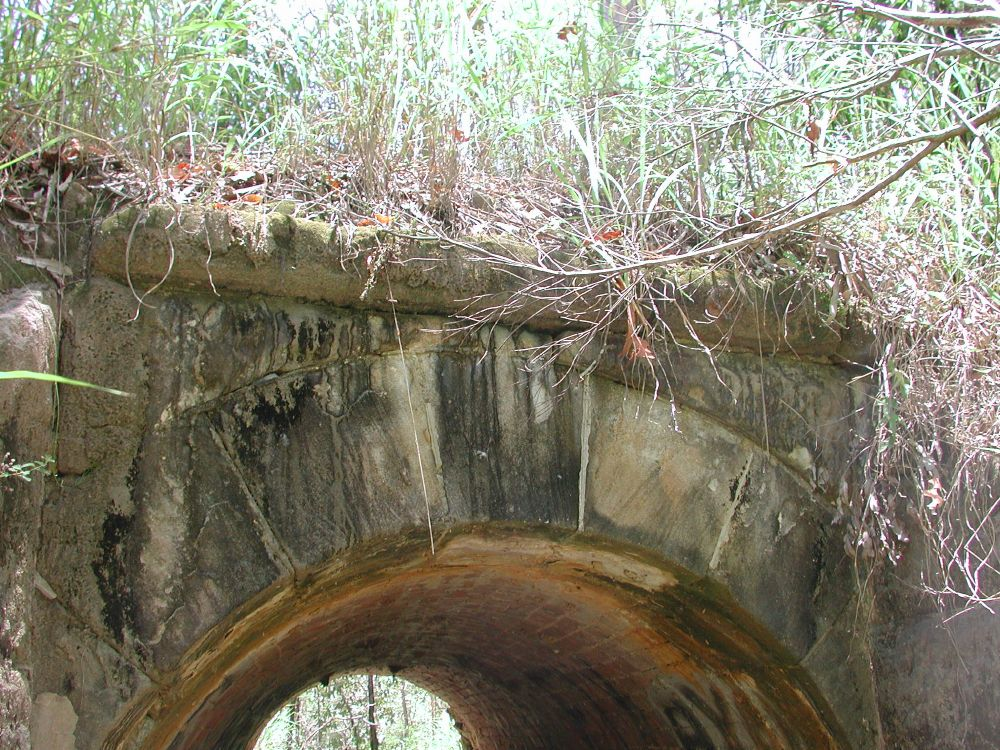
Top of the portal showing dressed stone, 2004

The portals of the culvert are fashioned from dressed sandstone, cut to form an arch; the brick roof of the culvert is not visible externally. At the eastern end of the culvert, the arched sandstone portal intersects with a wing wall made from rusticated sandstone blocks. Both portals are obscured by vegetation at the foot of the gully.

== Heritage listing ==
Sandstone Railway Culvert was listed on the Queensland Heritage Register on 13 November 2008 having satisfied the following criteria.

The place is important in demonstrating the evolution or pattern of Queensland's history.

As an original component of Queensland's first section of main line railway, the Sandstone Railway Culvert (c. 1865) at North Ipswich is important in demonstrating the evolution of Queensland's history. This section of main line, running between the Bremer River at Ipswich and Bigge's Camp (now Grandchester), marked the beginning of Queensland's rail network and was an important step in the economic and social development of the State.

As an element of the now bypassed section of main line between the original terminus at the Bremer River and Wulkuraka, the culvert provides tangible evidence of the economic and geographic priorities of the colonial government in the 1860s. The government decided to terminate the first main line at the Ipswich reach of the Bremer River because it functioned as an inland port for the pastoralists of West Moreton and the Darling Downs. This decision reflected the influence of the pastoralists in these regions and their requirements for faster, more economic transport to port.

The place demonstrates rare, uncommon or endangered aspects of Queensland's cultural heritage.

The North Ipswich culvert is rare as one of the few surviving original components of Queensland's first section of main line railway. The railway culverts at North Ipswich and Wulkuraka (Sandstone Railway Culvert, Wulkuraka) are the only original culverts belonging to the first section of main line that are known to remain intact; they are the earliest railway culverts known to be extant in the State.

The place is important in demonstrating the principal characteristics of a particular class of cultural places.

The culvert is a highly intact example of the standard design for brick culverts on the Southern and Western Railway. The culvert follows the design approved by the Engineer in Chief for construction of the line, Abraham Fitzgibbon, in 1863 and comprises floors and sides of sandstone with an arched roof of bricks.
