= Brassall, Queensland =

Brassall
- Suburb
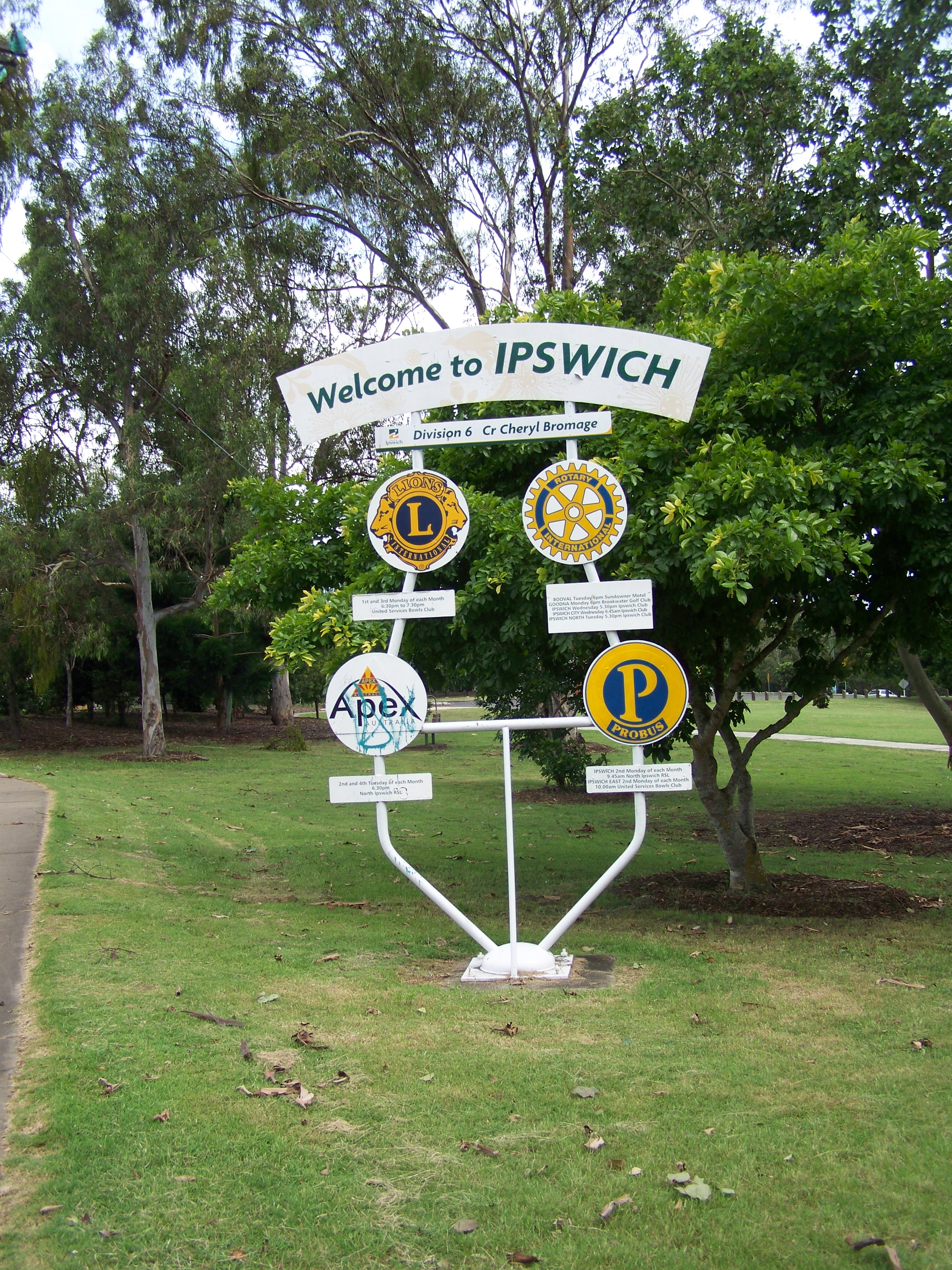
- Signage on Pine Mountain Road, 2010

- Interactive map of Brassall
- Coordinates: 27.5916°S 152.7352°E
- Country: Australia
- State: Queensland
- City: Ipswich
- LGA: City of Ipswich
- Location: 6.9 km (4.3 mi) NNW of Ipswich CBD; 45.5 km (28.3 mi) WSW of Brisbane CBD

Government
  - State electorate: Ipswich West
  - Federal division: Blair

Area
  - Total: 8.2 km^{2} (3.2 sq mi)

Population
  - Total: 12,115 (2021 census)
  - Density: 1,477/km^{2} (3,827/sq mi)
- Time zone: UTC+10:00 (AEST)
- Postcode: 4305
Suburbs around Brassall
Pine Mountain	Muirlea	North Ipswich
Karrabin; Blacksoil	Brassall	North Ipswich
Wulkuraka	Coalfalls	Woodend

Brassall is a suburb in the City of Ipswich, Queensland, Australia. In the 2021 census, Brassall had a population of 12,115 people.

== Geography ==
Brassall has a southern boundary partially marked by the Bremer River and a western alignment along Ironpot Creek. The northern boundary follows the Warrego Highway. Brassall now incorporates part of the old suburb of Raymond Hill. Ipswich–Warrego Highway Connection Road is the main road through the suburb. It runs through from east to north.

== History ==
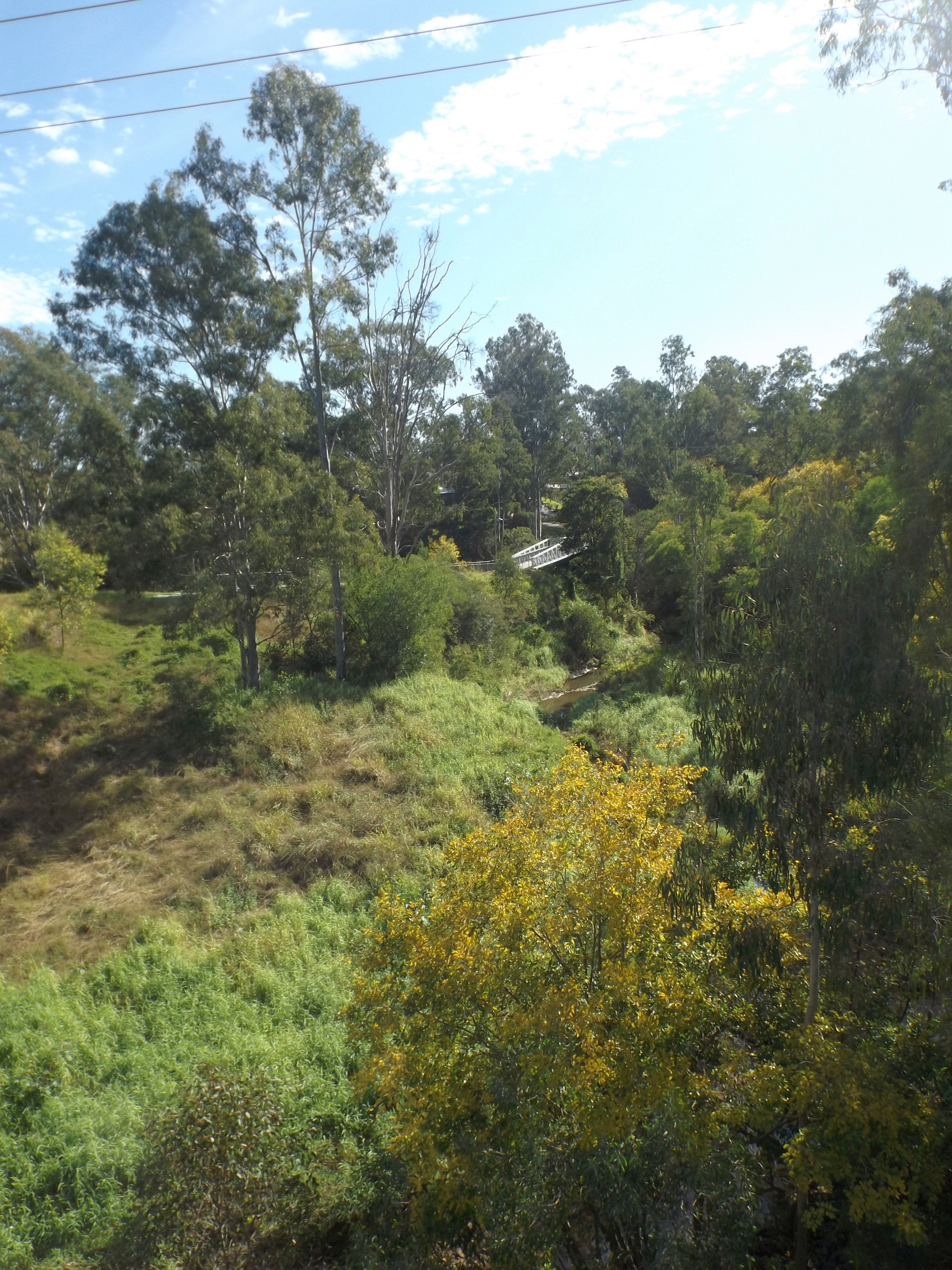
Mihi Creek Complex, 2015

The suburb name first appears on a plan drawn by surveyor James Warner on 6 October 1851; however, the origin of the suburb name is unknown. It was also known as Hungry Flats, as was a stop over for bullock teams that were transporting logs from Pine Mountain to Hancocks saw mill at North Ipswich.

Brassall was a separate shire (Shire of Brassall) with its own council from March 1860 until 1 January 1917 when the area became part of the City of Ipswich.

The Brisbane Valley railway line passed through Brassall. The line opened from Ipswich to Lowood on 16 June 1884, and was extended through a number of stages until it reached Yarraman on 1 May 1913. The line closed in 1993. The disused rail corridor was used to construct the Brassall Bikepath, which is part of the Brisbane Valley Rail Trail.

Brassall Provisional School opened on 10 September 1894. On 10 July 1899 it became Brassall State School.

St George's Anglican Church at 30 Waterworks Road (27.5855°S 152.7540°E) was dedicated on 1923 by Archbishop Gerald Sharp. The altar was designed by the diocesan architects Atkinson and Conrad, and made by Mr L. Larsen of North Ipswich. The church's closure on 15 November 1988 was approved by Assistant Bishop Ray Smith.

St Mark's Lutheran Evangelican Church was originally at Gatton where it was dedicated on 29 October 1950. In 1967 the church was relocated to Brassall, where it was rededicated on 19 November 1967.

Ipswich State High School opened on 1 July 1951.

Ipswich Adventist School opened on 21 January 1968.

The suburb was officially bounded and named in 1991.

North Ipswich Uniting Church was originally located at 105 Downs Street, North Ipswich. It was previously the North Ipswich Presbyterian Church, until the Uniting Church in Australia was established in 1977.

== Demographics ==
In the 2016 census, Brassall had a population of 10,898 people.

In the 2021 census, Brassall had a population of 12,115 people. 82.8% of residents were born in Australia, with the next most common countries of birth being New Zealand at 3.0%, England at 2.4%, the Philippines at 0.8%, Scotland at 0.4% and South Africa at 0.4%. 89.1% of people only spoke English at home, the next most common languages spoken at home were Samoan at 0.5%, Mandarin at 0.4%, Tagalog at 0.3%, Auslan at 0.2% and French at 0.2%. The most common religions in Brassall were No Religion at 43.7%, Catholic at 15.0%, Anglican at 11.2% and Uniting Church at 4.1%. The most common occupations in Brassall were Community and Personal Service Workers at 15.2%, Technicians and Trades Workers at 14.9%, Professionals at 14.9%, Clerical and Administrative Workers at 13.4%, Labourers at 12.2%, Sales Workers at 10.0%, Machinery Operators and Drivers at 9.0% and Managers at 8.6%. The highest levels of educational attainment in Brassall were Certificate III graduates at 18.0% followed by Year 10 graduates at 14.4%, Year 12 graduates at 16.8% and Bachelor degrees and higher at 12.1%.

== Heritage listings ==
Brassall has a number of heritage-listed sites, including

- Mihi Creek Complex, Mihi Junction (27.5932°S 152.7536°E)
- Klondyke Coke Ovens, Parker Lane (27.593°S 152.7544°E)

== Education ==
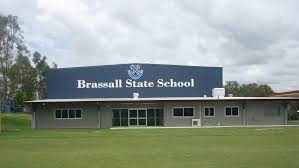
Brassall State School, 2018

Brassall State School is a government primary (Prep–6) school for boys and girls at 130 Pine Mountain Road (27.5884°S 152.7483°E). In 2018, the school had an enrolment of 811 students with 58 teachers (53 full-time equivalent) and 33 non-teaching staff (25 full-time equivalent). It includes a special education program.

Ipswich State High School is a government secondary (7–12) school for boys and girls at 1 Hunter Street (27.5910°S 152.7464°E). In 2018, the school had an enrolment of 1554 students with 117 teachers (114 full-time equivalent) and 70 non-teaching staff (52 full-time equivalent). It includes a special education program.

Ipswich Adventist School is a private primary (Prep–6) school for boys and girls at 56 Hunter Street (27.5958°S 152.7458°E). In 2018, the school had an enrolment of 107 students with 11 teachers (8 full-time equivalent) and 7 non-teaching staff (4 full-time equivalent).

== Amenities ==
The Ipswich City Council operates a fortnightly mobile library service which visits the shopping centre.

St Mark's Lutheran Church is at 5 Hunter Street (27.5917°S 152.7458°E).

Ipswich North Uniting Church (also known as Brassall Uniting Church) is at 2 Pommer Street (27.5875°S 152.7492°E). It is on the site of and adjacent to the former Brassall Methodist Church.

The Islamic Society of Ipswich operate a mosque at cultural centre at 30 Waterworks Road (27.5857°S 152.7539°E) in the former St George's Anglican Church.
