= Bremer River Rail Bridge =

Railway bridge in City of Ipswich Queensland in Australia

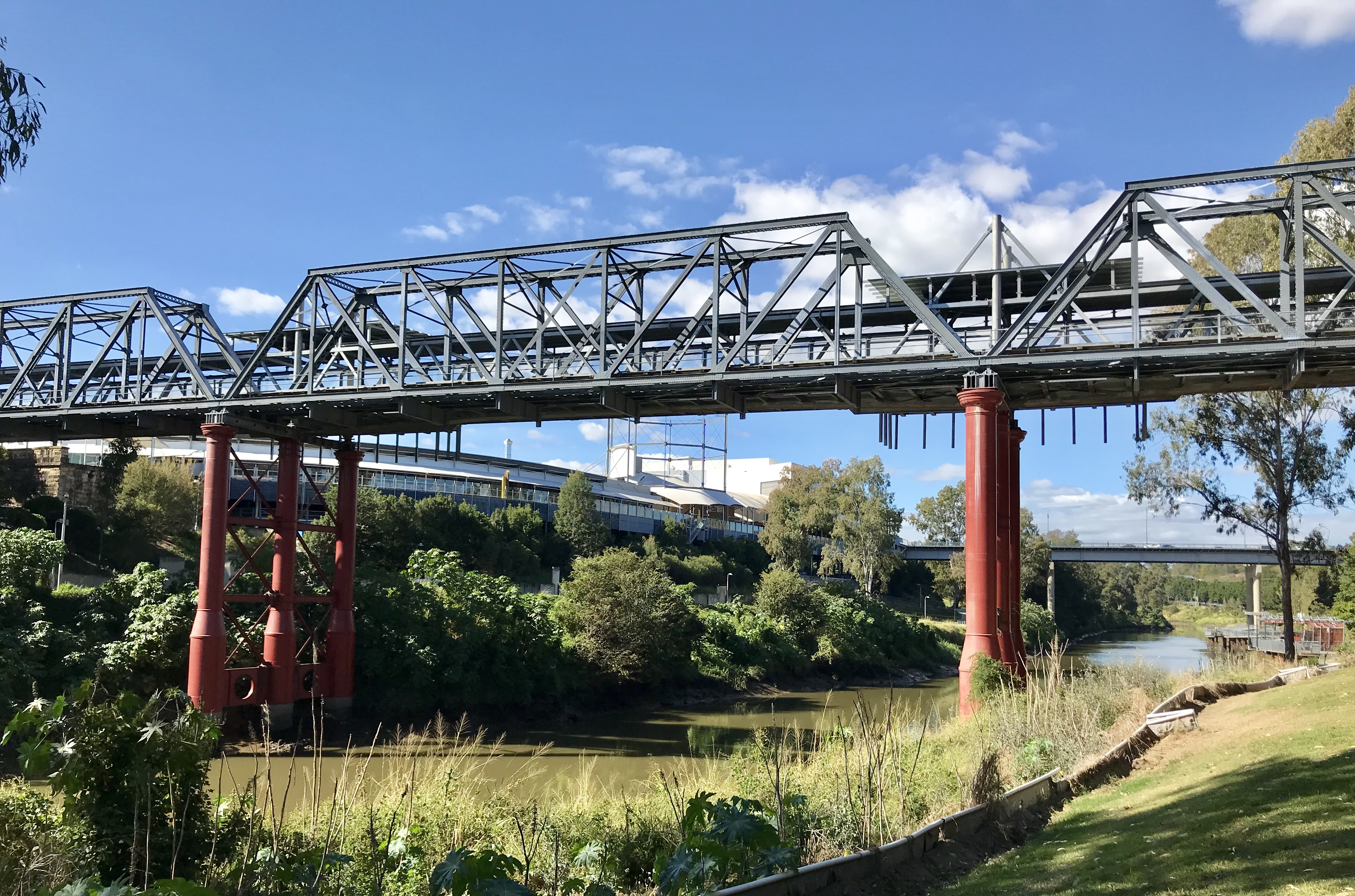
- Bremer River Rail Bridge, 2018

- Location within Queensland Location within Australia
- 27.6104°S 152.7592°E
- Location: off Bremer Street, North Ipswich, City of Ipswich, Queensland, Australia

History
- Design period: 1840s–1860s (mid-19th century)
- Built: 1865–1915

Queensland Heritage Register
- Official name: Bremer River Rail Bridge and pylons and abutments of old bridges
- Type: state heritage (built)
- Designated: 11 December 2006
- Reference no.: 602568
- Significant period: 1860s, 1890s, 1910s (fabric); 1860s–1910s (historical)
- Significant components: bridge/viaduct – railway, pier/s (bridge), abutments – railway bridge

Bremer River Rail Bridge is a heritage-listed railway bridge at off Bremer Street, North Ipswich, City of Ipswich, Queensland, Australia. It was built from 1865 to 1915. It was added to the Queensland Heritage Register on 11 December 2006.

== History ==
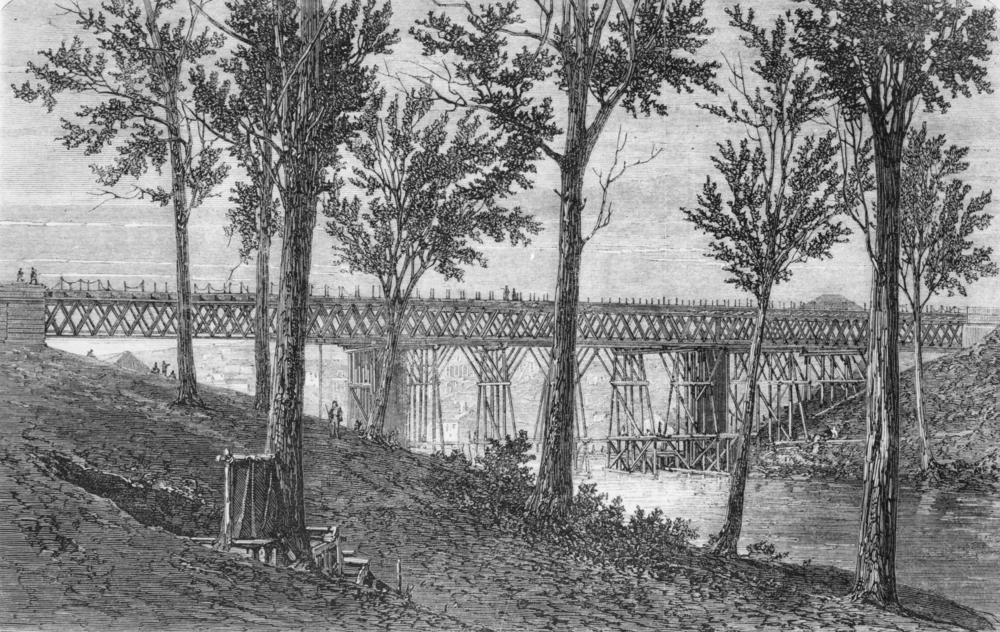
Sketch of the first railway bridge over the Bremer River, circa 1866

The Bremer River Railway Bridge (1915) and the adjacent cast-iron piers (1897) and masonry bridge abutments (1897 and 1865) are located on the banks of the Bremer River near the business centre of Ipswich. The 1865 abutments are the remains of the most substantial bridge on the Main line railway, the first railway to be constructed in Queensland.

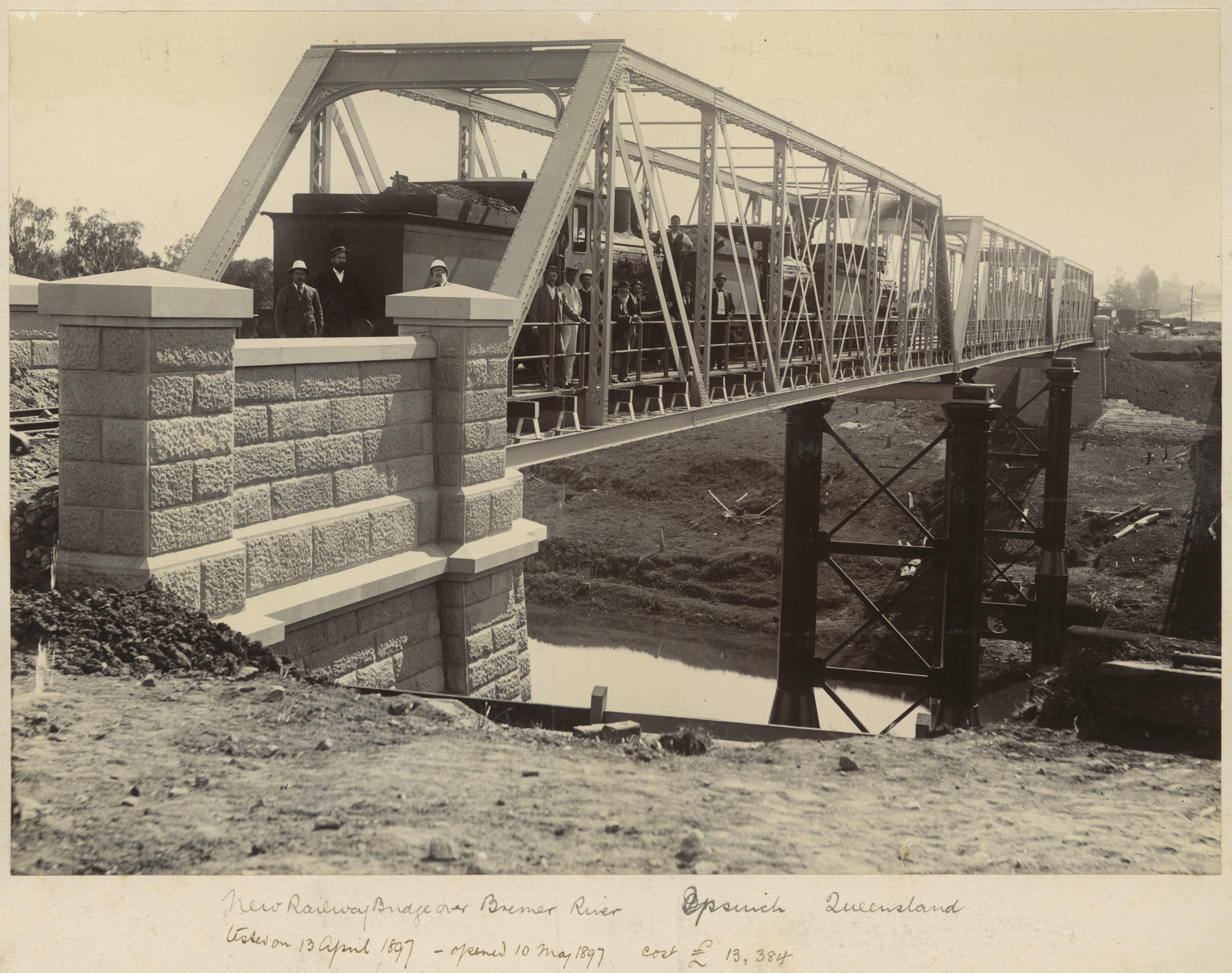
Newly built railway bridge over the Bremer River, Queensland ca. 1897

Queensland's colonial government fostered the development of railways as a means of developing Queensland and providing social benefits. It was argued that rail would reduce freight costs and save travel time for passengers. An added incentive for rail development in Queensland was the very poor state of the roads. In wet weather especially, this hampered the transport of freight. Priority was initially given to providing a railway link to coastal ports for the well-established and influential pastoralists of the Darling Downs.

Ipswich was chosen as the eastern terminus of the railway because of its importance to the Darling Downs pastoralists. The township was a river port, the head of navigation, located at the intersection of routes to the Darling Downs and Upper Brisbane Valley. It was a major inland port servicing the Darling Downs and Ipswich residents together with many pastoralists cherished the hope that the town might become Queensland's capital. Brisbane eventually assumed that role but Ipswich remained an important regional centre.

North Ipswich was originally chosen as the site for the terminus. However, the residents of Ipswich had wanted a high-level bridge to connect north and south Ipswich since the early 1860s. So it was decided to extend the railway to south Ipswich by building a road-rail bridge across the Bremer River. This extension added to the overall cost of the line without contributing to the efficiency of the route. Extra expenditure was needed for the bridge and the additional three kilometres of line needed to reach the new site.

Abraham Fitzgibbon, later engaged as Queensland's first Commissioner for Railways, was appointed Chief Engineer on contract and Sir Charles Fox and Son, an engineering firm based in England, were appointed as consulting engineers. Peto, Brassey and Betts, contractors with worldwide railway construction experience, were engaged to construct the line, including the Bremer River Bridge. Several months prior to the completion of the line, operating staff also began to be recruited.

The original North Ipswich Railway Workshops were completed in 1864 on a cramped site adjacent to the Bremer River close to the northern end of the planned bridge. It soon began to produce rolling stock for the new railway completing an engine truck in 1865 and ten wagons in the following year.

The first Bremer River bridge was designed by Sir Charles Fox and Son and pre-fabricated in Britain. This may explain the pin-jointed members, as these would have simplified the task of assembly in an economy with little skilled labour and unsophisticated manufacturing technology.

It was a deck-type iron bridge with pin-jointed lattice girders on cast-iron cylinder piers. It had substantial abutments (extant) made from sandstone, similar to that used in the abutments of the Heiner Road Bridge over the former Wharf Branch Line. The stone is believed to have been quarried locally at Denmark Hill. Comprising three spans of 150 feet (46 m), it was 67 feet (20 m) above the high tide level. 12 feet (3.7 m) of the width of the bridge was reserved for rail and 23 feet (7.0 m) for general traffic. It was an uncommon example of a road-rail bridge and this explains its wide abutments.

The Bremer River Rail Bridge was not the first iron bridge to be completed on the line. The first was completed in April 1865 and crossed Wide Gully. However, the Bremer Bridge was described in the Brisbane Courier (1 August 1865) as "the most important structure on the first section of the line".

By Saturday, 29 July 1865, the bridge was sufficiently complete to allow a locomotive to cross safely carrying Arthur Macalister (the Lands and Works Minister) and Abram Fitzgibon. On 31 July, Governor George Bowen officially opened the railway at Bigge's Camp (now Grandchester), the western terminus of the line. Abram Fitzgibbon, Albert John Hockings (the Mayor of Brisbane) and Robert Herbert (the Colonial Secretary), also participated in the ceremony attended by a large contingent of pastoralists.

By 1866, it became evident that the northern abutment of the bridge was inadequately designed. A report in March 1867 cited inadequate foundations, poor quality masonry and lack of drainage as the cause of the problems. It had to be rebuilt following a flood in May 1867, when cracks appeared under each girder and nearly every stone in the face showed signs of fracture or damage.

In 1875, with the opening of the Ipswich Deviation, the main western line bypassed the Bremer Bridge. Nevertheless, the bridge continued to carry increasingly heavy loads. This is because it provided access to local coalmines and, more significantly, the North Ipswich Railway Workshops, Queensland's largest facility for manufacturing and maintaining steam locomotives and rolling stock. Expansion of the site took place in 1877 and in 1884 construction of new and larger workshops commenced at an adjacent site.

Given the ongoing expansion of the Workshops and Queensland Government Railways' program of continually upgrading its locomotives to more powerful ones, the bridge was required to bear a growing volume of traffic including increasingly weighty locomotives en route to or from the Workshops.

In 1881 the new Ipswich signal cabin and state of the art interlocking mechanism was installed at the southern end of the bridge at the junction of the main western line and the line across the bridge to the Workshops. The cabin of the signal box was unusual in being three, rather than two storeys high, so that the signalman could see over the top of the bridge and also the main line to the west. It was the only such mechanism to be installed in Queensland outside Brisbane at the time and this is indicative of the high volume of traffic passing through the junction.

In October 1893, it was found that the cross girders of the old bridge were overstrained and in many cases showed fracture of the material. A March 1894 memo to the Chief Engineer's Office stated that the bridge was no longer strong enough to carry the current traffic. Instead of recommending the bridge be reinforced, it proposed that a new bridge should be built. This was partly prompted by on-going problems that had been experienced with the Ipswich Town Council over maintenance of the shared bridge. It was decided to transfer the old bridge to council ownership for the exclusive use of road traffic. The contract for the new bridge was let in January 1896.

This bridge was constructed by Beatty and Walsh under the supervision of Government Engineer, F. L. Keir. The resident engineer was C. S. Graham. Messrs J. W. Sutton and Co. of Brisbane cast the cylinder piers and made the girders. The 1897 Bremer River Bridge and the Indooroopilly Bridge were the first to be riveted using a pneumatic machine.

The bridge was a three-span, six-panel, through Pratt truss design resting on concrete filled cylinder piers. It is believed to have been the first bridge to use a Pratt truss on Queensland railways. Like the earlier bridge, it had masonry abutments; these, together with the piers, are still extant. The new bridge only carried a single set of rails. Its substructure was painted maroon and its superstructure French grey.

First introduced in c. 1890, Pratt truss bridges became Queensland Government Railway's preferred form for major spans until the adoption of reinforced concrete. Patented by Americans Caleb and Thomas Pratt in 1844, the Pratt truss was a very popular design in the United States. The design was such that lighter materials could be used in construction. The diagonal members could be thinner since they were subject to tension forces only and the trusses were deeper enabling the use of bracing across the top members. This stabilised the trusses thus allowing lighter members to be used. This resulted in a more cost-efficient design.

A major expansion of the Ipswich Workshops at the beginning of the 1900s, together with further upgrades of locomotives led to constantly increasing demands on the bridge. The first 12-ton axle load engines, the B17 locomotives, were built at the Workshops between 1911 and 1914. In 1913, the Workshops commenced building C18 locomotives. Together with their C19 derivative, these were the largest conventional locomotives ever to run on the Queensland Government's railways.

Between 1913 and 1915, the substructure of the 1897 bridge was widened and a third bridge (still extant) was built with stronger spans. Like the 1897 bridge, it was a through Pratt truss design. The new bridge was strong enough to carry all of the locomotives in use at the time but the 1897 bridge was restricted to C16/C17 locomotives and was used for shunting operations only.

In March 1967 (initially Easter Weekend of that year), the 1865 bridge was demolished. It had been rendered redundant in 1965 by the construction of the David Trumpy road bridge. The initial demolition attempt was performed using explosives to dislodge the first span. A bulldozer, owned by the nearby sawmill proprietor Hancocks Ltd and driven by Hancocks employee William Eyrlston (Bill) Thomas, was in attendance, connected to the span by a steel cable from the bulldozer's winch, with the expectation that the spans could be reeled in and "caught" by the bulldozer. This effort failed, and the cable snapped, resulting in the span to spear vertically into the Bremer River's riverbed. Bill Thomas was pressed to manually splice the cable and retrieve the span from the riverbed.

The 1897 bridge was removed in 1987 leaving just the extant span on double track piers.

== Description ==
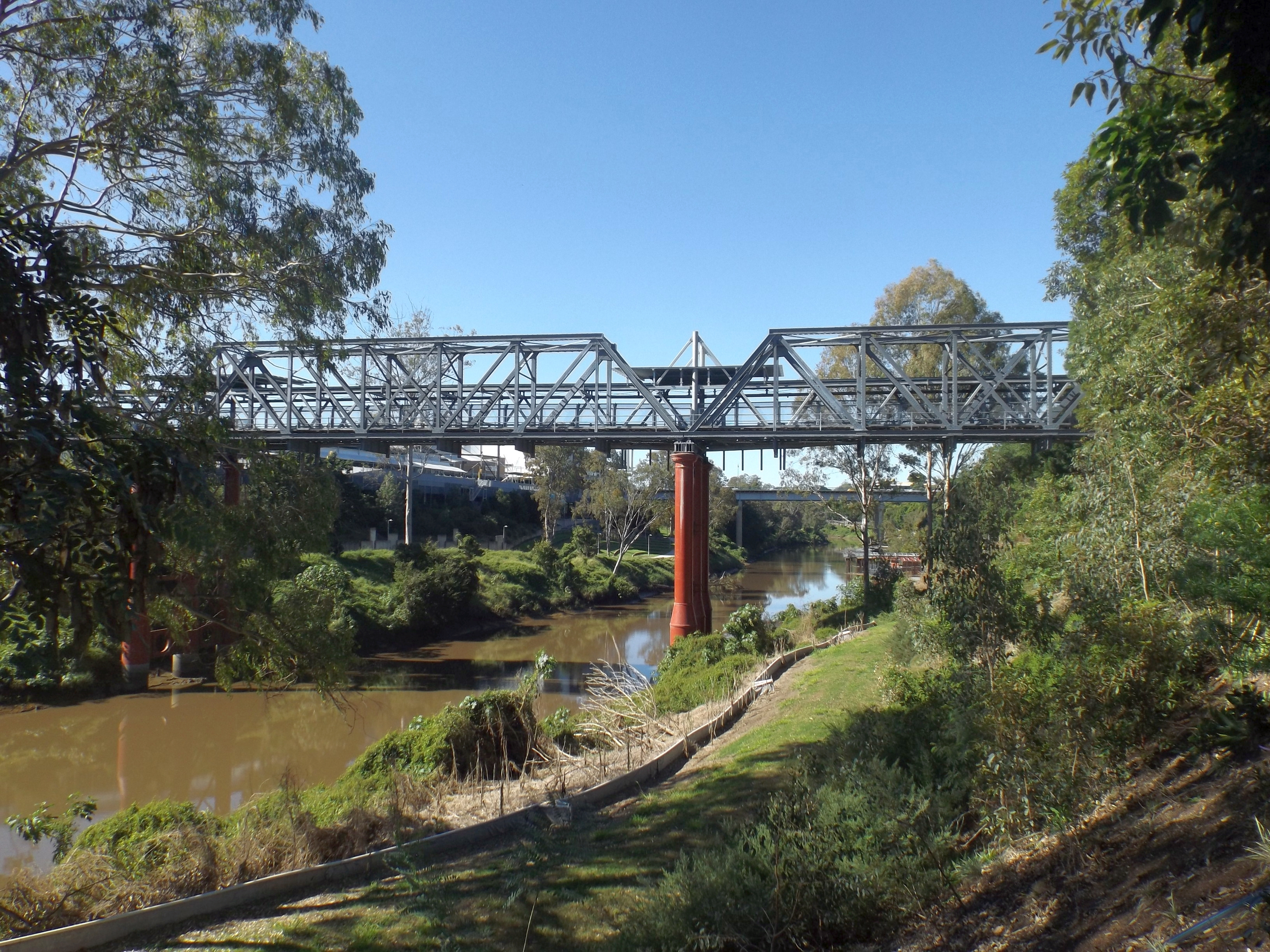
South bank, 2016

The Bremer River Rail Bridge and old bridge abutments are made up of a railway bridge that is still in use and the sandstone abutments of two bridges, now removed, that were located immediately to the east of it. On the south side of the river, the bridge and abutments are set in riverside parklands in the business centre of Ipswich. The north side of the bridge and the adjacent north bank abutments are situated in a commercial development.

=== 1865 abutments ===
The 1865 abutments are physically separate from the other structures a short distance to the east of them.

Made of light coloured, rusticated sandstone blocks, they are wide, massive structures set into the banks of the river. The lower section of the northern abutment is wider than the upper section, forming a kind of plinth. On the southern abutment, the lower courses of sandstone are mostly buried. A sandstone parapet wall is extant along the eastern and western ends at the top of each abutment. Shallow buttresses project from the corners facing the river.

Narrow, horizontal sandstone mouldings running the length of each face divide the facades into horizontal sections. On both abutments a moulding runs along the top of the bottom section, the upper section and the wall.

1897 abutments and piers These abutments form part of the abutments of the 1915 bridge. They are massive but narrower than the 1865 abutments. Like the 1865 abutments they are set into the riverbank. The 1897 abutments are made of rusticated sandstone blocks darker in hue than the blocks of the earlier abutments. A masonry cornice runs around the top of the wall.

A sandstone parapet wall runs along the eastern edge at the top of each abutment. The walls terminate in rectangular sandstone columns. These columns extend downwards to form pilasters on the eastern facades of the abutments. A narrow projecting sandstone coping runs along the top of each parapet wall.

The dark grey, cast iron cylinder piers that supported the 1897 bridge are still extant. These have wide bases that taper sharply inwards at about one third of the height of the piers. The bridge was supported at two points across the river. At each point is a pair of piers. The bridge sat atop a steel girder that is still extant resting between the tops of each pair. Narrow horizontal members and diagonal braces join each pair of piers at three points between the top and bottom.

=== 1915 bridge ===
The 1915 bridge comprises three 45.7 metres (150 ft) spans of riveted, five-panel, through Pratt trusses. Truss bridges usually comprise a combination of vertical and diagonal members fixed between a pair of horizontal girders. Pratt trusses are characterised by diagonal members that slant down, inwards towards the centre of the span. A single railway line passes between the trusses of the Bremer River Bridge and timber decking fills the area between the rails and the structural members of the bridge.

The bridge has concrete abutments designed to match the adjacent sandstone abutments of the 1897 bridge. The cornicing of the 1897 abutments continues around the top of the 1915 abutments. A sandstone parapet wall similar to the one on the 1897 abutment runs along the western edge.

At each of the support points for the 1897 bridge, a third pier, identical in design to the earlier ones, was erected and the supporting beam was extended to support the 1915 bridge.

== Heritage listing ==
The Bremer River Rail Bridge and pylons and abutments of old bridges were listed on the Queensland Heritage Register on 11 December 2006 having satisfied the following criteria.

The place is important in demonstrating the evolution or pattern of Queensland's history.

The earliest masonry bridge abutments (1865), adjacent to the Bremer River Rail Bridge in Ipswich, are important in demonstrating the development of Queensland's history insofar that they constitute physical evidence of the establishment of Queensland's first railway, an important step in the development of the State. They are all that remain of the first Bremer River Road-Rail Bridge, the most substantial structure on this railway. The siting of the 1865 abutments reflects the priorities that influenced the decisions of the Government of the day. Southern Queensland was chosen as the location of the State's first railway because of the priority given to providing a rail link to the coast for the Darling Downs pastoralists. Ipswich was chosen as the eastern terminus because of its importance to the Darling Downs pastoralists as a regional centre and the head of navigation. The location of the bridge within Ipswich was influenced by local demands for a high-level road bridge across the Bremer River.

As an uncommon conjunction on one site of a railway bridge and the remains of two earlier bridges (1865 abutments, 1897 abutments and piers, and 1915 bridge), the Bremer River Bridge structures, as a group, are important in demonstrating the evolution of bridge abutment design and the effect of changing locomotive technology on bridges in Queensland's rail system from its inception until the construction of the most recent bridge in 1915. Three bridges were successively built on the site because of the need to continually upgrade infrastructure as Queensland Government Railways adopted more powerful, heavier, locomotives. Together with the important Railway Signal Cabin and Turntable located at their southern end, the bridges formed important infrastructure supporting the operation of the North Ipswich Railway Workshops. This infrastructure contributes to our knowledge of the operations of the Workshops, which was Queensland's largest facility for the manufacture and maintenance of steam locomotives and rolling stock. As the only rail link to the Workshops from the early 1870s, the Bremer River Bridges were a vital part of its operations and had a relationship to the weight and power of the locomotives being manufactured and serviced by the Workshops at this time.

The place demonstrates rare, uncommon or endangered aspects of Queensland's cultural heritage.

The 1865 abutments are rare surviving remnants of Queensland's first railway line. The only other known extant components of the line include some masonry culverts and Grandchester railway station.

The place is important in demonstrating the principal characteristics of a particular class of cultural places.

The 1865 and 1897 abutments are examples of masonry bridge abutments from the 19th Century and as such, are important in demonstrating the principal characteristics of this type of structure. They are wide, massive structures set into the banks of the river. Masonry parapet walls run along the edges at the top. The 1915 bridge is important as an intact example of a through Pratt truss railway bridge from the early 20th Century. Introduced c. 1890, the Pratt truss became a popular design for major spans.

The place has a special association with the life or work of a particular person, group or organisation of importance in Queensland's history.

As part of the first Queensland railway line, the 1865 bridge abutments are closely linked to the inception of Queensland Rail and so have a special association with this important Queensland organisation. Abraham Fitzgibbon, the Chief Engineer for the construction of the line, was also Queensland's first Commissioner for Railways. Operating staff for the new railways department were appointed just prior to the railway's opening and the line was the first to be operated by them.
