= Heiner Road Railway Overpass =

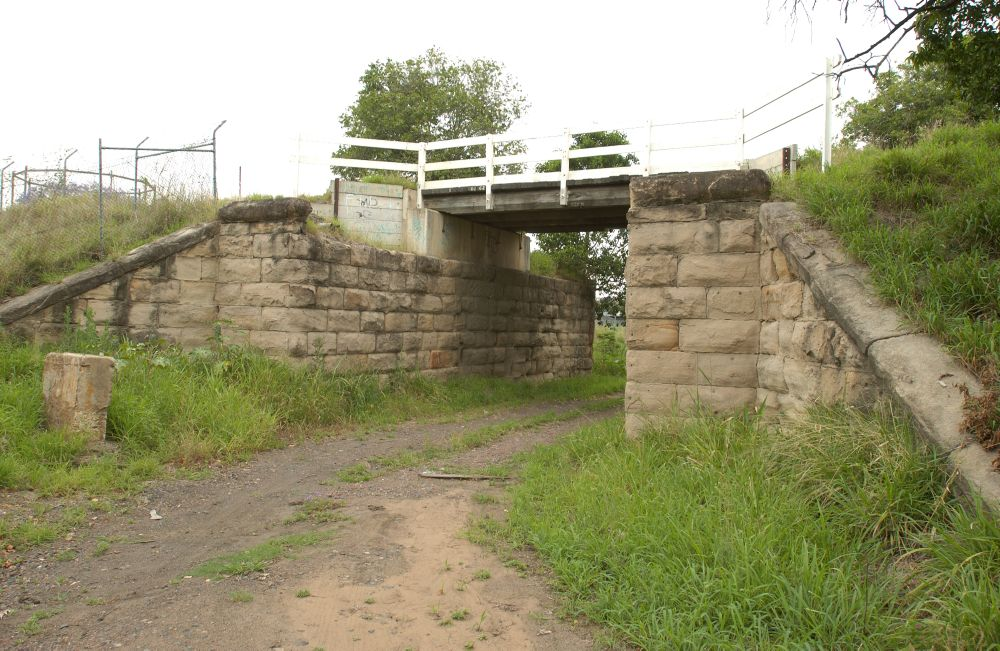
- Heiner Road Railway Overpass, 2015

- Location within Queensland Location within Australia
- 27.609°S 152.7601°E
- Location: Riverlink Shopping Centre, 2 Downs Street, North Ipswich, City of Ipswich, Queensland, Australia

History
- Design period: 1840s–1860s (mid-19th century)
- Built: 1865

Queensland Heritage Register
- Official name: Heiner Road Railway Overpass
- Type: state heritage (built)
- Designated: 28 May 2004
- Reference no.: 602467
- Significant period: 1860s (fabric); 1865–
- Significant components: cutting – railway, abutments – road bridge

Heiner Road Railway Overpass is a heritage-listed road bridge within the Riverlink Shopping Centre at 2 Downs Street, North Ipswich, City of Ipswich, Queensland, Australia. It was built in 1865. It was added to the Queensland Heritage Register on 28 May 2004.

== History ==
The Heiner Road railway overpass was probably constructed in 1864 over the Main Line railway that connected the government wharf on the Bremer River with the North Ipswich railway workshop site. It consists of a modern bridge over substantial stone abutments that are a rare survivor of the earliest railway infrastructure in Queensland and evidence for the way in which the railway network was established.

A reliable transport network was essential to allow the development of the colony of Queensland and the transport of settlers, goods, and raw materials. It is very rare for a first railway to start from a provincial town, rather than the capital and the fact that it did reflects the early history of European settlement.

The first settlement in Moreton Bay had been a penal colony, established in 1824. By 1842, the colony had closed and the area was thrown open for free settlement, though two years before this, squatters had arrived on the Darling Downs and had moved sheep, wool and supplies overland to Sydney, rather than to Brisbane, as it was then closed to civilian traffic.

Ipswich, at first called Limestone, was first used by the penal colony as a source of lime for building. Being on a navigable river, the Bremer, when free settlement began, it soon developed into a thriving trading centre. By 1843, the Moreton Bay region was represented in the New South Wales Parliament and questions concerning the development of the area raised the importance of transport. In 1856, a route from the Darling Downs to Brisbane through Ipswich was surveyed. Planning continued, but in 1859, the long sought separation of Queensland from New South Wales was proclaimed. Elections for the Queensland Legislative Assembly were held in 1860 and a Select Committee was appointed to look into transport. By 1845 the Bremer had a regular river trade but could not take large vessels. Bridges and roads were few and subject to the vagaries of the weather. At the time however, the provision of a rail system was normally considered the province of private enterprise.

Following a failed private scheme to set up a horse-drawn tramway, the Queensland Government stepped in. The first Railway Bill was presented in August 1863. There was heated debate about the cost, route, and construction of the proposed line. Economy was necessary as the population was small and unlikely to make a railway immediately profitable. Moreover, the terrain over the main range to the Downs was difficult. Abram Fitzgibbon, an Irish engineer with international experience in railway construction, was engaged and recommended a narrow gauge track to allow economic construction. This too was controversial but was accepted. The Queensland railway was the first in the world to be constructed as a government enterprise. Surveys for the first section of the line between Ipswich and Bigge's Camp were completed by the end of 1863. It was decided to run the line from Ipswich to the Darling Downs because Ipswich was already accessible by water. Tenders were called at the end of 1863 and that of Peto, Brassey and Betts, a well-known British firm, was accepted. Most of the materials, including locomotives in knock-down form, were sent from Britain to Ipswich by river steamer and the first sod was turned at North Ipswich on 25 February 1864. The first consignment of materials arrived by steamer on 15 August 1864.

A line was laid down to the wharf to receive consignments of materials and move them to a workshops site on level ground above. Public pressure for a bridge across the river resulted in a change of plan and the terminus was moved to South Ipswich in the business centre. A bridge was constructed to carry both road and rail and was just completed in time for the opening of the first section of rail to Grandchester on 31 July 1865. Following the principles used to keep costs down, most bridges on the first line and on subsequent lines were timber. The Bremer River Rail Bridge was the most important of four metal bridges and it, and the Heiner Road overpass had stone abutments in a similar style. The abutments of the bridge were later rebuilt and the bridge itself superseded, carrying road traffic only.

The Wharf Line continued in importance until Ipswich was linked to Brisbane by rail in 1874, following which river traffic diminished in importance. The line was later extended to Hancock's sawmill and was in use for many years. The railway workshop activities soon outgrew the area near the overbridge and a new site for the North Ipswich Railway Workshops was chosen in 1884. Only the 1870s stores building remains on the original site.

The importance of the Heiner Road overpass diminished considerably when the new David Trumpy Bridge across the Bremer was opened in 1965 and the (1865) road bridge was demolished, leaving only its abutments. The overbridge abutments have weathered considerably and some stone from the upper section is missing. The bridge itself has been replaced at least once and the current concrete and timber bridge does not extend across the full width of the abutments. It is now surfaced with gravel. The rail and sleepers of the wharf line were subject to replacement over the years and have been removed, as has the wharf.

== Description ==
The overbridge abutments are situated on the north side of the Bremer River near the abutments of the 1865 Bremer River bridge and behind the early goods store (tarpaulin store), which was part of the first Railway Workshops at Ipswich. The overbridge carries a road, but the railway track that ran between the abutments has been removed. Traces of its route can still be discerned in some places by the presence of depressions formed under sleepers and hand forged spikes.

The abutments are 21 feet (6.4 m) apart and are supported by flanking walls on each side. They are constructed of large coursed blocks of medium to coarse grained and pebbly sandstone with lime mortar. The stone has become considerably weathered, though traces of edge dressing can be seen on some blocks. Ponding and drips of poured lead are visible between and on the front surface of some blocks.

The concrete bridge over the cutting is recent and is marked LXXXX (1990). It does not cover the full width of the abutments and is finished with plain timber handrails.

== Heritage listing ==
Heiner Road Railway Overpass was listed on the Queensland Heritage Register on 28 May 2004 having satisfied the following criteria.

The place is important in demonstrating the evolution or pattern of Queensland's history.

The Heiner Road Railway Overpass is important in illustrating a vital step in the development of Queensland when the first stage of the new colony's railway network was established, opening in 1865. The Wharf Line predated the construction of the main line between Ipswich and Grandchester. Because Ipswich was a river port and the majority of components for the railway were delivered by ship from Britain, the line connecting the government wharf with the workshops, where assembly took place, was laid first and was an essential part of the construction strategy. The plans for the substantial masonry abutments that carried the road connecting with the rail and road bridge over the Bremer River over this line survive and are evidence for the importance accorded to this overpass and to the inauguration of the transport network essential to develop the colony.

The place demonstrates rare, uncommon or endangered aspects of Queensland's cultural heritage.

It is a rare survivor of the earliest railway infrastructure in Queensland and is also one of the very few overpass abutments in Queensland carried out in stone.
