= Klondyke Coke Ovens =

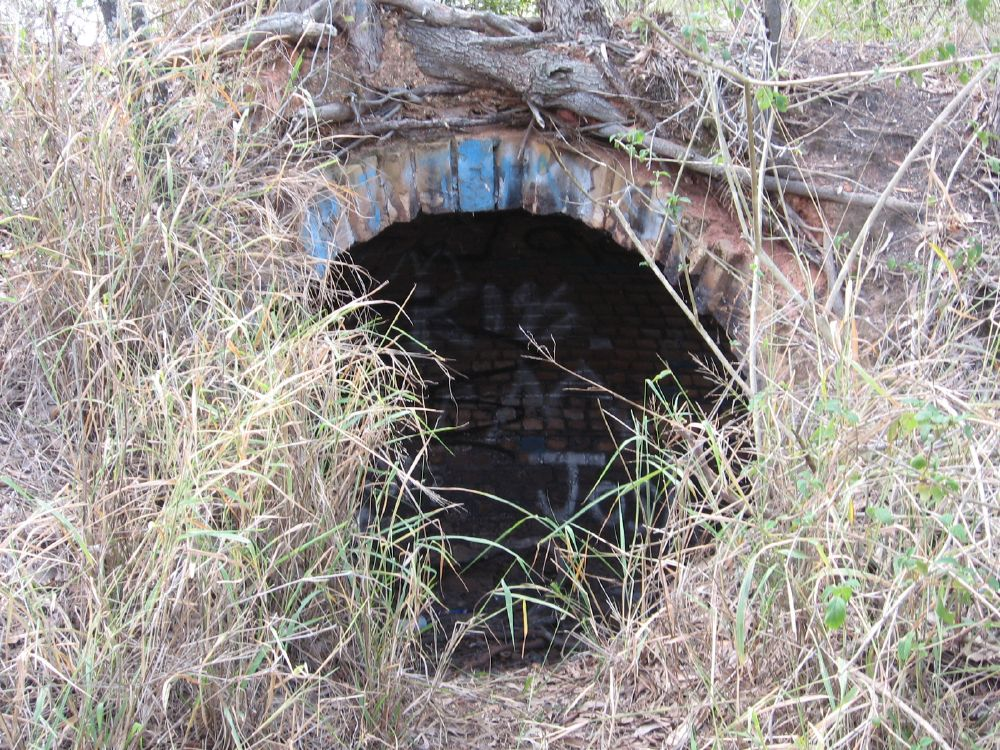
- Klondyke Coke Oven with graffiti inside, 2007

- Location within Queensland Location within Australia
- 27.593°S 152.7544°E
- Location: Parker Lane, Brassall, City of Ipswich, Queensland, Australia

Queensland Heritage Register
- Official name: Klondyke Coke Ovens, Klondyke Beehive Coke Ovens, Klondyke Coking Ovens
- Type: state heritage (archaeological)
- Designated: 3 December 2007
- Reference no.: 602566
- Significant period: 1940s (fabric); 1940s–1950s (historical use)
- Significant components: kiln, railway siding, mullock heap, coke oven, oven, wall/s – retaining

Klondyke Coke Ovens are heritage-listed beehive ovens at Parker Lane, Brassall, City of Ipswich, Queensland, Australia.It is also known as Klondyke Beehive Coke Ovens and Klondyke Coking Ovens. It was added to the Queensland Heritage Register on 3 December 2007.

== History ==
The Klondyke Coke Ovens were part of the Klondyke Colliery located at Brassall and were built in the 1940s. Coke production at Klondyke originally commenced in the 1880s. The site had two widely separated periods of coke production and several changes of ownership and names. Its last change of ownership and name occurred in 1948 when the pit had only a small area left to be worked and production ceased in the early 1950s. The site has been lying unused for many years and the coke ovens are overgrown with vegetation.

The discovery of coal in Queensland dates from 1825 when outcrops were observed by Major Edmund Lockyer on the banks of the upper Brisbane River. Two years later, when Ipswich was settled as a convict outstation, known as Limestone, the presence of coal was noted between the convict settlement and Brisbane by Captain Patrick Logan. The following year, explorer Allan Cunningham also marked several outcrops on the Bremer River on his survey map for Governor Ralph Darling.

Coal was one of the first minerals in Queensland to be commercially mined. Mining originally commenced at Goodna in 1843 with the West Moreton Coalfield at Ipswich following in the early 1850s. Development of the coal mining industry in Queensland needed to be faster and the quality could not match the quality of coal being produced at Newcastle for use by coastal steamers. However, as coal was required for transport and industrial use, there was a remarkable growth of mining to the north and east of the town from the mid-1870s onwards. A symbiotic relationship developed between Queensland Government Railways and the coal industry. Queensland Railways was the coal industry's largest customer since coal supplies were essential to the functioning of the rail network. At the same time rail transport was essential to the viability of coalmines as a coal mine could not survive commercially unless it was directly linked to the rail network. Therefore, in Queensland, development of the coal industry was closely linked to the growth of the rail network.

A by-product of coal mining was the production of coke. The production of coke was usually regarded as a somewhat unimportant side industry to the actual mining of coal. Unlike coal mining, it was not regulated by legislation and as such no systematic records were kept of the early coke production industry in Queensland. Coke is used as both a fuel and as a reducing agent in smelting iron ore and is produced from baking bituminous coal in ovens at temperatures as high as 2,000 degrees Fahrenheit. The coke ovens erected on the West Moreton Coalfield were exclusively of the beehive type, so called because of their domed appearance. Beehive coke ovens consisted of a brick dome with a small circular opening (an exit flue) at the apex, and a larger arched opening at one side to permit charging and drawing. They were usually constructed in double rows known as batteries. The space between ovens was usually filled with rubble and earth to provide insulation and the whole battery surrounded by a stone retaining wall to resist the outward thrust of the brick domes. The Klondyke ovens had a capacity of four to five tons.

Coke ovens were charged and emptied in a set pattern. Coal was shovelled into an empty oven to a height of approximately 0.6 metres (2 ft 0 in) and ignited. The door was bricked up or closed with an iron plate and plastered with a small hole left for the temporary admission of air. The upper layer of the coal burnt and initiated the distillation of volatile material from the ovens as they met the air supply drawn in through the top of the charging door. The dome was heated to a high temperature and assisted in carbonizing the charge by radiating its heat to the coal. The operation of the distillation and immediate combustion proceeded until the whole of the volatile matter in the coal had been evolved, which took about three days. The coke was then cooled by inserting a water sprinkler through the air hole in the door and was withdrawn manually with rakes. Almost two tonnes of coal was required to produce one tonne of coke.

Using beehive coke ovens for coke production was a common practice for many years. However, advances in coke production technology meant beehive coke ovens technology was outdated by the early 1900s. Despite this, beehive coke ovens continued to be built in the Ipswich coal fields well into the mid twentieth century. There are a number of possible reasons as to why this may have been the case. The more advanced technology enabled the use of coke production by-products but was a more expensive production option. It is possible that the simpler and more economical technology of the beehive style oven was sufficient for production needs on the Ipswich fields. The material and labour shortages brought about by the Second World War may also have been another factor in choosing to remain with beehive technology, they were cheap to build, bricks could be obtained to construct them and they did not require a large labour force to work them. A third possibility is that the coal pit did not have a long enough supply of coal left in it to warrant investing in expensive coke production methods.

The Klondyke Colliery was one of a number of collieries within the West Moreton Coalfield at Ipswich and was one of the longest running. Originally part of the Chuwar field, the first mine on the site, in 1871, was known as Eastwood mine after its owner, John Eastwood. The Eastwood mine was worked until 1877 and then, due to the owner's interest in other mines, laid idle for several years until it was sold to Brydon, Jones & Company in 1884, who renamed the site Mihi mine after the nearby Mihi Creek. It was at this time that the first battery of coke ovens were constructed on what would become the Klondyke Colliery site. The battery was built on the hillside above Mihi Creek and remained in use until 1891 when attention was diverted a new coal development. It was 1908 before the site was mined again, this time by Paul Francis. In 1923 Francis sold the site to a partnership of miners and a barrister who created and floated the company, Klondyke Collieries Limited.

As Klondyke Collieries Limited, coke production at the site flourished. Although it is not known exactly when coke production recommenced at the site, records state in 1942 several new coke ovens were constructed at Klondyke to meet the increased demand for coke for smelting purposes. Records show in 1945 and 1946, Klondyke and Bowen in northern Queensland were the only coke producers in Queensland with Klondyke turning out approximately a sixth of Queensland's coke production. In 1948 the site changed hands again and was renamed Moreton colliery and worked until the early 1950s which was when the pit's supply was exhausted. After the closure of the site, coke production was taken over by the nearby Haighmoor site which remained in production for a further 15 years as Queensland's only cokeworks other than Bowen.

The bricks used to construct the ovens are imprinted with a trademark "R" and appear to have come from the local brickworks, Rylance Colliery. Rylance Colliery was established in the 1880s and in 1931 expanded to include a brickworks. The company was sold in 1985 and is now known as Claypave.

The land the ovens stand on is now owned by the Department of Natural Resources and Mines. Since production at Klondyke ceased in the early 1950s, the ovens have fallen into a state of disrepair, becoming overgrown with vegetation and subject to vandalism.

== Description ==
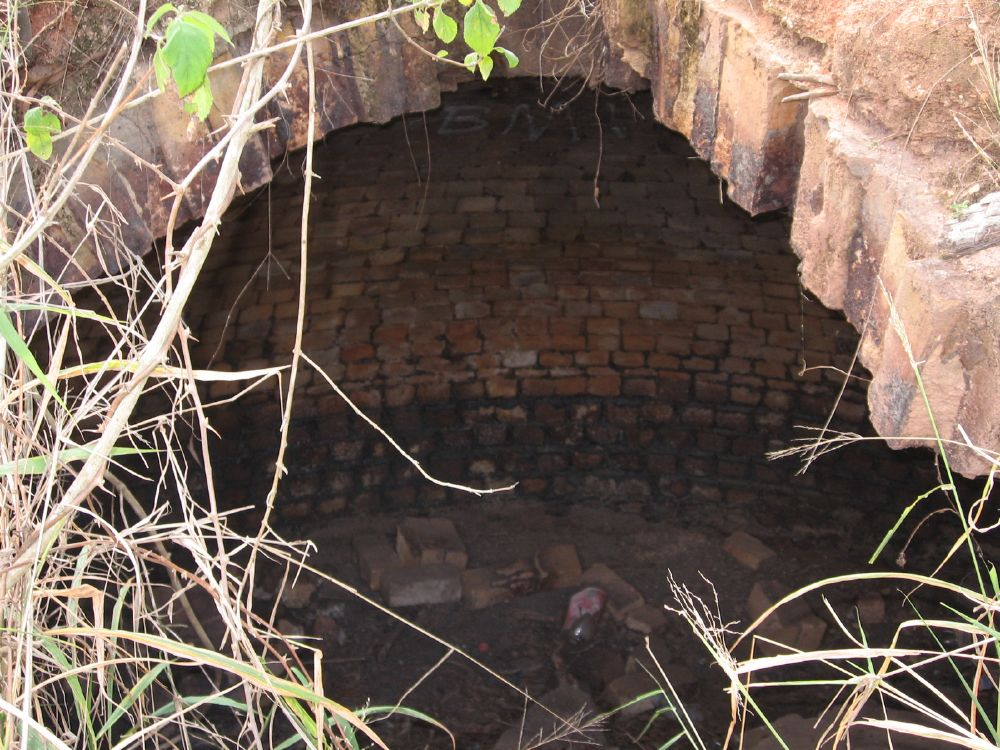
View inside the coke oven, 2007

The Klondyke Coke Ovens are located at Brassall. Access is most easily gained via the corner of W.M. Hughes and Musgrave Streets, walking down the hill and then following the pathway around to the right for approximately 200 metres (660 ft). The path splits in two, with the left (upper) fork going to the ovens and the right (lower) fork going past the brick retaining wall.

The ovens are built into the hillside above Mihi Creek and north of the nearby North Ipswich Railway Workshop area. The ovens form a large earthen covered mound of approximately 23 metres (75 ft) in length, 6 metres (20 ft) in width and 2 to 3 metres (6 ft 7 in to 9 ft 10 in) in height. The mound is heavily covered with vegetation and leaf litter. It is difficult to identify from a distance and the ovens are not visible until in close proximity.

There are twelve ovens arranged in two rows, six ovens in each row back to back. They have a domed shaped appearance. They are 3.45 metres (11.3 ft) in diameter and 1.65 metres (5 ft 5 in) in height. The ovens are constructed of brick and have individual flues. They exhibit various degrees of collapse with two ovens being completely caved in. The ovens have been subject to vandalism such as removal of bricks to form fireplaces and graffiti is evident.

The rubble used to fill between the ovens is visible in some sections and consists of a combination of bricks and various sized rocks.

On the downslope side, towards Mihi Creek, a brick wall of approximately 5 metres (16 ft) in length and between 2 and 3 metres (6 ft 7 in and 9 ft 10 in) in height, marks a drop from the mound containing the ovens down to a levelled area. The wall has been subjected to heavy graffiti.

Brick debris, coal and coke is strewn around the site as are metal remnants of machinery such as skips, railway lines, crushing machinery, trammel screens, conveyor buckets and trolley parts.

Bricks used to construct the ovens are imprinted with a large "R" in the centre of the otherwise flat, face of the brick.

== Heritage listing ==
Klondyke Coke Ovens was listed on the Queensland Heritage Register on 3 December 2007 having satisfied the following criteria.

The place is important in demonstrating the evolution or pattern of Queensland's history.

The Klondyke Coke Ovens are a good representation of the coke production industry in Queensland. They were one of only two collieries producing coke in Queensland during the 1940s. They are important in demonstrating the development of Queensland's coal mining industry and its role in the evolution of Queensland's history.

The place demonstrates rare, uncommon or endangered aspects of Queensland's cultural heritage.

The relatively intact Klondyke Coke Ovens represent a process of coke manufacture in Queensland that was once common but has since been superseded by new technology and is now uncommon.

The place has potential to yield information that will contribute to an understanding of Queensland's history.

As an industrial archaeological site and a relatively intact example of its type, the Klondyke Coke Ovens have the potential to yield information that will contribute to a greater understanding of Queensland's industrial history and will aid in comparative analysis of similar places.

The place is important in demonstrating the principal characteristics of a particular class of cultural places.

The Klondyke Coke Ovens are typical, in scale and type, of coking ovens that were common in the 19th century to the mid 20th century. They exhibit the principal characteristics of beehive coke ovens being dome shaped with individual flues and built in a row in a back-to-back pattern.
