= Railway Signal Cabin and Turntable, Ipswich =

Railway Signal Cabin and Turntable
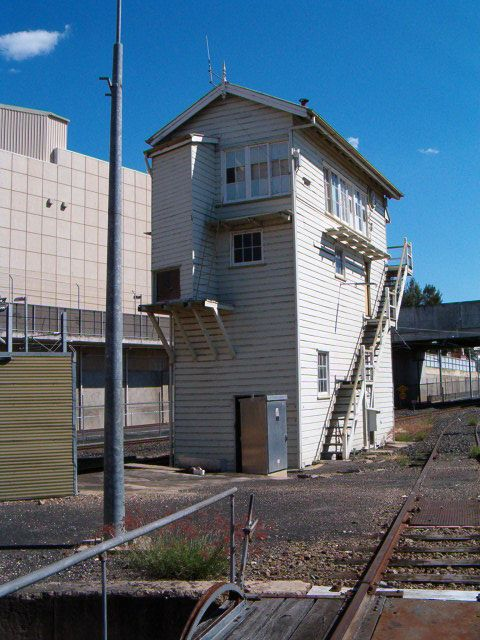
- Railway Signal Cabin and Turntable

- Location within Queensland Location within Australia
- 27.6128°S 152.7586°E
- Location: Ellenborough Street, Ipswich, City of Ipswich, Queensland, Australia

History
- Design period: 1870s–1890s (late 19th century)
- Built: 1881–1895

Queensland Heritage Register
- Official name: Railway Signal Cabin and Turntable
- Type: state heritage (built)
- Designated: 27 May 2005
- Reference no.: 602464
- Significant period: 1895–1995 (historical)
- Significant components: signals, views to, turntable, railway, clock, signal box/signal cabin/switch house/mechanical points (rail), signal mast, machinery/plant/equipment – transport – rail, views from

Railway Signal Cabin and Turntable is a heritage-listed signal box at Ellenborough Street near the Ipswich railway station, Ipswich, City of Ipswich, Queensland, Australia. It was built from 1881 to 1895. It was added to the Queensland Heritage Register on 27 May 2005.

== History ==
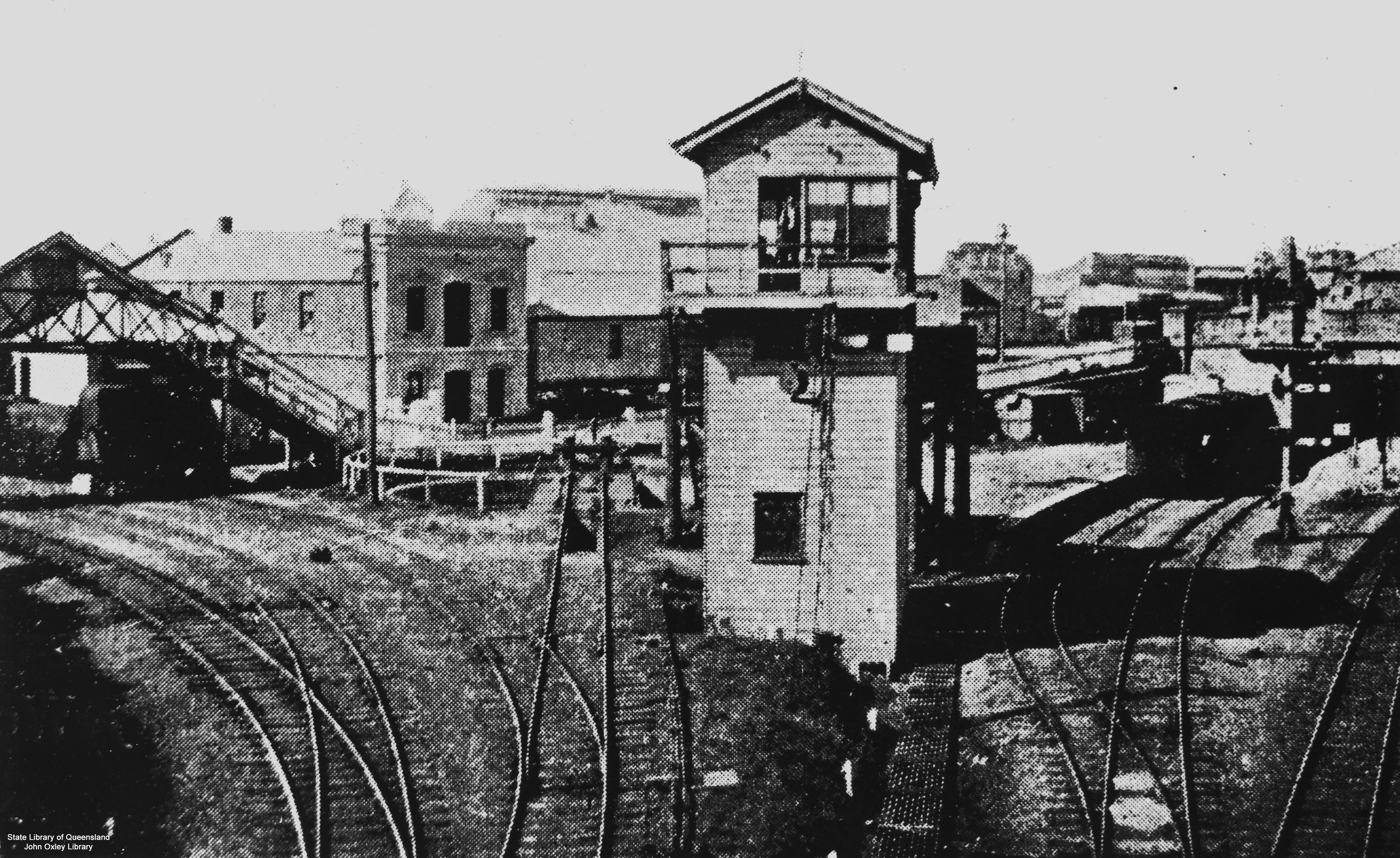
Signal cabin with turntable to the left and rear

The three-storey timber signal cabin at Ipswich containing an 1881 McKenzie and Holland mechanical interlocking signal frame and the nearby locomotive turntable and semaphore signal were once important components of the Ipswich railway station infrastructure.

The early governments of Queensland placed a high importance on providing reliable transport from the coastal cities to the productive interior regions and it was one of the motivating factors for the 1859 separation of Queensland from New South Wales.

The first railway in Queensland started from Ipswich, a provincial centre, rather than the capital Brisbane, because it was thought that river transport adequately linked Brisbane and Ipswich and that the major need was to improve transport between Ipswich and the productive Darling Downs agricultural region. Work started in early 1864 and the first section of line, from Ipswich to Grandchester, was opened in 1865, gradually extending to the Darling Downs and eventually further west. Ipswich and Brisbane were linked by rail in 1875.

Although the Ipswich railway workshops were at North Ipswich, the railway station was in the centre of the town, on the southern side of the Bremer River. The line from the station passed over a combined rail/road bridge across the river. It then passed through the workshops, continued beside the river, crossed Mihi Creek and on to Grandchester and the Darling Downs.

There have been three railway stations at Ipswich, all situated close to the same site. The first was immediately south of the Bremer River Bridge and opened on 31 July 1865. When the extension from Ipswich to Sherwood in Brisbane opened on 5 October 1874, space did not allow a direct connection and the trains had to reverse. Trains from Brisbane had to pass the junction then reversed in, while those from Toowoomba could run straight into the station but had to reverse out before continuing to Brisbane. When the Ipswich deviation was opened on 26 April 1875 it provided a direct line through Ipswich.

Where more than one train uses a railway line it is important to avoid train movements that may result in a collision. Early methods to prevent this included a Staff and Ticket relay system where a physical token was carried on the train and was passed to the next train travelling in the opposite direction before it could proceed. An Electric Staff functioning as part of an electronic system was introduced later, but operated on much the same principle. With the ongoing growth of the rail network, and where train movements have become more frequent and complex, the further evolution of safeworking has seen the development of Centralised Train Control (CTC). This is a system where the signals and points controlling movement are operated from a remote computer location. Within Queensland Rail other forms of train control are now replacing or augmenting this system also.

An interlocked yard is a railway yard where semaphore or coloured light signals are controlled in such a way that signals cannot be set to proceed unless the points that operate in conjunction with the signals are correctly set. A mechanical interlocking device is a system of rods, sliding bars and levers that are configured so that points cannot be changed in conflict, thus preventing movements that may cause a collision or other accident.

The earliest designs used various ingenious and patented methods to interlock the levers. Stevens & Sons invented a tappet system that later became almost universal but didn't renew their patent so that this system was adopted by many other manufacturers.

McKenzie and Holland (originally McKenzie, Clunes & Holland) were one of the earliest signalling contractors in Britain and supplied many railway companies, though few of these mechanisms now survive. In 1873 they introduced a new design of lever frame that would set the style of all frames to come. A dogleg on the shape of the levers allowed them to stand upright in the frame when in the normal position, which made them easier for a signalman to use. The locking mechanism was known as cam and soldier rotary locking and remained in use for many years, although later models refined the design.

At the Sydney International Exhibition in Sydney in 1880, Arthur Orpen Herbert, the Commissioner for Queensland Railway, was impressed by a display of McKenzie and Holland interlocking machines. The New South Wales Government bought the equipment on display, using it for the first installation in Australia. Queensland ordered the same equipment for Roma Street and Ipswich stations and this arrived in October 1881. Although the interlocking mechanism was a major factor in ensuring safety at busy stations, traffic on much of Queensland's railway lines was insufficient to warrant the installation of the expensive machinery required and most lines obtained safeworking by staff and ticket or a similar system. The fact that the only mechanism installed in Queensland outside Brisbane was at Ipswich suggests a high level of traffic at Ipswich and its importance as a railway centre.

At Ipswich, a contract was immediately let for a signal cabin and the interlocking was completed in late 1883. The design of this first cabin is unknown, but signal cabins in Australia have followed precedents that proved successful overseas and the current signal box generally resembles elevated cabins built by McKenzie and Holland in Britain. On 12 August 1895 a contract was let to W. Chaplain to build a new signal cabin and this is the cabin now in place. It controlled train movements between Thomas Street and East Ipswich railway stations and to the Railway Workshops across the river. The cabin is unusual in being three, rather than two storeys high, its location making this necessary, so that the signalman could see over the top of the bridge and also the main line to the west.

A contract to build a new station on the through line, in a cutting, was let to Henry Wyman on 9 March 1886. This opened on 17 October 1887. This station had one through platform with dock platforms at either end. Extensive alterations were planned and began in 1914. It was intended to include a new station building west of the original station on the through alignment between West and Waghorn Streets, though this was not built. Work completed included a subway in line with West Street, a new platform and the foundations for the proposed station. A new 60-foot (18 m) turntable was installed as part of these alterations in 1921, replacing a 41-foot (12 m) turntable that was too short to accommodate the new locomotives. Electropneumatic signalling and interlocking was to be installed, but was installed at Gympie instead, so that Ipswich retained its mechanical interlocking system. A third railway station was eventually built in 1974.

The other major feature remaining from the railway infrastructure is a locomotive turntable. Ipswich station was unusual for a major station in having only a single line, as the double track main line between Brisbane and Toowoomba was slewed to pass through the station, which only had one through platform face, other platforms being dead ends. A turntable provides for the rotation of locomotives, being a section of line mounted on a rotating platform with the operating mechanism beneath. As part of the station yard alterations in 1921, a new 60-foot (18 m) turntable was provided near the elevated signal cabin, replacing the old 41-foot (12 m) turntable that was too short for modern steam locomotives. An English Cowan Sheldon and Co Ltd no 10297 motor that was installed in 1957 operates it.

Diesel electric locomotives replaced steam locomotives on Queensland railways during the 1960s, with Ipswich being the last fully dedicated steam locomotive depot in southern Queensland. They could travel in either direction without turning so that turntables became unnecessary and many turntables and fork lines have been removed, so that they are now uncommon. The turntable at Ipswich was in use for both steam and diesel a locomotive when many locomotive hauled trains terminated there. The turntable is still a part of QR operations and is still used for turning steam locomotives.

Although Ipswich was only the second station in Queensland to have mechanical interlocking installed, it was retained long after its withdrawal from Roma Street. The technology became obsolete, as electrical interlocking or electro-pneumatic systems replaced mechanical interlocking. Computerised Centralised Traffic Control signalling systems that allow control of trains, generally from a single dedicated location up to several hundred kilometres away, now control most of the network.

The section of railway yard containing the signal cabin and turntable has been isolated from the railway station by the development of a large modern shopping centre. The signal cabin was de-commissioned in 1995.

Positioned on the former main line leading to the Ipswich Railway Workshops is a semaphore signal and mast to the north of the signal cabin, which is now a rare surviving example in Queensland on the main line.

== Description ==
The elevated timber signal cabin and adjacent turntable are situated close together to the east of the bridge across the Bremer River and are faced on three sides by the exterior walls of a large shopping centre.

The elevated signal cabin is a rectangular timber structure three storeys high. It has a gabled roof clad in corrugated iron sheeting with a timber finial at each end. The cabin houses a 55-lever T-bar interlocking machine by MacKenzie and Holland. The top-level houses the signal levers and good visibility is provided for the signalman by banks of windows to each side. The machinery to which the levers are connected is below and single windows light the two lower levels.

An external staircase on the north side gives access to a door on the second level and leads to a narrow landing on the top floor, which is shaded by a roof. The structure contains a pericope for signalmen to obtain a view under the adjoining vehicular bridges over the rail corridor. There is a Synchrome Electric clock on the northern elevation. There is also a semaphore signal mast to the north of the signal cabin.

The turntable is situated to the north east of the signal cabin. It is a standard 60-foot (18 m) table with pneumatic motor, originally powered by the Westinghouse air brake pump and system on the steam locomotive.

== Heritage listing ==
Railway Signal Cabin and Turntable was listed on the Queensland Heritage Register on 27 May 2005 having satisfied the following criteria.

The place is important in demonstrating the evolution or pattern of Queensland's history.

The Railway Signal Cabin with its mechanically interlocked signalling system and Turntable for positioning and turning steam locomotives are evidence of the development of rail transport in Queensland. As the earliest such interlocking system outside the capital, it demonstrates the importance of Ipswich as a railway centre when the establishment of a railway network was seen as the key to encouraging wider settlement in Queensland and providing reliable transport for people, goods and raw materials between the coastal cities and the productive interior regions.

The place demonstrates rare, uncommon or endangered aspects of Queensland's cultural heritage.

The McKenzie and Holland mechanism for controlling signals, and consequently train movements, was installed in 1883 as one of only two in Queensland, the other being at Roma Street in Brisbane and which has not survived. It is now rare in Australia, as very few signal boxes survive with mechanical interlocking systems in place, particularly of such an early date.

The place is important in demonstrating the principal characteristics of a particular class of cultural places.

The elevated signal cabin is the largest and best surviving example of its type, which is now rare in Queensland, as is the turntable and the semaphore signal. The signal frame is the second largest ever used in Queensland.

The place is important in demonstrating a high degree of creative or technical achievement at a particular period.

The interlocking system, semaphore signal and the locomotive turntable are good examples of an obsolete technology that was vital to the safe operation of the railway and were technically sophisticated at the time of their commissioning. The signal cabin demonstrates the characteristics of its type well, being elevated and positioned to provide commanding sightlines for the signalman. The top level has banks of windows to provide a good view and lighting. This level houses the lever frame and the level below contains the mechanism. The turntable is a good example of its type, being operational and recently serviced, and in its original location.

The McKenzie and Holland interlocking frame represents the most advanced technology available in its field at the time of its manufacture and made a major contribution to the safety of rail travel.
