= Sandstone Railway Culvert, Wulkuraka =

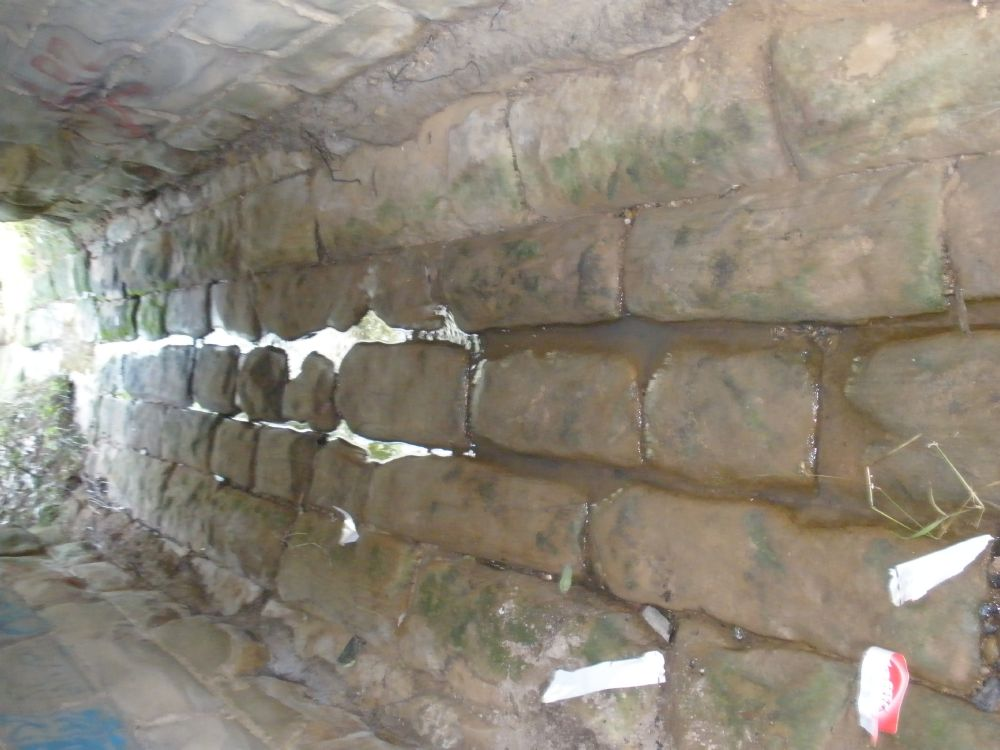
- Sandstone Railway Culvert, 2009

- Location within Queensland Location within Australia
- 27.6054°S 152.7306°E
- Location: Wulkuraka, City of Ipswich, Queensland, Australia

History
- Design period: 1840s - 1860s (mid-19th century)
- Built: c. 1865

Queensland Heritage Register
- Official name: Sandstone Railway Culvert and Remains
- Type: state heritage (built)
- Designated: 24 June 2005
- Reference no.: 602524
- Significant period: 1860s (fabric); 1865–1875 (historical use of line)
- Significant components: drain - storm water, culvert - railway, embankment - railway

The Sandstone Railway Culvert is a heritage-listed railway culvert at Wulkuraka, City of Ipswich, Queensland, Australia. It was built c. 1865. It was added to the Queensland Heritage Register on 24 June 2005.

== History ==
The separate colony of Queensland was established in 1859. The few inhabitants of the new colony looked to intensify economic exploitation of the land and increase the size of the population. The building of railways was seen to facilitate both of these aims and as such was given a high priority by the new Queensland government. Consequently, the Southern and Western Railway Bill was introduced to parliament in August 1863 and the government appointed Abram Fitzgibbon, an Irish engineer with international experience in railway construction, as Chief Engineer (later Commissioner for Railways). Fitzgibbon's first task was the construction of a railway between Ipswich and Toowoomba.

Planning for the new railway meant serious economic and geographic challenges had to be overcome. Earlier railway construction in the southern Australian colonies was modelled on the railways of Great Britain and featured broad gauge, double track, easy grades, wide radius curves and substantial station buildings. It was quickly discovered that the construction costs for such a rail system were beyond the budget of the fledgling Queensland colonial government. The natural geography around the Darling Downs also precluded an easy grade, with any railway requiring a steep ascent of the eastern escarpment of the Great Dividing Range and the crossing of several creeks and streams.

Fitzgibbon proposed a radical engineering solution to these challenges through the adoption of a narrow 3 feet 6 inches (1.07 m) gauge. Standard gauge at the time was 4 feet (1.2 m) 8½ inches (1,435 millimetres (56.5 in)) and was in itself considered narrow when compared with other broad rail gauges then in use throughout the world. By using narrow gauge, savings on construction costs could be achieved. The disadvantages of such a decision meant sharper curves on ascending ranges, lower speeds, lighter bridges and as a consequence, smaller locomotives and rolling-stock. The use of narrow gauge was largely untried anywhere else in the world, except for small-scale narrow gauge operations in New Zealand and Wales.

Substantial cost savings were also to be made through the use of standard designs for bridges, buildings, houses and yards. At this time, the quality of Queensland timber was largely unknown and little was to be used on the first railway, except for sleepers. Bridges were to be built of iron with brick and stone culverts. It was only later that Queensland became a leader in wooden bridge design, with the emergence of elaborate timber designs and later more economical timber structures.

Construction of the railway was contracted to Peto, Brassey & Betts, a firm with considerable railway construction experience worldwide. A fixed sum contract was negotiated for the construction of the first line between Ipswich and Bigges Camp (today's Grandchester), with a follow on contract for four other sections of line between Bigges Camp and Toowoomba. Lady Diamantina Bowen, wife of the first Governor of Queensland, turned the first sod of earth for the first section of railway on 25 February 1864.

The first consignment of construction materials arrived in Ipswich by steamer on 15 August 1864. An initial line was laid down to the wharf in Ipswich to receive consignments of materials and move them to a workshops site on level ground above. Public pressure for a bridge across the river resulted in a change of plan and the terminus was moved to South Ipswich in the business centre. A bridge was constructed to carry both road and rail and was just completed in time for the opening of the first section of rail to Grandchester.

The first trial run along the line with a train was on 13 April 1865. The first section of line between Ipswich and Bigges Camp (a distance of twenty-one miles) was officially opened to traffic to great public fanfare on 31 July 1865. The line ran from the Bremer Bridge and passed the original workshops and running sheds (North Ipswich Railway Workshops) to the west and crossed Wide Gully. Extensions to the line were later made to Toowoomba (1867), Dalby (1868) and Warwick (1871).

The building of the Sadliers Crossing Railway Bridge and deviation, which opened in 1875, made the old line via Mihi Creek redundant and it fell out of use except for a short section to the Ipswich workshops and to service a coalmine. The line was officially closed on 26 April 1875.

Queensland Railways demonstrated the viability of the use of narrow gauge, thereby influencing other countries including Japan, Africa and New Zealand to also adopt the technology. The construction of the Ipswich to Bigges Camp railway, of which the Sandstone Railway Culvert at Wulkuraka is a part, set the precedent for the construction and design of the many lightly constructed and sinuous narrow gauge railways that have since been built around the world.

== Description ==
The original line to Bigges Camp ran via North Ipswich roughly following the north bank of the Bremer River before crossing Mihi Creek and turning southwest towards today's Wulkuraka. The original line beyond Wulkuraka is still in use, although it has been duplicated, realigned and re-graded.

The sandstone culvert, a small brick-lined drain and the remains of railway line embankments are all found on the bushland reserve. The remains of the embankments begin in the northeastern corner of the property and end just short of the southern property boundary.

The sandstone culvert is situated in the northeastern corner of the reserve close to the property boundary. The area immediately adjacent to the culvert contains a number of trees of varying ages, and is thickly covered in tall grass and other scrub. The culvert measures approximately 2 metres (6 ft 7 in) in width and 2.5 metres (8 ft 2 in) in height. The length of the culvert from the southeastern entrance to the remains of the northwestern end is 16 metres (52 ft).

The base and lower half of the culvert is constructed of poor quality grayish sandstone to a height of approximately 1 metre (3 ft 3 in). These sandstone blocks are heavily weathered as a result of water erosion. The curved roof is made of fired red bricks built in two overlapping layers. Both the sandstone and upper brick structures feature lime mortar, which is in poor condition and is crumbling.

The southeastern end of the culvert remains intact. Inside the culvert, the middle section is largely intact though a small amount of graffiti is present on the upper brick walls. The northwestern end has disintegrated badly. At a point 10–12 metres (33–39 ft) from the Southeastern end, the lower sandstone and upper brick sections have collapsed and been washed away. Some of the scattered sandstone blocks have been pecked, suggesting that this side of the culvert was dressed for aesthetic purposes.

A small brick-lined drain is located along the railway line embankment to the southwest of the culvert. This drain is made from the same red bricks as found in the larger culvert. It is difficult to determine the overall condition of the drain as it is heavily silted up, though what is visible is in an average condition.

Significant physical elements of the place include:

- The complex created by the presence of the culvert, the remaining railway line embankments and the small brick-lined drain
- The sandstone used in the culvert, which is contemporary and probably from the same source as that used in the abutments found in the Heiner Road Railway Overpass

== Heritage listing ==
Sandstone Railway Culvert and Remains was listed on the Queensland Heritage Register on 24 June 2005 having satisfied the following criteria.

The place is important in demonstrating the evolution or pattern of Queensland's history.

The Sandstone Railway Culvert and Remains at Wulkuraka are important in demonstrating the pattern of Queensland's history as a product of the first main line railway constructed in Queensland. It illustrates the unique development of the Queensland railway network and provides tangible evidence of the geographic, demographic and economic development of the fledgling Queensland colony in the 1860s.

The place demonstrates rare, uncommon or endangered aspects of Queensland's cultural heritage.

As physical evidence of Queensland's first railway, the place is an uncommon and endangered part of Queensland's cultural heritage. The sandstone culvert was constructed in 1864–65 and is contemporary to the abutments of the Heiner Road railway overbridge (Heiner Road Railway Overpass), making it one of the few surviving remnants of the first railway ever to be constructed in Queensland. The Sandstone Railway Culvert and Remains at Wulkuraka are also significant as uncommon and endangered elements of the oldest surviving 3 feet 6 inches (1.07 m) railway found anywhere in the world.

The place has a special association with the life or work of a particular person, group or organisation of importance in Queensland's history.

The place has a special association with Abram Fitzgibbon, who made an important contribution as Queensland's first Commissioner for Railways and initiator of narrow gauge rail in Queensland. Fitzgibbon's use of narrow gauge revolutionized railway design in Queensland, Australia and throughout the world. Fitzgibbon also brought with him a number of well-qualified railway engineers, providing valuable expertise in railway construction and design, thereby shaping the development of the modern Queensland rail network.
