= List of awards and nominations received by Wentworth =

Wentworth awards and nominations
Awards and nominations
| Award | Wins | Nominations |
| AACTA Awards | 4 | 21 |
| ASTRA Awards | 4 | 14 |
| Australian Directors Guild | 1 | 4 |
| Australian Screen Editors | 0 | 2 |
| Australian Writers' Guild Awards | 1 | 6 |
| Equity Ensemble Awards | 0 | 7 |
| Logie Awards | 7 | 27 |
| National Dreamtime Awards | 2 | 2 |
| Screen Producers Australia | 1 | 7 |
| TV Tonight Awards | 5 | 13 |

Totals (Note: Certain award groups do not simply award one winner. They acknowledge several different recipients, have runners-up, and have third place. Since this is a specific recognition and is different from losing an award, runner-up mentions are considered wins in this award tally. For simplification and to avoid errors, each award in this list has been presumed to have had a prior nomination.)
- Wins: 25
- Nominations: 103
- Honours: 3

Wentworth is an Australian television drama series which premiered on 1 May 2013. The series, including its cast members and crew, have been the recipient of several awards and nominations, most notably at the Logie Awards, AACTA Awards and the ASTRA Awards.

== AACTA Awards ==
| Year | Category | Nominee | Result | Notes | Ref |
|---|---|---|---|---|---|
| 2014 | Best Television Drama Series | Wentworth | Nominated | (Note: Jo Porter & Amanda Crittenden – Wentworth: Season 1) | |
| 2014 | Best Guest or Supporting Actress in a Television Drama | Kris McQuade | Nominated | (Note: Kris McQuade for Season 1, Episode 10 – "Checkmate") | |
| 2015 (1) | Best Lead Actress in a Television Drama | Danielle Cormack | Nominated | (Note: Danielle Cormack for Season 2) | |
| 2015 (2) | Best Television Drama Series | Wentworth | Nominated | (Note: Jo Porter & Amanda Crittenden – Wentworth: Season 3) | |
| 2015 (2) | Best Lead Actress in a Television Drama | Pamela Rabe | Won | (Note: Pamela Rabe for Season 3) | |
| 2016 | Best Television Drama Series | Wentworth | Won | (Note: Pino Amenta & Jo Porter – Wentworth: Season 4) | |
| 2016 | Best Lead Actress in a Television Drama | Danielle Cormack | Nominated | (Note: Danielle Cormack for Season 4) | |
| 2016 | Best Lead Actress in a Television Drama | Pamela Rabe | Nominated | (Note: Pamela Rabe for Season 4) | |
| 2016 | Best Direction in a Television Drama or Comedy | Kevin Carlin | Nominated | (Note: Director Kevin Carlin for Season 4, Episode 12 – "Seeing Red") | |
| 2016 | Best Editing in Television | Ben Joss | Won | (Note: Editor Ben Joss for Season 4, Episode 3 − "Prisoner") | |
| 2017 | Best Television Drama Series | Wentworth | Nominated | (Note: Jo Porter & Pino Amenta – Wentworth: Season 5) | |
| 2017 | Best Lead Actress in a Television Drama | Pamela Rabe | Nominated | (Note: Pamela Rabe for Season 5) | |
| 2017 | Subscription Television Award for Best New Talent | Zahra Newman | Won | (Note: Zara Newman for Season 5) | |
| 2018 | Best Television Drama Series | Wentworth | Nominated | (Note: Jo Porter & Pino Amenta – Wentworth: Season 6) | |
| 2018 | Best Lead Actress in a Television Drama | Leah Purcell | Nominated | (Note: Leah Purcell for Season 6) | |
| 2018 | Best Guest or Supporting Actress in a Television Drama | Celia Ireland | Nominated | (Note: Celia Ireland for Season 6) | |
| 2019 | Best Television Drama Series | Wentworth | Nominated | (Note: Jo Porter & Pino Amenta – Wentworth: Season 7) | |
| 2020 | Best Television Drama Series | Wentworth | Nominated | (Note: Jo Porter & Pino Amenta – Wentworth: Season 8, Part 1) | |
| 2020 | Best Lead Actress in a Television Drama | Pamela Rabe | Nominated | (Note: Pamela Rabe for Season 8, Part 1) | |
| 2021 | Best Television Drama Series | Wentworth | Nominated | (Note: Jo Porter & Pino Amenta – Wentworth: Season 8, Part 2) | |
| 2021 | Best Lead Actress in a Television Drama | Pamela Rabe | Nominated | (Note: Pamela Rabe for Season 8, Part 2) | |

== ASTRA Awards ==
| Year | Category | Nominee | Result | Ref |
|---|---|---|---|---|
| 2014 | Most Outstanding Drama | Wentworth (Season 1) | Won | |
| 2014 | Most Outstanding New Talent | Shareena Clanton (Season 1) | Nominated | |
| 2014 | Most Outstanding Performance by a Female Actor | Danielle Cormack (Season 1) | Nominated | |
| 2014 | Most Outstanding Performance by a Female Actor | Nicole da Silva (Season 1) | Won | |
| 2014 | Most Outstanding Performance by a Female Actor | Kris McQuade (Season 1) | Nominated | |
| 2014 | Most Outstanding Performance by a Male Actor | Aaron Jeffery (Season 1 ) | Nominated | |
| 2014 | Most Outstanding Performance by a Male Actor | Robbie Magasiva (Season 1) | Nominated | |
| 2015 | Most Outstanding Performance by a Female Actor | Danielle Cormack (Season 2) | Won | |
| 2015 | Most Outstanding Performance by a Female Actor | Celia Ireland (Season 2) | Nominated | |
| 2015 | Most Outstanding Performance by a Female Actor | Nicole da Silva (Season 2) | Nominated | |
| 2015 | Most Outstanding Performance by a Female Actor | Pamela Rabe (Season 2) | Nominated | |
| 2015 | Most Outstanding Performance by a Male Actor | Aaron Jeffery (Season 2) | Nominated | |
| 2015 | Most Outstanding Performance by a Male Actor | Robbie Magasiva (Season 2) | Nominated | |
| 2015 | Most Outstanding Drama | Wentworth (Season 2) | Won | |

== Australian Directors Guild ==
| Year | Category | Nominee | Result | Ref |
|---|---|---|---|---|
| 2015 | Best Direction in a TV Drama Series | Kevin Carlin for "Into the Night" | Nominated | |
| 2018 | Best Direction in a TV or SVOD Drama Series | Fiona Banks for "Belly of the Beast" | Won | |
| 2020 | Best Direction in a TV or SVOD Drama Series | Kevin Carlin for "Under Siege: Part 2" | Nominated | |
| 2022 | Best Direction in a TV or SVOD Drama Series | Kevin Carlin for "Legacy" | Nominated | |

== Australian Screen Editors ==
| Year | Category | Nominee | Result | Ref |
|---|---|---|---|---|
| 2013 | Best Editing in a Television Drama | Philip Watts for "No Place Like Home" | Nominated | |
| 2014 | Best Editing in a Television Drama | Ben Joss for "Into the Night" | Nominated | |

== Australian Writers' Guild Awards ==
| Year | Category | Nominee | Result | Ref |
|---|---|---|---|---|
| 2015 | Best Script for a Television Series | Pete McTighe for "Fear Her" | Nominated | |
| 2015 | Best Script for a Television Series | Stuart Page for "The Governor's Pleasure" | Won | |
| 2016 | Best Script for a Television Series | Michael Lucas for "Plan Bea" | Nominated | |
| 2016 | Best Script for a Television Series | Pete McTighe for "Blood and Fire" | Nominated | |
| 2017 | Best Script for a Television Series or Miniseries | Pete McTighe for "Seeing Red" | Nominated | |
| 2021 | Best Script for a Television Series or Miniseries of More Than 4 Hours Duration, Including Original and Adapted Works | Kim Wilson for "The Unknown Terrorist" | Nominated | |

== Equity Ensemble Awards ==
| Year | Category | Nominee | Result | Ref |
|---|---|---|---|---|
| 2014 | Most Outstanding Performance by an Ensemble in a Drama Series | Cast of Wentworth (Season 1) | Nominated | |
| 2015 | Most Outstanding Performance by an Ensemble in a Drama Series | Cast of Wentworth (Season 2) | Nominated | |
| 2016 | Most Outstanding Performance by an Ensemble in a Drama Series | Cast of Wentworth (Season 3) | Nominated | |
| 2017 | Most Outstanding Performance by an Ensemble in a Drama Series | Cast of Wentworth (Season 4) | Nominated | |
| 2018 | Most Outstanding Performance by an Ensemble in a Drama Series | Cast of Wentworth (Season 5) | Nominated | |
| 2019 | Most Outstanding Performance by an Ensemble in a Drama Series | Cast of Wentworth (Season 6) | Nominated | |
| 2021 | Most Outstanding Performance by an Ensemble in a Drama Series | Cast of Wentworth (Season 8, Part 1) | Nominated | |

== Logie Awards ==
| Year | Category | Nominee | Result | Ref |
|---|---|---|---|---|
| 2014 | Most Outstanding Drama Series | Wentworth (Season 1) | Nominated | |
| 2014 | Most Outstanding Actress | Danielle Cormack (Season 1) | Nominated | |
| 2014 | Most Outstanding Newcomer | Shareena Clanton (Season 1) | Nominated | |
| 2015 | Most Outstanding Drama Series | Wentworth (Season 2) | Won | |
| 2015 | Most Outstanding Actress | Danielle Cormack (Season 2) | Won | |
| 2015 | Most Outstanding Actress | Nicole da Silva (Season 2) | Nominated | |
| 2016 | Most Outstanding Actress | Pamela Rabe (Season 3) | Nominated | |
| 2016 | Most Outstanding Drama Series | Wentworth (Season 3) | Nominated | |
| 2016 | Most Outstanding Supporting Actress | Celia Ireland (Season 3) | Won | |
| 2017 | Most Outstanding Actress | Danielle Cormack (Season 4) | Nominated | |
| 2017 | Most Outstanding Supporting Actress | Nicole da Silva (Season 4) | Nominated | |
| 2017 | Best Drama Program | Wentworth (Season 4) | Nominated | |
| 2017 | Most Outstanding Drama Program | Wentworth (Season 4) | Nominated | |
| 2018 | Most Outstanding Actress | Kate Atkinson (Season 5) | Nominated | |
| 2018 | Most Outstanding Actress | Pamela Rabe (Season 5) | Won | |
| 2018 | Most Outstanding Drama Series | Wentworth (Season 5) | Won | |
| 2018 | Most Outstanding Supporting Actress | Celia Ireland (Season 5) | Nominated | |
| 2018 | Most Popular Drama Program | Wentworth (Season 5) | Won | |
| 2019 | Most Outstanding Actor | Robbie Magasiva (Season 6) | Nominated | |
| 2019 | Most Outstanding Actress | Leah Purcell (Season 6) | Nominated | |
| 2019 | Most Outstanding Supporting Actor | Bernard Curry (Season 6) | Nominated | |
| 2019 | Most Outstanding Supporting Actress | Celia Ireland (Season 6) | Nominated | |
| 2019 | Most Popular Drama Program | Wentworth (Season 6) | Nominated | |
| 2019 | Most Outstanding Drama Series | Wentworth (Season 6) | Won | |
| 2022 | Most Popular Actor | Bernard Curry (Season 8, Part 2) | Nominated | |
| 2022 | Most Outstanding Drama Series | Wentworth (Season 8, Part 2) | Nominated | |
| 2022 | Most Outstanding Supporting Actress | Katrina Milosevic (Season 8, Part 2) | Nominated | |

== National Dreamtime Awards ==
| Year | Category | Nominee | Result | Ref |
|---|---|---|---|---|
| 2018 | Female Actor of the Year | Leah Purcell (Season 6) | Won | |
| 2019 | Female Actor of the Year | Rarriwuy Hick (Season 7) | Won | |

== Screen Producers Australia ==
| Year | Category | Nominee | Result | Ref |
|---|---|---|---|---|
| 2013 | SPA Award for Drama Series Production of the Year | Fremantle Australia (Season 1) | Won | |
| 2014 | SPA Award for Drama Series Production of the Year | Fremantle Australia (Season 2) | Nominated | |
| 2015 | SPA Award for Drama Series Production of the Year | Fremantle Australia (Season 3) | Nominated | |
| 2016 | SPA Award for Drama Series Production of the Year | Fremantle Australia (Season 4) | Nominated | |
| 2017 | SPA Award for Drama Series Production of the Year | Fremantle Australia (Season 5) | Nominated | |
| 2018 | SPA Award for Drama Series Production of the Year | Fremantle Australia (Season 6) | Nominated | |
| 2019 | SPA Award for Drama Series Production of the Year | Fremantle Australia (Season 7) | Nominated | |

== TV Tonight Awards ==
| Year | Category | Nominee | Result | Notes | Ref |
|---|---|---|---|---|---|
| 2014 | TV Tonight Award for Best New Show (Australian) | Wentworth | Nominated | (Note: Wentworth: Season 1) | |
| 2014 | TV Tonight Award for Best Australian Drama | Wentworth | Nominated | (Note: Wentworth: Season 1) | |
| 2015 | TV Tonight Award for Best Australian Drama | Wentworth | Nominated | (Note: Wentworth: Season 2) | |
| 2016 | TV Tonight Award for Best Australian Drama | Wentworth | Won | (Note: Wentworth: Season 3) | |
| 2017 | TV Tonight Award for Best Australian Drama | Wentworth | Won | (Note: Wentworth: Season 4) | |
| 2018 | TV Tonight Award for Best Australian Drama | Wentworth | Won | (Note: Wentworth: Season 5) | |
| 2019 | TV Tonight Award for Best Australian Drama | Wentworth | Won | (Note: Wentworth: Season 6) | |
| 2019 | TV Tonight Award for Blunder of the Year: Wentworth "axed" rumours | Wentworth | Nominated | (Note: Wentworth: Season 6) | |
| 2020 | TV Tonight Award for Best Australian Drama | Wentworth | Nominated | (Note: Wentworth: Season 7) | |
| 2021 | TV Tonight Award for Best Australian Drama | Wentworth | Won | (Note: Wentworth: Season 8, Part 1) | |
| 2021 | TV Tonight Award for Favourite Aussie Female | Pamela Rabe | Nominated | (Note: Wentworth: Season 8, Part 1) | |
| 2022 | TV Tonight Award for Best Australian Drama | Wentworth | Nominated | (Note: Wentworth: Season 8, Part 2) | |
| 2022 | TV Tonight Award for Favourite Female | Pamela Rabe | Nominated | (Note: Wentworth: Season 8, Part 2) | |

== TV Week Honours List ==
| Honour | Year | Character | Result | Ref |
|---|---|---|---|---|
| 2023 | TV Week 100 Greatest Australian TV Characters | Franky Doyle | 14th place | |
| 2023 | TV Week 100 Greatest Australian TV Characters | Joan Ferguson | 25th place | |
| 2023 | TV Week 100 Greatest Australian TV Characters | Bea Smith | 32nd place | |
