= Ashleigh Barty =

Australian former tennis player (born 1996)

Ashleigh Barty AO
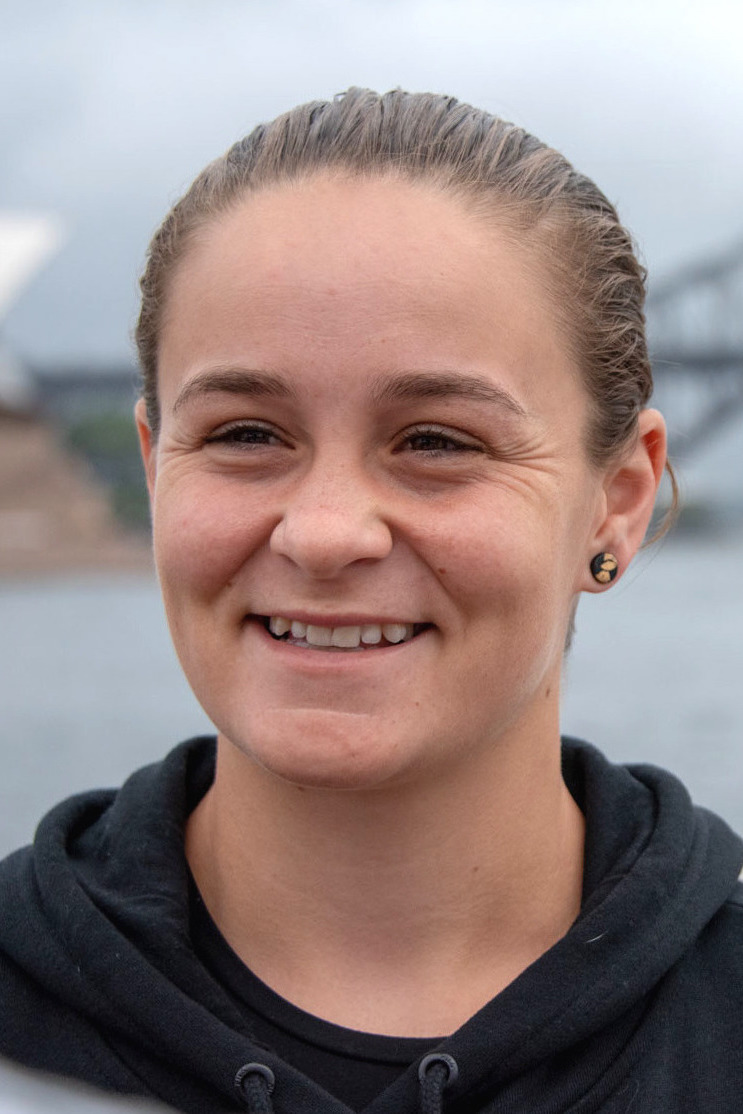
- Barty in 2019
- Full name: Ashleigh Jacinta Barty
- Country (sports): Australia
- Residence: Brookwater, Queensland, Australia
- Born: 24 April 1996 (age 30) Ipswich, Queensland, Australia
- Height: 1.70 m (5 ft 7 in)
- Turned pro: April 2010
- Retired: March 2022
- Plays: Right-handed (two-handed backhand)
- Prize money: US$23,829,071: 21st all-time in earnings

Singles
- Career record: 305–102
- Career titles: 15
- Highest ranking: No. 1 (24 June 2019)

Grand Slam singles results
- Australian Open: W (2022)
- French Open: W (2019)
- Wimbledon: W (2021)
- US Open: 4R (2018, 2019)

Other tournaments
- Tour Finals: W (2019)
- Olympic Games: 1R (2020)

Doubles
- Career record: 200–64
- Career titles: 12
- Highest ranking: No. 5 (21 May 2018)

Grand Slam doubles results
- Australian Open: F (2013)
- French Open: F (2017)
- Wimbledon: F (2013)
- US Open: W (2018)

Other doubles tournaments
- Tour Finals: SF (2018)
- Olympic Games: QF (2020)

Mixed doubles
- Career record: 7–9

Grand Slam mixed doubles results
- Australian Open: 2R (2014)
- French Open: 1R (2013)
- Wimbledon: QF (2013)
- US Open: QF (2014)

Other mixed doubles tournaments
- Olympic Games: Bronze (2020)

Team competitions
- Fed Cup: F (2019)
- Hopman Cup: RR (2013, 2019)
Medal record
Olympic Games
Representing Australia
Bronze medal – third place	2020 Tokyo	Mixed doubles

Ashleigh Jacinta Barty AO (born 24 April 1996) is an Australian former professional tennis player and cricketer. She was ranked as the world No. 1 in women's singles by the Women's Tennis Association (WTA) for 121 weeks, and was ranked world No. 5 in doubles. Barty won 12 WTA Tour-level singles titles, and three majors at the 2019 French Open, 2021 Wimbledon Championships, and 2022 Australian Open, as well as the 2019 WTA Finals. She also won 12 doubles titles, including a major at the 2018 US Open with CoCo Vandeweghe.

A successful junior, Barty was the junior world No. 2 and won the 2011 Wimbledon girls' singles title. As a teenager, Barty had early success in doubles on the WTA Tour in 2013, finishing runner-up at three major doubles events with Casey Dellacqua. Late in the 2014 season, Barty decided to take an indefinite break from tennis, playing cricket instead. She signed with the Brisbane Heat for the inaugural Women's Big Bash League season despite having no formal training in the sport.

Barty returned to tennis in 2016. She had a breakthrough year in singles in 2017, winning her first WTA Tour title at the Malaysian Open and rising to No. 17 in the world. She also had another prolific year in doubles with Dellacqua, culminating in her first appearance at the WTA Finals in doubles. Barty then won her first Premier Mandatory and major tournament titles in doubles in 2018 before accomplishing the same feat in singles in 2019, highlighted by her victory at the 2019 French Open. Barty won five more titles in 2021, including a second major singles title at the Wimbledon Championships and two WTA 1000 titles. With her title at the 2022 Australian Open on home soil, she won a major in singles on all three surfaces. Barty also led Australia to a runner-up finish at the 2019 Fed Cup and won a bronze medal in mixed doubles at the Tokyo Olympics in 2021. Barty announced her retirement from tennis in March 2022, just two months after her Australian Open title and while ranked as the world No. 1 in singles.

Barty was an all-court player with a wide variety of shots. Despite her short stature for a professional tennis player, she was an excellent server, regularly ranking among the WTA Tour's leaders in aces and percentage of service points won. She serves as the National Indigenous Tennis Ambassador for Tennis Australia. Her 114 consecutive weeks at No. 1 (not including when rankings were frozen between March and August 2020 due to the COVID-19 pandemic) is the fourth-longest streak in WTA history.

== Early life and background ==
Ashleigh Jacinta Barty, known as "Ash", was born on 24 April 1996 in Ipswich, Queensland to Josie and Robert Barty. Her father grew up in the rural North Queensland town of Bowen where he became a Queensland and Australian representative in golf and later worked for the State Library of Queensland. Her mother is the daughter of English immigrants, was a state representative for Queensland in golf in her younger years, and began working as a radiographer after retiring from golf. Through her great-grandmother, Barty is of the Indigenous Australian Ngaragu people, the Aboriginal people of southern New South Wales and northeastern Victoria. She grew up in Springfield, a suburb of Ipswich, Queensland, and attended Woodcrest State College throughout her upbringing. She has two older sisters named Sara and Ali. Besides tennis, Barty also played netball as a child, but decided to focus on tennis because she "thought netball was a girls' game" and because her sisters were better than her at that sport.

Barty started working with her longtime junior coach Jim Joyce at the West Brisbane Tennis Centre at the age of four. Joyce remarked that he did not typically train children as young as Barty, but made an exception because of her excellent hand-eye coordination and high level of focus. He recalled a moment from their first lesson, saying, "The first ball I threw to her, bang! She hit it right back." As a child, Barty also practised at home, remembering, "I used to hit the ball against [the wall exterior to our living room] every day after school, for hours on end." By the time she was nine, she was practising against boys who were six years older. At the age of 12, she was playing against male adults. She first met her mentor, Alicia Molik, at the under-12 national championships in Melbourne.

Former tennis professional Scott Draper later joined Barty's coaching team and worked with her at the National Academy. When she was 15 years old, former top 20 player Jason Stoltenberg took over as her primary coach. Barty's junior schedule took her to Europe and away from her family in Australia for much of the year. The season she turned 17, she was only home for 27 days during the entire calendar year.

== Career ==
=== Juniors ===
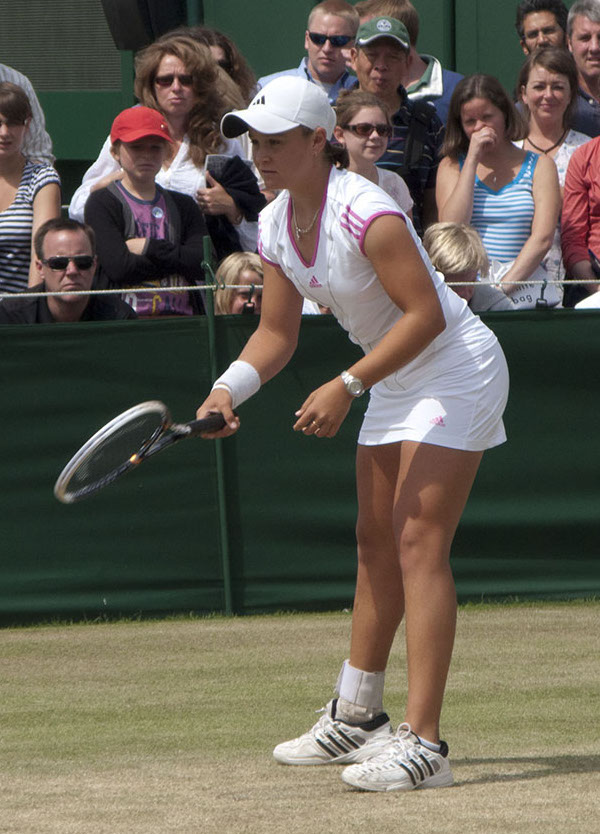
Barty at the 2011 Wimbledon Championships

Barty reached a career-high junior ranking of world No. 2, having excelled at both singles and doubles. She started playing low-level events on the ITF Junior Circuit in 2009 at the age of 13 and won her first title at the Grade-4 Australian International before turning 14. Barty continued to play only in tournaments below the higher tiers until the end of 2010, compiling a record of 24–2 in her five events that season while also capturing a Grade 2 title in Thailand. She played her first junior Grand Slam event in 2011 at the Australian Open, where she lost her opening match to third seed Lauren Davis. However, she bounced back from this defeat in the coming months by winning both the singles and doubles events at two high-level Grade 1 events, the Sarawak Chief Minister's Cup in Malaysia in March and the Belgian International Junior Championships in May.

After a second-round loss at the 2011 French Open, Barty won her only junior majors title at Wimbledon at the age of 15. She became just the second Australian to win the girls' singles event after Debbie Freeman in 1980, and the first Australian girl to win any junior Grand Slam singles title since Jelena Dokic at the 1998 US Open. Compatriot Luke Saville also won the boys' title to help Australia sweep both singles events. The only set she dropped in the tournament was to Madison Keys in the third round, and her victory in the final was against third seed Irina Khromacheva. In the last major of the year Barty produced another strong singles result, losing to top seed Caroline Garcia in the semifinals of the US Open. Barty also won two more Grade-1 titles in doubles that season, one at Roehampton the week before Wimbledon and the other at the Canadian Open the week before the US Open. She concluded the season by winning the Junior Fed Cup for Australia with teammate Belinda Woolcock. Barty only played in one junior tournament the following year, where she finished runner-up in both singles and doubles at the Torneo International in Italy.

=== 2010–2012: Australian Open debut, top 200 ===
Barty started her professional career in April 2010 just after turning 14 at an ITF Women's Circuit $25k event in her hometown of Ipswich. She lost her first match to Karolina Wlodarczak. Barty played in one more main draw that year in Mount Gambier, where she reached the semifinals in just her second professional tournament. Her first pro match win came against Ayu Fani Damayanti. In 2011, she entered three more $25k events in Australia, with her best results being two quarterfinals. Following her girls' singles title at Wimbledon, Tennis Australia awarded Barty a wildcard into qualifying at the US Open. In her first WTA Tour-level appearance, she was unable to qualify for the main draw, losing her opening round match to Julia Glushko. Barty closed out the year by competing in a playoff for one of the Australian wildcard berths into the main draw of the 2012 Australian Open. Despite being the youngest player in the competition, she won all five of her matches without dropping a set to earn the wildcard. She swept her round-robin group featuring world No. 133 Casey Dellacqua, before defeating No. 239 Arina Rodionova and No. 167 Olivia Rogowska in the knockout stage.

Barty made her singles and doubles main-draw debuts on the WTA Tour in early 2012. Her doubles debut came at the Brisbane International, the first event of the year. After losing in singles qualifying, she partnered with Dellacqua to make the semifinals in doubles while still just 15 years old. Their tournament was highlighted by an upset of the top seeded team of Natalie Grandin and Vladimíra Uhlířová, both of whom were in the top 25 of the WTA doubles rankings. The following week, Barty made her singles debut as a wildcard entrant at the Hobart International, losing her opening round match to Bethanie Mattek-Sands. She then made her Grand Slam main-draw debut the very next week at the Australian Open, where she lost her first-round match to Anna Tatishvili. Later in the year, Barty also received wildcards into the main draws of the French Open and Wimbledon, but lost her opening-round matches to Petra Kvitová and Roberta Vinci, respectively, both of whom were seeded.

Besides her first WTA Tour appearances, Barty also had a break-out year on the ITF Circuit. She compiled a singles record of 34–4 in nine tournaments to accompany a doubles record of 25–5 while frequently partnering with compatriot Sally Peers. She won four ITF titles in both singles and doubles. In particular, her first two singles titles came in back-to-back weeks in February in Sydney and Mildura. She also won both the singles and doubles events at the Nottingham Challenge, a mid-level $50k grass-court event in the lead-up to Wimbledon. Barty ended the season with a doubles title at the $75k event on carpet in Japan, where she partnered with Dellacqua for the second time for her biggest title of the year. Her quarterfinal appearance in singles at the same tournament helped her rise to No. 177 in the WTA singles rankings, having first cracked the top 200 of the WTA singles rankings a few weeks earlier at the age of 16. She also finished the year ranked No. 129 in doubles.

=== 2013–2014: Breakthrough in doubles ===
In 2013, Barty began playing primarily at the WTA Tour level. She only played in eight singles main draws in total, after losing in qualifying at five tournaments. Although she stayed outside the top 100 in singles throughout the year, she established herself as one of the world's elite double players despite not turning 17 until the middle of the season.

==== Singles: First WTA Tour, major match wins ====
Barty was awarded another wildcard into the 2013 Australian Open singles main draw, but lost her opening match. Towards the end of February, she won her first two WTA Tour-level matches at the Malaysian Open against Chanel Simmonds and Zarina Diyas, before her run ended in the quarterfinals. Barty's only other two tour-level singles wins of 2013 came at Grand Slam tournaments. She was awarded main-draw wildcards into the French Open and US Open, where she won her first round matches at both events.

Barty began the 2014 season by qualifying for the Brisbane International. She won her opening-round match against No. 33, Daniela Hantuchová, before withdrawing from the tournament due to a left adductor injury. This came to be her only singles main draw win of the year at any level. She played in three Grand Slam main draws, including at the US Open where she had to qualify, but lost all of her first-round matches.

==== Doubles: Three major finals, first career title ====
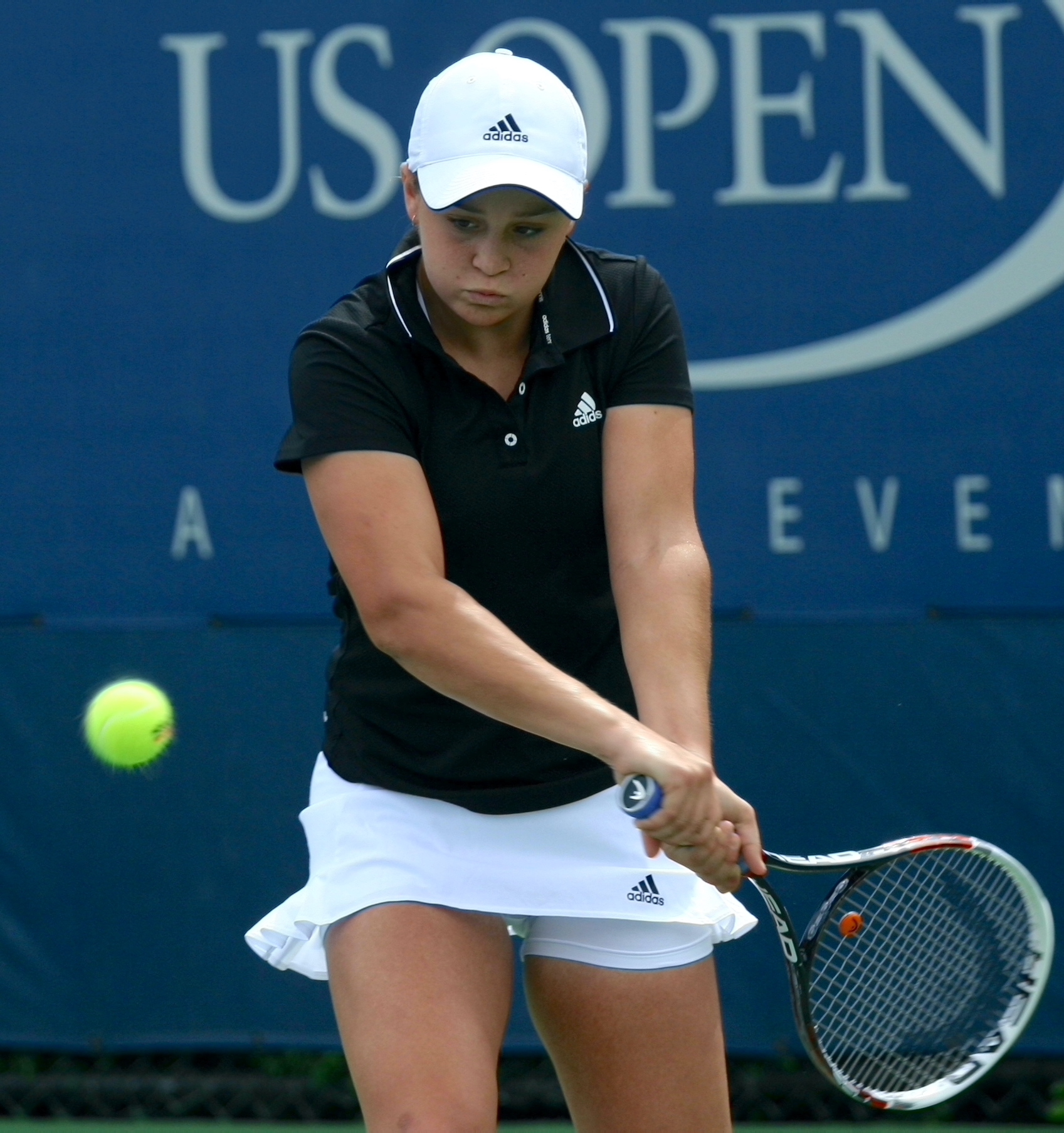
Barty at the 2013 US Open

In doubles, Barty partnered with Dellacqua in eight WTA Tour-level events during the 2013 season, including all four Grand Slam tournaments. The pair finished runner-up in three out of four such events, only failing to reach the final at the French Open, where they lost in the first round. At the age of 16, Barty's Australian Open final appearance made her the youngest majors finalist since Tatiana Golovin won the mixed doubles title at the 2004 French Open at the same age. As a team, Barty and Dellacqua became the first Australian duo to reach an Australian Open women's doubles final since Evonne Goolagong and Helen Gourlay in 1977. This success also helped Barty advance nearly 100 spots in the world rankings to No. 46. At Wimbledon and the US Open, Barty and Dellacqua defeated three of the top-ten seeds at both events, including the No. 2 seeds in each case. The closest they came to winning a major title was at the Australian Open and the US Open, where they were up a break with a set in hand in both finals.

Barty and Dellacqua did win one title together at the Birmingham Classic, where they defeated Cara Black and Marina Erakovic in the final. Without Dellacqua as her partner, Barty had also made two more tour-level semifinals earlier in the year, including at the Premier-level Charleston Open with Anastasia Rodionova. She finished the season as the world No. 12 in the doubles rankings.

Despite her struggles in singles in 2014, Barty had another good year in doubles with Dellacqua as her regular partner. The pair won their second title together at the Internationaux de Strasbourg during the clay season. While they did not repeat their success at the Grand Slam tournaments from the previous year, they still managed to reach the quarterfinals at both the French Open and Wimbledon. However, they failed to defend their title at the Birmingham Classic but they made it to the final for the second consecutive year.

=== Tennis hiatus – switch to cricket ===
Ashleigh Barty
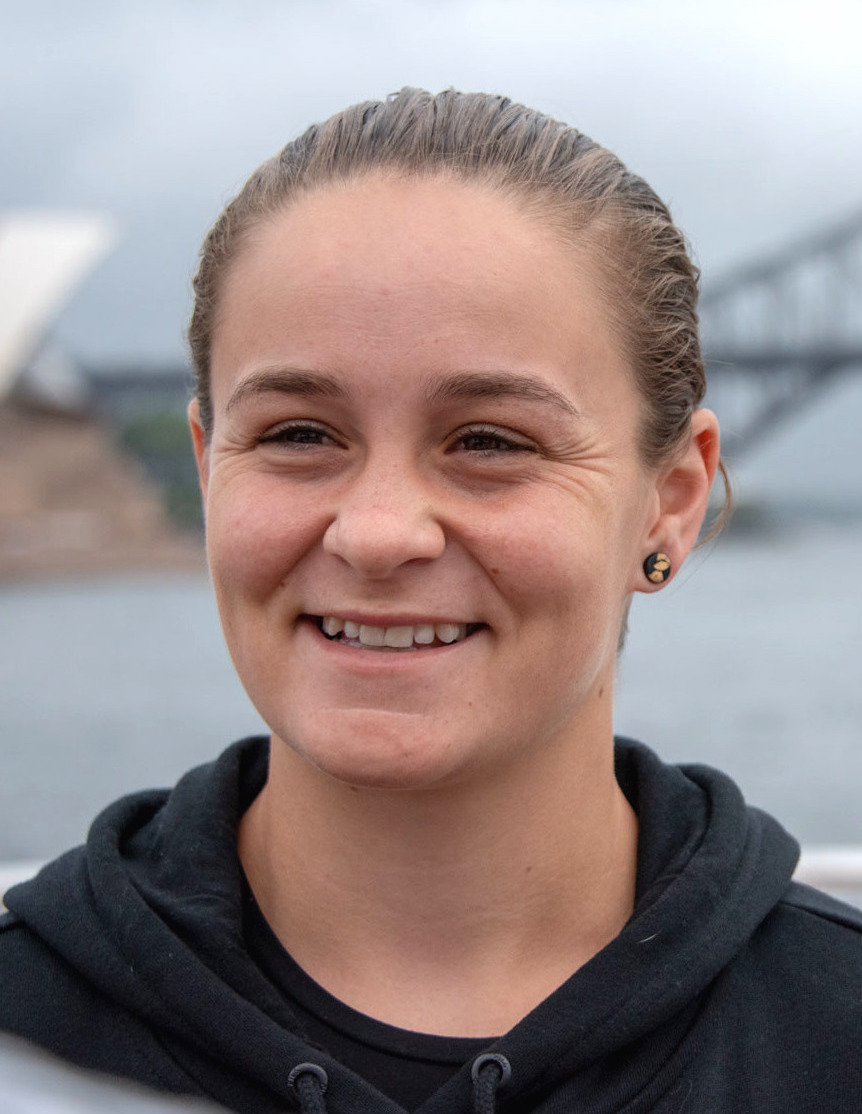
- Barty in 2019

Cricket information
- Batting: Right-handed
- Bowling: Right-arm medium

Domestic team information
- Years: Team
- 2015/16: Queensland
- 2015/16: Brisbane Heat

Career statistics
Competition	List A	T20
Matches	2	9
Runs scored	11	68
Batting average	5.50	11.33
100s/50s	0/0	0/0
Top score	10	39
Catches/stumpings	1/–	3/–
- Source: CricketArchive, 16 January 2016

After the 2014 US Open, Barty announced she was "[taking] a break from professional tennis". She later said that she took time off from tennis because "it was too much too quickly for me as I've been travelling from quite a young age... I wanted to experience life as a normal teenaged girl and have some normal experiences." Barty was ranked outside of the top 200 in singles and was No. 40 in doubles at the time.

Barty became interested in potentially playing cricket after meeting with the Australian women's national team in early 2015 to discuss her experience as a professional athlete. She was intrigued by the opportunity to play a team sport as a change from the individual sport of tennis. At the time, she had no competitive cricket experience, having only played casually with her family. Barty later approached Queensland Cricket about how she could get involved with the sport. Andy Richards, the coach of the Queensland Fire and soon-to-be coach of the Brisbane Heat, was immediately impressed with Barty's skill set, saying, "Her skill from the first time she picked up a bat was outstanding from a coach's perspective... She never missed a ball in her first session... That's what attracted me as a coach to her as a player, her ability to pick up things really quickly."

Barty began training with the Fire in July, and also started playing for the Western Suburbs District Cricket Club, a local team that competes in Brisbane's Women's Premier Cricket Twenty20 league. She had an impressive second game for the team, scoring 63 from 60 balls to go along with taking 2–13 from four overs. Barty played in 13 matches for Western Suburbs, scoring one century and averaging 42.4 runs while taking eight wickets. Western Suburbs ultimately won the league's grand final, with Barty ending up the team's top scorer in the match after hitting 37 from 39 balls.

After Barty's performance in her second game with Western Suburbs, she also signed with the Heat for the inaugural Women's Big Bash League (WBBL) Twenty20 season. Barty made her debut in December and hit 39 off 27 balls with one six in a match against the Melbourne Stars, the second highest score on her team. She remained a regular member of the team, but only had a double figure score once more during the season. The Heat finished with a 7–7 record, good for sixth out of eight teams in the competition. The WBBL season ended in January, while the local Brisbane league ended in February.

=== 2016–2018: Tennis return, US Open doubles champion ===
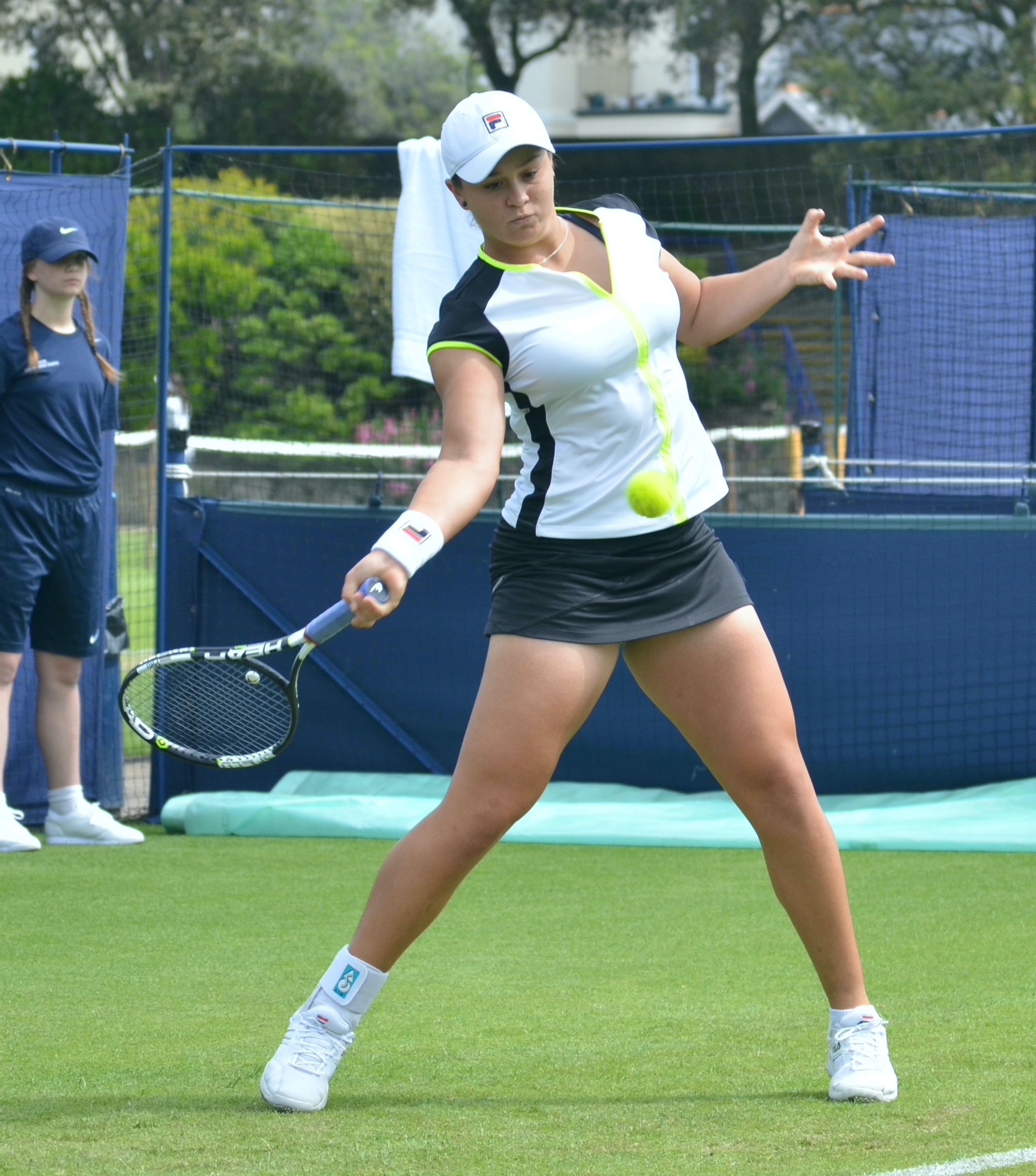
Barty at the 2016 Eastbourne Trophy

Barty announced her return to professional tennis in February a few weeks after the end of the WBBL season, and began working with Craig Tyzzer as her coach. Barty initially only competed in doubles events on the ITF Circuit at the $25k-level. In her first two months, she played five tournaments and won three of them, including her first one back where she partnered with Jessica Moore and two in back-to-back weeks in Canberra.

Barty returned to singles in late May. She qualified for the Eastbourne Trophy, a $50k event, where she made it to the semifinals in both singles and doubles. The following week, Barty returned to the WTA Tour and qualified for the Nottingham Open. She made it to the quarterfinals, losing to top seed Karolína Plíšková in a close match. She was happy with her performance, saying, "It's nice to know that straight off the bat I can come in and compete with the best in the world." Barty also received a wildcard into qualifying at Wimbledon, but did not reach the main draw. After a bone stress injury in her arm, she only played in one more event that year, the WTA 125 Taipei Challenger in November.

==== Singles: First WTA Tour title, Elite Trophy, world No. 15 ====
At the start of the 2017 season, Barty picked up her first career wins at the Australian Open after entering with a wildcard, reaching the third round. Barty's next tournament was the Malaysian Open, where she had won her first WTA Tour singles match four years earlier. She entered the singles main draw as a qualifier and won both the singles and doubles events. This was her first career singles title and helped her enter the top 100 for the first time. Barty continued to climb the rankings after a quarterfinal showing at the Internationaux de Strasbourg on clay, where she lost to compatriot Daria Gavrilova, and a runner-up at Birmingham on grass, her best result at a Premier tournament.

During the US Open Series in August, Barty reached back-to-back Premier-5 rounds of 16 at the Canadian Open and the Cincinnati Open, despite needing to qualify for both events, and notched her first career top-10 victory at the latter defeating world No. 9, Venus Williams. After losing in the opening rounds of the French Open and Wimbledon, Barty took advantage of a slightly better draw at the US Open, as she defeated Ana Konjuh in her first match en route to reaching the third round, where she lost to the eventual champion, Sloane Stephens. This performance brought her to No. 37 in the WTA rankings.

Later in the year, Barty produced her best result of the season by reaching her first Premier-5 final at the Wuhan Open. During the tournament, she defeated three top-ten players in No. 7 Johanna Konta, No. 4 Karolína Plíšková and No. 10 Jeļena Ostapenko, but lost in the final to Caroline Garcia in three sets, despite having two chances to serve for the match. Nonetheless, she rose to No. 23 in the world, setting her up both to become the top-ranked Australian a few weeks later and to qualify for the WTA Elite Trophy at the end of the season. At that event, Barty advanced out of her round-robin group by winning both of her matches, but she was eliminated from the tournament by CoCo Vandeweghe. Barty finished the season at a career-high ranking of No. 17 in the world.

Barty had a strong start to the 2018 season, reaching the final of the Sydney International and being seeded at a Grand Slam tournament for the first time at the Australian Open, but was upset in the third round by Naomi Osaka. Barty's best result during the clay-court season was at the Internationaux de Strasbourg, where she was the top seed at a WTA Tour singles event for the first time. She reached her first tour-level clay-court semifinal, but had to retire due to a back injury. The following week at the French Open, Barty had another tough draw at a Grand Slam event and was defeated by Serena Williams in the second round, despite winning the first set.

Back on her favourite surface, Barty won the Nottingham Open on grass for her second career title. She defeated home favourite and British No. 1, Johanna Konta, in the final. She then recorded her first match wins at Wimbledon and reached the third round, matching her best result at a major tournament. At the start of the summer hardcourt season, Barty did well at the Premier 5 events, making it to the semifinals at the Canadian Open and the third round at the Cincinnati Open. She lost to world No. 1 Simona Halep at both events. At the US Open, Barty was the 18th seed and reached the fourth round at a Grand Slam tournament for the first time, where she was defeated by Karolína Plíšková.

Towards the end of the season, Barty attempted to defend her previous year's finals appearance at the Wuhan Open. Although she was the only seeded player to make the semifinals, she fell one match short against Aryna Sabalenka. Having maintained her top 20 ranking, she was able to qualify for the year-end Elite Trophy for the second straight season. Barty was grouped with Sabalenka and Caroline Garcia and began play by losing to Sabalenka again, while winning eight games. She then defeated Garcia in straight sets while only conceding seven games, meaning she could only advance if Garcia defeated Sabalenka in straight sets while losing at least eight games. Garcia won the group's final match while dropping precisely eight games to send Barty into the knockout rounds. Barty then defeated defending champion Julia Görges and home favourite Wang Qiang to win the biggest title of her career and end the season at a career-high ranking of No. 15 in the world.

==== Doubles: First major and Premier Mandatory titles, world No. 5 ====
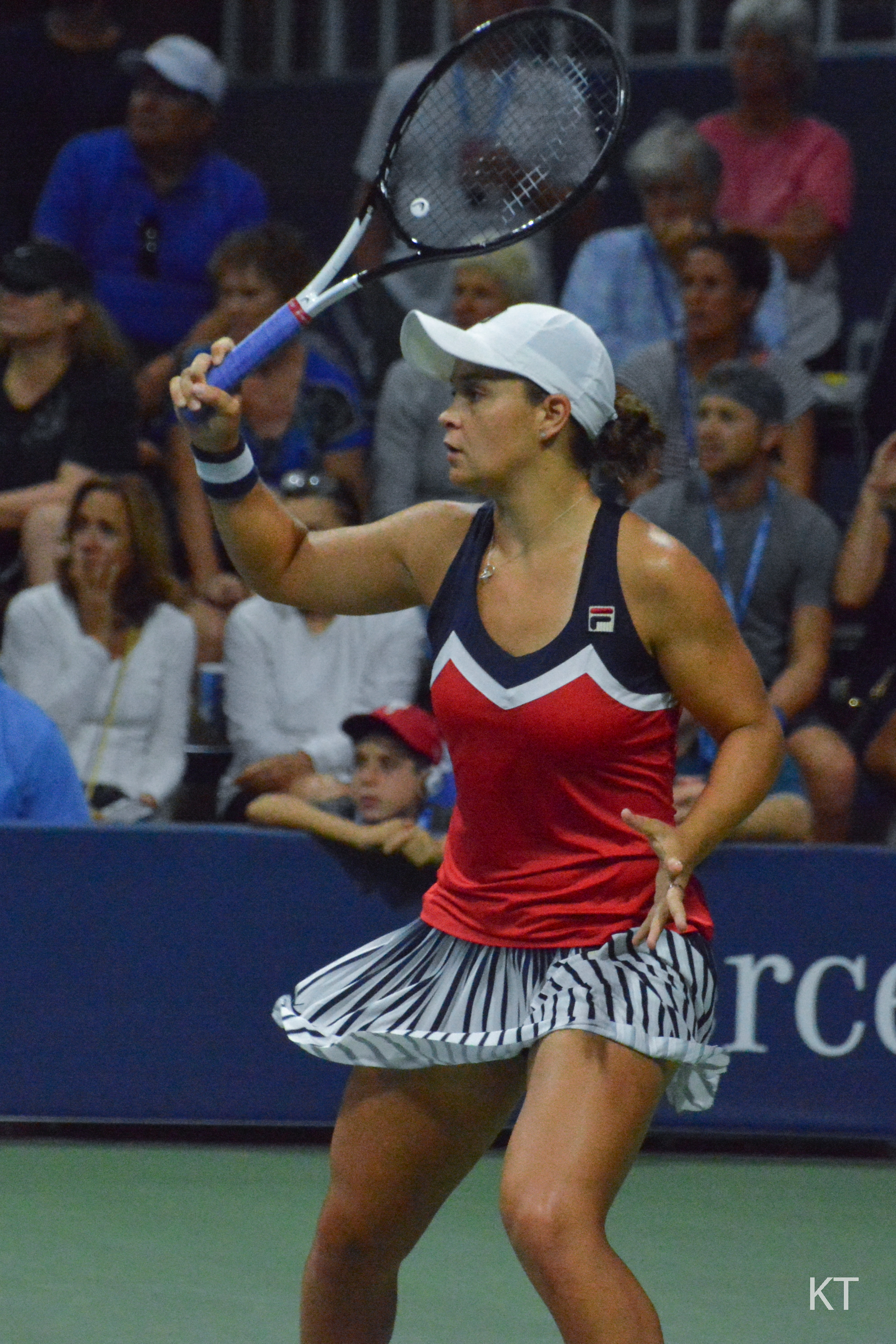
Barty at the 2018 US Open

In 2017, Barty reunited with Dellacqua as her regular doubles partner, and reached the quarterfinals or better at three out of four Grand Slam tournaments during the season. In particular, they made it to the finals at the French Open to become the first Australian women's doubles team to reach all four major finals. They lost in the final to the top seeded team of Mattek-Sands and Lucie Šafářová, who had also won the previous two majors. Barty and Dellacqua contested six finals on the year in total, winning half of them. They won the Birmingham Classic, where Barty also made it to the final in singles. This was their second career title at the event after winning it in 2013, and also their first Premier title together.

Barty and Dellacqua finished the year as the third-highest ranked doubles team, earning them a spot in the WTA Finals. They had narrowly missed qualifying for the event in 2013 when they were the fifth-ranked team and only the top four were accepted instead of eight. In their debut, the duo were upset in the first round by the lowest-seeded team of Kiki Bertens and Johanna Larsson. Individually, Barty also established a new career-high doubles world ranking of No. 11 towards end of the season.

Barty and Dellacqua reached the third round at the Australian Open. This was their last tour tournament together before Dellacqua's retirement. Barty partnered with CoCo Vandeweghe in her next three doubles events, and the pair had their best success in the United States where they won the Miami Open, Barty's first Premier Mandatory title. Although Barty continued to play primarily with Vandeweghe during the rest of the season, she also played two Premier 5 tournaments with Demi Schuurs, after her usual partner Elise Mertens withdrew from the Italian Open. Barty and Schuurs won both of their tournaments together, the Italian Open and the Canadian Open. The first also helped Barty climb to a career-best WTA doubles ranking of No. 5.

Later in the season, Barty reunited with Vandeweghe and won her first career Grand Slam title at the US Open. In the semifinals, the pair defeated the top seeded team of Barbora Krejčíková and Kateřina Siniaková, who were the reigning French Open and Wimbledon champions. In the final, they defeated the second seeded team of Tímea Babos and Kristina Mladenovic, who were the reigning Australian Open champions. Barty and Vandeweghe lost the first set and were down two championship points in the second set before coming from behind to win the last two sets in two tiebreaks, saving a third championship point in the final tiebreak. This was the first time ever that a Grand Slam women's doubles final came down to a third-set tiebreak.

Even though Barty and Vandeweghe only played seven tournaments together, their two big titles were enough for them to qualify as the eighth and last seed into the WTA Finals. They upset Barty's other doubles partner Schuurs, who was back with Mertens, in the first round. Their tournament was ended by Babos and Mladenovic in the semifinals in a rematch of the US Open final.

During this time Barty worked with a mindset coach, Ben Crowe. She has also stated that she viewed Evonne Goolagong as her mentor and idol.

=== 2019–2020: French Open champion, singles No. 1 ===
==== Singles: Major title, WTA Finals champion ====
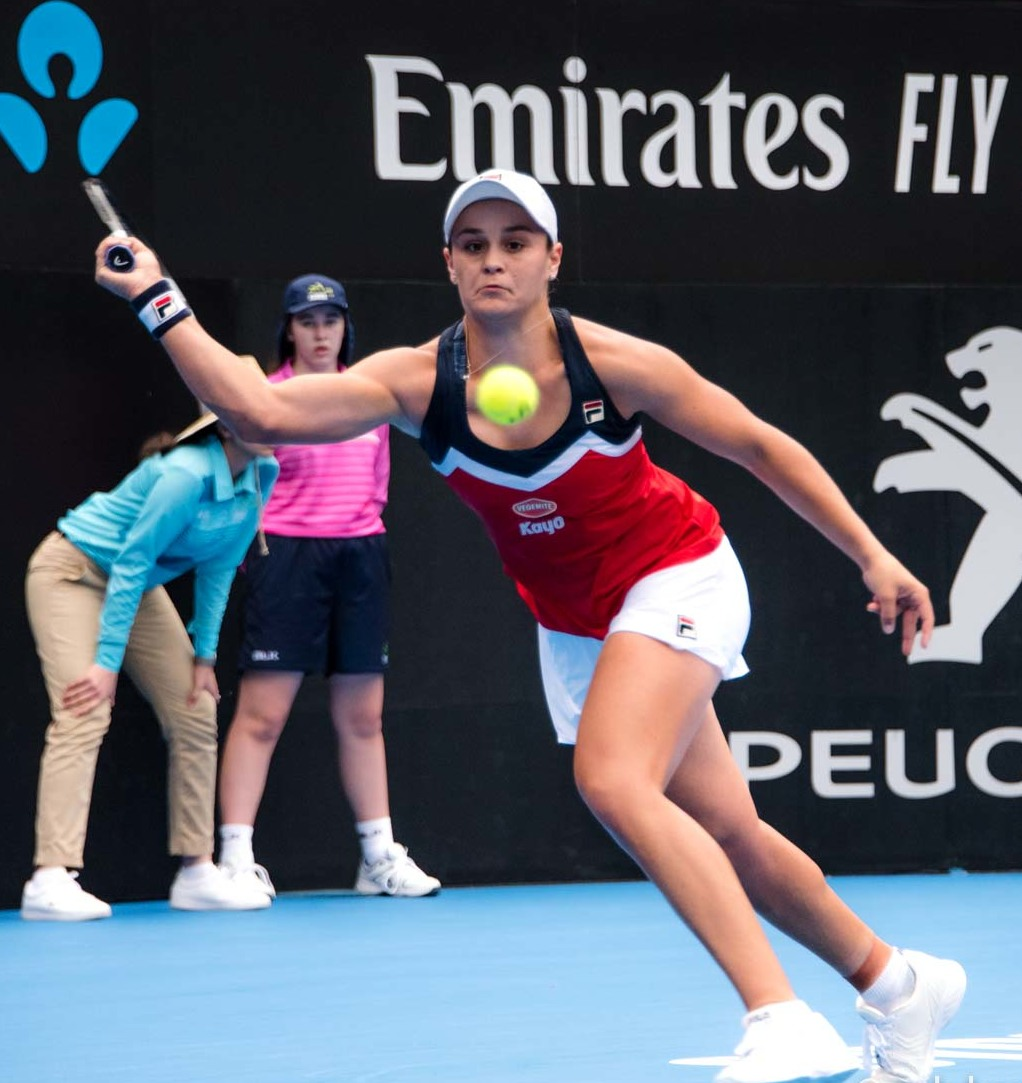
Barty at the 2019 Sydney International

For the second consecutive year, Barty began the season with a runner-up finish at the Sydney International, this time losing to Petra Kvitová. During the event, she defeated three top 15 players, including Simona Halep for her first career victory over a current world No. 1 player. At her next tournament, Barty made her first Grand Slam quarterfinal at the Australian Open, defeating Maria Sharapova before again losing to Kvitová, becoming the first Australian to make the quarterfinals at the event since Jelena Dokic in 2009. After a fourth round appearance at the Indian Wells Open, Barty won the Miami Open for her first Premier Mandatory title. She defeated three top-10 players in the event, including No. 2 Kvitová in the quarterfinals and No. 7 Plíšková in the final. With this result, she also made her top-10 debut.

In the lead-up to the French Open, Barty played only two clay court events. Her best result was a quarterfinal at the Madrid Open, where she lost to Halep. She closed out the clay court season by winning her first Grand Slam singles title at the French Open, defeating Markéta Vondroušová in the final, dropping just four games. With the title, Barty became the first Australian to win the French Open in singles since Margaret Court in 1973 and the first Australian to win a Grand Slam singles title since Sam Stosur at the 2011 US Open. She also rose to No. 2 in the world. Barty then followed up this title with another at her next event, the Birmingham Classic, to become the No. 1 ranked player in the world. She was the second Australian to be No. 1 in the WTA singles rankings after Evonne Goolagong Cawley. Barty's win streak came to an end at 15 matches when she was defeated at Wimbledon by Alison Riske in the fourth round.

Barty lost the No. 1 ranking to Naomi Osaka in early August, after an opening round loss at the Canadian Open. The following week, she fared better at the Cincinnati Open, falling to Svetlana Kuznetsova in the semifinals. At the US Open, she was upset in the fourth round for the second time in a row at a Grand Slam tournament, this time to Wang Qiang. Nonetheless, she regained the No. 1 ranking, and rebounded during the Asian hard court season. She reached another semifinal at the Wuhan Open followed by a runner-up finish to Osaka at the China Open. At the end of the season, Barty made her singles debut at the WTA Finals as the top seed. After defeating Belinda Bencic and losing to Bertens, Barty defeated Kvitová to advance out of her group. In the knockout round, she defeated Karolina Plíšková and Elina Svitolina, the latter of which for the first time in six attempts, to win the tour finals. With the title, she won $4.42 million, the largest amount of prize money at a single men's or women's tournament in tennis history to date. Barty finished the season as the world No. 1 and won the WTA Player of the Year award, becoming the first Australian to ever receive this honour.

Barty started her 2020 season in her hometown, at the Brisbane International, but picked up a disappointing second round loss against qualifier Jennifer Brady. However, she bounced back and captured her first title on home soil at the Adelaide International, defeating Dayana Yastremska in the final. After this, Barty entered the Australian Open as one of the favourites to win the title, and as the first Australian woman to ever play the tournament while being the WTA world No. 1. She lost in the semifinals to eventual champion Sofia Kenin, despite having two set points in each of the sets played. Nevertheless, Barty became the first Australian woman to reach the semifinals since Wendy Turnbull in 1984 and picked up her first top ten win at a major (quarterfinals over Kvitová).

After taking a rest break, Barty returned to court making her debut at the Qatar Ladies Open, the first Premier 5 tournament of the year, where she lost to Kvitová in the semifinals. She next headed to Indian Wells, but play was suspended before the tournament began due to the COVID-19 pandemic. WTA tournaments resumed in August, but Barty decided to skip the rest of the year due to concerns related to travelling within the pandemic, which included deciding not to try to defend her French Open crown. She finished as the year-end world No. 1 for the second consecutive season due to the change of criteria in the WTA rankings.

==== Doubles: Premier 5 title, US Open runner-up ====
With CoCo Vandeweghe injured, Barty began to regularly partner with Victoria Azarenka. The pair reached the semifinals at the Miami Open and won their first title together at the Italian Open, a Premier 5 event. They defeated the top seeded team of Krejčíková and Siniaková in both tournaments. During the summer, they reached another Premier 5 semifinal at the Canadian Open, this time losing to Krejčíková and Siniaková who were again the top seeds. Barty came close to defending her title at the US Open. In the quarterfinals, she and Azarenka defeated top seeds Babos and Mladenovic, Barty's opponents in the 2018 final. They made the final, but lost in straight sets to Mertens and Sabalenka. Although they only played eight tournaments during the season, they nearly qualified for the WTA Finals, falling one spot short in ninth place.

=== 2021–2022: Return from hiatus, major titles ===
==== Singles: Wimbledon and Australian Open champion, 100 weeks at No. 1 ====
After a self-imposed 11-month hiatus due to the COVID-19 pandemic, Barty returned to the tennis courts at the Yarra Valley Classic, one of the three lead-up tournaments to the Australian Open, where she defeated Garbiñe Muguruza in two tight sets in the final. After this, Barty entered the Australian Open as the first seed in the draw for the second consecutive year and projected as one of the favourites to claim the title, but was knocked out by Karolína Muchová in the quarterfinals. Barty played her first tournament outside Australia in more than a year at the Miami Open, where she was the defending champion from 2019. She had to save a match point in her opening match, but then recorded her first top-10 wins of the year against Aryna Sabalenka and Elina Svitolina to reach her second Miami Open final in a row. Barty defended her title by defeating Bianca Andreescu in the final after Andreescu retired from the match. She became the first No. 1 seed to win the Miami Open since Serena Williams in 2015. This was also Barty's first time defending a title in singles.

Barty began the European red clay swing with her debut at the Stuttgart Open, where she won her third title of the year, and continued her clay-court success by posting her best result at the Madrid Open, where she lost to Sabalenka in the final. However, she was forced to retire at both the Italian Open and the French Open due to injuries that prevented her from playing any lead-up grass-court tournaments and delayed her comeback until Wimbledon. There, Barty beat former world No. 1 and 2018 champion, Angelique Kerber, to reach the final, where she defeated Karolína Plíšková, becoming the first Australian woman to win the title since Evonne Goolagong Cawley in 1980, and the first top seed to win since Serena Williams in 2016.

At the Summer Olympics women's singles tournament, Barty lost in the first round to Sara Sorribes Tormo in straight sets. At the Cincinnati Open, she won the title without dropping a set defeating Jil Teichmann in the final. At the US Open, Barty was the favourite to take the title, but was defeated by Shelby Rogers in the third round. After that, she decided to come back to Australia and skip the rest of the season. Nevertheless, Barty achieved the year-end world No. 1 ranking for the third year in a row, matching the feat of Chris Evert, Martina Navratilova, Steffi Graf and Serena Williams, and received the WTA Player of the Year award for the second time.

Barty began 2022 at the Adelaide International. She went on to win the title, beating defending champion Iga Świątek and Elena Rybakina in straight sets. At the Australian Open, Barty reached the final losing only one service game and defeated Danielle Collins to become the first Australian woman since Chris O'Neil in 1978 to win the Australian Open. She also became the eighth female player to win a major in three different surfaces, joining Serena Williams as the only two active players at that point to have achieved that feat. Barty did not drop a set during the tournament.

==== Doubles: Spare play, Olympic bronze ====
In 2021, Barty started to partner with Jennifer Brady. They were not able to play many tournaments during the first half of the year, as they had to withdraw from both the Australian Open and the French Open due to injuries, but managed to win the title in Stuttgart. This was Brady's maiden doubles title, and Barty's first one since 2019. At the 2020 Olympics, Barty partnered Storm Sanders in the women's doubles and reached the quarterfinals, where they were beaten by top-seeded Krejčíková and Siniaková, and fellow major champion John Peers in the mixed doubles, where they went on to become bronze medalists.

At the start of the 2022 season, Barty entered the doubles tournament in Adelaide alongside Sanders and won the title, defeating Darija Jurak Schreiber and Andreja Klepač in the final, subsequently completing the Adelaide sweep. It was the third time Barty won the singles and doubles at the same tournament.

=== Retirement ===
On 23 March 2022, Barty announced her retirement from tennis. In an interview with her friend and former doubles partner, Casey Dellacqua, Barty said, "I don't have the physical drive, the emotional want and everything it takes to challenge yourself at the very top of the level any more. I am spent." Barty became the second player to retire while holding the No. 1 ranking after Justine Henin (Henin briefly returned to the WTA Tour 20 months after retiring). In her autobiography, My Dream Time, Barty detailed that after winning Wimbledon, "the one true dream that I wanted in tennis", she started to lose her motivation to keep playing. In 2022, Barty also took up a role as "chief of inspiration" with the Australian telephone company Optus.

Upon retirement, Barty donated three of her Grand Slam tournament outfits to the State Library of Queensland to be preserved as part of their collection. The outfits are from the 2019 French Open, the 2021 Wimbledon tournament and the 2022 Australian Open.

In November 2026, it was announced that Barty would be inducted into the International Tennis Hall of Fame in August 2027.

== National representation ==
=== Fed Cup ===
Barty also made her Fed Cup debut for Australia in 2013 at the age of 16, playing in two away ties. In their February defeat to the top-seeded Czech Republic, she lost the dead rubber doubles match with Dellacqua. Two months later against Switzerland, Barty won her only match against No. 56 Stefanie Vögele to clinch the tie for Australia and keep them in the top-level World Group the following year.

Barty played in two Fed Cup ties for Australia in 2018. In their February tie against Ukraine, she won both of her singles matches as well as the deciding doubles rubber with Dellacqua to carry her team into the World Group playoffs. This turned out to be the last match Barty would play with Dellacqua, as well as the last match of Dellacqua's career before she officially retired in April. In the following round, Barty won both of her singles matches against the Netherlands to help Australia win the tie 4–1 and advance back into the top-tier World Group in 2019 for the first time in four years.

In the World Group, Barty was instrumental in leading Australia to the 2019 Fed Cup final. She won all six of her rubbers in the first two rounds to help Australia advance against the United States and Belarus, with both ties won by a tight score of 3–2. She partnered with Priscilla Hon in her doubles rubber against the United States, and Samantha Stosur in the doubles against Belarus. Australia faced France in the final, which was played at home at Perth Arena. Barty continued her Fed Cup success in her first singles rubber with a double bagel victory over Caroline Garcia. However, her 15-rubber win streak in Fed Cup came to an end in her next match with a three-set loss to Kristina Mladenovic. Ajla Tomljanović won her second singles rubber to set up a decisive doubles rubber between Barty and Stosur for Australia and Garcia and Mladenovic for France. Garcia and Mladenovic won the match in straight sets to clinch the Fed Cup for France. The final day had 13,842 spectators in attendance.

=== Hopman Cup ===
"I can't believe it myself, I don't remember anything about it. This tops [the junior title at] Wimbledon, this trumps everything. I'm just so happy with the way I played."

— Barty speaking on her Hopman Cup win over Schiavone at age 16.

Barty represented Australia in the Hopman Cup twice. She made her first appearance at the event in 2013 where she competed alongside Bernard Tomic after Dellacqua withdrew before the tournament due to a foot injury. The Australians finished their round-robin group in second place behind Serbia. They defeated Germany and Italy in their first and last ties, but lost to Serbia in a close tie that was decided by a match tiebreak in the mixed doubles. During the tie against Italy, Barty won a lopsided singles match against former French Open champion and world No. 35 Francesca Schiavone in just 55 minutes, the biggest singles win of her career at the time.

Barty did not return to the tournament until 2019 where she teamed up with Matthew Ebden. Australia finished runner-up in their round-robin group again. The pair won their first two ties against France and Spain, but lost both of their singles matches in the decisive tie against the German team of Angelique Kerber and Alexander Zverev who won all of their ties and the group.

=== Olympic Games ===
Barty represented Australia at the 2020 Summer Olympics in three events. In singles, Barty was seeded No. 1 and lost to Sara Sorribes Tormo in round one. In doubles, Barty partnered Storm Sanders where they reached the quarterfinal. In mixed doubles, Barty partnered John Peers and they won bronze, Australia's first ever medal in an Olympic mixed doubles competition.

== Playing style ==
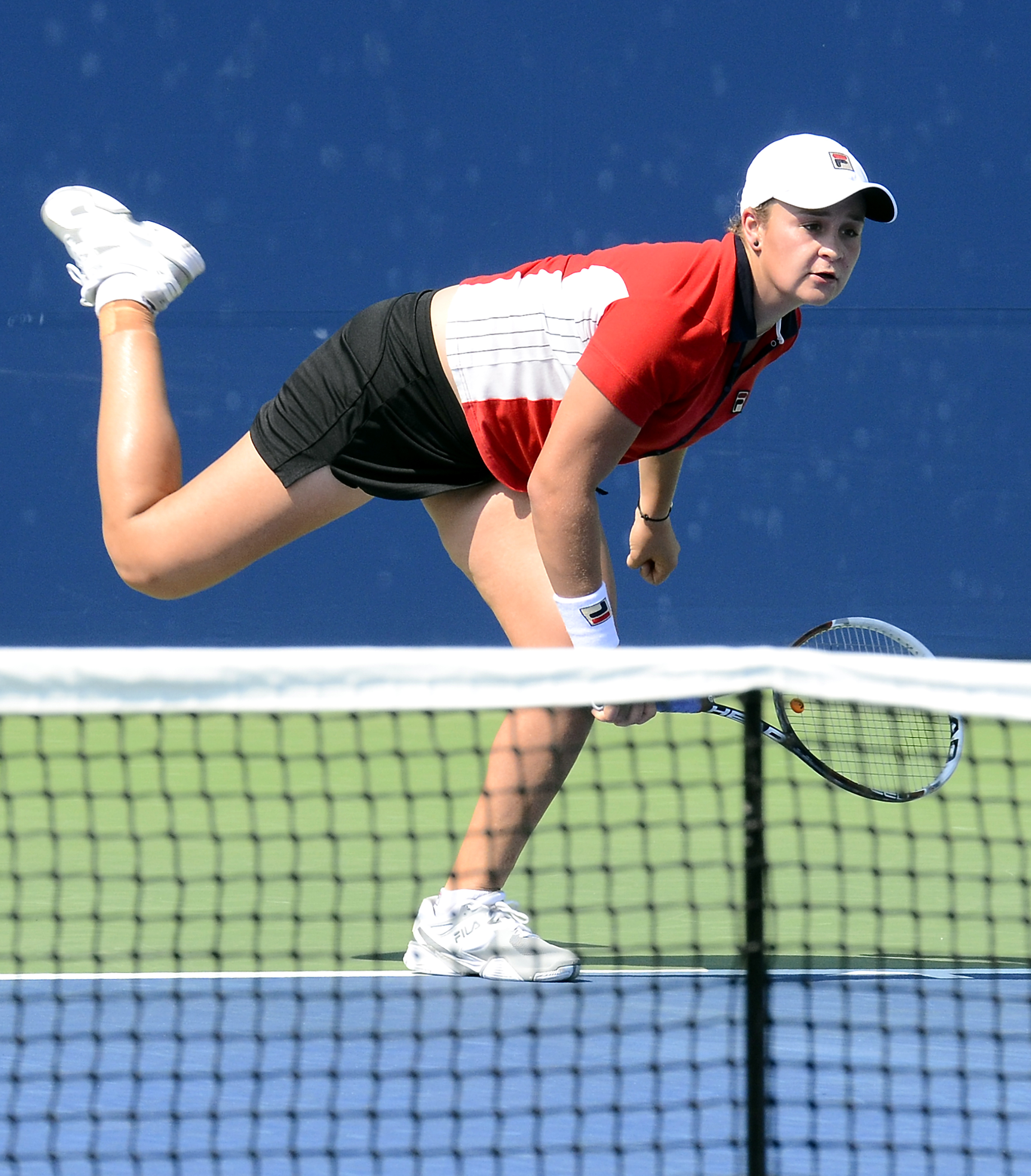
Barty serving

Barty had an all-court game and a crafty style of play. Her favourite surface was grass, despite initially not liking that surface because she had limited experience playing on it while growing up. Barty also performed well on hard courts, where she won her first WTA singles title and reached her first Premier 5 level final. She won both singles and doubles titles on all three major surfaces.

Barty's short stature and diverse array of shots led her to be compared to former world No. 1 and five-time Grand Slam singles champion Martina Hingis by David Taylor, one of Hingis' former coaches. She had solid groundstrokes from the forehand and backhand sides. In particular, she used her powerful forehand to create sharp angles on cross-court shots. Her kick serve and backhand slice are also two of her better shots. Barty's two-handed backhand was comparatively weaker than her forehand; as such, she utilised her exceptional one-handed backhand slice to create opportunities to attack with her aggressive, powerful topspin forehand. Barty's doubles game translated well to singles, as she frequently came to the net, and excelled at volleying. She used her variety of shots to trouble her opponents. Despite her height, Barty was an excellent server, with her serve being recorded as high as 115 mph (185 km/h). She finished the 2018 season at fourth on the WTA Tour in aces with a total of 297, nearly five per match. She was also second in percentage of service points won that year among players with at least ten matches, behind only Serena Williams.

Thanasi Kokkinakis, one of her compatriot contemporaries as well as one of her mixed doubles partners, has described her game as, "Ash plays different to most girls. She likes to come into the net, she uses her slice very well and she's crafty. Whereas a lot of girls like to hit the ball hard and flat, she plays a little bit differently, she plays with a bit more control... and she makes things awkward for her opponent."

== Personal life ==
Barty took a break from professional tennis from September 2014 until February 2016, and played semi-professional cricket during the second half of that hiatus. Although she gave no reasons at the time, she later said, "I needed some time to refresh mentally more than anything. It became a bit of a slog for me and I wasn't enjoying my tennis as much as I would have liked to." Her family and coaches all supported her decision. Barty had no intention of retiring and continued to play casually during her hiatus, saying, "It was never in mind that I'd retired as such... I'd been coaching and holding a racket pretty much every day so I wasn't completely out of practice." During her time off, she also pursued her hobbies such as fishing, and built a new house close to her family. She ultimately decided to return to the sport, commenting, "After a break and trying other things, I missed tennis and decided that I wanted to come back."

Barty is the National Indigenous Tennis Ambassador for Tennis Australia. The goal of this position is to promote more Indigenous participation in the sport of tennis. Barty has embraced her heritage and her role as an ambassador, saying, "I'm a very proud Indigenous woman and I think that for me taking on this role is something very close to my heart. I'm very excited." She was recognised as the Female Sportsperson of the Year at the National Dreamtime Awards, a ceremony that honours Indigenous Australians, in both 2017 and 2018, the first two editions of the awards. Barty was honoured as the Young Australian of the Year in 2020.

Barty is a supporter of the Richmond Football Club in the Australian Football League and Manchester United in the English Premier League. She presented the premiership cup to Richmond when they won the 2020 AFL Grand Final.

Barty has been in a relationship with Australian professional golfer Garry Kissick since 2017, and announced their engagement in November 2021. In September 2020, Barty won the championship at the Brookwater Golf and Country Club, where she had originally met Kissick in 2016. Barty married Kissick on 23 July 2022.

On 2 July 2023, she gave birth to a son, and in June 2025 to a daughter.

== Career statistics ==
=== Grand Slam performance timelines ===
Key
W	F	SF	QF	#R	RR	Q#	DNQ	A	NH

(W) winner; (F) finalist; (SF) semifinalist; (QF) quarterfinalist; (#R) rounds 4, 3, 2, 1; (RR) round-robin stage; (Q#) qualification round; (DNQ) did not qualify; (A) absent; (NH) not held; (SR) strike rate (events won / competed); (W–L) win–loss record.

==== Singles ====
Tournament	2011	2012	2013	2014	2015	2016	2017	2018	2019	2020	2021	2022	SR	W–L	Win %
Australian Open	A	1R	1R	1R	A	A	3R	3R	QF	SF	QF	W	1 / 9	24–8	75%
French Open	A	1R	2R	1R	A	A	1R	2R	W	A	2R	A	1 / 7	10–6	63%
Wimbledon	A	1R	Q1	Q3	A	Q2	1R	3R	4R	NH	W	A	1 / 5	12–4	75%
US Open	Q1	A	2R	1R	A	A	3R	4R	4R	A	3R	A	0 / 6	11–6	65%
Win–Loss	0–0	0–3	2–3	0–3	0–0	0–0	4–4	8–4	17–3	5–1	14–3	7–0	3 / 27	57–24	70%

==== Doubles ====
Tournament	2012	2013	2014	2015	2016	2017	2018	2019	2020	2021	2022	SR	W–L	Win %
Australian Open	1R	F	2R	A	A	QF	2R	2R	2R	2R	A	0 / 8	13–6	68%
French Open	A	1R	QF	A	A	F	1R	3R	A	A	A	0 / 5	10–5	67%
Wimbledon	A	F	QF	A	1R	QF	A	3R	NH	A	A	0 / 5	13–4	76%
US Open	A	F	1R	A	A	2R	W	F	A	A	A	1 / 5	17–4	81%
Win–Loss	0–1	15–4	7–4	0–0	0–1	12–4	7–2	10–2	1–1	1–0	0–0	1 / 23	53–19	74%

=== Grand Slam tournament finals ===
==== Singles: 3 (3 titles) ====
Result	Year	Championship	Surface	Opponent	Score
Win	2019	French Open	Clay	(Czech Republic) Markéta Vondroušová	6–1, 6–3
Win	2021	Wimbledon	Grass	(Czech Republic) Karolína Plíšková	6–3, 6–7^{(4–7)}, 6–3
Win	2022	Australian Open	Hard	(United States) Danielle Collins	6–3, 7–6^{(7–2)}

==== Doubles: 6 (1 title, 5 runner-ups) ====
Result	Year	Championship	Surface	Partner	Opponents	Score
Loss	2013	Australian Open	Hard	(Australia) Casey Dellacqua	(Italy) Sara Errani (Italy) Roberta Vinci	2–6, 6–3, 2–6
Loss	2013	Wimbledon	Grass	(Australia) Casey Dellacqua	(Chinese Taipei) Hsieh Su-wei (China) Peng Shuai	6–7^{(1–7)}, 1–6
Loss	2013	US Open	Hard	(Australia) Casey Dellacqua	(Czech Republic) Andrea Hlaváčková (Czech Republic) Lucie Hradecká	7–6^{(7–4)}, 1–6, 4–6
Loss	2017	French Open	Clay	(Australia) Casey Dellacqua	(United States) Bethanie Mattek-Sands (Czech Republic) Lucie Šafářová	2–6, 1–6
Win	2018	US Open	Hard	(United States) CoCo Vandeweghe	(Hungary) Tímea Babos (France) Kristina Mladenovic	3–6, 7–6^{(7–2)}, 7–6^{(8–6)}
Loss	2019	US Open	Hard	(Belarus) Victoria Azarenka	(Belgium) Elise Mertens (Belarus) Aryna Sabalenka	5–7, 5–7

=== Year-end championships finals ===
==== Singles: 1 (title) ====
Result	Year	Tournament	Surface	Opponent	Score
Win	2019	WTA Finals, Shenzhen, China	Hard (i)	(Ukraine) Elina Svitolina	6–4, 6–3

=== Olympic medal matches ===
==== Mixed doubles: 1 (bronze medal) ====
Result	Year	Tournament	Surface	Partner	Opponents	Score
Bronze	2021	Summer Olympics, Tokyo	Hard	(Australia) John Peers	(Serbia) Nina Stojanović (Serbia) Novak Djokovic	walkover

== Awards ==
ITF awards

- Fed Cup Heart Award: 2019
- World Champion: 2019, 2021

WTA awards

- Player of the Year: 2019, 2021

Sport Australia Hall of Fame

- The Don Award: 2019, 2022

Australian Tennis Awards

- Newcombe Medal: 2017, 2018, 2019, 2021
- Female Junior Athlete of the Year: 2010, 2011, 2012, 2013

AIS Sport Performance Awards

- ABC Sport Personality of the Year: 2019
- Female Athlete of the Year: 2019
- Sporting Moment of the Year: 2019

Australian Women's Health Sport Awards

- Sportswoman of the Year: 2019
- Moment of The Year: 2019

National Dreamtime Awards

- Female Sportsperson: 2017, 2018, 2019

Sportsmanship

- US Open: 2018, 2021

Young Australian of the Year Awards

- Young Australian of the Year: 2020

Order of Australia

- Appointed Officer of the Order of Australia in the 2022 Queen's Birthday Honours for "distinguished service to tennis at the elite level, and to youth development programs".

== Notes ==
Sporting positions
Preceded by (Japan) Naomi Osaka (Japan) Naomi Osaka	World No. 1; 24 June 2019 – 12 August 2019; 9 September 2019 – 3 April 2022	Succeeded by (Japan) Naomi Osaka (Poland) Iga Świątek
Awards and achievements
Preceded by (Romania) Simona Halep (United States) Sofia Kenin	WTA Player of The Year; 2019; 2021	Succeeded by (United States) Sofia Kenin (Poland) Iga Świątek
Preceded by (Romania) Simona Halep	ITF World Champion; 2019; 2021	Succeeded by (Poland) Iga Świątek
