= Augustine Heights, Queensland =

Augustine Heights
- Suburb
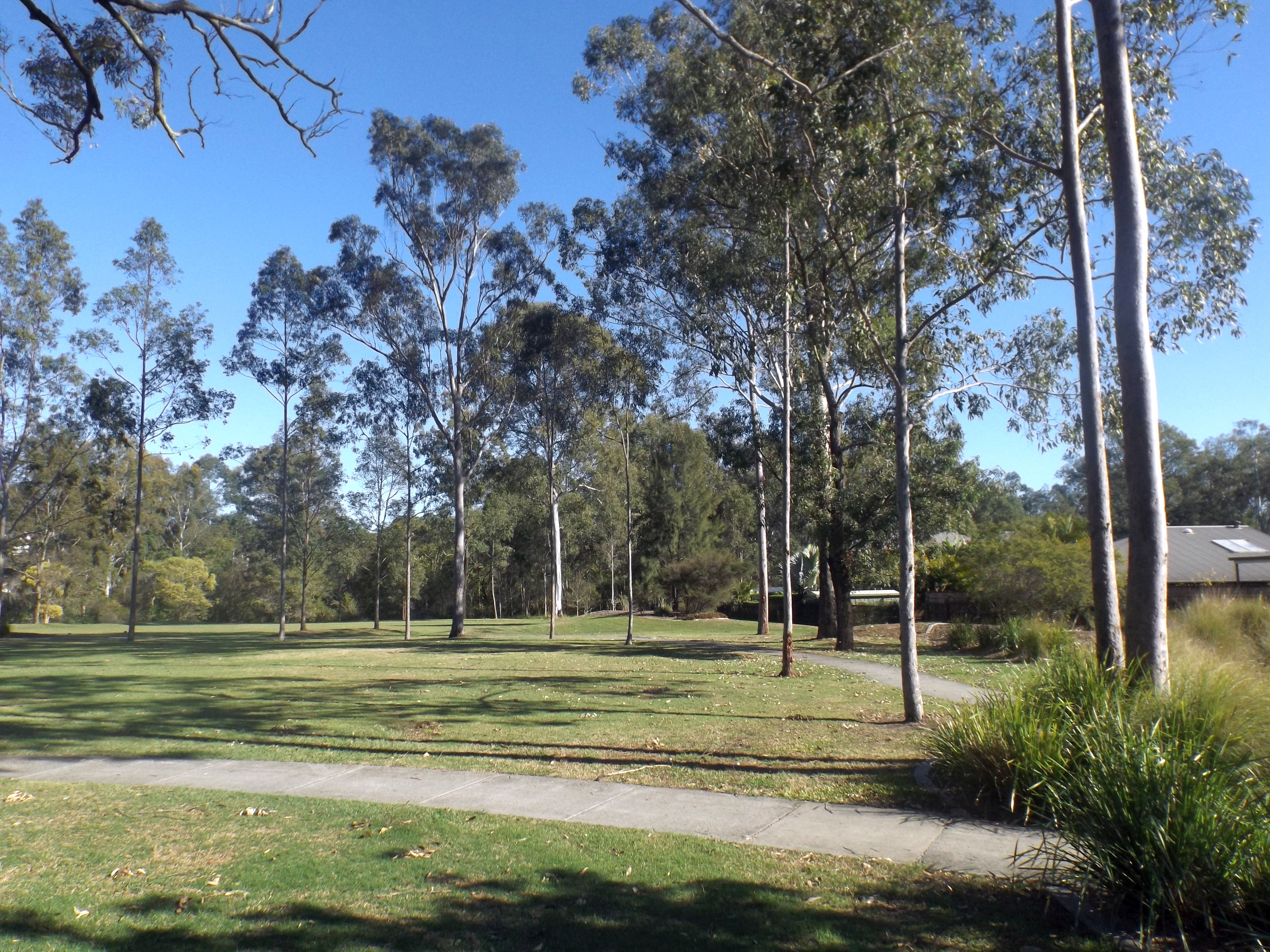
- Park along Christopher Street, 2016

- Interactive map of Augustine Heights
- Coordinates: 27.6605°S 152.8830°E
- Country: Australia
- State: Queensland
- City: Ipswich
- LGA: City of Ipswich
- Location: 17.1 km (10.6 mi) ESE of Ipswich CBD; 33.6 km (20.9 mi) SW of Brisbane CBD
- Established: 19 September 2003

Government
  - State electorate: Jordan
  - Federal division: Blair

Area
  - Total: 5.1 km^{2} (2.0 sq mi)

Population
  - Total: 6,088 (2021 census)
  - Density: 1,194/km^{2} (3,092/sq mi)
- Time zone: UTC+10:00 (AEST)
- Postcode: 4300
Suburbs around Augustine Heights
Bellbird Park	Bellbird Park	Brookwater
Redbank Plains	Augustine Heights	Brookwater
Redbank Plains	Springfield Lakes	Springfield Lakes

Augustine Heights is a suburb in the City of Ipswich, Queensland, Australia. In the 2021 census, Augustine Heights had a population of 6,088 people.

== History ==
Augustine Heights is one of the suburbs created within Greater Springfield, Australia's largest master-planned community. It was officially named and bounded on 19 September 2003.

St Augustine's College opened on 29 January 2003. On 28 July 2003, St Stephen's Catholic Church at Laravale was relocated to the college where it now serves as St Monica's Chapel (27.6613°S 152.8874°E) for use both by the school and as a church for the wider community. It was originally opened in Laravale on Sunday 18 February 1923 by Archbishop James Duhig in the presence of 400 people. St Augustine's College was officially opened and blessed by Archbishop John Battersby on 31 August 2003.

Augusta State School opened on 1 January 2011. It was originally to be called Augustine Heights State School.

Woogaroo Creek State School opened in January 2023.

== Demographics ==
In the 2016 census, Augustine Heights had a population of 4,880 people.

In the 2021 census, Augustine Heights had a population of 6,088 people.

== Education ==
Augusta State School is a government co-educational primary (Early Childhood to Year 6) school at 60-100 Brittains Road (27.6558°S 152.8765°E). In 2018, the school had an enrolment of 1,017 students with 73 teachers (65 full-time equivalent) and 47 non-teaching staff (29 full-time equivalent). It includes a special education program.

Woogaroo Creek State School is a government co-educational primary school (Prep to Year 6) at 12 Purser Road (27.6558°S 152.8765°E). In 2024, the school had an enrolment of 95 children with 10 teachers (9 full-time equivalent) and 13 non-teaching staff (9 full-time equivalent).

St Augustine's College is a Catholic co-educational primary and secondary (Prep to Year 12) school at St Augustine's Drive (27.6591°S 152.8870°E). In 2018, the school had an enrolment of 1,418 students with 99 teachers (92 full-time equivalent) and 70 non-teaching staff (51 full-time equivalent).

There are no government secondary schools in Augustine Heights. The nearest government secondary school is Redbank Plains State High School in neighbouring Redbank Plains to the west.
