= Brookwater Golf and Spa Resort =

General information
- Location: Brookwater, Queensland, Australia
- Opening: 2020
- Inaugurated: 2014
- Owner: World Group UK, Maxsen Capital Hong Kong

Other information
- Number of rooms: 520 apartments
- Number of restaurants: 4
- Facilities: Resort Clubhouse; Stage A -168 Luxury Resort Apartments; Signature Restaurants; SPA; Grand Ballroom; Brookwater Golf Course and Club House

Website
- www.brookwaterresort.com

Brookwater Golf and Spa Resort is a 5-star international resort (under development) located at Brookwater, a suburb located 30 kilometres from the Brisbane CBD, Queensland, Australia. It is a joint venture between World Group UK and Maxsen Capital Hong Kong. $750 million Brookwater resort project has been billed as the largest single foreign investment developments in Australia’s history. Upon completion it will also be the first fully integrated golf, day spa, retail, leisure, dining and recreation resort in Australia.

== History ==
Planning for the Brookwater Golf and Spa Resort project began in 2012, when Springfield Land Corporation's Chairman Maha Sinnathamby agreed to provide land for the resort development. On October 9, 2014, along with the partners Maxsen World signed a deal with Springfield Land Corporation to build the Brookwater Golf and Spa Resort in Queensland. Initially, the investment in the project was $550 million, later extended to $750 million, which is the largest single foreign investment resort in Australia's history. Maxsen World is a joint venture between World Group in the UK, which has Middle Eastern investors, and Maxsen Capital Group, a Hong Kong-based property management company. Brookwater Resort Investments Pty Limited is the Australian company involved in resort development.

== Development ==
The resort is established on 14 hectares of lands at the centre of Brookwater, Queensland provided by Springfield Land Corporation. Designed by Grounds Kent Architects, the resort development approval was granted by Ipswich City Council in February 2015. Federal Treasurer Joe Hockey gave the Foreign Investment Review Board approval to allow joint venture Maxsen World to invest in the resort. The construction of the resort started in 2016. The project was set to be completed in five stages. The first stage of Brookwater resort construction started at a cost of $110 million which proposed to develop 168 resort apartments with private plunge pools. It also includes the central resort facilities including lobby, lounges, business centre and meeting rooms, ballroom, day spa, gymnasium, restaurants and resort retail, indoor and outdoor recreational and leisure facilities, as well as recreation clubs, a wedding chapel and man-made beach. Greg Norman-designed Brookwater Golf Course is located beside the resort area. Initial infrastructure works have completed over the site and adjoining streets, with services routed around, along and through the golf course.

The Brookwater Golf and Spa Resort hit the market in late April 2015 with Stage 1 achieving $84 million in sales. Local and international buyers have acquired 134 of 168 apartments.

== Facilities ==
On completion of all phases, The Brookwater Golf and Spa Resort at First Residence will have 520 residential resort apartments comprising large two bedroom formats with private courtyards, and plunge pools adjoining outdoor areas overlooking Brookwater Golf Course. There will be a tennis stadium and club to host international tour events, a water park, a 12,000m² retail emporium, an aquatic centre designed to Commonwealth Games standards, and a Convention Centre set to host business conferences, exhibitions as well as major events. The convention center will be able to accommodate 2000 people at a time, making it the third largest conference facility in Queensland, after the Gold Coast and Brisbane convention centres. It also include a 15,000m² central resort pavilion, lap pools, a gymnasium, a lobby lounge, 24-hour concierge services, a bridal centre and a wedding chapel along with a Spa, Al fresco restaurants and food markets, street side cafes and boutique retail facilities. The resort features six private clubs including the Executive Club, Family Aquatic Club, Central Recreation Club, International Tennis Club, Family Club and South Rec Club.

The resort development area is located 30 kilometres from Brisbane's central business district and 90 kilometres from the Gold Coast. Two international airports are within reach of the area. 300,000 visitors may be generated annually through hosting international tennis and golf tournaments, marathons, business conferences, fashion festivals etc.

== See also ==
- The PuLi Hotel and Spa
