= National Dreamtime Awards 2017 =

Awards for Indigenous Australians

The 2017 National Dreamtime Awards was the inaugural National Dreamtime Awards event, held on 17 November 2017 at The Star, Sydney and were hosted by Luke Carroll and Shari Lee Niliwil Sebbo. The Awards program was broadcast nationally on NITV on 20 November 2017.

== 2017 Dreamtime Award recipients ==
The following individuals and organisations were awarded prizes in their various categories:

- Dreamtime Person of the Year – Clinton Pryor
- Dreamtime Lifetime Achievement – Rachel Perkins
- Dreamtime Elder – Uncle Bill Yidumduma Harney
- Male Music Artist – Gawurra
- Female Music Artist – Jessica Mauboy
- Male Actor – Rob Collins
- Female Actor – Shari Sebbens
- Media Person of the Year – Stan Grant
- Male Sportsperson – Eddie Betts
- Female Sportsperson – Ashleigh Barty
- International Sportsperson – Patty Mills
- Best New Sports Talent – Josh Addo-Carr
- Community Person – Jeffery Amatto
- Business of the Year – Something Wild
- Community Organisation – Miromaa
- Teacher of the Year – Nathan Towney
- Institute of the Year – ACU Yalbalinga Indigenous Higher Education Unit
- Student of the Year – Jessa Rogers
