= 2012 Australian Open – Main draw wildcard entries =

- Date: December - January
- Edition: 100th
- Category: Grand Slam (ITF)
- Location: Melbourne, Victoria, Australia; Atlanta, Georgia, USA
- Australian Open – Main draw wildcard entries

The 2012 Australian Open Wildcard Playoffs and Entries are a group of events and internal selections to choose the 8 men and women wildcard entries for the 2012 Australian Open. Tennis Australia will award eight wildcards for the men's and women's professional singles competitions. Former Australian Grand Slam champions, Pat Rafter and Todd Woodbridge will help to select the four discretionary wildcards in the men's draw. In an agreement with the United States Tennis Association, Tennis Australia will give one man and one woman from the United States a wildcard into the Australian Open. Tennis Australia also has a similar agreement with the French Tennis Federation. The Australian Open is promoted as "the Grand Slam of Asia/Pacific"; one male and one female player from this geographical area will be awarded a wildcard. The final wildcard will be awarded to the winner of the Australian Open wildcard playoff, a tournament between Australian players, who do not receive direct entry into the draw. Tennis Australia may also decide to give doubles wildcards to Asian participants, based on need and availability.

== Wildcard entries ==
These are the wildcard qualifiers, from both internal selections and playoffs.

=== Men's singles ===
Country	Name	Method of Qualification
AUS	Lleyton Hewitt	Australian Wildcard - Internal Selection
AUS	Marinko Matosevic	Australian Open Playoff Wildcard - Australia
AUS	James Duckworth	Australian Wildcard - Internal Selection
AUS	Benjamin Mitchell	Australian Wildcard - Internal Selection
USA	Jesse Levine	Australian Open Playoff Wildcard - USA
FRA	Kenny de Schepper	Australian Open Playoff Wildcard - France
JPN	Tatsuma Ito	Asian Wildcard - Internal Selection
AUS	Greg Jones	Australian Wildcard - Internal Selection

=== Women's singles ===
Country	Name	Method of Qualification
AUS	Ashleigh Barty	Australian Open Playoff Wildcard - Australia
AUS	Casey Dellacqua	Australian Wildcard - Internal Selection
USA	Madison Keys	Australian Open Playoff Wildcard - USA
FRA	Aravane Rezaï	Australian Open Playoff Wildcard - France
AUS	Olivia Rogowska	Australian Wildcard - Internal Selection
CHN	Zhang Shuai	Asian-Pacific Wildcard - Internal Selection
AUS	Isabella Holland	Australian Wildcard - Internal Selection
AUS	Bojana Bobusic	Australian Wildcard - Internal Selection

== US Playoffs ==
=== Men's singles ===
Quarterfinals
1	Bobby Reynolds	6	4	8
Rhyne Williams	4	6	10
Steve Johnson	6^{4}	0
4	Robby Ginepri	7^{7}	6
3	Denis Kudla	3	7^{7}	5
Jack Sock	6	6^{4}	4^{r}
Daniel Kosakowski	2	4
2	Jesse Levine	6	6

Semifinals
Rhyne Williams	5	2
4	Robby Ginepri	7	6
3	Denis Kudla	5	2
2	Jesse Levine	7	6

Finals
4	Robby Ginepri	0	2	1
2	Jesse Levine	6	6	6

== US Playoffs ==
=== Women's singles ===
1st Round
1	Coco Vandeweghe	6	6
Taylor Townsend	4	4
Gail Brodsky	6	4	6
4	Melanie Oudin	4	6	4
3	Jamie Hampton	6	4	7
Madison Keys	3	6	9
Grace Min	0	0
2	Alison Riske	6	6

Semifinals
1	Coco Vandeweghe	3	6	7
Gail Brodsky	6	3	9
Madison Keys	3	6	6
2	Alison Riske	6	4	1

Finals
Gail Brodsky	3	4
Madison Keys	6	6

== Australian Playoffs – Men ==
The Australian playoffs were run by Tennis Australia, with the top 24 men's Australian players who would not be direct qualifiers, or those already selected for an internal wildcard into the main draw, competing.

=== Finals ===
Semifinals
1	Greg Jones	7	2	4
5	James Duckworth	5	6	6
8	Michael Look	6	3	0
2	Marinko Matosevic	4	6	6

Final
5	James Duckworth	4	1	2
2	Marinko Matosevic	6	6	6

=== Top half ===
Round 1
Gavin van Peperzeel	7	3	6
Blake Mott	5	6	3
Dane Propoggia	6	6
Andrew Harris	3	4
Matthew Barton	6	6
Brendan Moore	4	1
Luke Saville	2	6	6
Christopher O'Connell	6	4	4

Round 2
1	Greg Jones	6	6
Gavin van Peperzeel	2	3
Dane Propoggia	6	7^{7}
6	James Lemke	4	6^{4}
3	Benjamin Mitchell	7^{10}	7
Matthew Barton	6^{8}	5
Luke Saville	2	2
5	James Duckworth	6	6

Quarterfinals
1	Greg Jones	7^{7}	6
Dane Propoggia	6^{2}	2
3	Benjamin Mitchell	3	5
5	James Duckworth	6	7

Semifinals
1	Greg Jones	7	2	4
5	James Duckworth	5	6	6

=== Bottom half ===
Round 1
Isaac Frost	7	6
Andrew Whittington	5	3
John-Patrick Smith	6	6
Maverick Banes	1	3
Nicholas Kyrgios	6	6
Alexander Bolt	4	4
John Peers	4	1
Samuel Groth	6	6

Round 2
8	Michael Look	2	7^{7}	6
Isaac Frost	6	6^{4}	0
John-Patrick Smith	7	7^{7}
4	Chris Guccione	5	6^{3}
7	Matt Reid	5	6	2
Nicholas Kyrgios	7	3	6
Samuel Groth	4	6^{6}
2	Marinko Matosevic	6	7^{8}

Quarterfinals
8	Michael Look	6	4	7^{7}
John-Patrick Smith	4	6	6^{4}
Nicholas Kyrgios	3	6	4
2	Marinko Matosevic	6	3	6

Semifinals
8	Michael Look	6	3	0
2	Marinko Matosevic	4	6	6

== Australian Playoffs – Women ==
The Australian playoffs were run by Tennis Australia, with the top 16 women's Australian players who would not be direct qualifiers, or those already selected for an internal wildcard into the main draw, competing.

=== Finals ===
The top player in each group moves to the final stage.

Semifinals
Ashleigh Barty	7	6
6	Arina Rodionova	5	3
5	Bojana Bobusic	4	5
2	Olivia Rogowska	6	7

Final
Ashleigh Barty	7^{8}	6
2	Olivia Rogowska	6^{6}	2

=== Blue group ===
		Dellacqua	Starr	Barty	Bengson	RR W–L	Set W–L	Game W–L	Standings
1	Casey Dellacqua		6–1, 6–0	3–6, 3–6	6–2, 6–2	2–1	4–2 (66.7%)	30–17 (63.8%)	2
8	Emelyn Starr	1–6, 0–6		3–6, 2–6	7–6^{(7–4)}, 5–7, 7–5	1–2	2–5 (28.6%)	25–42 (37.3%)	3
	Ashleigh Barty	6–3, 6–3	6–3, 6–2		6–2, 6–4	3–0	6–0 (100%)	36–17 (67.9%)	1
	Stephanie Bengson	2–6, 2–6	6–7^{(4–7)}, 7–5, 5–7	2–6, 4–6		0–3	1–6 (14.3%)	28–43 (39.4%)	4

Standings are determined by: 1. number of wins; 2) In two-players-ties, head-to-head records; 3. in three-players-ties, percentage of sets won, or of games won; 4. steering-committee decision.

=== Magenta group ===
		Rogowska	Jeflea	Woolcock	Hadzic	RR W–L	Set W–L	Game W–L	Standings
2	Olivia Rogowska		6–3, 7–5	6–0, 6–4	6–3, 6–2	3–0	6–0 (100%)	37–17 (68.5%)	1
7	Daniella Jeflea	3–6, 5–7		6–2, 5–7, 3–6	6–0, 6–1	1–2	3–4 (42.9%)	34–29 (44%)	2
	Belinda Woolcock	0–6, 4–6	2–6, 7–5, 6–3		5–7, 6–3, 0–6	1–2	3–5 (37.5%)	30–42 (41.7%)	3
	Azra Hadzic	3–6, 2–6	0–6, 1–6	7–5, 3–6, 6–0		1–2	2–5 (28.6%)	22–35 (38.6%)	4

Standings are determined by: 1. number of wins; 2) In two-players-ties, head-to-head records; 3. in three-players-ties, percentage of sets won, or of games won; 4. steering-committee decision.

=== Green group ===
		Holland	Rodionova	Hubacek	Tredoux; Bai	RR W–L	Set W–L	Game W–L	Standings
3	Isabella Holland		3–6, 6–0, 4–6	6–2, 6–4	6–3, 6-0 (w/ Tredoux)	2–1	5–2 (66.7%)	37–20 (64.9%)	2
6	Arina Rodionova	6–3, 0–6, 6–4		6–2, 6–0	6–0, 6–4 (w/ Bai)	3–0	6–1 (85.7%)	36–18 (66.7%)	1
	Alenka Hubacek	2–6, 4–6	2–6, 0–6		7–5, 4–6, 6–3 (w/ Bai)	1–2	2–5 (28.6%)	25–38 (39.7%)	3
Alt	Rachael Tredoux; Alison Bai	3–6, 0–6 (w/ Tredoux)	0–6, 4–6 (w/ Bai)	5–7, 6–4, 3–6 (w/ Bai)		0–1; 0–2	0–2; 1–4 (20%)	3–12; 18–29 (38.3%)	X 4

Standings are determined by: 1. number of wins; 2) In two-players-ties, head-to-head records; 3. in three-players-ties, percentage of sets won, or of games won; 4. steering-committee decision.

=== Yellow group ===
		Peers	Bobusic	Rajicic	Sanders	RR W–L	Set W–L	Game W–L	Standings
4	Sally Peers		2–6, 2–6	6–2, 6–2	6–1, 6–2	2–1	4–2 (66.7%)	28–19 (59.6%)	2
5	Bojana Bobusic	6–2, 6–2		4–6, 6–3, 7–6^{(7–2)}	6–3, 6–7^{(4–7)}, 3–6	2–1	5–3 (62.5%)	44–35 (55.7%)	1
	Viktorija Rajicic	2–6, 2–6	6–4, 3–6, 6–7^{(2–7)}		6–2, 6–3	1–2	3–4 (42.9%)	31–34 (47.7%)	3
	Storm Sanders	1–6, 2–6	3–6, 7–6^{(7–4)}, 6–3	2–6, 3–6		1–2	2–5 (40%)	24–39 (38.1%)	4

Standings are determined by: 1. number of wins; 2) In two-players-ties, head-to-head records; 3. in three-players-ties, percentage of sets won, or of games won; 4. steering-committee decision.
