= Maha Sinnathamby =

Australian-Malaysian businessman

Maha Sinnathamby AM
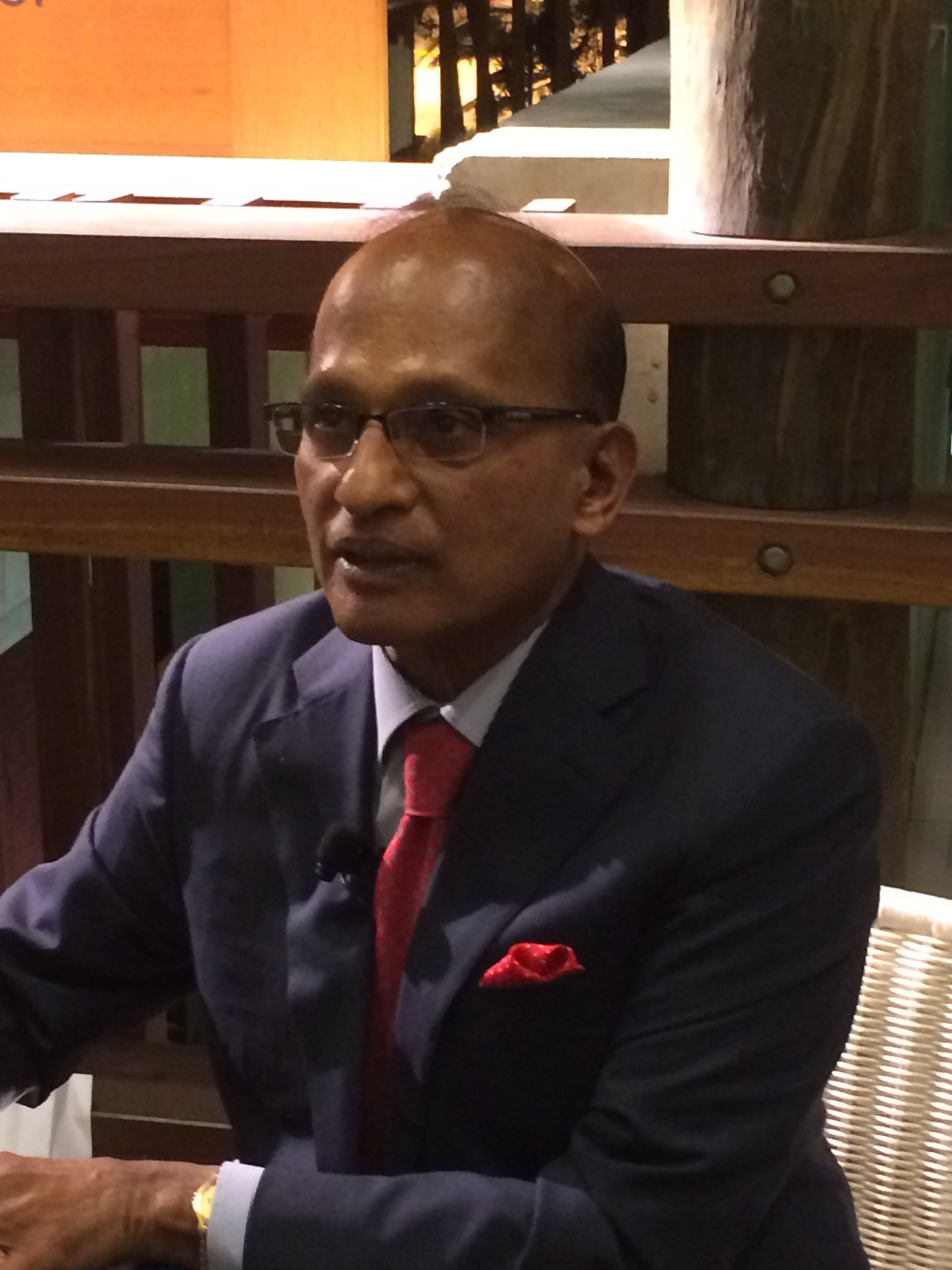
- Sinnathamby, 2015
- Born: 10 December 1939 (age 86); Rantau, Seremban, Negeri Sembilan, British Malaya (present-day Malaysia)
- Education: University of New South Wales
- Occupations: Property developer; Civil engineer
- Spouse: Yoga Sinnathamby (m. 1968)
- Children: 4

Maha Sinnathamby AM (born 10 December 1939) is an Australian businessman and property developer. He is the entrepreneur behind the Greater Springfield Development in Queensland, the largest master-planned community in Australia.

In 2019, Sinnathamby's Springfield City Group was inducted into the Queensland Business Leaders Hall of Fame in recognition of their visionary entrepreneurship in establishing Springfield, as a nation-building project and Australia's first privately-constructed city.

== Early life and education ==
Born in Malaysia on 10 December 1939, Maha Sinnathamby is a Hindu of Sri Lankan Tamil descent.

His childhood was spent on a British-owned rubber estate in the small farming village of Rantau, Negeri Sembilan. His father worked for the plantation but was taken as a prisoner of war in July 1944 during the Japanese occupation of Malaysia. In September 1945, his father was released.

Maha moved to Australia and studied civil engineering at the University of New South Wales. After graduating, he worked as a civil and design engineer for several years in South East Asia before returning to Australia.

== Business career ==
He started his own property business in Perth in 1971, before moving to Queensland in the early 1980s. He continued building the company with numerous small residential subdivisions and several commercial projects in the region.

=== Greater Springfield Development ===
In 1992 with business partner Bob Sharpless, Sinnathamby bought a 2,860 hectare (approx 7067 acre) area of land in Ipswich, south-west of Brisbane, for $7.9 million. He then lobbied for basic education and transport infrastructure to be built in the area, which required a rezoning bill to be passed. On 24 January 1997, Queensland Parliament unanimously voted in favour of the legislation.

The Greater Springfield area was designed as Australia's largest master-planned community (10th largest globally), and is focused on interconnected pillars of health, education, and information technology:

- Education City: the educational core of Greater Springfield located in Springfield Central. It contains a University of Southern Queensland campus, 10 public and private schools, student accommodation, and a technical college. It is currently home to approximately 14,000 students.
- Health City: A 52 hectare (128.5 acre) health precinct currently under construction, the area will offer Springfield residents and the wider region access to a range of professional health services. It currently contains the Mater Private Hospital. Aveo Group has been appointed exclusive developer for 2,500 new senior housing units and other health integrated facilities.
- Idea City: The IT hub of Greater Springfield features Australia's leading Polaris Data Centre, and has a strong research focus on commercialising innovation in partnership with government and business.

Currently, more than $15 billion has been invested by public and private stakeholders into the project. A$1.2 billion dual track major rail line and transit hub was established in 2013 and connected Greater Springfield to the wider South East Queensland area. Greater Springfield's current population is approximately 35,000, with a predicted growth to 105,000 by 2030. Greater Springfield's masterplan also retains 30 per cent of the land holding for open, green space.

=== Springfield City Group ===
Sinnathamby established Springfield City Group (formerly Springfield Land Corporation), of which he is the chairman, in conjunction with the purchase of the plot that would become Greater Springfield. The company is responsible for overseeing the development of the Greater Springfield area.

== Personal life ==
In 1968 he married Yoga, and they have three daughters – Raynuha, Meera, Uma – and a son, Naren. Maha enjoys playing golf at Brookwater.

=== Net worth ===
In 2017, the Financial Review added Sinnathamby to its Rich List with a net worth of A$1.02 billion; and, as of May 2025, his net worth had increased to A$2.01 billion on the 2025 Rich List.

Year	Financial Review Rich List		Forbes Australia's 50 Richest	
Year	Rank	Net worth (A$)	Rank	Net worth (US$)
2015			40 ▲	$740 million ▲
2016			41 ▼	$650 million ▼
2017	57	$1.02 billion		
2018	64 ▲	$1.21 billion ▲		
2019	72 ▼	$1.27 billion ▲	39 ▲	$980 million ▲
2020	76 ▼	$1.35 billion ▲		
2021	64 ▲	$1.78 billion ▲		
2022	68 ▲	$1.80 billion ▲		
2023	77 ▼	$1.82 billion ▲		
2024		$2.00 billion		
2025	82	$2.01 billion ▲		

Legend
Icon	Description
Steady	Has not changed from the previous year
▲	Has increased from the previous year
▼	Has decreased from the previous year

=== Philanthropy ===
Sinnathamby has donated more than A$200 million of land and funds for vital social infrastructure, and established a program of scholarships within Greater Springfield to assist people with limited access to education. Sinnathamby also mentors a select group of young professionals, helping them to achieve personal excellence.

== Awards and recognition ==
Sinnathamby's work was acknowledged globally in 2010 with the emerging Greater Springfield being named the world's best master-planned community by the International Real Estate Federation (FIABCI). He also won the Ernst and Young Master Entrepreneur of the Year.

The University of Queensland awarded Sinnathamby with an Honorary Doctorate for his continuous contribution to the community in July 2023.

=== Member (AM) of the Order of Australia ===
In 2019, Sinnathamby received an appointment as a Member (AM) of the Order of Australia (General Division) as part of the Queen's Birthday Honours List for his significant service to the community and the construction sector.

== See also ==
- Greater Springfield, Queensland
