= Bellbird Park, Queensland =

Bellbird Park
- Suburb
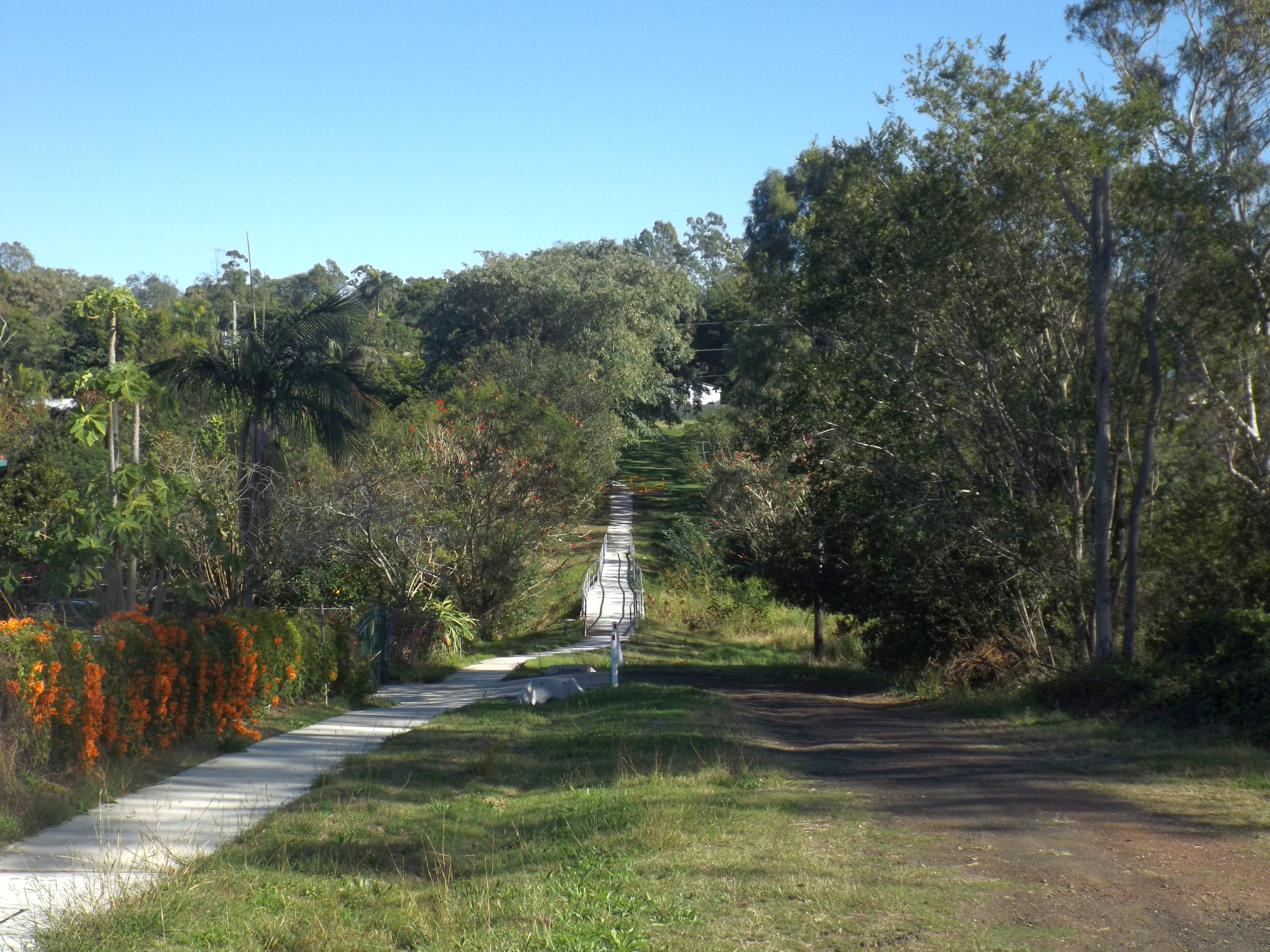
- Path along Jones Road, 2016

- Interactive map of Bellbird Park
- Coordinates: 27.6369°S 152.8880°E
- Country: Australia
- State: Queensland
- City: Ipswich
- LGA: City of Ipswich
- Location: 14.2 km (8.8 mi) ESE of Ipswich CBD; 29.0 km (18.0 mi) SW of Brisbane CBD

Government
  - State electorates: Bundamba; Jordan
  - Federal division: Oxley

Area
  - Total: 6.5 km^{2} (2.5 sq mi)

Population
  - Total: 9,191 (SAL 2021)
- Time zone: UTC+10:00 (AEST)
- Postcode: 4300
Suburbs around Bellbird Park
Redbank	Goodna	Camira
Redbank Plains	Bellbird Park	Springfield
Redbank Plains	Augustine Heights	Brookwater

Bellbird Park is a suburb in the City of Ipswich, Queensland, Australia. In the 2021 census, Bellbird Park had a population of 9,191 people.

== History ==
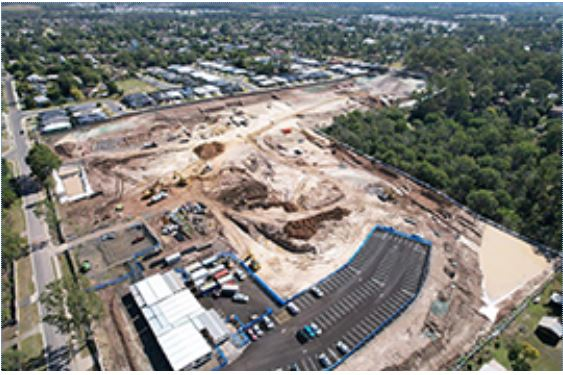
Bellbird Park State School under construction, circa 2023

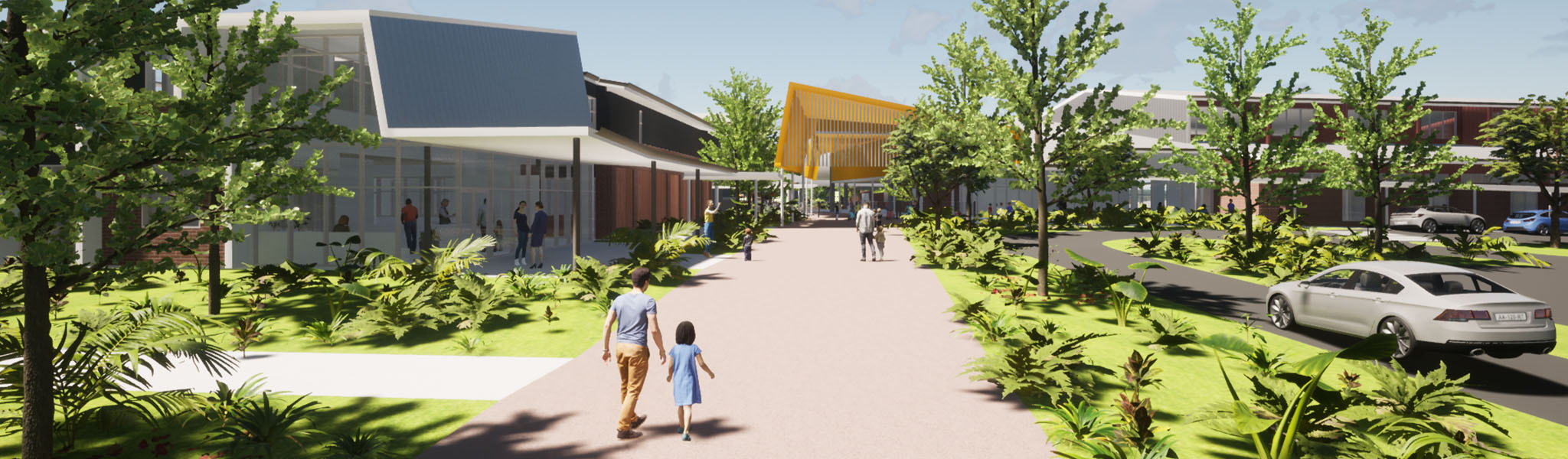
Artist's impression of Bellbird Park State School, circa 2023

Kruger State School opened 23 January 1978 at Kruger Road at Redbank Plains, but suburb boundary changes means it is now in Bellbird Park.

Bellbird Park State Secondary College opened in January 2017 for an initial intake of Year 7 students and by 2022 will be offering Year 7 through to Year 12.

Bellbird Park State School was scheduled to open on 22 January 2024 under foundation principal Roger Sheehan. However, severe thunderstorms in South-East Queensland over the 2023–2024 summer caused the site to be extensively water-logged preventing the final stages of construction involving outdoor play areas and fire egress. Students enrolled at the school for 2024 were transported each day to other local schools until the construction was completed.

== Demographics ==
In the 2011 census, Bellbird Park had a population of 5,031 people.

In the 2016 census, Bellbird Park had a population of 6,736 people.

In the 2021 census, Bellbird Park had a population of 9,191 people.

== Heritage sites ==
The Ipswich City Council's expanded heritage study identified the farmhouse Langley at 83 Johnstone Street as having significant cultural heritage. It was built for pioneers Alfred and Edith Josey in 1886.

== Education ==
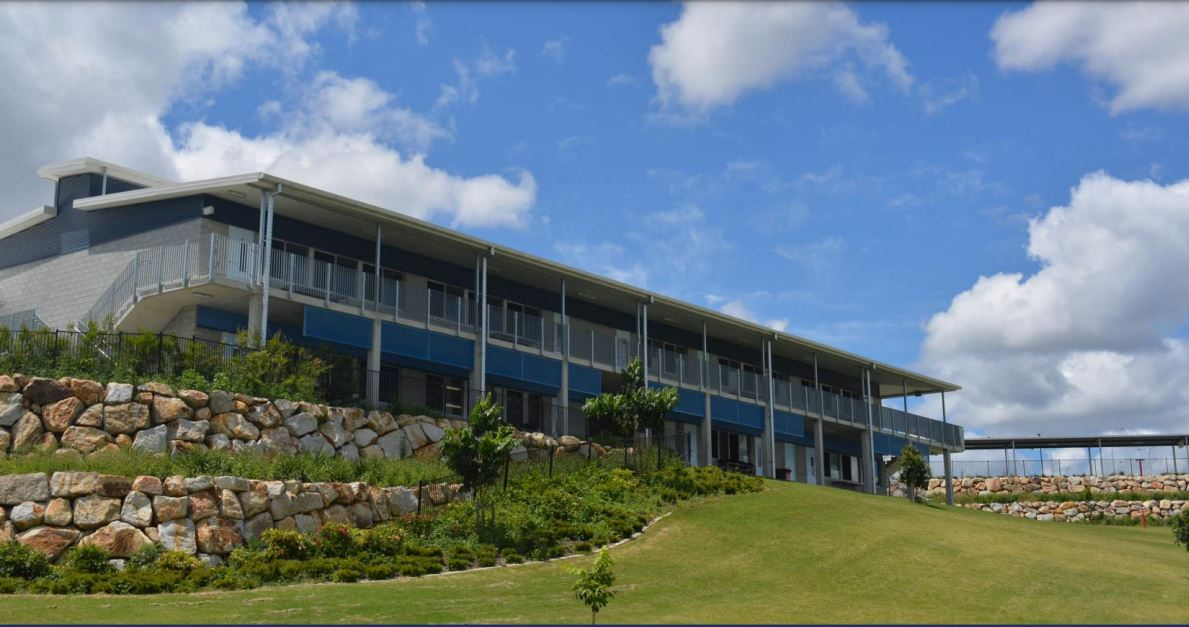
Bellbird Park State Secondary College, 2024

Kruger State School is a government primary (Prep–6) school for boys and girls at Kruger Parade (27.6289°S 152.8748°E). In 2018, the school had an enrolment of 972 students with 69 teachers (66 full-time equivalent) and 38 non-teaching staff (27 full-time equivalent). It includes a special education program.

Bellbird Park State School is a government primary (Prep–6) school for boys and girls at 30 Harris Street (27.6374°S 152.8787°E). In 2024 (its first year of operation), it had an enrolment of 224 students with 16 teachers and 15 non-teaching sfaff (13 full-time equivalent).

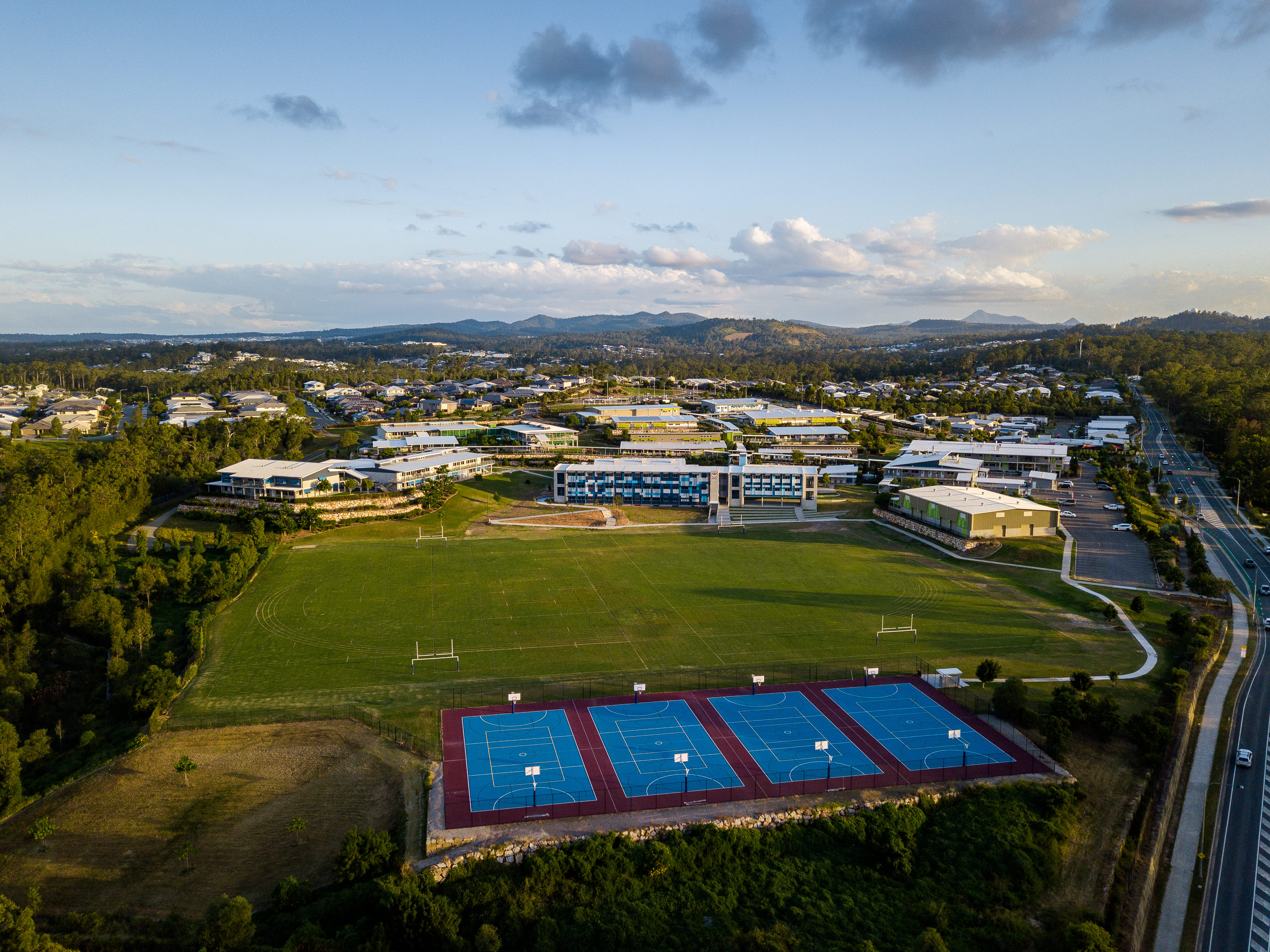
Bellbird Park State Secondary College, 2022

Bellbird Park State Secondary College is a government secondary (7–12) school for boys and girls at 2 Alesana Drive (27.6405°S 152.8837°E). In 2018, the school had an enrolment of 520 students with 46 teachers (45 full-time equivalent) and 16 non-teaching staff (12 full-time equivalent).
