= Brookwater, Queensland =

Brookwater
- Suburb
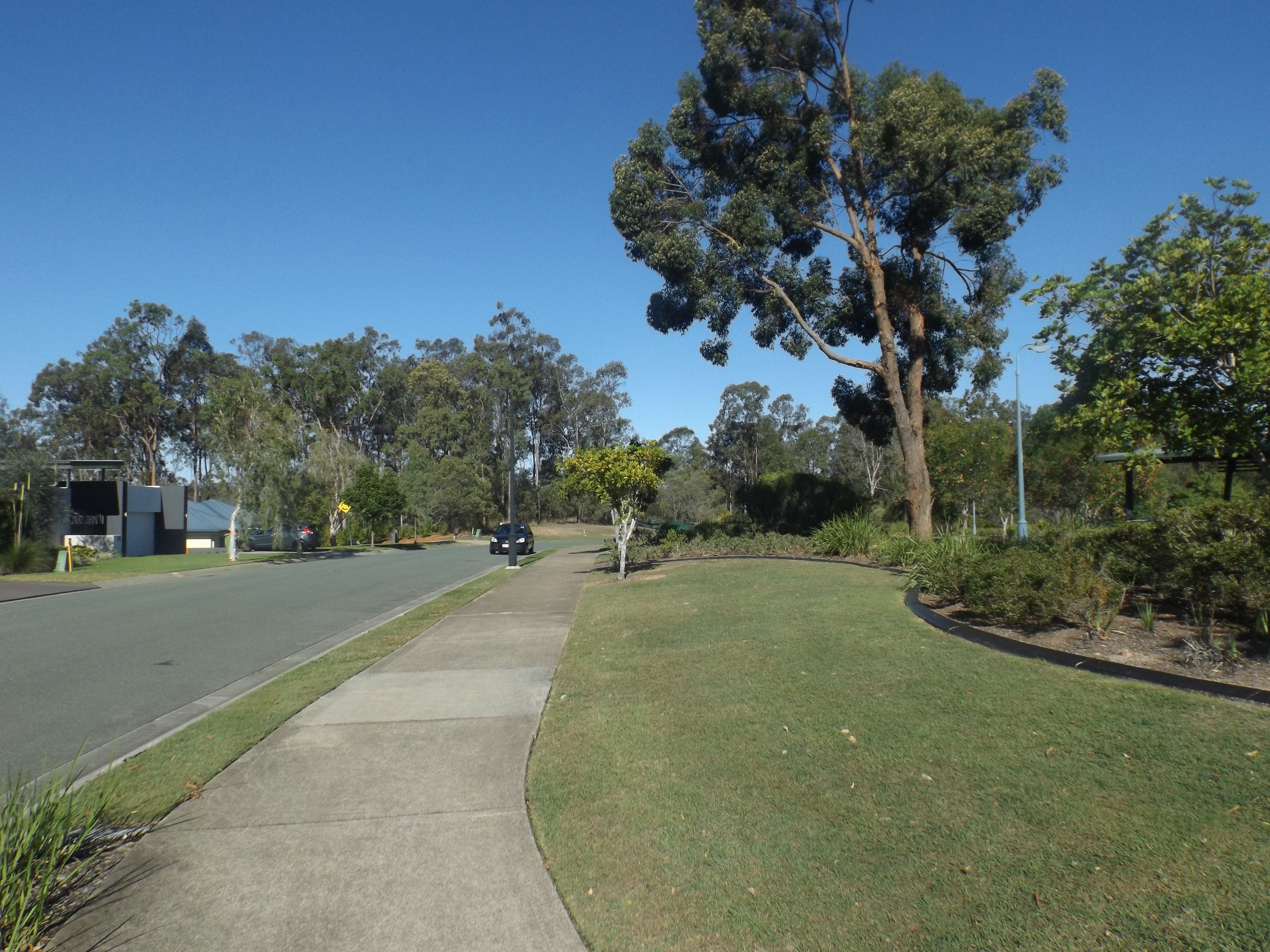
- Scoparia Drive, 2016

- Interactive map of Brookwater
- Coordinates: 27.6588°S 152.8972°E
- Country: Australia
- State: Queensland
- City: Ipswich
- LGA: City of Ipswich
- Location: 5.5 km (3.4 mi) N of Springfield Central; 23.0 km (14.3 mi) ESE of Ipswich CBD; 32.9 km (20.4 mi) SW of Brisbane CBD

Government
  - State electorate: Jordan
  - Federal division: Oxley

Area
  - Total: 3.1 km^{2} (1.2 sq mi)

Population
  - Total: 2,902 (SAL 2021)
- Time zone: UTC+10:00 (AEST)
- Postcode: 4300
Suburbs around Brookwater
Bellbird Park	Bellbird Park	Springfield
Augustine Heights	Brookwater	Springfield
Springfield Lakes	Springfield Central	Springfield

Brookwater is a suburb in the City of Ipswich, Queensland, Australia. It is one of the suburbs of the Greater Springfield Development. In the 2021 census, Brookwater had a population of 2,902 people.

== Geography ==
Brookwater is bordered by Bellbird Park to the north, Augustine Heights to the west, Springfield to the east, and Springfield Central in the south.

== History ==
Brookwater was named and bounded in 2003.

The Urban Development Institute of Australia judged Brookwater to be the best residential subdivision in 2006.

== Demographics ==
In the 2016 census, Brookwater had a population of 2,151 people.

In the 2021 census, Brookwater had a population of 2,902 people.

== Education ==
There are no schools in Brookwater. The nearest government primary schools are Augusta State School in neighbouring Augustine Heights to the west and Spring Mountain State School in Spring Mountain to the south-west. The nearest government secondary schools are Redbank Plains State High School in Redbank Plains to the west and Springfield Central State High School in neighbouring Springfield Central to the south.

There is a Goodstart Early Learning childcare centre in Brookwater.

== Facilities ==
Mater Health Centre Brookwater is a private hospital (27.6635°S 152.8918°E).

== Amenities ==
Brookwater Golf and Country Club has an 18-hole golf course at 1 Tournament Drive (27.6630°S 152.8943°E). The golf course was designed by Greg Norman. The par 72 golf course measures 6,505 metres (21,342 ft) and has been voted as Queensland's number one golf course in Golf Australia Magazine's best 50 courses. Brookwater has also hosted the Isuzu Queensland Open and the 2015 Emirates Golf Challenge.

Brookwater Village Shopping Centre has a Woolworths shopping centre, restaurants and cafés at 2 Tournament Drive (27.6636°S 152.8917°E).

There are a number of parks in the suburb, including:

- Myrtle Crescent Park (27.6601°S 152.8969°E)
- Oakmont Park (27.6672°S 152.8938°E)
- Oakview Circuit Park (27.6573°S 152.8929°E)
- Opossum Creek Parklands (27.6575°S 152.9013°E)
- Opossum Creek Wildlife Corridor (27.6468°S 152.8944°E)
- Scenic Park (27.6502°S 152.8935°E)

== Transport ==
The closest train station to Brookwater is Springfield Central railway station on the Springfield railway line. It branches from the Ipswich railway line after Darra railway station. The Centenary Highway, Logan Motorway and Ipswich Motorway are all nearby.
