= National Dreamtime Awards 2018 =

Awards for Indigenous Australians

The 2018 National Dreamtime Awards were the 2018 event of the National Dreamtime Awards, held on 16 November 2018 at The Star, Sydney and hosted by Luke Carroll. The Awards program was broadcast nationally on NITV.

== 2018 Dreamtime Award recipients ==
The following individuals and organisations were awarded prizes in their various categories:

- Dreamtime Person of the Year – Bruce Pascoe
- Dreamtime Lifetime Achievement – Archie Roach
- Dreamtime Elder – Aunty Thelma Weston
- Male Music Artist – Baker Boy
- Female Music Artist – Mojo Juju
- Male Actor – Baykali Ganambarr
- Female Actor – Leah Purcell
- Media Person of the Year – Allan Clarke
- Male Sportsperson – Latrell Mitchell
- Female Sportsperson – Ashleigh Barty
- International Sportsperson – Tai Tuivasa
- Best New Sports Talent – Harley Windsor
- Community Person – Uncle Steve Hall
- Business of the Year – Red Centre Enterprises
- Community Organisation – Redfern Aboriginal Medical Service
- Educator of the Year – Nicole Watson
- Educational Institute of the Year – NAISDA Dance College
- Student of the Year – Ashley Walker
