= The PuLi Hotel and Spa =

Hotel in Shanghai, China

Coordinates: 31.222°N 121.448°E

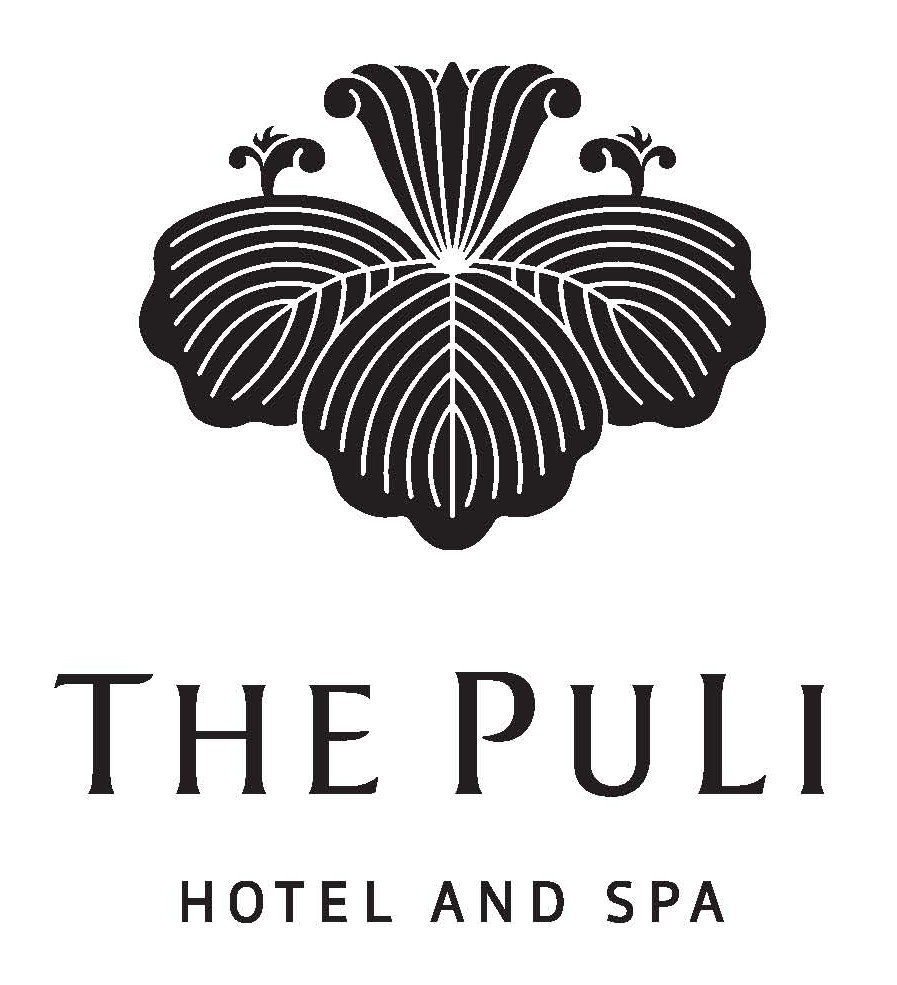
- The PuLi Hotel and Spa's logo

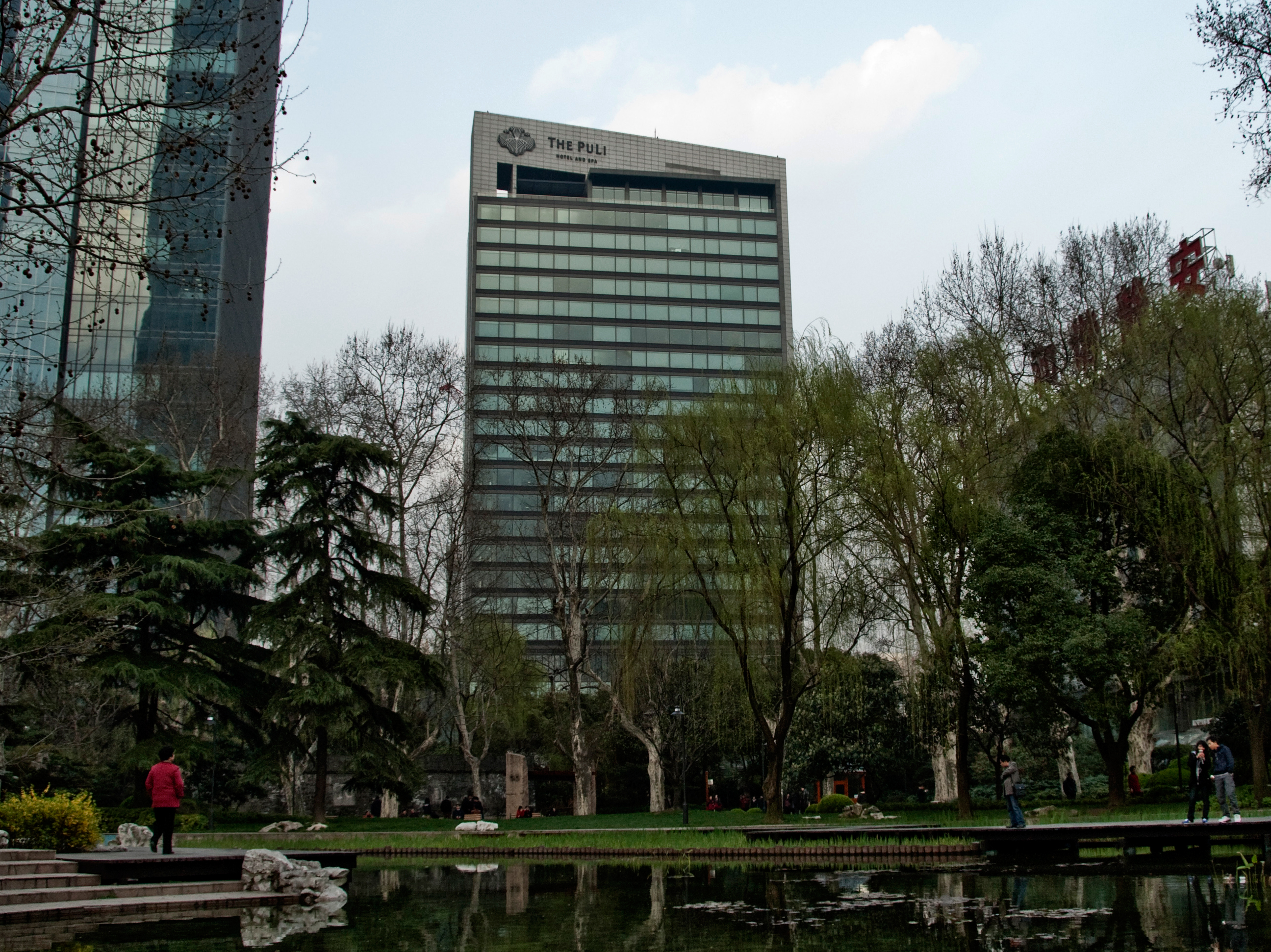
- The exterior view of The PuLi Hotel and Spa
- Interactive map of the The PuLi Hotel and Spa area
- Hotel chain: Urban Resort Concepts

General information
- Location: 1 Changde Road, Jing'an District, Shanghai 200040 China
- Opening: 4 September 2009
- Owner: Shanghai Cross Ocean Property Development
- Management: Urban Resort Concepts

Technical details
- Floor count: 26

Design and construction
- Architect: Kume Sekkei Japan

Other information
- Number of rooms: 193
- Number of suites: 36
- Number of restaurants: 2

Website
- www.thepuli.com

The PuLi Hotel and Spa (Chinese: 璞麗酒店; pinyin: Púlì Jiǔdiàn) is one of the first luxury urban resorts in Shanghai. Situated in Jing'an District of Shanghai, China, the hotel is centrally located between Nanjing West Road and Yan'an Road, adjacent to the multi-use development Park Place. With 229 rooms inclusive of 36 suites, The PuLi offers in-room dining, concierge, laundry and valet services, and PHÉNIX - a Michelin restaurant rooted in the philosophy of "Life is about the ingredients". The PuLi Hotel and Spa is the first hotel of Urban Resort Concepts and is the member hotel of The Leading Hotels of the World in China. In March 2010, the hotel was included in Design Hotels network as a member hotel. The Chinese name of The PuLi Hotel and Spa The hotel logo was inspired by a phoenix and the flame tree (鳳凰树).

The hotel facilities including gymnasium, sauna, steam rooms, swimming pool and the inaugural UR SPA, are located on the third floor.

== Building materials ==
Chinese materials, including dark local timbers, cast bronze, air dried clay tiles, grey Shanghai brick and local flamed and handmade stone were used as building materials for hotel's public areas and guestrooms.

Examples of building materials application in the hotel:

- Stingray leather panels above the Library fireplace in size of 309 cm width by 218 cm height by 83 cm depth
- Bronze wall at the end of the swimming pool

== Awards ==
2025

- Travel Guide Hotel of the Year 2025 Four Star Award
- Classic Hotel of the Year
- PHÉNIX - Black Pearl One Diamond Restaurant
- PHÉNIX - 2025 World's Best 1000 Restaurants
- PHÉNIX - One Michelin star

2024

- Classic Hotel of the Year
- Travel Guide Hotel of the Year 2024 Four Star Award
- Travelers' Choice 2024
- Best Hotel Garden Terrace
- Shanghai hotel ranked first
- Yao Spa / Rejuvenating Spring/Summer Treatment - Annual Rich Attraction Spa treatment
- Long Bar - One cup of recommendation Awards
- PHÉNIX - Black Pearl One Diamond
- PHÉNIX - One Michelin star restaurant
- PHÉNIX - Three cups prize

== Hygienic issues ==
On November 14, 2018, CCTV released a video titled "The Secret of the Cup". The video was first released by a Weibo user. The content was a secret undercover inspection of the sanitation of guest rooms in high-end hotels for foreigners, and a lot of sanitary chaos has been found. In the 14 hotels that were investigated, it was found that the room cleaners used the same dirty cloth, dirty bath towels used by customers, etc. to wipe the cup, toilet, sink, bathroom glass and other serious violations.

The PuLi Hotel was one of the 14 hotels investigated. On the afternoon of November 16, the PuLi Hotel announced through an official Weibo release that the hotel had conducted an in-depth investigation, sincerely apologized for the situation in the video, and promised to strengthen supervision. In addition, the Ministry of Culture and Tourism of the People's Republic of China has launched an investigation into the hotels that were investigated.
