= National Dreamtime Awards 2019 =

Awards for Indigenous Australians

The 2019 National Dreamtime Awards event was the 2019 iteration of the National Dreamtime Awards, held on Saturday 16 November 2019 at The Star, Sydney and hosted by Andy Saunders and Rachael Hocking. The Awards program was broadcast nationally on NITV.

== 2019 Dreamtime Award recipients ==
The following individuals and organisations were awarded prizes in their various categories:

- Dreamtime Person of the Year – Ashleigh Barty
- Dreamtime Lifetime Achievement – Nova Peris
- Dreamtime Elder – Uncle Ralph Naden
- Male Music Artist – Electric Fields
- Female Music Artist – Jessica Mauboy
- Male Actor – Rob Collins
- Female Actor – Rarriwuy Hick
- Media Person of the Year – Brooke Boney
- Male Sportsperson – Jack Wighton
- Female Sportsperson – Ashleigh Barty
- Best New Sports Talent – Brent Naden
- Community Person – Thomas Cameron
- Business of the Year – Walkabout Barber
- Community Organisation – The Purple House
- Educator of the Year – Amanda Toomey
- Educational Institute of the Year – Koorie Education, Deakin University
- Student of the Year – Matthew Watts
