= Redbank Plains State High School =

Location
- 136 Willow Road; Redbank Plains, Queensland; Australia; 27°39′07.36″S 152°52′08.72″E

Information
- Type: Public, co-educational, secondary, day school
- Motto: Learning First... Leading Tomorrow
- Established: 1987
- Principal: Aimee Argiro
- Teaching staff: 116
- Employees: 174 (2023)
- Secondary years taught: Years 7-12
- Gender: Co-education
- Enrolment: 1,455 (2023)
- Campus: Urban (Ipswich)
- Colours: Light blue & navy blue
- Website: redbankplainsshs.eq.edu.au

Redbank Plains State High School is a public co-educational secondary school located in the Ipswich suburb of Redbank Plains, Queensland, Australia. It is administered by the Queensland Department of Education, with an enrolment of 1,445 students and a teaching staff of 116, as of 2023. The school serves students from Year 7 to Year 12.

== History ==
The school opened on 27 January 1987 with a staff of 20 teachers under the leadership of Principal Bernadette O’Rourke. Twelve classes of Year 8 students (380) began the year.

In 2008, the school won The Queensland University of Technology Showcase Award for Excellence in Leadership for its work in supporting pregnant and parenting students.

On 10 July 2012, the school was the venue for a community cabinet meeting which was attended by the Prime Minister, Julia Gillard, Cabinet ministers and roughly 400 community members.

On 15 November 2021, the school was the venue for a COVID-19 vaccine rollout press conference Premier, Annastacia Palaszczuk and cabinet minister.

== Demographics ==
In 2023, the school had a student enrollment of 1,445 with 116 teachers (111 full-time equivalent) and 58 non-teaching staff (42 full-time equivalent). Female enrollments consisted of 731 students and Male enrollments consisted of 714 students; Indigenous enrollments accounted for a total of 8% of total enrollments and 44% of students had a language background other than English.

== Notable alumni ==
- Sera Koroi, rugby league footballer
- Treymain Spry, rugby league footballer

== See also ==
- Education in Australia
- Lists of schools in Greater Brisbane
