= National Dreamtime Awards =

Annual celebration of Australian Aboriginal and Torres Strait Islander achievement

- Awarded for: Australian Aboriginal and Torres Strait Islander achievement
- Country: Australia
- First award: 2017

Television/radio coverage
- Network: SBS Television

The National Dreamtime Awards, known simply as the Dreamtime Awards, are an annual celebration of Australian Aboriginal and Torres Strait Islander achievement in sport, arts, academic and community.

== History ==
The inaugural Dreamtime Awards were held in 2017 at The Star in the Sydney suburb of Pyrmont. The National Dreamtime Awards were launched to fill the void in recognising Indigenous Australians' achievements as a result of the 2013 cessation of the Deadly Awards.

== Description ==
A panel of experts judges the final winners in each category, determined by nomination and voting process through online and media partners.

== Awards ==
- National Dreamtime Awards 2017
- National Dreamtime Awards 2018
- National Dreamtime Awards 2019

=== 2020–2021 ===
Owing to the COVID-19 pandemic in Australia, the 2020 event took place on 11 December 2020, and the 2021 event was cancelled. Rugby league player Jack Wighton was recognised as 2020 Sportsman of the Year, and Kerrie Kennedy won the Awabakal Excellence in Education Award.

== See also ==
- Indigenous Australian music
- List of television awards
