= Greater Springfield, Queensland =

Greater Springfield
- Coordinates: 27.6855°S 152.9041°E
- Country: Australia
- State: Queensland
- LGA: City of Ipswich
- Location: 20 km (12 mi) ESE of Ipswich; 29 km (18 mi) SW of Brisbane

Government
  - State electorates: Bundamba; Inala
  - Federal divisions: Oxley; Blair

Population
  - Total: 47,000 (2021)
- Postcode: 4300

Greater Springfield is a private development undertaken by the Springfield City Group and one of the fastest-growing developments in Australia; it is located in Ipswich, in the south-west of the Brisbane metropolitan area in Queensland, Australia. It is the first privately built city in Australia and the country’s largest master planned community (tenth largest globally), encompassing 2,860 hectares (7067 acres).

In 2021, the population of Greater Springfield was estimated around 47,000, with a projection to grow to 105,000 residents by 2030. Community development is managed and coordinated by Springfield City Group. The plan is to have a group of suburbs with the population of Darwin by 2030.

In 2019, Springfield City Group was inducted into the Queensland Business Leaders Hall of Fame in recognition of their visionary entrepreneurship in establishing Springfield, as a nation-building project and Australia's first privately-constructed city.

== History ==
The land for Greater Springfield was acquired in 1991 by Maha Sinnathamby and Bob Sharpless. Sinnathamby and Sharpless assembled a team and developed Greater Springfield masterplan based on interconnected pillars of health, education and information technology.

The Local Government (Springfield Zoning) Act 1997 was gazetted in view of the long term nature of development being undertaken across Greater Springfield. This Act gave rise to a unique Planning Regime which provides certainty to the developer. The Structure Plan established a unique assessment process that ensures the intentions, provisions and understanding in and behind the Springfield Structure Plan are not to be overreached or changed through Local Planning Policies so to adversely affect the development entitlements conferred by the Structure Plan. All levels of Government recognise that the achievement of this goal is essential to ensure the certainty of the development rights. From Springfield City Group's (SCG’s) viewpoint such certainty is essential to the future proofing of the project.

== Suburbs of Greater Springfield ==
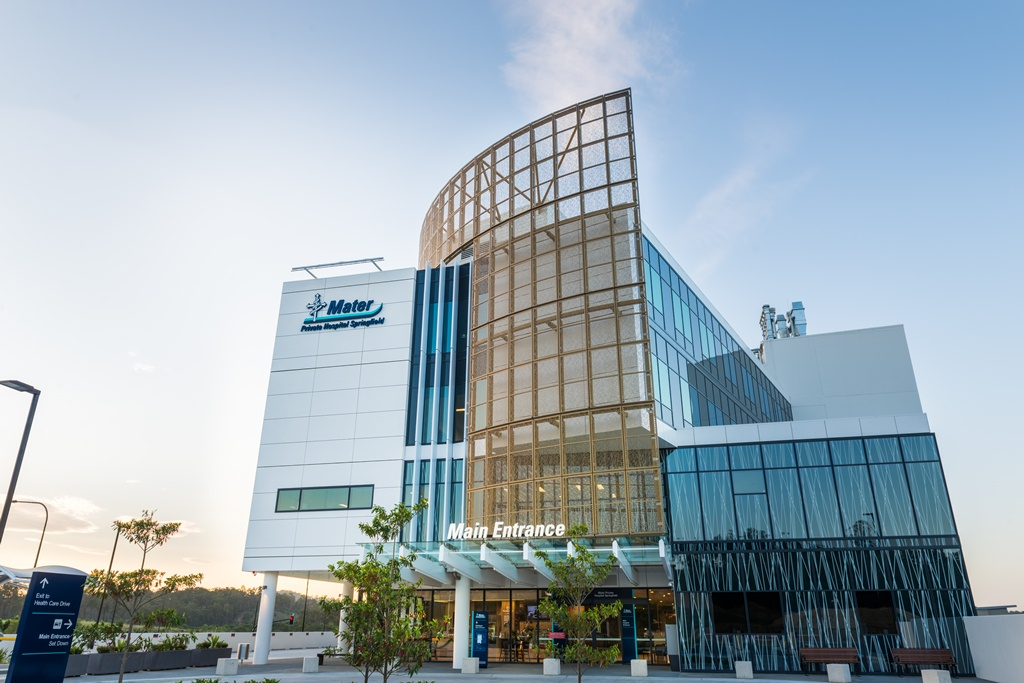
Main entrance of the Greater Springfield Mater Private Hospital.

The suburbs of the region generally known as Greater Springfield are Springfield Central, Springfield Lakes, Brookwater, Augustine Heights, Spring Mountain and Springfield itself. 30 per cent of Greater Springfield is dedicated to absolute green space.

== Facilities ==
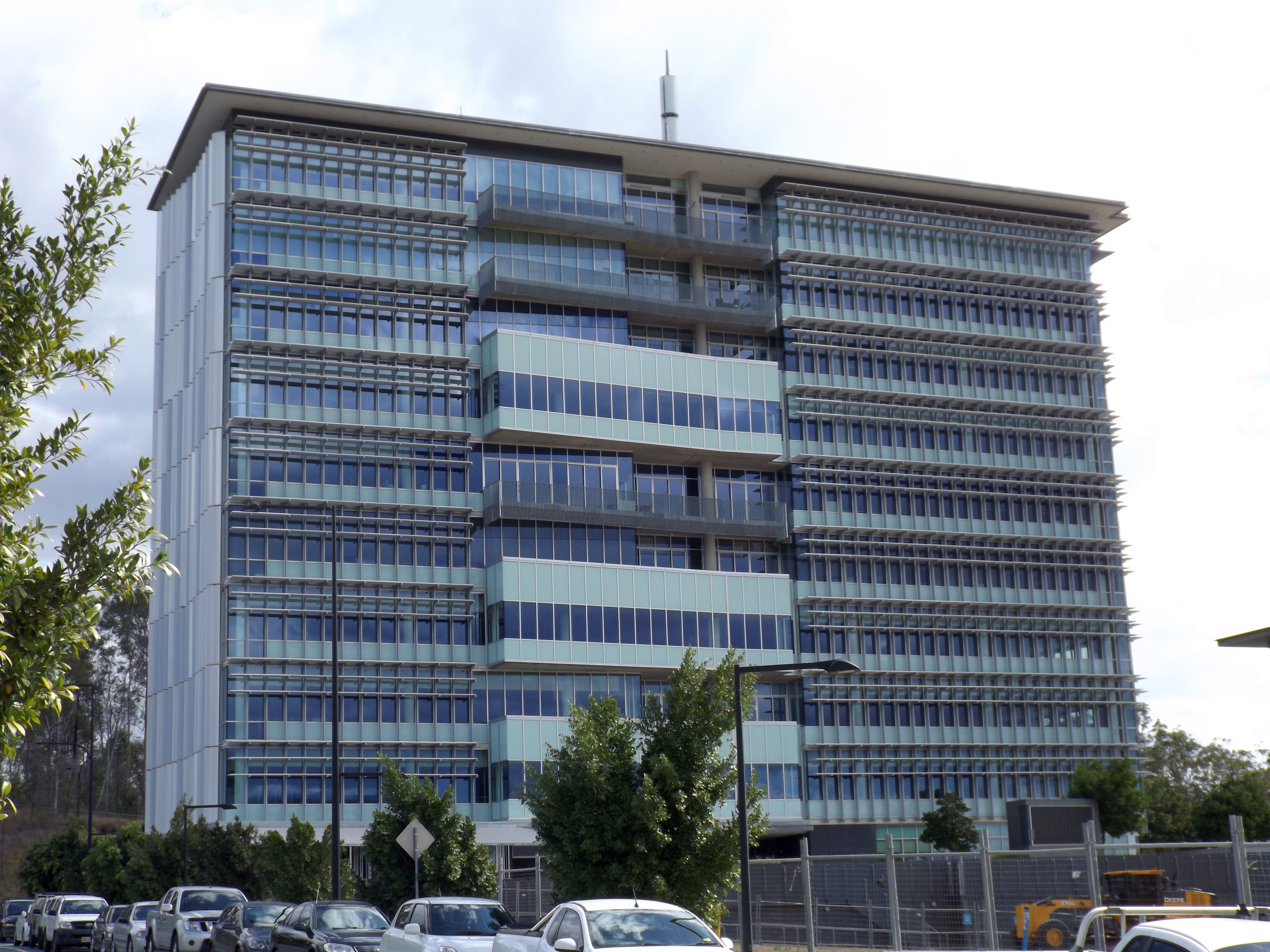
Office building at Springfield Central, home of the Springfield City Group, 2014

The first stage of Springfield's largest shopping centre, Orion Springfield Central, has been open since 15 March 2007. Major tenants now include Woolworths, Big W, Coles, Target and Event Cinemas.

Greater Springfield’s Mater Private Hospital is an 80-bed, $85 million facility which provides a number of medical and surgical services. The 10,000 square metre hospital features four operating theatres, inpatient wards, a day surgery unit and medical imaging services as well as a combination of inpatient, day and chemotherapy beds supported. As of 2017, the hospital hosted 40 private doctors and 260 total employees.

Mater health services have announced that a new Mater public hospital is under construction as an expansion on the existing private hospital. The new 174 bed public hospital will include an emergency department, intensive care unit, maternity service and additional procedural areas. Completion is expected by 2024 and is a key focus for the Queensland Government.

600,000 square metres of land has been set aside for commercial space, which is called the Parkside business precinct. The precinct already contains a 10-story tower which cost $60 million to build, as well as GE HQ and Polaris Data Centre. The Polaris data centre was built at Springfield, opened in 2009 storing data for a range of companies including Dell, Suncorp and HP. The datacentre cost $220 million to construct and was designed by Strategic Directions.

In 2016, Greater Springfield’s town centre, Orion Springfield Central, was expanded to provide over 165 commercial spaces for commercial businesses. This town centre also features Robelle Domain, a 24-hectare public space featuring boardwalks, sporting areas, playgrounds and water parks. Within Robelle Domain is Orion Lagoon, an inland water park and paddle pool features pools from 0.3m to 1.5m and a range of public amenities.

In 2018, Aveo Springfield opened its first two buildings, providing 86 living spaces for elderly residents. The seniors living community is expected to host more than 2500 living spaces once the development is completed.

Construction on the new $70 million state-of-the-art Brisbane Lions AFL Stadium began in 2021 and is set for completion in September 2022. The stadium, officially named the Brighton Homes Arena, will be the first-ever, purpose built dedicated stadium to a women’s sports team, namely the Brisbane Lions AFLW.

== Schools ==
Greater Springfield now hosts 11 different schools, offering both primary and secondary, public and private education. Spring Mountain State School is the most recent addition, and was opened in 2019.

The Springfield Anglican College has a campus on Springfield College Drive, with a second campus (Middle & Senior) on the Springfield–Greenbank Arterial road. In 2008, St. Peters Lutheran College Springfield was opened with the school celebrating its 10 year anniversary with a book launch.

The University of Southern Queensland has a campus in Springfield. Classes began in February 2006. In 2015, a new four-story, 9000 square metre building, known as Building B, was opened at a cost of $45 million. TAFE Queensland South West, previously Bremer Institute of TAFE also has a campus in Springfield.

Springfield Central State High School underwent expansion works in 2019, with the construction of a new $9.89 million Sport and Community Hall as part of the Queensland Government’s $200 million Advancing Queensland Schools Program. The school has announced that a second senior campus is under construction and is due for completion by 2024, and will see the capacity of students double to accommodate the growth. The campus will feature several new 6-story buildings and a performing arts centre.

== Transport ==
Springfield is connected to Brisbane CBD by the Centenary Motorway and the Springfield railway line, a branch of the Ipswich railway line that starts at Darra station, and extends to Springfield.

== Gallery ==
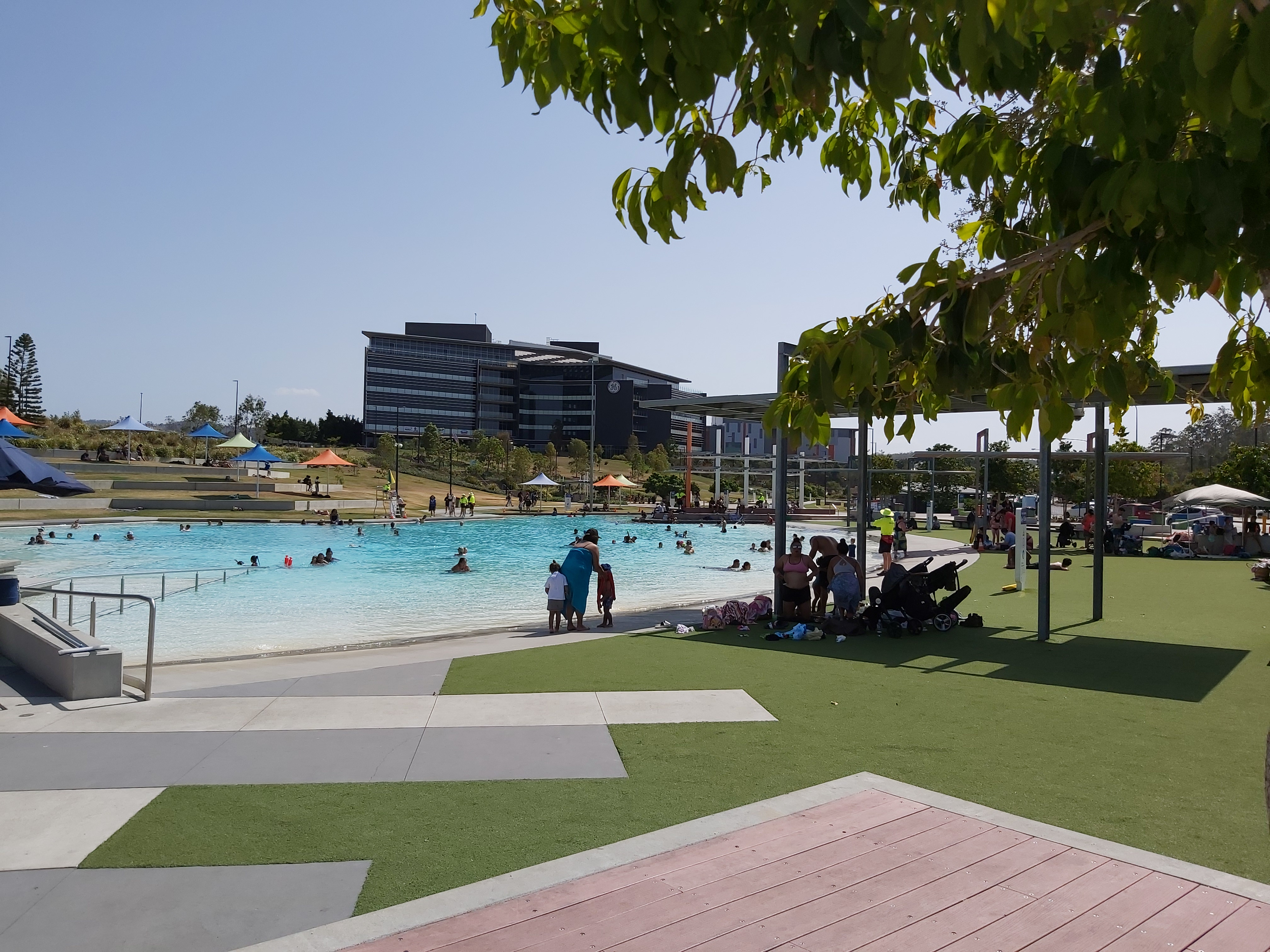
Orion lagoon, 2019

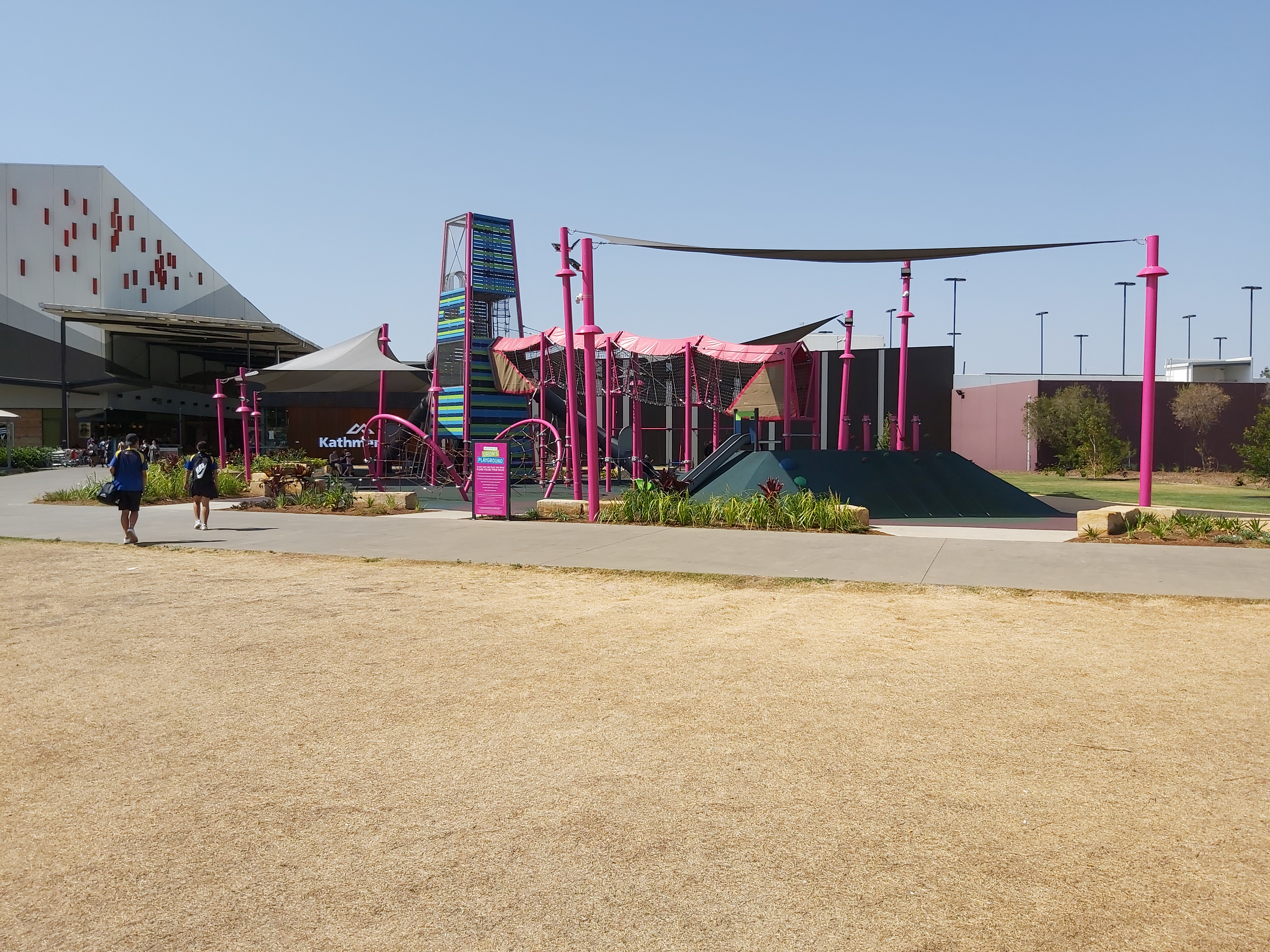
Orion playground

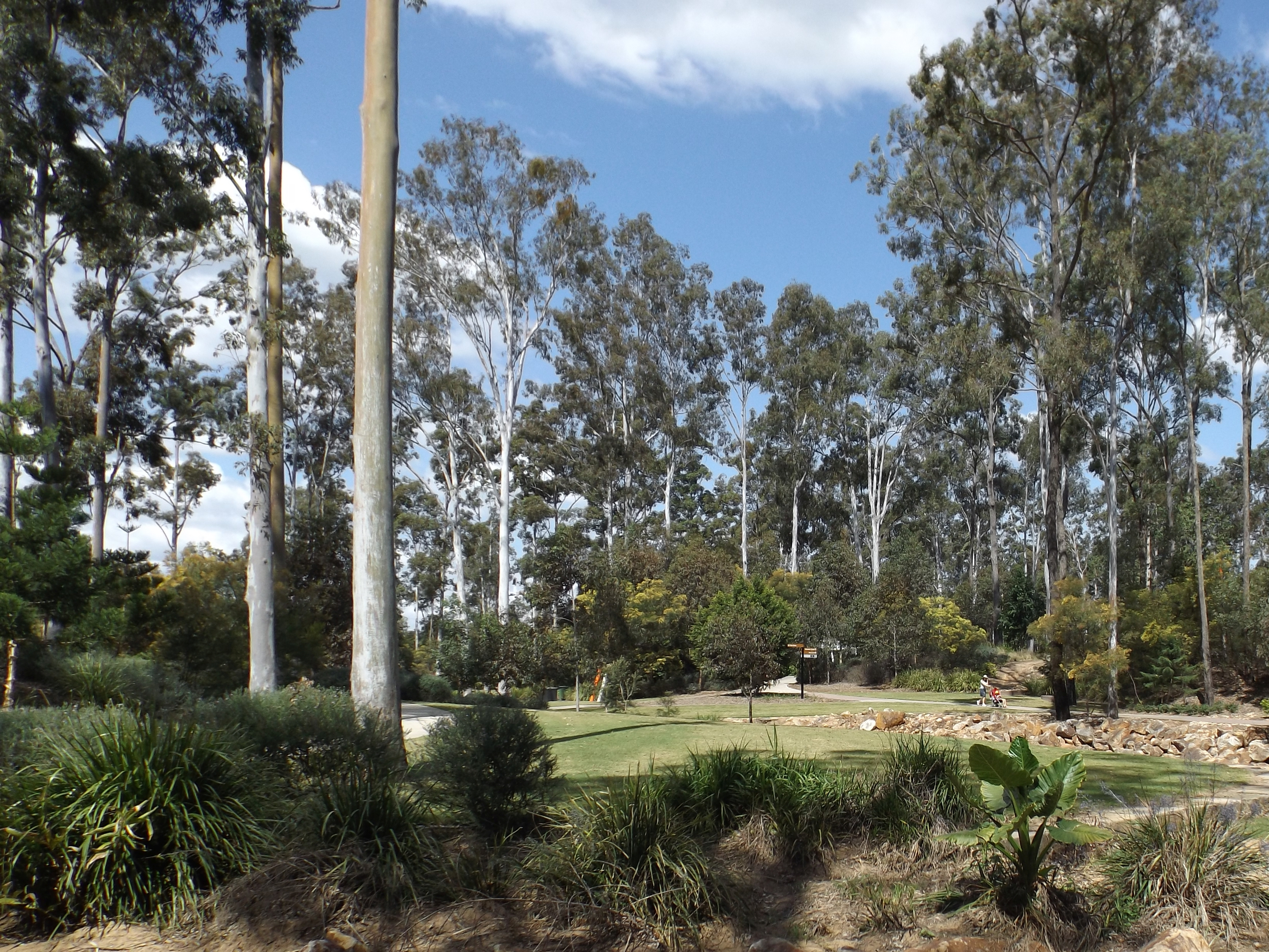
Robelle Domain parklands

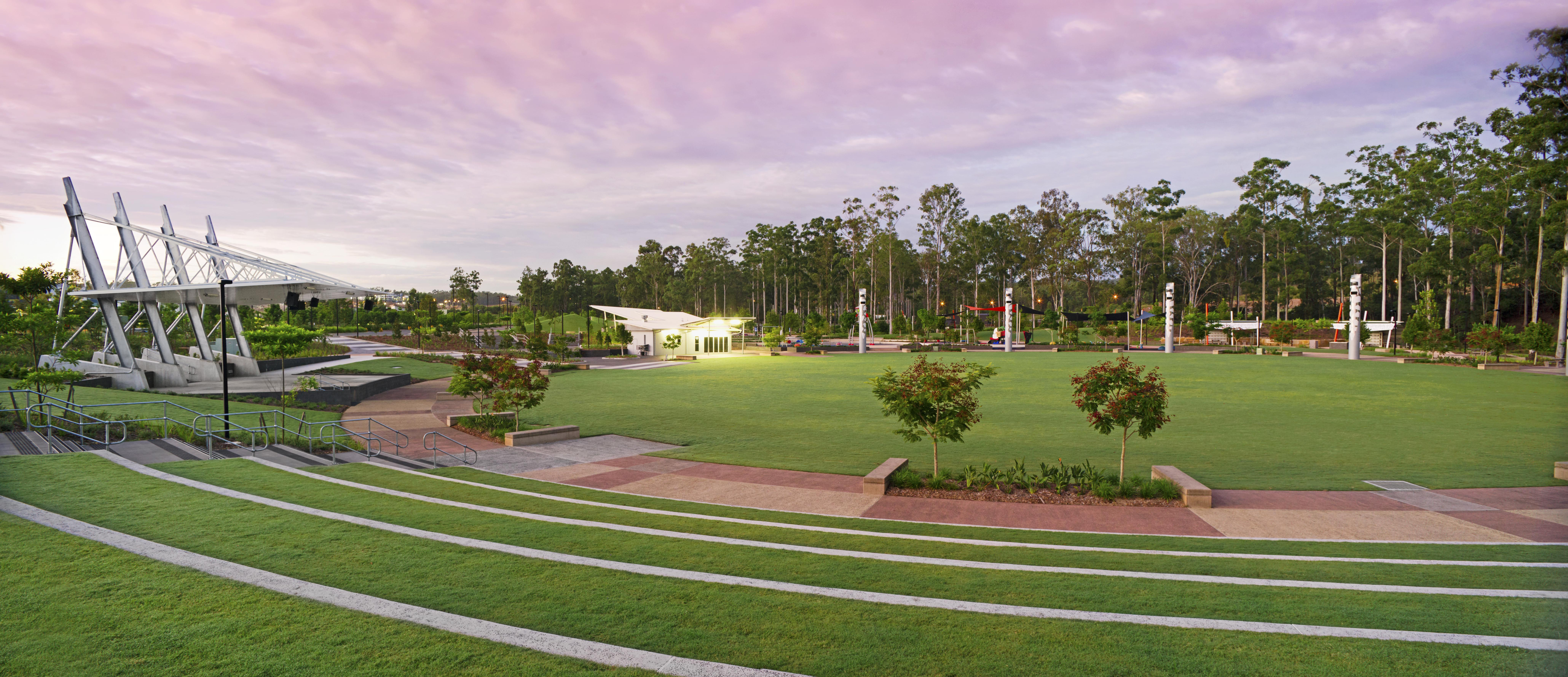
"The Circle"

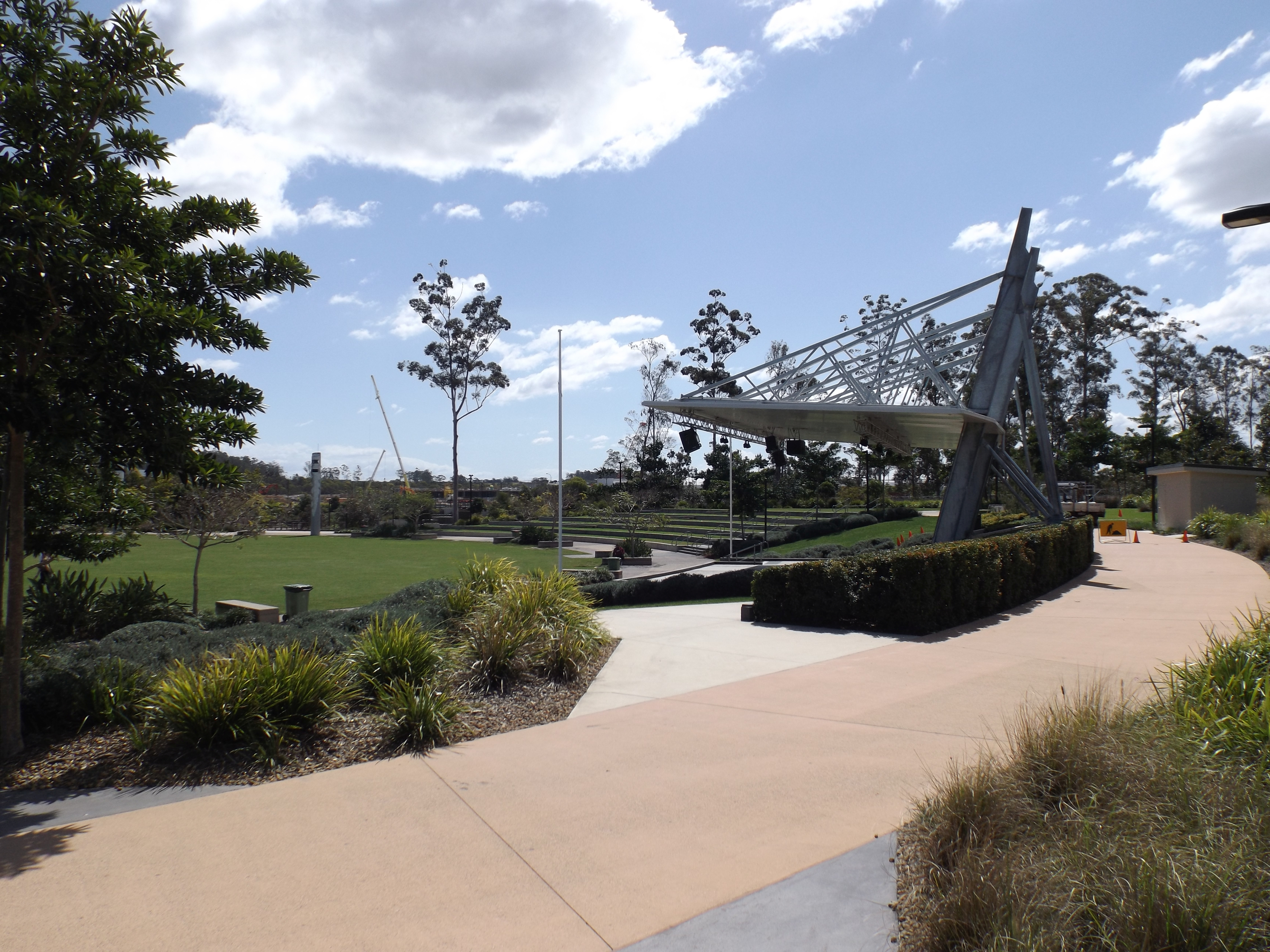
Robelle Domain stage and amphitheatre

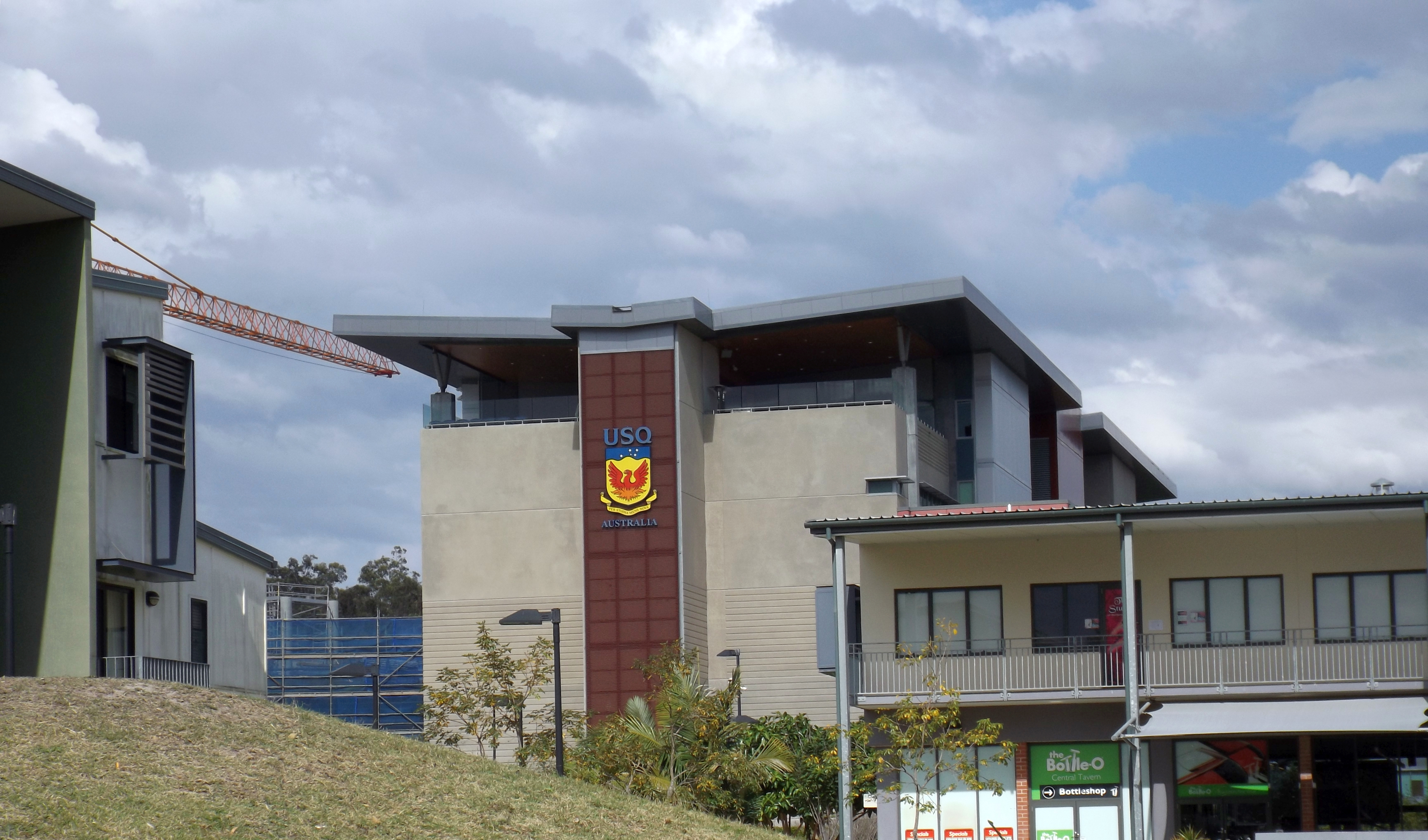
University of Southern Queensland, Springfield campus

== See also ==
- South East Queensland Regional Plan
