= Springfield, Queensland =

Springfield
- Suburb
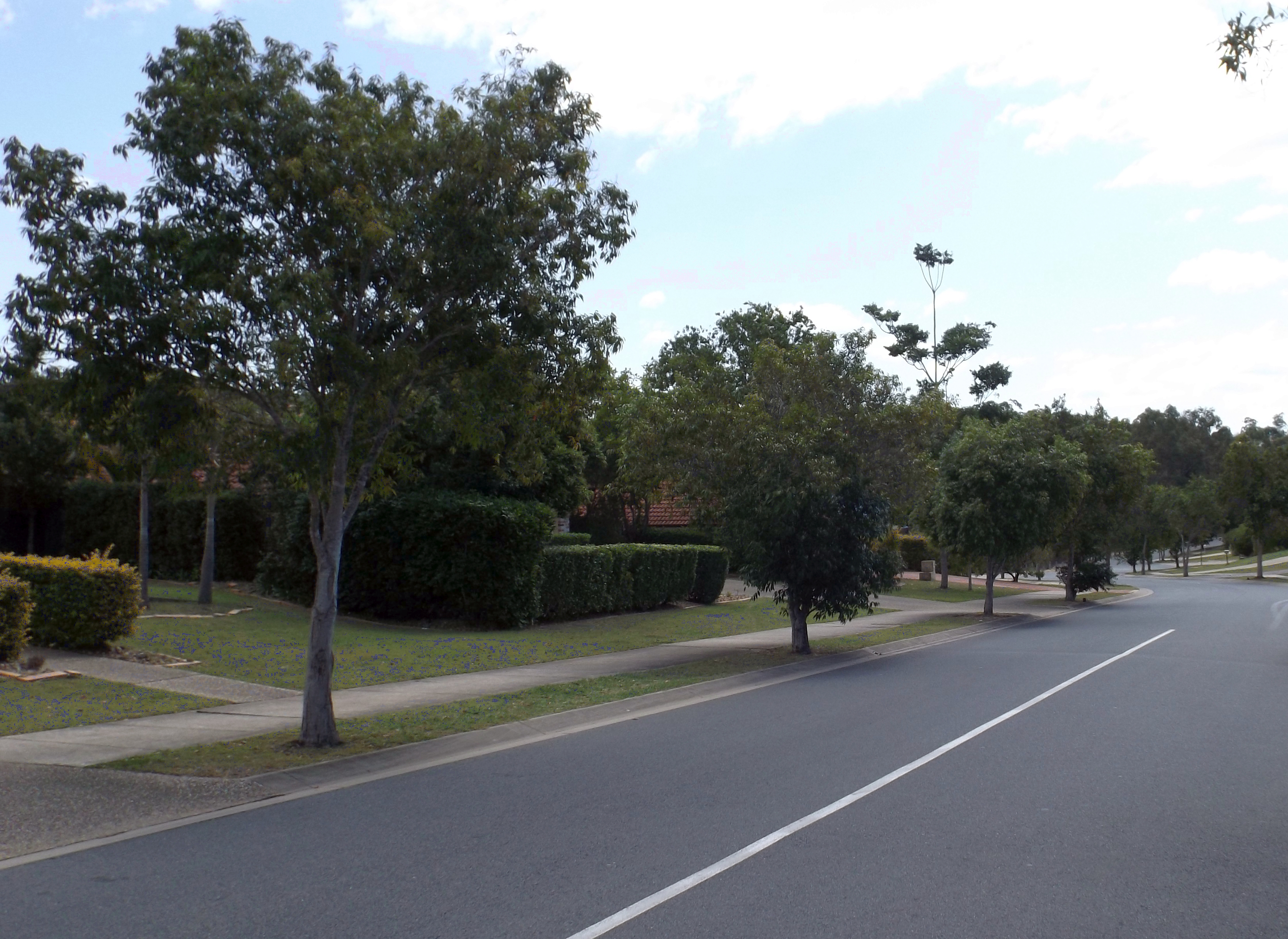
- Karamea Avenue, 2014

- Coordinates: 27.6558°S 152.9091°E
- Country: Australia
- State: Queensland
- LGA: City of Ipswich
- Location: 25.2 km (15.7 mi) E of Ipswich CBD; 28.6 km (17.8 mi) SW of Brisbane CBD

Government
  - State electorate: Jordan
  - Federal division: Oxley

Area
  - Total: 6.7 km^{2} (2.6 sq mi)

Population
  - Total: 7,322 (SAL 2021)
- Time zone: UTC+10:00 (AEST)
- Postcode: 4300
Suburbs around Springfield
Bellbird Park	Camira	Greenbank
Brookwater	Springfield	Greenbank
Springfield Central	Springfield Lakes	Springfield Lakes

Springfield is a suburb in the City of Ipswich, Queensland, Australia. In the 2021 census, Springfield had a population of 7,322 people. Springfield is in proximity of the nearby suburbs Springfield Lakes and Springfield Central.

== History ==
Springfield was built as part of Greater Springfield, which was Australia's largest master-planned community at the time of its construction. In 2007, a larger master-planned community at nearby Ripley was announced.

Springfield State School opened on 22 January 1998. On 1 January 2000, it was renamed Woodcrest State College.

The Springfield College opened on 1 July 1998.

Staines Memorial College opened 25 January 2005 in Springfield. It is named in the memory of Graham Staines, a missionary in India who was burned to death by fundamentalist Hindus in 1999. In 2010, the college relocated to Redbank Plains.

Hymba Yumba Independent School opened in 2011. It was established by Uncle Albert Holt and is based on Indigenous culture. The name comes from the Bidjara language with Hymba referring to the skills such as listening and reflecting while Yumba refers to building and refers to both the creation of the physical premises and the creation of a community around the school. When it first opened, there were 50 students enrolled with 8 staff. Today it has over 280 students and 40 staff making up the school community.

== Demographics ==
In the 2016 census, Springfield had a population of 6,772 people.

In the 2021 census, Springfield had a population of 7,322 people.

== Education ==
Woodcrest State College is a government primary and secondary (Early Childhood to Year 12) school for boys and girls at 38 Nev Smith Drive (27.6572°S 152.9184°E). In 2018, the school had an enrolment of 1,694 students with 140 teachers (131 full-time equivalent) and 78 non-teaching staff (56 full-time equivalent). It includes a special education program.

Springfield Anglican College is a private primary and secondary (Prep–12) school for boys and girls which opened on 1 July 1998. Its primary (Prep–6) campus is at Springfield College Drive (27.6564°S 152.9076°E) and its secondary (7–12) campus is at 68 Springfield Greenbank Arterial (27.6709°S 152.9064°E). In 2018, the school had an enrolment of 952 students with 74 teachers (65 full-time equivalent) and 69 non-teaching staff (43 full-time equivalent).

Hymba Yumba Independent School is a private primary and secondary (Prep–12) school at 6 Springfield Parkway (27.6642°S 152.9093°E). The school has a focus on teaching the national curriculum using Indigenous Knowledge. In 2018, the school had an enrolment of 154 students with 19 teachers (all full-time) and 19 non-teaching staff (all full-time).

== Amenities ==
The Camira Springfield Community Centre is at 389 Old Logan Road (27.6413°S 152.9170°E).

Springfield Fair is a shopping centre at 16 Springfield Parkway (27.6530°S 152.9184°E).

There are a number of parks in the suburb, including:

- Bob Gibbs Park (27.6511°S 152.9196°E)
- Bridgewater Park (27.6608°S 152.9140°E)
- Brommiley Park (27.6556°S 152.9157°E)
- Carnation Close Reserve (27.6422°S 152.9179°E)
- Clancy's Reserve (27.6645°S 152.9119°E)
- College Park (27.6593°S 152.9163°E)
- Curlew Park (27.6492°S 152.9158°E)
- Emerald Park (27.6662°S 152.9097°E)
- Escarpment Village Park (27.6689°S 152.9108°E)
- Foxglove Court Reserve (27.6456°S 152.9186°E)
- H L Jones Park (27.6456°S 152.9178°E)
- Kuring-gai Park (27.6448°S 152.9150°E)
- Lilac Park (27.6509°S 152.9139°E)
- Lloyd Bird Park (27.6421°S 152.9158°E)
- Lookout Park (27.6648°S 152.9143°E)
- M Mcguire Park (27.6478°S 152.9185°E)
- O'Dwyers Gully Park (27.6441°S 152.9103°E)
- Opossum Creek Reserve (27.6699°S 152.9094°E)
- Opossum Creek Wildlife Corridor (27.6529°S 152.8997°E)
- Outlook Park (27.6523°S 152.9133°E)

== Transport ==
Springfield is connected to the Brisbane CBD by the Centenary Motorway and the Springfield railway line, a branch of the Ipswich railway line that starts at Darra station, and extends to Springfield. The suburbs is also serviced by bus route 527, linking Goodna shopping centre and Goodna station with Orion Springfield Central via Springfield station.

== See also ==
- South East Queensland Regional Plan
