= Springfield Lakes, Queensland =

Springfield Lakes
- Suburb
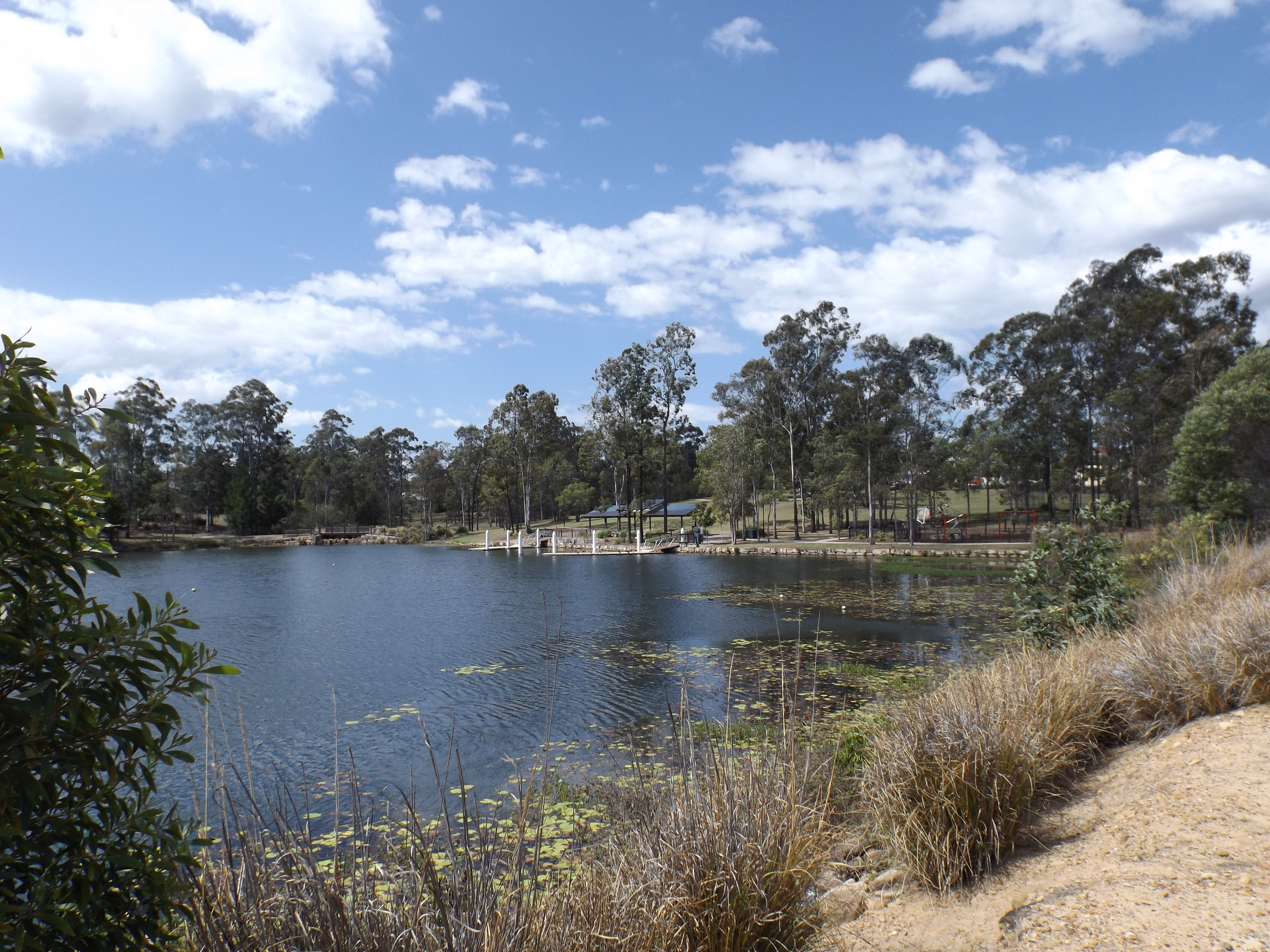
- Spring Lake, 2014

- Coordinates: 27.6827°S 152.9127°E
- Country: Australia
- State: Queensland
- LGA: City of Ipswich
- Location: 20.5 km (12.7 mi) ESE of Ipswich CBD; 34.8 km (21.6 mi) SW of Brisbane CBD

Government
  - State electorate: Jordan
  - Federal divisions: Blair; Oxley

Area
  - Total: 8.8 km^{2} (3.4 sq mi)

Population
  - Total: 17,211 (2021 census)
  - Density: 1,956/km^{2} (5,065/sq mi)
- Time zone: UTC+10:00 (AEST)
- Postcode: 4300
Suburbs around Springfield Lakes
Springfield	Camira	Greenbank
Springfield Central	Springfield Lakes	Greenbank
Spring Mountain	Spring Mountain	Greenbank

Springfield Lakes is a suburb in the City of Ipswich, Queensland, Australia. It is one of the suburbs created within Greater Springfield. In the 2021 census, Springfield Lakes had a population of 17,211 people.

== Geography ==
The Centenary Motorway forms the north-western boundary of the suburb. The Springfield railway line runs immediately parallel and north of the highway. There is a foot bridge across the motorway (27.6608°S 152.9216°E) which provides access to Springfield railway station.

The lakes from which the suburb takes its name are:

- Spring Lake (27.6669°S 152.9194°E), which is named after neighbouring Spring Mountain
- Regatta Lake (27.6758°S 152.9199°E), named for its intended use for water sports
- Discovery Lake (27.6780°S 152.9133°E), named for its adventurous surrounding terrain

Springfield Lakes was developed by Lendlease as a series of smaller neighbourhoods (villages). As of November 2015 these neighbourhoods are: Bridgewater Chase (Springfield), Clancy's Crossing (Springfield), The Escarpment (Springfield), Lakeside, Eden's Homestead, Olive Springs, Butterfly Green, The Promenade, Waterside at The Promenade, The Peninsula, The Summit, Aspect, Creekside, Lakes Entrance, Wildflower Ridge, Park Edge, Tea Trees, Central Walk, and The Sanctuary. The Peninsula is the final neighbourhood of Springfield Lakes developed immediately behind Regatta Lake and Discovery Lake.

== History ==
Springfield Lakes is one of the suburbs created within Greater Springfield, a 2,850-hectare (11.0 sq mi) site which is Australia's largest master planned community. For comparison purposes this is more than half the size of Cairns. It was officially named and bounded in 2000.

Springfield Lakes State School opened in 2007.

Good Shepherd Catholic Primary School was established in 2013 by the Catholic Education division of the Roman Catholic Archdiocese of Brisbane.

On Friday 1 September 2017, Our Lady of the Southern Cross Catholic Church was officially opened and blessed by Archbishop Mark Coleridge, as the first Catholic church in Greater Springfield. Prior to its opening, Catholic services had been held at St Augustine's College in Augustine Heights.

== Demographics ==
In the 2016 census Springfield Lakes had a population of 15,318 people.

In the 2021 census, Springfield Lakes had a population of 17,211 people.

== Transport ==
The suburb is serviced by bus route 528, which links Springfield station with Springfield Central station, and bus route 533, which forms a bi-directional loop through the southern part of Springfield Lakes. Apart from bus services, the suburb also has access to rail services with the northern part of Springfield Lakes being serviced by Springfield railway station while the southern part of the suburb is serviced by Springfield Central railway station across from Orion Springfield Central shopping centre.

== Education ==
Springfield Lakes State School is a government primary (Prep–6) school for boys and girls at 63 Springfield Lakes Boulevard (27.6705°S 152.9221°E). In 2018, the school had an enrolment of 1122 students with 77 teachers (68 full-time equivalent) and 44 non-teaching staff (30 full-time equivalent). It includes a special education program.

Good Shepherd Catholic Primary School is a Catholic primary (Prep–6) school for boys and girls at 58 Opperman Drive (27.6959°S 152.9101°E). In 2018, the school had an enrolment of 267 students with 17 teachers (15 full-time equivalent) and 14 non-teaching staff (9 full-time equivalent).

There are no secondary schools in Springfield Lakes. The nearest government secondary schools are Springfield Central State High School in neighbouring Springfield Central to the west and Woodcrest State College in neighbouring Springfield to the north-west.

== Amenities ==
Our Lady of the Southern Cross Catholic Church is at 58 Opperman Drive (27.6961°S 152.9100°E) adjacent to the Catholic school.

Vedanta Centre Brisbane is located at 96 Vedanta Drive

== Attractions ==
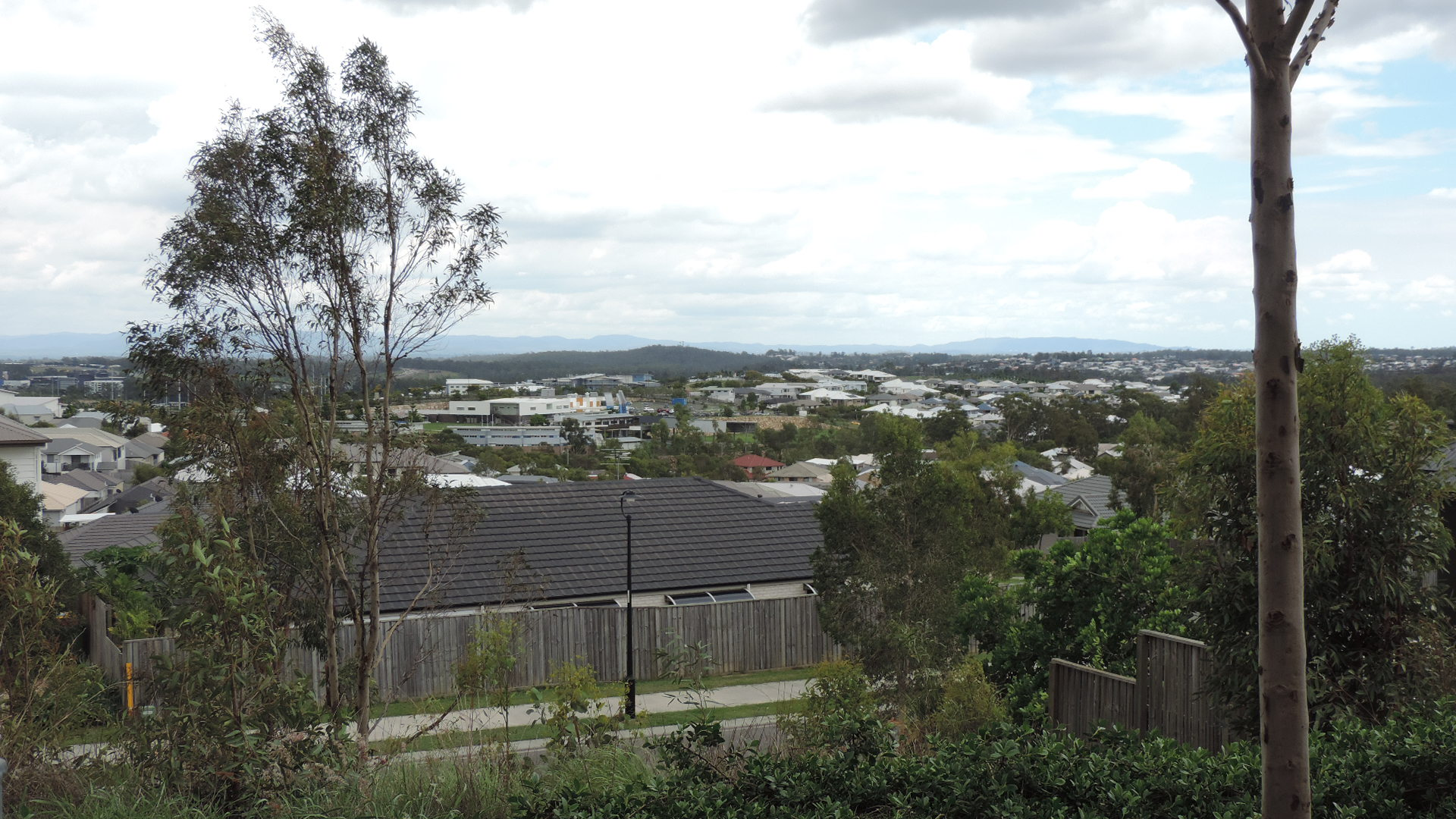
View of Springfield Lakes from Marsdenia Lookout, 2021

Marsdenia Lookout is accessed from the north-west corner of Angelica Drive and Dandelion Drive (27.70185°S 152.9109°E). It offers views across the Greater Springfield area.
