= White Rock, Queensland (Ipswich) =

White Rock Ipswich, Queensland
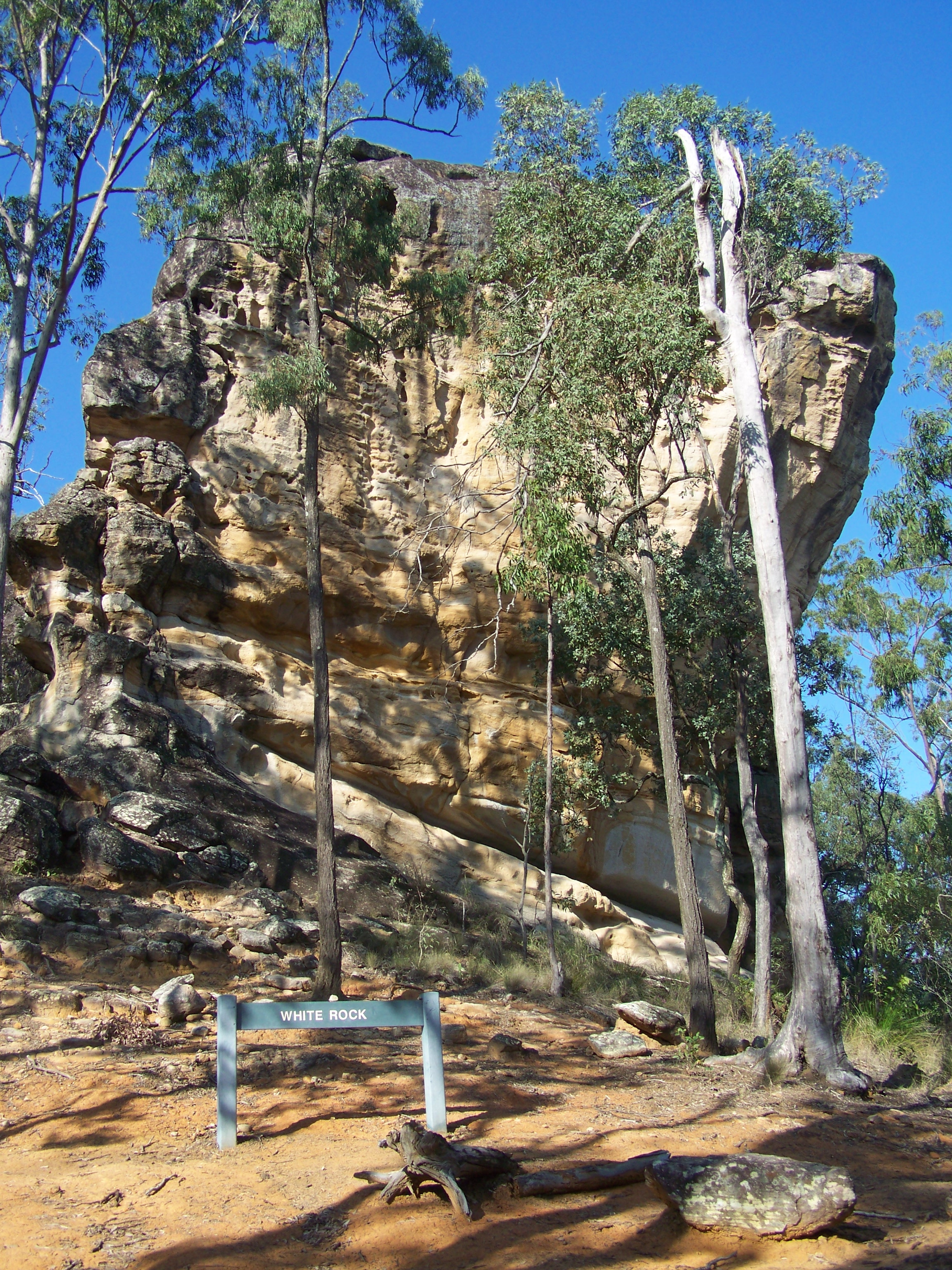
- White Rock Spring Mountain Conservation Reserve

- Coordinates: 27.695°S 152.8488°E
- Population: 0 (2021 census)
  - Density: 0.000/km^{2} (0.00/sq mi)
- Postcode(s): 4306
- Area: 17.4 km^{2} (6.7 sq mi)
- Time zone: AEST (UTC+10:00)
- Location: 6.2 km (4 mi) ENE of South Ripley; 8.2 km (5 mi) W of Springfield Central; 15.2 km (9 mi) SE of Ipswich CBD; 38.6 km (24 mi) SW of Brisbane CBD
- LGA(s): City of Ipswich
- State electorate(s): Bundamba
- Federal division(s): Blair
Suburbs around White Rock:
Swanbank	Redbank Plains	Redbank Plains
South Ripley	White Rock	Spring Mountain
South Ripley	South Ripley	Spring Mountain

White Rock is a locality in the City of Ipswich, Queensland, Australia. In the 2021 census, White Rock had "no people or a very low population". However, White Rock is being developed as a suburb with an initial 2,300 home sites planned.

== Geography ==
The Centenary Motorway passes through the north-west of the locality.

The western half of White Rock lies with the catchment of the Bremer River and the eastern half within the Brisbane River catchment.

Three sections of the White Rock Conservation Park are in the north of the locality.

As at 2025, new streets and houses are being constructed in the south-west of the locality. Upgrades of visitor facilities are planned for the White Rock Conservation Park to facilitate greater recreational use of the park.

== History ==
White Rock is situated in the Yugarabul traditional Aboriginal country of the Brisbane and surrounding regions.

== Demographics ==
In the 2016 census, White Rock had "no people or a very low population".

In the 2021 census, White Rock had "no people or a very low population".

== Education ==
There are no schools in White Rock. The nearest government primary schools are:

- Ripley Valley State School in neighbouring South Ripley to the west
- Fernbrooke State School in neighbouring Redbank Plains to the north
- Spring Mountain State School in neighbouring Spring Mountain to the east

The nearest government secondary schools are:

- Ripley Valley State Secondary College in South Ripley
- Springfield Central State High School in Springfield Central to the east

== Attractions ==
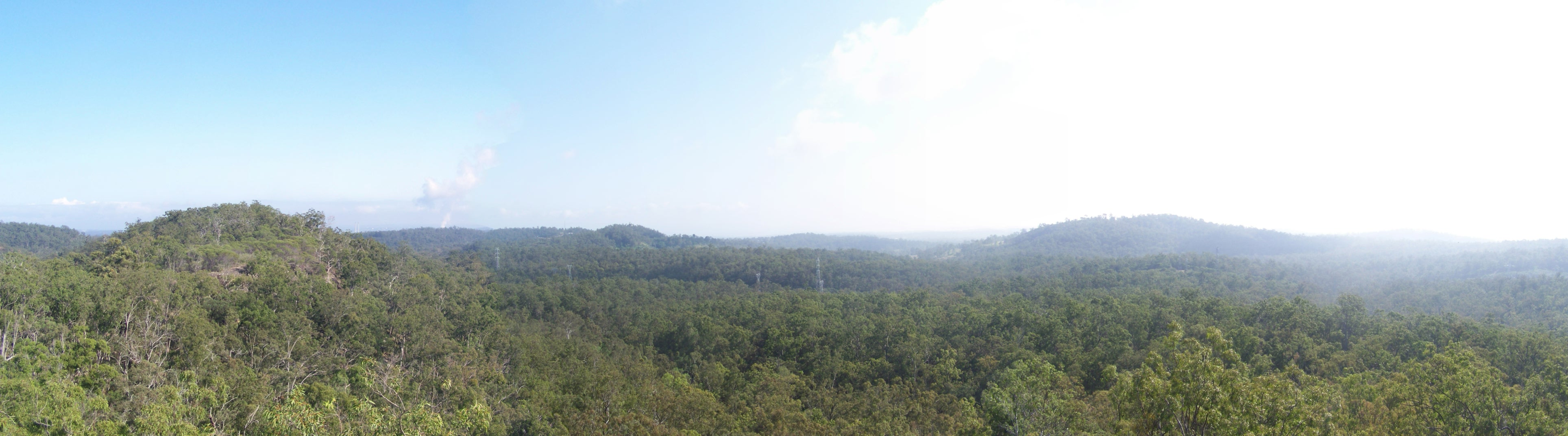
Bushland surrounding White Rock, 2010

The White Rock Conservation Park, now known as the White Rock – Spring Mountain Conservation Estate, is accessed by White Rock Drive from Redbank Plains. It is used for bushwalking and horse riding during the day. Camping and pets are not permitted.
