= White Rock, Queensland =

White Rock, Queensland may refer to:

- White Rock, Queensland (Cairns Region)
- White Rock, Queensland (Ipswich)
