= Greenbank, Queensland =

Greenbank
- Suburb
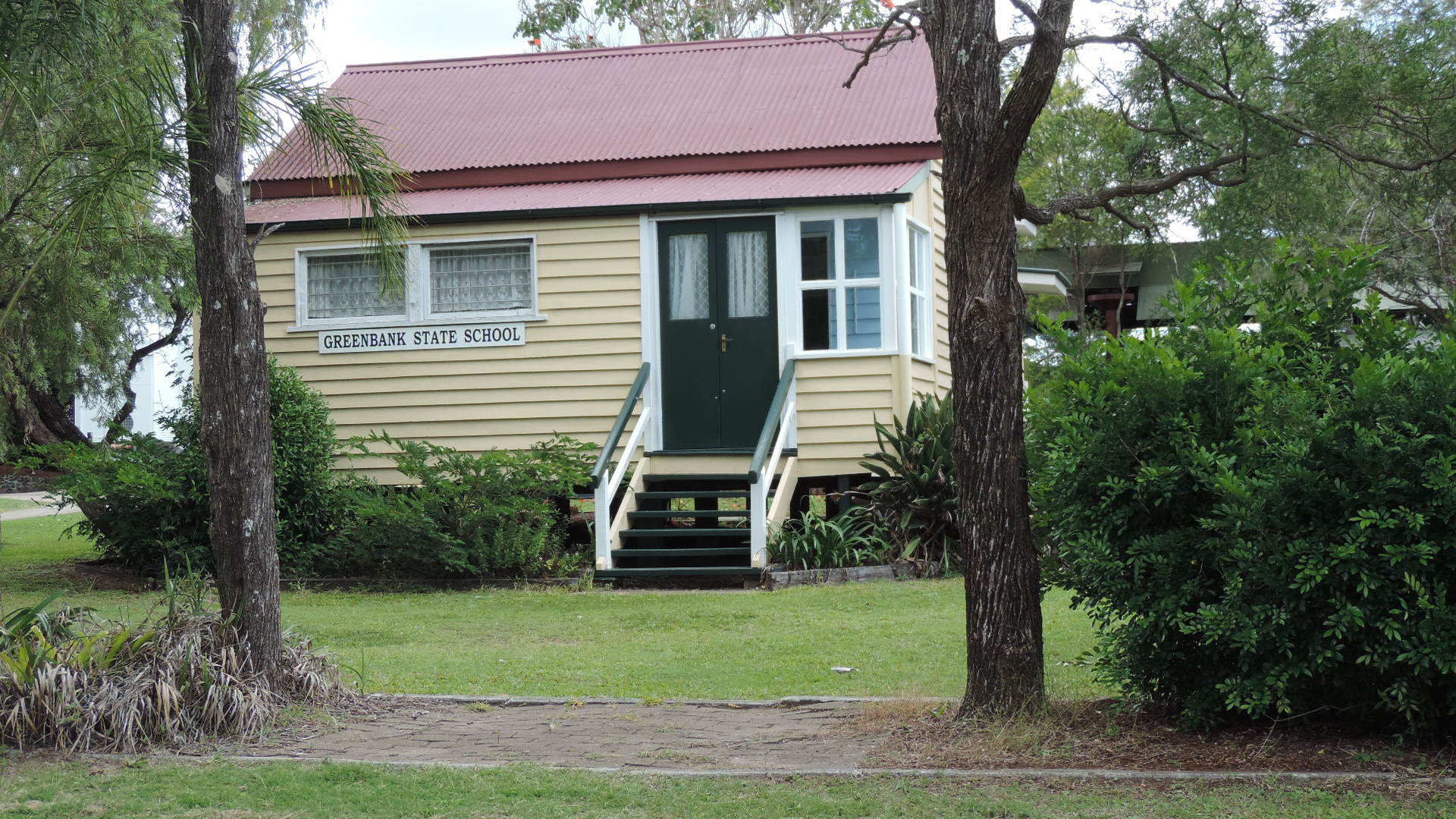
- Original Greenbank State School building, 2014

- Interactive map of Greenbank
- Coordinates: 27.6913°S 152.9558°E
- Country: Australia
- State: Queensland
- City: Logan City
- LGA: Logan City
- Location: 9.0 km (5.6 mi) E of Springfield Central; 21.0 km (13.0 mi) SW of Logan Central; 41.5 km (25.8 mi) S of Brisbane CBD

Government
  - State electorate: Jordan
  - Federal division: Wright

Area
  - Total: 110.5 km^{2} (42.7 sq mi)

Population
  - Total: 9,587 (2021 census)
  - Density: 86.76/km^{2} (224.71/sq mi)
- Time zone: UTC+10:00 (AEST)
- Postcode: 4124
Suburbs around Greenbank
Heathwood; Forestdale	Forest Lake	Camira; Carole Park
Springfield; Springfield Lakes	Greenbank	Boronia Heights; Park Ridge
Spring Mountain; Lyons	New Beith	Munruben; North Maclean

Greenbank is a rural residential suburb in the City of Logan, Queensland, Australia. In the 2021 census, Greenbank had a population of 9,587 people.

== Geography ==
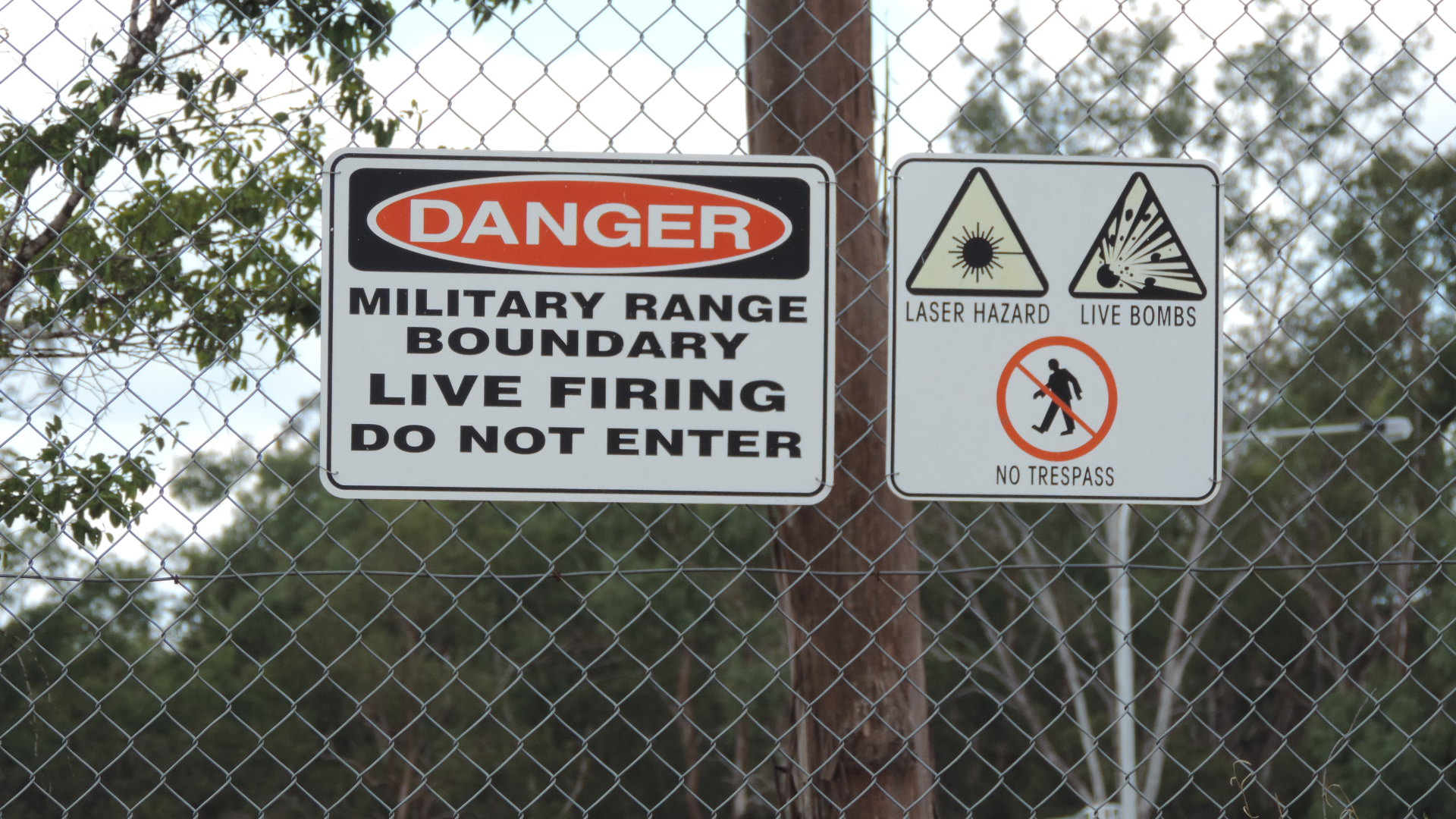
Danger sign, Greenbank Military Range, 2014

It is located 30 kilometres (19 mi) south of central Brisbane. It was once divided between the Shire of Beaudesert and Logan City, but the Queensland Government's amalgamation of local government areas resulted in Greenbank becoming entirely within Logan City, since 15 March 2008.

The suburb is surrounded by farmland and includes the forested Greenbank Military Range (27.7068°S 152.9884°E), which is on the Commonwealth Heritage List. A strip of parkland and a watercourse originally named The Platypus Pools and Bracken Way is a natural habitat for a number of species of flora and fauna including platypus, the rare black cockatoo, kookaburra, the blue wren, kingfisher, honeyeaters, owls, kangaroos, wallabies, koalas, possums, bearded dragons, legless lizards and water monitors up to 2.5 metres in length. Many more species have been sighted living in this natural habitat. The watercourse and natural forest are fed by torrential rains and natural springs dotted throughout the Spring Mountain area, continuing through to Greenbank, Browns Plains and finishing at Karrawatha National Park. Snakes, mostly consisting of python, whip snakes and red-bellied black snakes, and to a much lesser degree brown snakes. Bird-eating spiders, huntsman spiders, redback spiders and the orb-weaver spider also share the watercourse and forest area.

The parkland stretches along on either side of the watercourse and a variety of walking tracks of different fitness levels are used by residents for casual strolls, nature lovers and athletic enthusiasts, horse and bike riding. The tracks extend out into estates of Greenbank; such as Blue Grass, New Beith, Lyons and Teviot Downs Estates which cover more forested areas, while Spring Mountain Estate contains the natural forest areas and watercourse. The walking track connects with neighbouring Boronia Heights.

== History ==
Greenbank is situated in the Yugarabul traditional Aboriginal country of the Brisbane and surrounding regions. Towards the south of Greenbank is the Bundjalung traditional Aboriginal country.

The early name of the district was Teviot but derives its present name Greenbank from the name of a cattle property belonging to William Slack.

Greenbank was first settled by Europeans in the 1840s. In the 1880s the main industries were dairying, farming and timber cutting. Cobb & Co had a changing station for their coaches at a hotel on the corner of Teviot Road and Pub Lane; from there, they would travel to Beaudesert via the Old Paradise Road between Acacia Ridge and Jimboomba. When the coach service ceased in 1924, the hotel licence lapsed.

Greenbank Provisional School was built by volunteer labour and opened on 23 January 1893 with 12 pupils under teacher Mary Mulroney who received an annual salary of £50. It became Greenbank State School on 1 January 1909. It closed between 1943 and 1950 due to low student numbers.

The railway went through Greenbank in 1930.

The post office was opened in the 1950s.

Everleigh State School opened in January 2022.

== Demographics ==
The population of Greenbank in 1996 was 5,098 people and 84% of the homes in Greenbank were owner-occupied. By 2001, the population was 5,261 showing a population growth of 3% in the area during that time. 86% of the homes in Greenbank were owner-occupied.

In the 2011 census, Greenbank recorded a population of 7,328 people, 49.4% female and 50.6% male. The median age of the Greenbank population was 36 years, 1 year below the national median of 37. 75.1% of people living in Greenbank were born in Australia. The other top responses for country of birth were England 5.8%, New Zealand 5.5%, Vietnam 0.9%, Taiwan 0.7%, South Africa 0.6%. 87.6% of people spoke only English at home; the next most common languages were 1.5% Vietnamese, 1.1% Mandarin, 0.6% Hmong, 0.5% Mon-Khmer, 0.5% Spanish.

In the 2016 census, Greenbank had a population of 7,694 people, 49.8% female and 50.2% male. The median age of the Greenbank population was 39 years, 1 year above the national median of 38. 74.9% of people living in Greenbank were born in Australia. The other top responses for country of birth were England 5.3%, New Zealand 4.9%, South Africa 0.9%, Vietnam 0.8% and Taiwan 0.7%. 86.3% of people spoke only English at home; the next most common languages were 1.3% Vietnamese, 1.1% Mandarin, 1.0% Hmong, 0.5% Khmer and 0.4% Hindi.

In the 2021 census, Greenbank had a population of 9,587 people, 49.5% female and 50.5% male. The median age of the Greenbank population was 37 years, 1 year below the national median of 38. 72.4% of people living in Greenbank were born in Australia. The other top responses for country of birth were New Zealand 5.4%, England 4.4%, India 1.9%, South Africa 1.0%, and the Philippines 0.5%. 82.6% of people spoke only English at home; the next most common languages were 1.6% Punjabi, 1.1% Hmong, 1.0% Vietnamese, 0.9% Mandarin, and 0.8% Hindi.

== Education ==
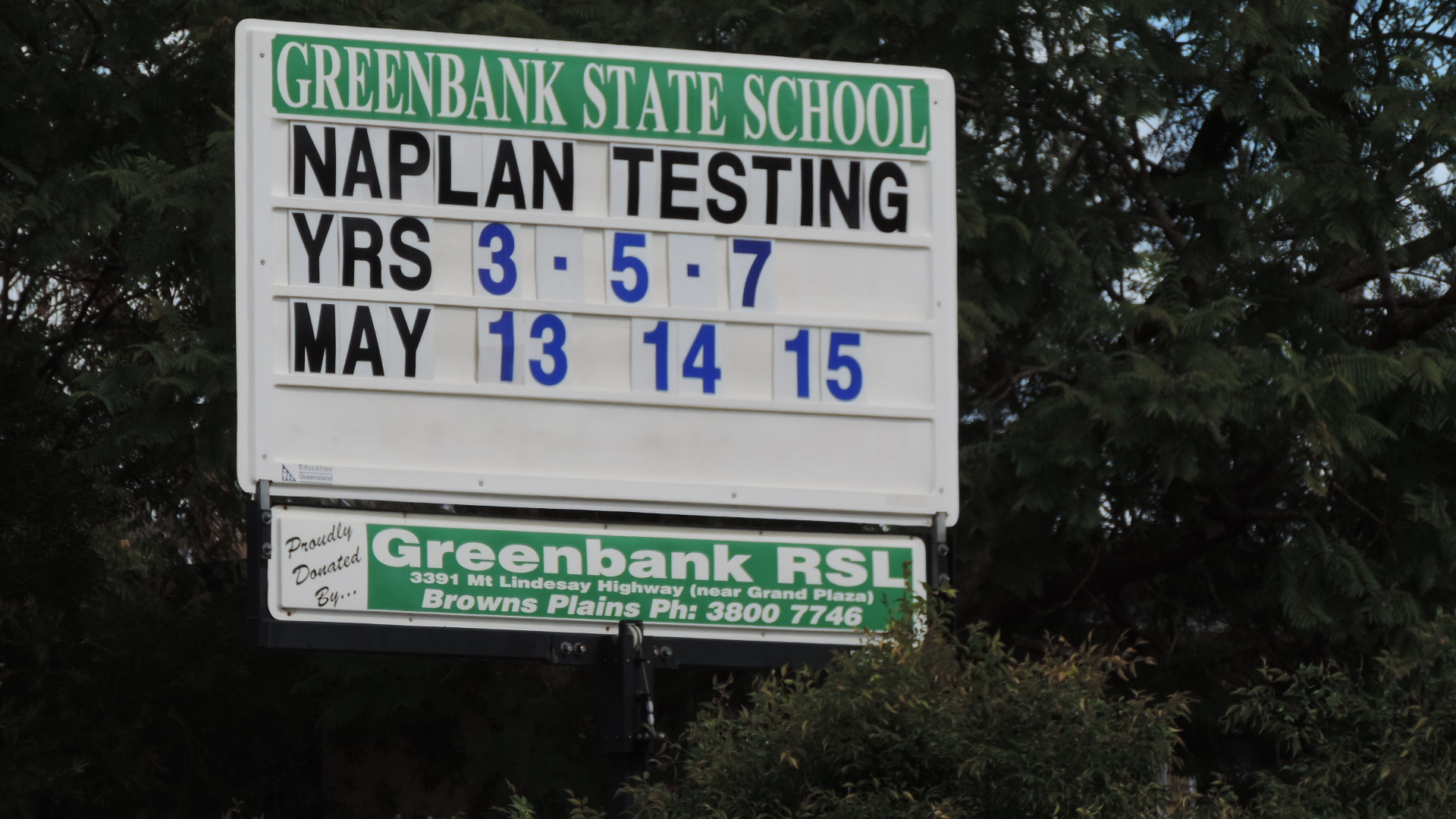
Sign announcing NAPLAN tests, Greenbank State School, 2014

Greenbank State School is a government primary (Prep-6) school for boys and girls at 12-54 Goodna Road (27.7103°S 152.9776°E). In 2013, the school had an enrolment of 1,117 students with 72 teachers (63 full-time equivalent). In 2018, the school had an enrolment of 1,048 students with 76 teachers (66 full-time equivalent) and 37 non-teaching staff (25 full-time equivalent). It includes a special education program.

Everleigh State School is a government primary (Prep-6) school for boys and girls at 46-76 Ivory Parkway (27.7391°S 152.9956°E). It opened in January 2022. As at October 2024, the school has an enrolment of 602 students.

There are no secondary schools in Greenbank. The nearest government secondary schools are Park Ridge State High School in neighbouring Park Ridge to the east and Springfield Central State High School in Springfield Central to the west.

== Amenities ==
The Greenbank Community Centre and Library, operated since March 2008 by the Logan City Council, is located at 145-167 Teviot Road (27.73040°S 152.98357°E).

There are a number of parks in the area, including:

- Andrew Josey Gully (27.6956°S 152.9299°E)
- Argyle Road Park (27.7270°S 152.9634°E)
- Bradley Court Park (27.7273°S 152.9361°E)
- Butterfly Park (27.6747°S 152.9296°E)
- Greenbank Meadows Park (27.7270°S 153.0039°E)
- Greenwood Lakes (27.6626°S 152.9954°E)
- Habitat Springs (27.6666°S 152.9301°E)
- Lance Road Park (27.7440°S 152.9764°E)
- Lyndale Road Park (27.7257°S 152.9269°E)
- Oxley Creek (27.7006°S 152.9348°E)
- Oxley Creek Park (27.7295°S 152.9168°E)
- Pub Lane Park (27.7350°S 152.9629°E)
- Roberts Road Park (27.7299°S 152.9470°E)
- Thompson Road Park (27.7016°S 152.9598°E)
- Tully Connection Road Par (27.7384°S 152.9251°E)
- White Rock- Spring Mountain Conservation Estate (27.7154°S 152.8903°E)
- Woodfall Road Park (27.7232°S 152.9725°E)

== Sports ==
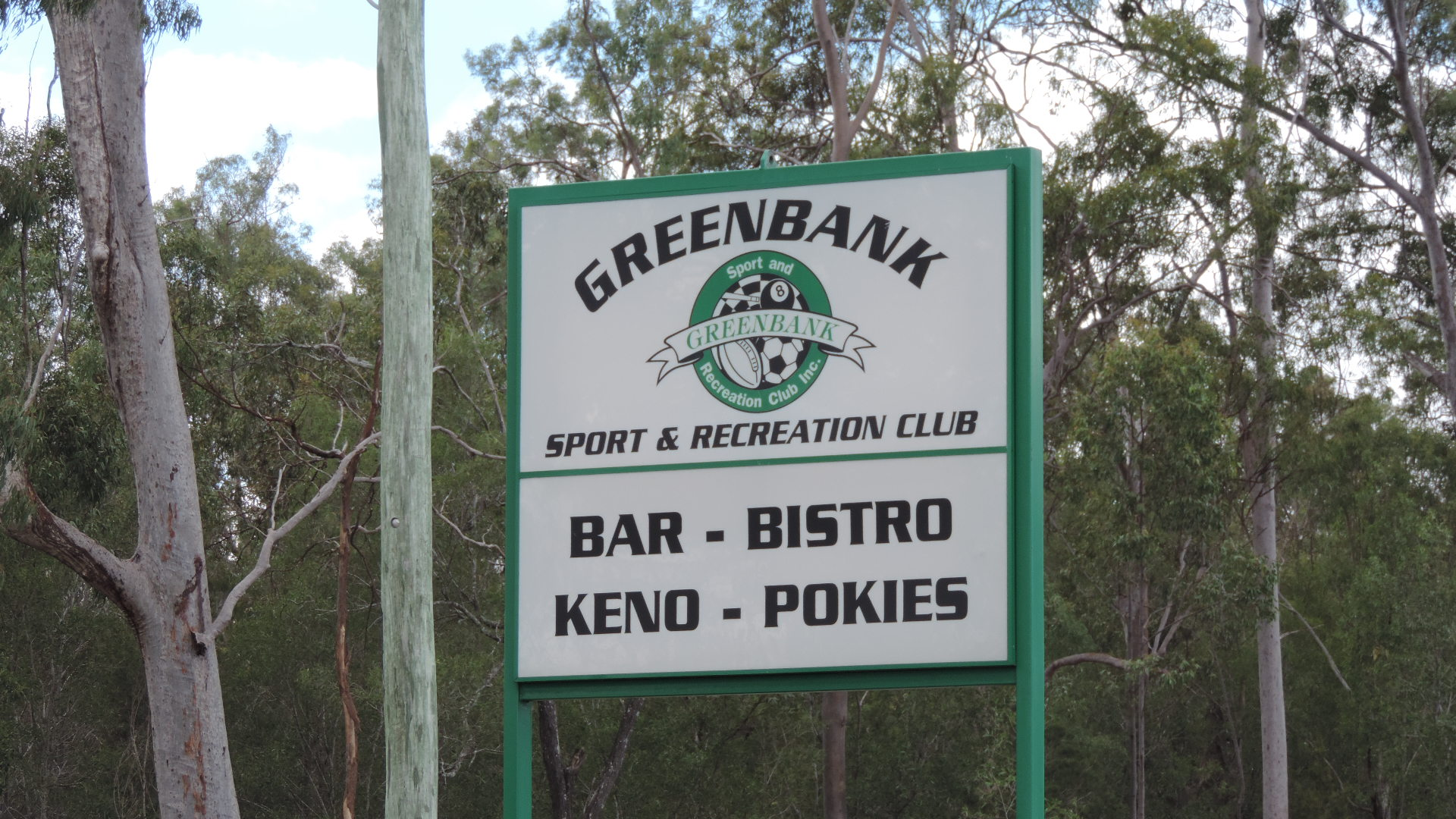
Sign, Greenbank Sports & Recreation Club, 2014

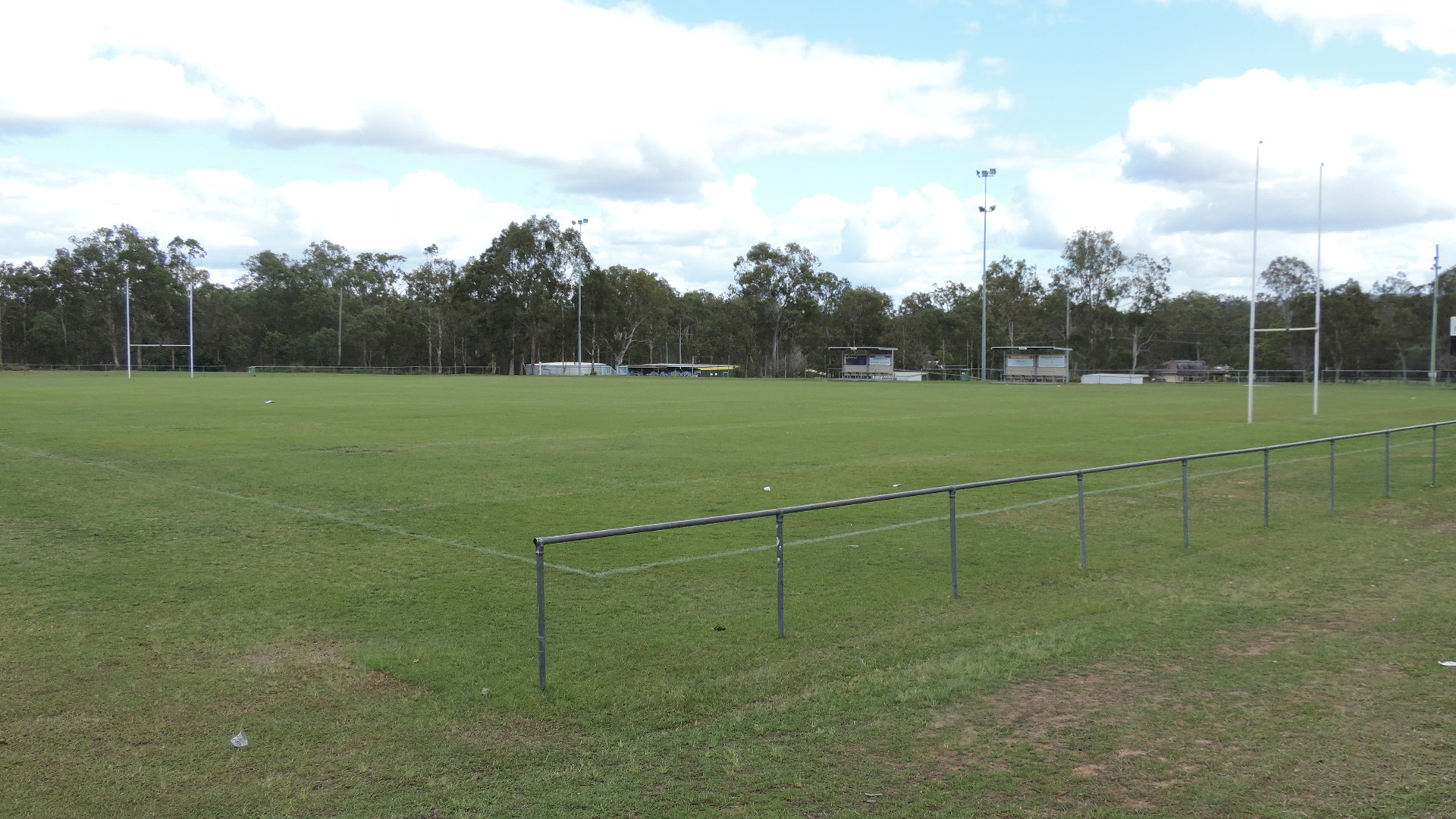
Football field, Greenbank, 2014

The Greenbank Recreation Reserve is home to the Greenbank Sports & Recreation Club and the Greenbank Raiders Rugby League Club. Situated on Middle Rd (27.71971°S 152.98365°E) the rugby club caters for teams from under 6 to under 18 in 2009. Three teams won premierships in 2009. Under 15 division 4, Under 18 division 1 and the very successful under 16 division 2 which completed the year undefeated. They were minor premiers and won the grand final.

Greenbank is also home to the successful Greenbank Football Club. In 2011, the team made history by winning three senior Premierships and two Championships in three divisions. Greenbank FC is affiliated with Football Brisbane and provides an avenue for both junior and senior players. In 2011, Greenbank FC fielded teams from squirts up to under 14 age groups and both men and women teams. 2016 was Greenbank FC's 40th anniversary.
