= Woodcrest State College =

Location
- 38 Nev Smith Drive; Springfield, Queensland; Australia; 27.658°S 152.92°E

Information
- Type: Public, college
- Motto: Discover, Achieve, Succeed
- Established: 1998
- Executive Principal: Deborah Hansen
- Secondary Principal: Kelsey Oakes
- Primary Principal: Pamela Kondys
- Grades: P–12
- Enrolment: 1,719 (2022)
- Colours: Black, green and gold
- Website: woodcrestsc.eq.edu.au

Woodcrest State College is a co-educational public Prep to Year 12 school located in the City of Ipswich suburb of Springfield in Queensland, Australia. The school has a total enrolment of 1,719 students in 2022.

Between 1998 and 2022, Pat Murphy was the Executive Principal of Woodcrest State College. In 2022, Jeff Jones was the Executive Principal of the school. Since 2023, Woodcrest State College's role of Executive Principal has been held by Deborah Hansen. The school also consists of a Dean of the College, a Business Manager, 2 Deputy Primary Principals and 3 Deputy Secondary Principals.

== Sporting houses ==
Woodcrest State College includes the following four sporting houses with their respective colours:

House name	Colour(s)
Bandicoots	Green
Falcons	Red
Kingfishers	purple
Wallabies	Yellow

== Facilities ==
Facilities at Woodcrest State College include:

- Primary Resource Centre (Prep to Year 6 library facility)
- Secondary Resource Centre (Year 7 to Year 12 library facility)
- The Hangar; a technology hub located in the Secondary School precinct
- The Nest; a catering facility
- Primary sports hall
- Secondary sports hall & gymnasium
- Dance & Drama studio
- Auditorium
- Manual Arts facilities
- Science laboratories
- Two sports ovals
- Multipurpose sports courts
- Tennis courts
- Homework Centre (Year 7 to 12 learning facility)
- iThrive (Year 7 to 12 student wellbeing hub)
- Secondary Basketball Courts

== Curriculum ==
=== Signature programs ===
==== Catalyst Program ====
The Catalyst Program is a four-year program that enables students to engage in academically rigorous, inquiry-based learning in order to attain academic excellence. These students have opportunities to engage in innovative learning experiences in which they solve real-world problems with the aid of emerging technologies.

==== Academy Sports Programs ====
Woodcrest State College includes the Academy Sports Programs of the Basketball Academy, the Volleyball Academy and the AFL School of Excellence. Students selected in one of these programs are offered high-level coaching with access to elite competitions.

==== WesTEC Trade Training Centre ====
The WesTEC Trade Training Centre is a national Trade Training Centre operated by Woodcrest State College in partnership with Forest Lake State High School, Redbank Plains State High School and Springfield Central State High School. WesTEC's training partner, TAFE South West, provides industry standard training to Years 11 and 12 students in a range of training areas including automotive, construction, engineering, hairdressing, health support services and logistics.

=== Vocational Education & Training ===
Vocational Education & Training (VET) courses available to students in Years 11 and 12 include:

- Certificate II in Hospitality (SIT20207)
- Certificate II in Music Industry (CUA20615)
- Certificate II in Skills for Work and Vocational Pathways (FSK20113)
- Certificate II in Sport & Recreation (SIS20115)
- Certificate II in Visual Arts (CUA20715)
- Certificate III in Business (BSB30115)
- Certificate III in Fitness (SIS30315)

== Notable alumni ==
- Ashleigh Barty, former tennis player and cricketer
