= Spring Mountain, Queensland =

Spring Mountain
- Suburb
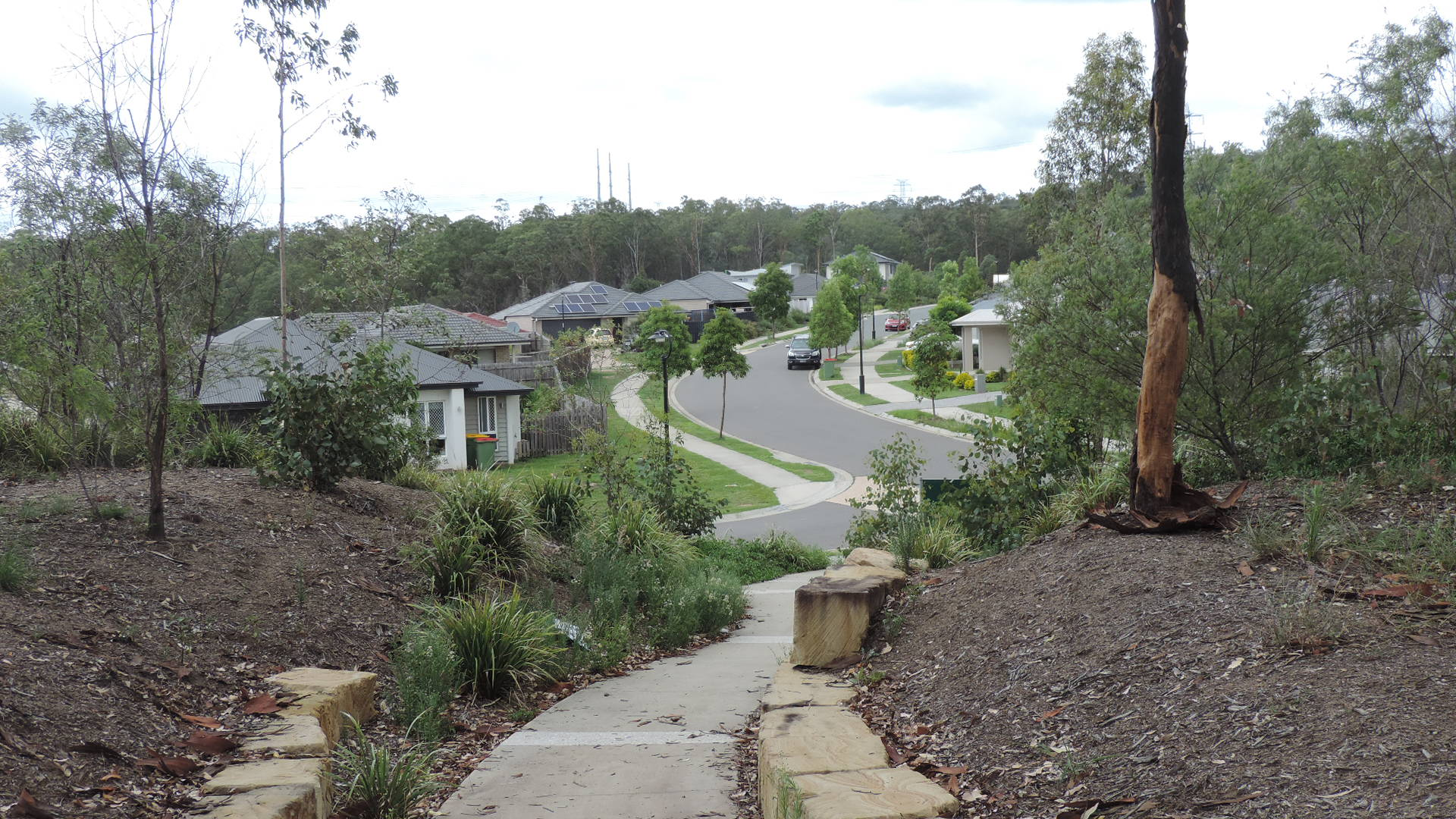
- View of Spring Mountain from the Marsdenia Lookout, 2021

- Interactive map of Spring Mountain
- Coordinates: 27.7069°S 152.8830°E
- Country: Australia
- State: Queensland
- City: Ipswich
- LGA: City of Ipswich
- Location: 2.2 km (1.4 mi) SW of Springfield Central; 19.6 km (12.2 mi) SE of Ipswich CBD; 36.9 km (22.9 mi) SW of Brisbane CBD

Government
  - State electorates: Bundamba; Jordan
  - Federal division: Blair

Population
  - Total: 6,085 (2021 census)
- Time zone: UTC+10:00 (AEST)
- Postcode: 4300
Suburbs around Spring Mountain
Redbank Plains	Augustine Heights	Springfield Central
White Rock	Spring Mountain	Springfield Lakes
South Ripley	Greenbank	Greenbank

Spring Mountain is a developing locality in the City of Ipswich, Queensland, Australia. In the 2021 census, Spring Mountain had a population of 6,085 people.

== History ==
Spring Mountain was developed as part of Greater Springfield, Queensland Australia's largest master-planned community.

As of March 2024 the development of Spring Mountain, known as Springfield Rise, consists of eight neighbourhoods; The Boulevard, Creekwood, The Crossing, Forest Ridge, The Highlands, Park Lane, Sunset Ridge, and Valley View.

Spring Mountain State School opened in 2019, with 55 pupils were enrolled on the first day of the first term. It was built with a maximum capacity of 760 students.

== Demographics ==
In the 2016 census, Spring Mountain had "no people or a very low population". Since then, land in the north-east of the locality has been developed for residential use and land sales are occurring and housing constructed.

In the 2021 census, Spring Mountain had a population of 6,085 people.

== Education ==
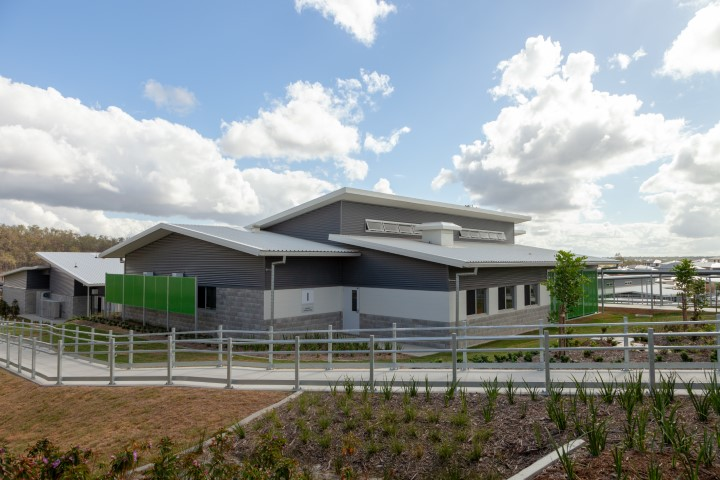
Spring Mountain State School, 2019

Spring Mountain State School is a government primary (Prep-6) school for boys and girls at 56 Dublin Avenue (27.6871°S 152.8907°E). In 2020, the school had an enrolment of 195 students with 18 teachers (17 full-time equivalent) and 6 non-teaching staff (less than 5 full-time equivalent).

There are no secondary schools in Spring Mountain. The nearest government secondary school is Springfield Central State High School in neighbouring Springfield Central to the north-east.

== Transport ==
Spring Mountain has been served by bus route 533 since January 2020. The service comprises a loop service from Spring Mountain to Orion Shopping Centre and Springfield Central railway station, running twice an hour on weekdays.
