= Centenary Motorway =

Motorway in Brisbane, Australia

Coordinates: 27°38′54.77″S 152°55′59.76″E

Centenary Motorway Queensland
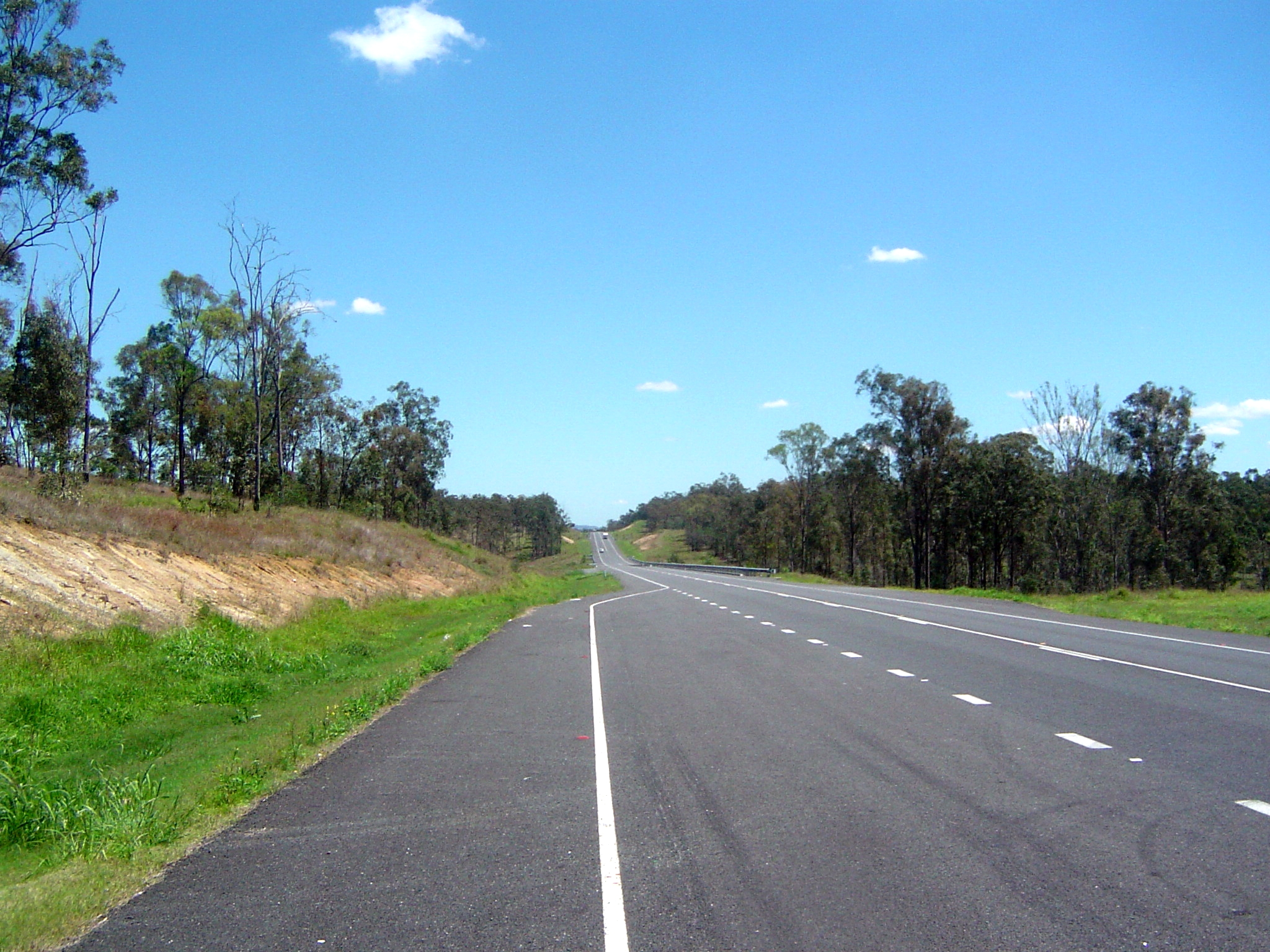
- Motorway extension near Ripley, Queensland

General information
- Type: Motorway
- Length: 43 km (27 mi)
- Route number(s): M5

Major junctions
- North end: Western Freeway; Kenmore
- Ipswich Motorway; Logan Motorway
- South end: Centenary Highway; Springfield

Location(s)
- Major suburbs / towns: Darra; Sinnamon Park

Highway system
- Highways in Australia; National Highway • Freeways in Australia; Highways in Queensland

The M5 (Centenary Motorway) is a 43-kilometre (27 mi) motorway in the western suburbs of Brisbane, Australia.

It starts at the terminus of the A5 Centenary Highway at Springfield, and ends at Kenmore where it changes its name to the M5 Western Freeway. It features eight interchanges, the major ones being with the M7 Ipswich Motorway (formerly Metroad 2 / M2) in Darra, the M2 Logan Motorway at Ellen Grove (formerly Metroad 4 / M4), and another at Sinnamon Park. It is the main route from Brisbane to Ipswich, Toowoomba, and Warwick.

In October 2012, it was announced that the planned bikeway from Springfield to the existing bikeway along the Motorway would not proceed. Instead the existing two lane road would be expanded by two lanes.

== History ==
Moggill Road to Darra: This section was opened as a two-lane arterial road in 1964. It included a new crossing of the Brisbane River, known as the Centenary Bridge. The first section to be duplicated was from the Western Freeway to a proposed Kenmore Bypass. This was completed in 1984, and included a grade separation at Fig Tree Pocket. The bypass was never built. The Centenary Bridge, and the highway from there to the Mount Ommaney Roundabout, was widened to four lanes in 1987. In 1989, twin bridges over the Mount Ommaney Roundabout, and 1.4km of duplication to the existing Sumners Road interchange was completed. In 1994, the final section from Sumners Road to Ipswich Road at Darra was duplicated. A roundabout interchange was constructed at the latter.

Darra to Springfield: In 1995, a two-lane link road was constructed between Boundary Road and Pine Road. It was later proposed to use this link road as part of an extension of the Centenary Highway to the new master-planned city of Springfield. The section from Pine Road to the Logan Motorway was opened by Minister for Main Roads Steve Bredhauer on 16 December 1998, and the section from the Logan Motorway to Springfield was opened by Premier Peter Beattie on 28 June 2000.

== Extension ==
A two lane extension of the highway to Yamanto was opened in late June 2009. The extension cost $366 million and was opened by Anna Bligh. Five bridges along the new section were named after local people, places, events and football teams, including botanist Lloyd Bird and the Box Flat Mine disaster. Since this new section contains three roundabouts, it is not motorway standard, and is instead designated as the A5 Centenary Highway.

== Upgrades ==
=== Duplicate Centenary Bridge ===
A project to duplicate the Centenary Bridge commenced construction on 20 April 2023, with a current investment of $298.5 million.

== Interchanges ==
The interchange with the Logan Motorway is crossed by a viaduct for the two track railway crossing of the Springfield railway line. The crossing is more than 800 metres long and has been designed so that its piers do not obstruct planned upgrades of both roads.

LGA	Location	km	mi	Destinations	Notes
Brisbane	Indooroopilly	0	0.0	Western Freeway (M5) north–east / Moggill Road (State Route 33) north–west – Brisbane, Kenmore, Indooroopilly	Northern motorway terminus: continues as Western Freeway; northbound exit only to Moggill Road
Brisbane	Indooroopilly–Fig Tree Pocket–Chapel Hill–Kenmore quadripoint	2	1.2	Fig Tree Pocket Road – Fig Tree Pocket	Parclo interchange
Brisbane River		4	2.5	Centenary Bridge	
Brisbane	Jindalee	4.5	2.8	Sinnamon Road	Northbound entrance and southbound exit
Brisbane	Jindalee	4.7– 5	2.9– 3.1	Seventeen Mile Rocks Road	No northbound entrance
Brisbane	Mount Ommaney–Sinnamon Park boundary	6	3.7	Dandenong Road west / Glen Ross Road east	Roundabout interchange
Brisbane	Jamboree Heights–Sumner–Darra tripoint	7	4.3	Sumners Road	
Brisbane	Darra	8	5.0	Ipswich Motorway (M7) – Oxley, Brisbane, Ipswich, Toowoomba	No northbound exit to M7 westbound; no southbound entrance from M7 eastbound
Brisbane	Richlands	9.5	5.9	Garden Road (State Route 30) – Richlands, Forest Lake	Southbound exit and northbound entrance
Brisbane	Richlands	10	6.2	Progress Road (State Route 30) – Wacol, Woodridge	Northbound exit and southbound entrance
Brisbane	Forest Lake	13	8.1	Logan Motorway (M2) – Ipswich, Gold Coast, Logan Central	No southbound exit to M2 north–westbound; no northbound entrance from M2 south–eastbound
Ipswich	Springfield–Springfield Lakes boundary	20	12	Springfield Parkway west / Springfield Lakes Boulevard east	
Ipswich	Springfield Lakes	21	13	Springfield–Greenbank Arterial – Greenbank, Springfield Central	Southbound exit only
Ipswich	Springfield Central–Augustine Heights boundary	22	14	Centenary Highway (A5) west / Augusta Parkway north / Sinnathamby Boulevard south – Warwick, Redbank Plains, Springfield Central	Southern motorway terminus: continues as Centenary Highway
Incomplete access

== See also ==
- Freeways in Australia
- Freeways in Brisbane
