= South East Queensland Regional Plan =

Australian regional growth plan

Coordinates: 27°39′49″S 152°57′05″E

The South East Queensland Regional Plan 2009-2031 (SEQRP 2009) is a statutory plan designed to guide regional growth and development in South East Queensland, Australia. It was established under the Integrated Planning Act 1997, which has now been replaced by The Sustainable Planning Act 2009.

The population of South East Queensland (SEQ) is expected to grow from 2.8 million in 2006 to 4.4 million people by 2031. The plan aims to manage this growth and protect the region's lifestyle and natural environment. It responds to regional issues such as: continued high population growth; traffic congestion; koala protection; housing affordability; climate change; employment generation; and infrastructure provision. The plan balances population growth with the need to protect the lifestyle South East Queensland residents value and enjoy.

A draft of the plan was released by the regional planning Minister on 7 December 2008 and it was open for public consultation until 1 May 2009. The final approved plan was released on 28 July 2009. The plan and its State Planning Regulatory Provisions are administered by the Department of Infrastructure, Local Government and Planning. The South East Queensland Regional Plan is currently being reviewed. A draft update to the plan was released in October 2016.

== History ==
The SEQRP 2009 is the outcome of a 20-year process of regional planning which started with the SEQ 2001 growth management project in 1990. SEQ 2001 was based on a collaborative, partnership approach between the Commonwealth, State and local governments and the regional community. It resulted in the preparation of the first, non-statutory regional plan for SEQ called the SEQ Regional Framework for Growth Management 1995. This plan was formally endorsed by all three levels of government.

In a report for ACELG (Australian Centre of Excellence for Local Government), Abbott (2012) has documented the 20 year evolution of metropolitan regional planning and collaborative governance in SEQ from a non-statutory to a statutory model by consensus processes. The South East Queensland Regional Plan 2005-2026, prepared by the Office of Urban Management, was the first statutory regional plan for SEQ. It was replaced by the current SEQRP 2009 in July 2009.

== Regional Policies and Land Use Patterns ==
The SEQRP 2009 is an integrated policy and statutory plan. It sets out desired regional outcomes, principles and policies for 12 policy areas, as follows:

1. Sustainability and climate change
2. Natural environment
3. Regional landscape
4. Natural resources
5. Rural futures
6. Strong communities
7. Engaging Aboriginal and Torres Strait Islander peoples
8. Compact settlement
9. Employment location
10. Infrastructure
11. Water management
12. Integrated transport

The plan allocates all land in the SEQ region into one of three regional land use categories, as follows:

- The Regional Landscape & Rural Production Area - identifies land with landscape, environmental, rural production or other non-urban values and protects these areas from inappropriate urban and rural residential development.
- The Urban Footprint - identifies the land necessary for urban expansion and development up to the year 2031 and covers existing and greenfield areas.
- The Rural Living Area - identifies areas designated for rural residential development under local government planning schemes and where further such development is permitted.

These areas are spatially defined by lot boundaries (cadastre) on regulatory maps at 1:50,000 scale.

The SEQRP 2009 does not permit urban development outside of the Urban Footprint. This represents about 85% of the region, including areas in Redland City set aside for koala habitat. According to the plan, 50% of new dwellings in SEQ will be accommodated by infill and redevelopment in existing urban areas. Infill dwelling targets are identified for each local government area and these have to be planned for in local planning schemes. Higher density and mixed-use development will be focussed around regional activity centres and high-frequency transit corridors, such as the Brisbane CBD, Ipswich, Maroochydore, Southport and Chermside.

== See also ==
- Australian property market
- South East Queensland Infrastructure Plan and Program
