= Springfield Central, Queensland =

Springfield Central
- Suburb
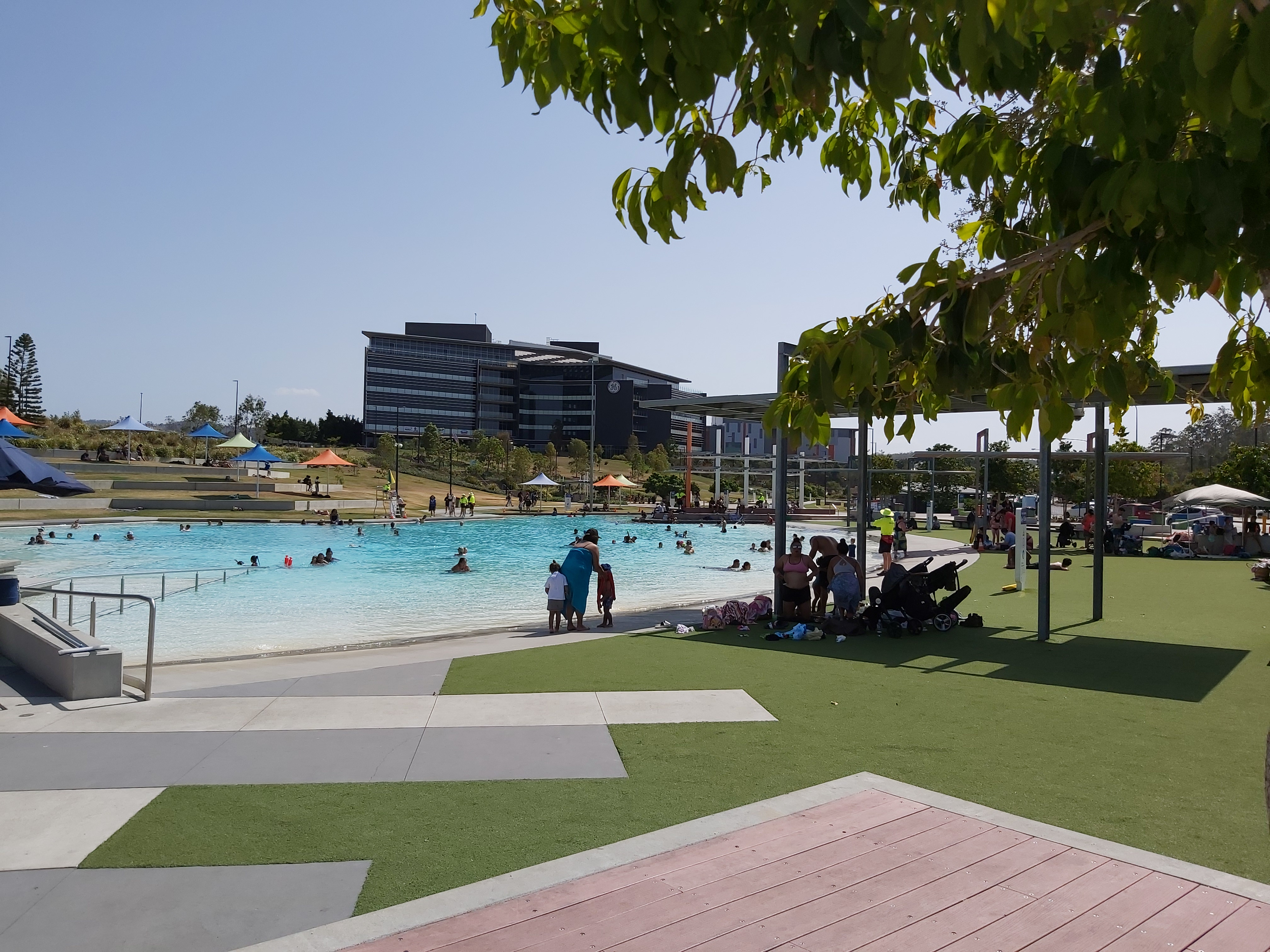
- Orion Lagoon pool

- Coordinates: 27.6855°S 152.9041°E
- Country: Australia
- State: Queensland
- LGA: City of Ipswich
- Location: 21 km (13 mi) ESE of Ipswich CBD; 33.8 km (21.0 mi) SW of Brisbane CBD; 13 km (8.1 mi) E of Ripley

Government
  - State electorate: Jordan
  - Federal division: Blair

Area
  - Total: 4.0 km^{2} (1.5 sq mi)

Population
  - Total: 234 (2021 census)
  - Density: 58.5/km^{2} (151.5/sq mi)
- Time zone: UTC+10:00 (AEST)
- Postcode: 4300
Suburbs around Springfield Central
Augustine Heights	Brookwater	Springfield
Spring Mountain	Springfield Central	Springfield Lakes
Spring Mountain	Spring Mountain	Springfield Lakes

Springfield Central is a suburb in the City of Ipswich, Queensland, Australia. In the 2021 census, Springfield Central had a population of 234 people. It is the designated business district of Greater Springfield.

== Geography ==
The Centenary Highway forms the northern boundary of the suburb. Despite its name, the Springfield Central railway station is immediately to the north of the highway and hence in the neighbouring suburb of Brookwater. The Robelle Domain is a 487 hectares (1,200 acres) parkland in the northern half of Springfield Central incorporating artificial lakes and waterways, landscaped gardens and cycle and pedestrian paths.

== History ==
Springfield Central State School and Springfield Central State High School both opened on 1 January 2011.

== Demographics ==
In the 2011 census, Springfield Central had a population of 105 people.

In the 2016 census, Springfield Central had a population of 114 people.

In the 2021 census, Springfield Central had a population of 234 people.

== Central business district ==
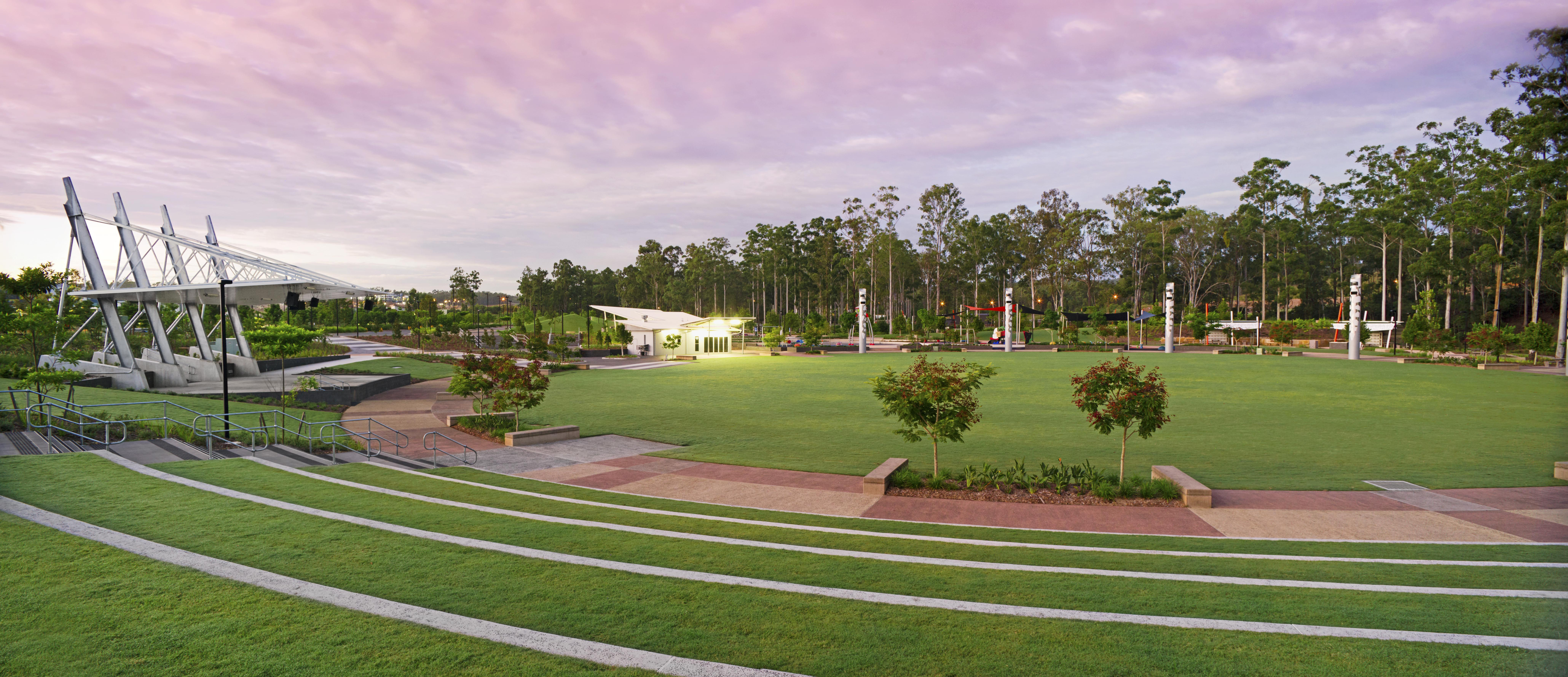
Robelle Domain Springfield Central Parklands

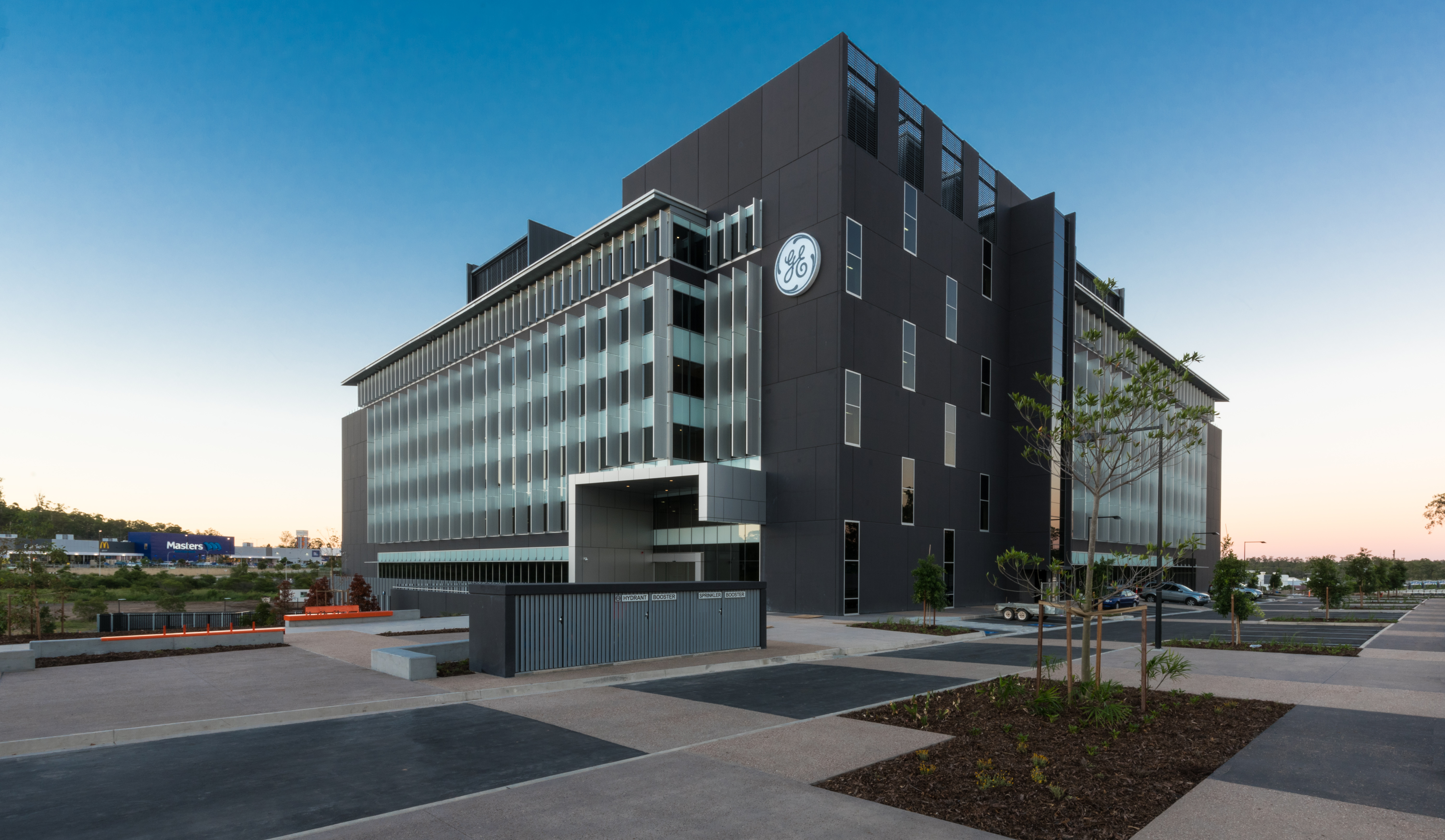
GE Australia Queensland headquarters, constructed early 2014.

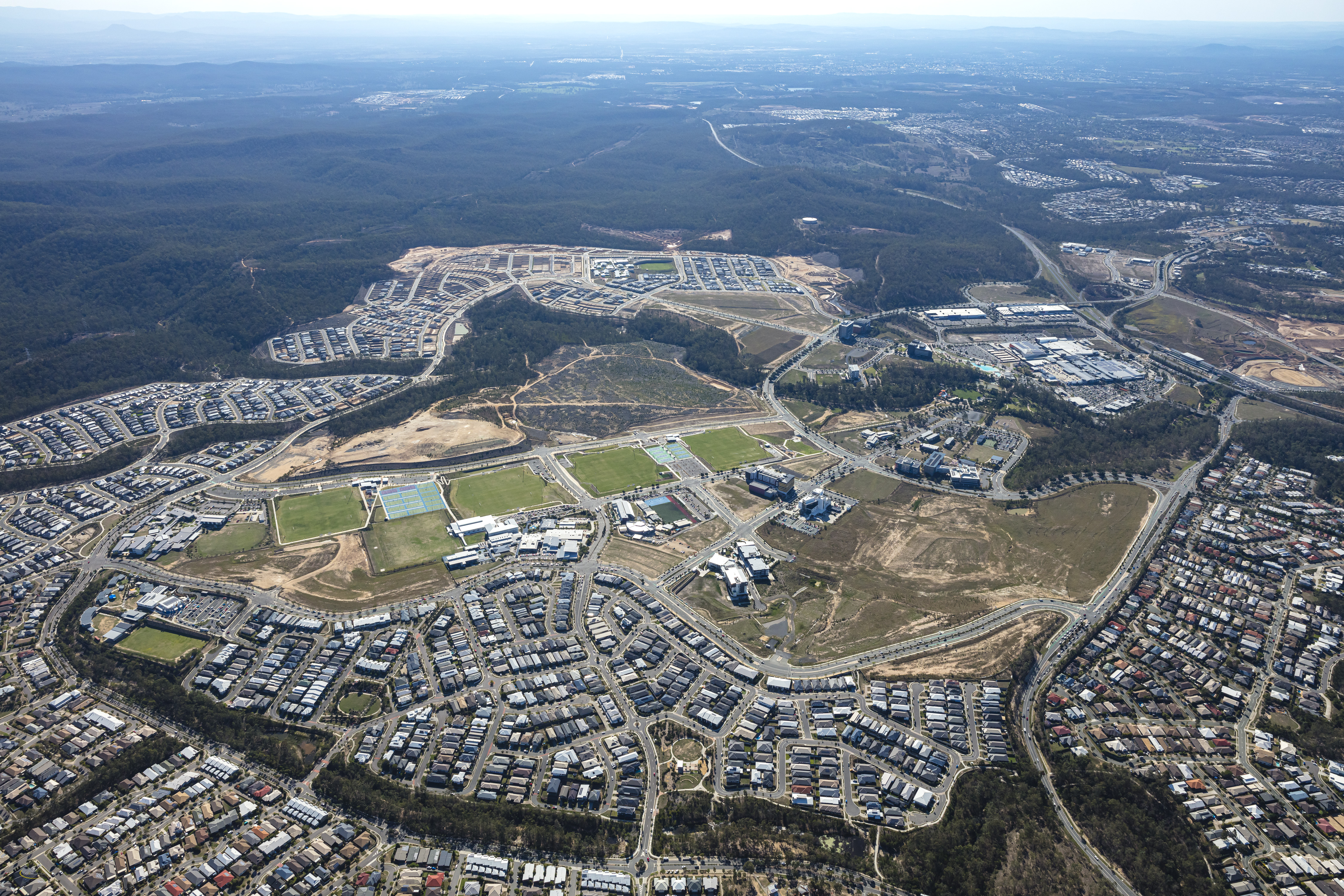
Springfield Central from the air, October 2019

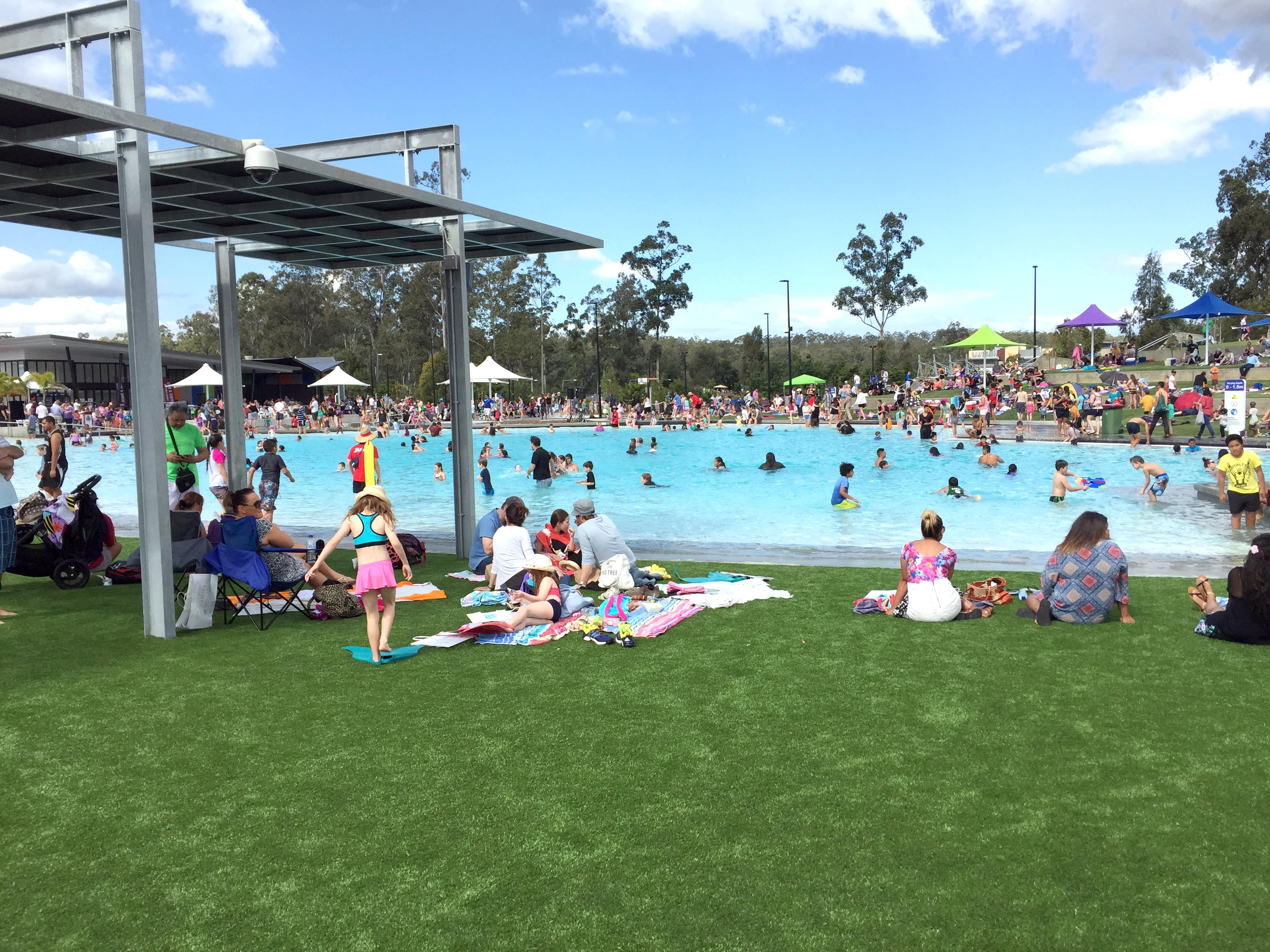
Robelle Domain's Orion Lagoon in Springfield Central

The suburb is the commercial, retail, educational, health and infrastructure hub of the Greater Springfield Development. It contains the Orion Springfield Central shopping centre which is home to almost 200 retailers, the Springfield Central railway station, office buildings, a large city parkland called Robelle Domain and water playground called Orion Lagoon, and the Mater Private Hospital Springfield.

Springfield Central is also home to various education and training institutions including a campus of the University of Southern Queensland and TAFE Queensland, the Union Institute of Language, Peter McMahon's Swim Factory, several private secondary institutions including St Peters Lutheran College Springfield and numerous public schools including Springfield Central State School and Springfield Central State High School, both of which were established in 2011.

Robelle Domain covers 24 ha and includes boardwalks, walking and cycle tracks, sports fields, playgrounds, a children’s water park, stage and amphitheatre, swimming lagoon and cafes. The Mater Private Hospital will initially be able to support 80-beds and is designed to expand as demand increases.

Springfield Central also hosts numerous commercial retailers including Bunnings, BCF and Event Cinemas with a Timezone arcade set to open in 2020.

== Amenities ==
The Ipswich City Council previously operated a fortnightly mobile library service which visited Orion Springfield Central (opposite the lagoon). With the development of the Springfield Central Library, this has since been removed.

A new $44 million multi-storey car park project is in development adjacent to Springfield Central Station and is set to increase the commuter car park capacity to 1100.

Aveo Springfield opened its first two buildings in 2018 providing 86 living spaces for elderly residents. At completion, the community is expected to host more than 2500 living spaces. In 2019, the $56 million Springfield Central Sports Complex was opened to the public. The sporting precinct features sixteen netball courts, eight tennis courts, four multi-purpose sporting fields, canteen amenities and playground.

The Reserve, Springfield opened in 2022 and is the first purpose built women's sports field in Australia. The venue has a capacity of 10,000 with 600 grandstand seats and it used as the primary playing venue for the Brisbane Lions AFL Women’s and VFL reserves team matches.

In October 2019, the previous Springfield Central Tavern site was replaced by the Springfield Brewery, Bar & Kitchen, owned by Salisbury-based craft beer brewery Ballistic Beer Co.The craft micro-brewery also produces a European style pilsner, the Springfield Pilsner, named after their location.

== Education ==
Springfield Central State School is a government primary (Prep-6) school for boys and girls at 257 Grande Avenue (27.6970°S 152.9065°E). In 2017, the school had an enrolment of 769 students with 49 teachers (45 full-time equivalent) and 28 non-teaching staff (19 full-time equivalent).

Springfield Central State High School is a government secondary (7-12) school for boys and girls at 90 Parkland Drive (27.6911°S 152.9083°E). In 2017, the school had an enrolment of 1410 students with 101 teachers (97 full-time equivalent) and 45 non-teaching staff (36 full-time equivalent). It includes a special education program at 70 Parkland Drive (27.6911°S 152.9083°E).

The Springfield campus of St Peters Lutheran College is a private primary and secondary (Prep-12) school for boys and girls at 42 Wellness Way (27.6893°S 152.9077°E). In 2017, the school had an enrolment of 522 students with 39 teachers (37 full-time equivalent) and 23 non-teaching staff (13 full-time equivalent).
