= Park Ridge Transit =

Australian bus operator

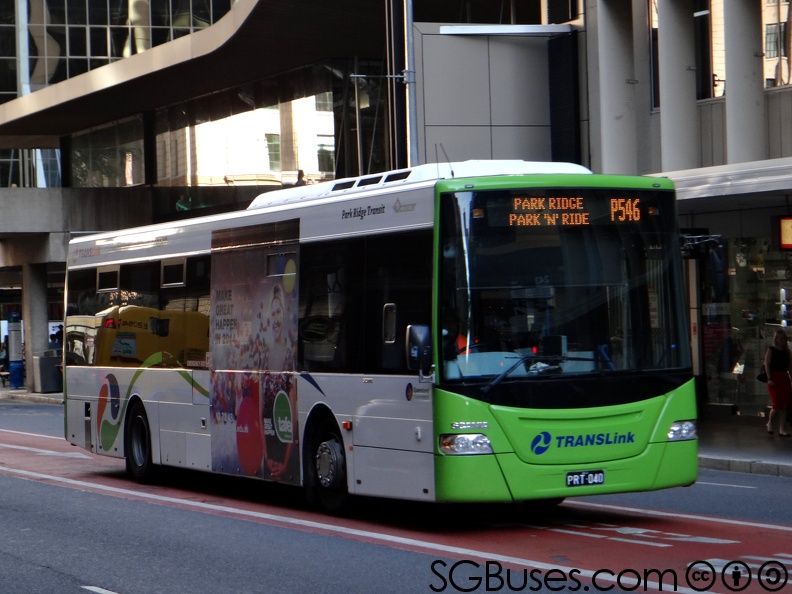
- Park Ridge Transit Gemilang Coachworks bodied Scania K230UB in January 2015
- Parent: Pulitano Group
- Service area: South Brisbane
- Service type: Bus operator
- Stations: Woodridge
- Depots: Park Ridge
- Fleet: 94 (Jun 2020)
- Website: www.busqld.com.au

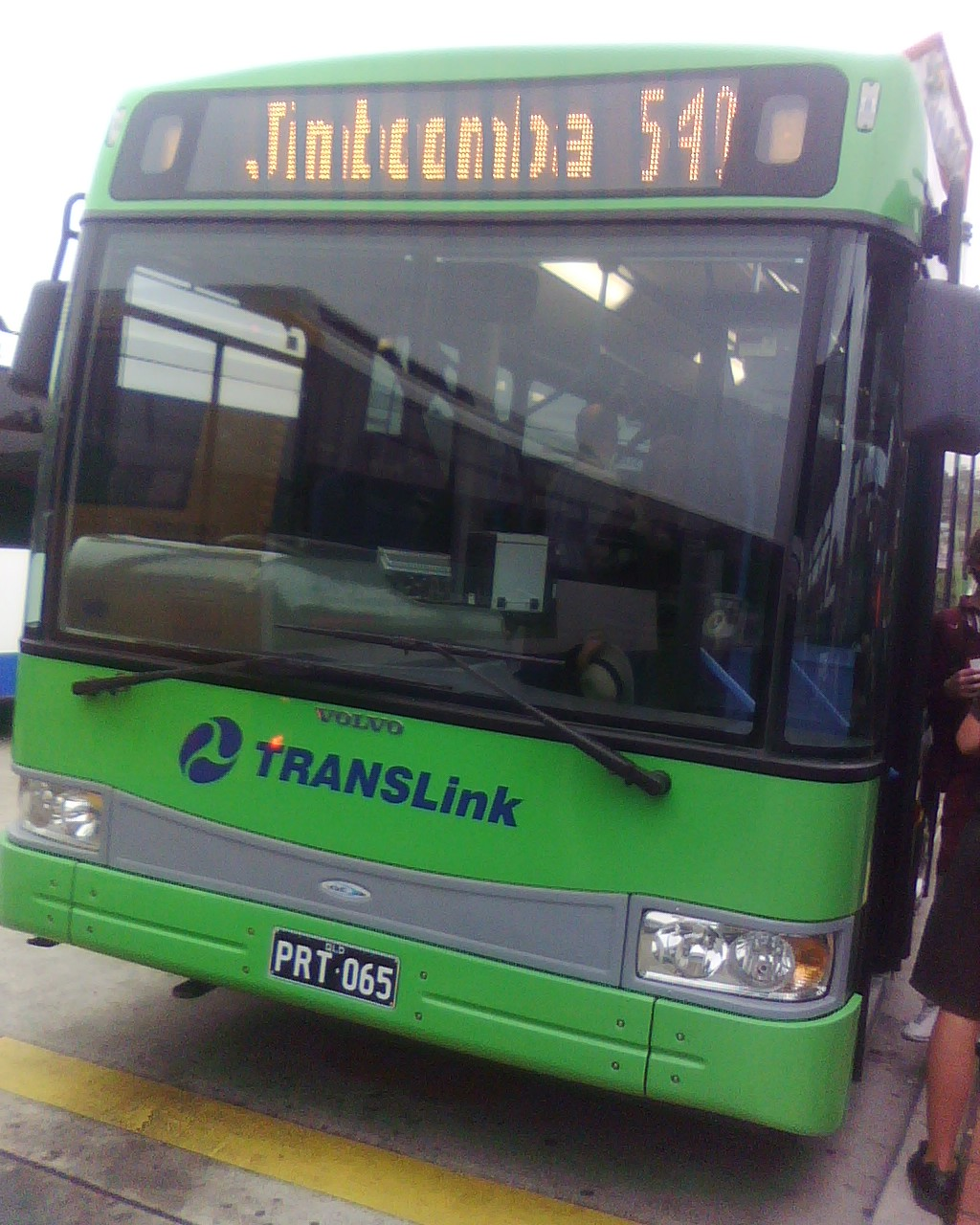
Bustech bodied Volvo B12BLE in August 2008

Park Ridge Transit is an Australian operator of bus services in the southern suburbs of Brisbane. It operates nine urban services and nearly 70 school runs under the contract of Translink, which is owned and operated by the Queensland Government.

== History ==
In 1988, Park Ridge Transit was purchased from Greyhound owners the Penfold family by the Pulitano Group. In 2008 the Woodhill Coaches was purchased and integrated into Park Ridge Transit.

== Routes ==
The company currently operates nine urban routes across Brisbane, Logan and Ipswich cities. They are:

Route	From	To	Via
534	Browns Plains	Springfield Orion	Forest Lake, Carole Park, Springfield Central station
535	Flagstone	Browns Plains	South Maclean, North Maclean
540	Beaudesert	Browns Plains	Gleneagle, Veresdale, Woodhill, Jimboomba, South Maclean, North Maclean, Park Ridge
541	Browns Plains	Greenbank	Boronia Heights
542	Browns Plains	Park Ridge	Heritage Park, Regents Park, Boronia Heights
543	Browns Plains	Heritage Park	Regents Park
545	Garden City	Browns Plains	Marsden, Kingston, Logan Central, Woodridge, Underwood, Eight Mile Plains
P546	Park Ridge	Brisbane City	Greenbank RSL, Griffith University station, Buranda station
547	Browns Plains	Woodridge	Drewvale, Berrinba

== Fleet ==
As at June 2020, the fleet consists of 94 buses.
