= Forestdale, Queensland =

Forestdale
- Suburb
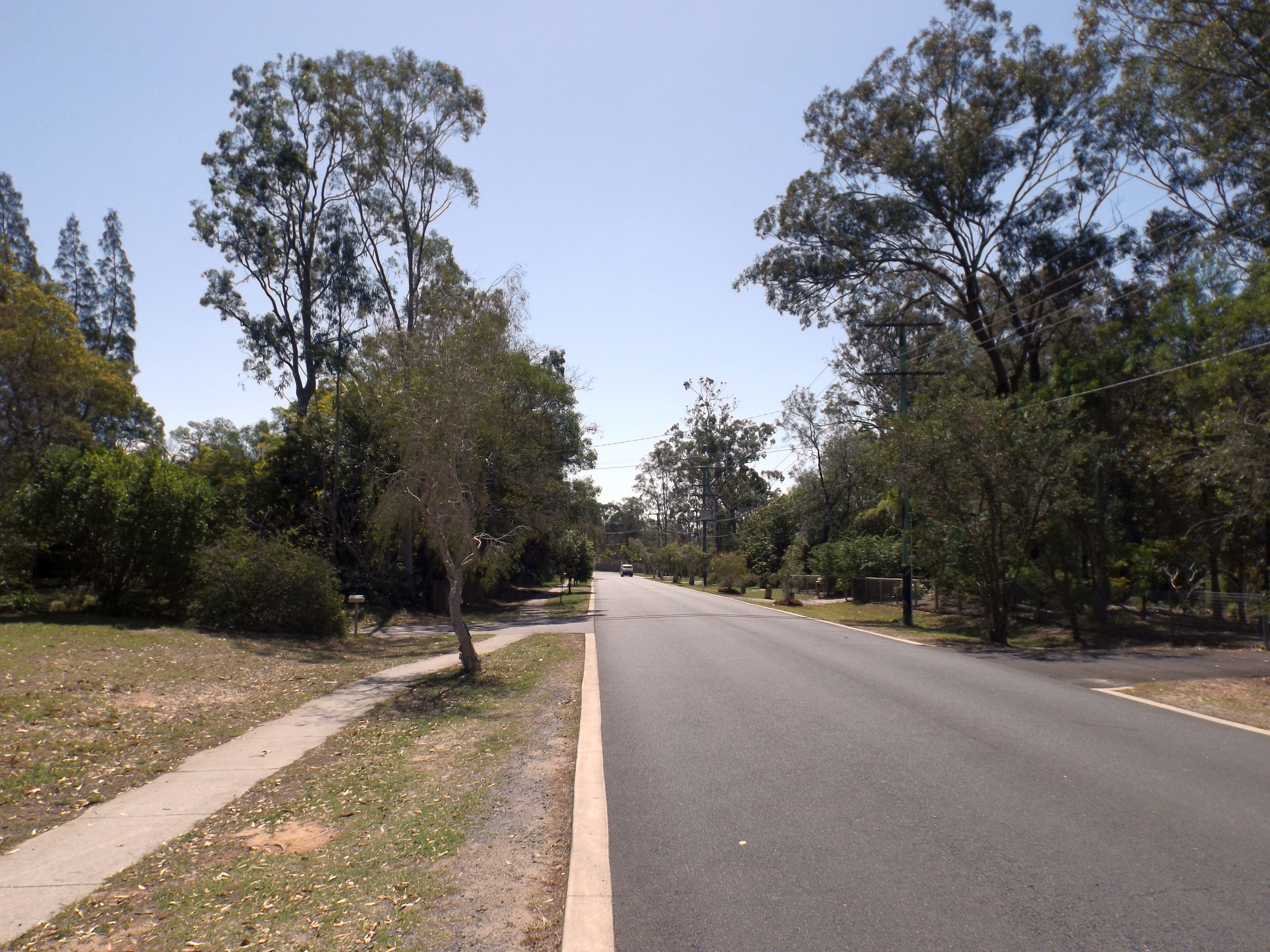
- Forestdale Drive, 2014

- Interactive map of Forestdale
- Coordinates: 27.6638°S 153.0016°E
- Country: Australia
- State: Queensland
- City: Logan City
- LGA: Logan City
- Location: 12.8 km (8.0 mi) W of Logan Central; 29.5 km (18.3 mi) S of Brisbane CBD

Government
  - State electorate: Algester
  - Federal division: Wright

Area
  - Total: 6.1 km^{2} (2.4 sq mi)

Population
  - Total: 2,560 (2021 census)
  - Density: 420/km^{2} (1,087/sq mi)
- Time zone: UTC+10:00 (AEST)
- Postcode: 4118
Suburbs around Forestdale
Heathwood	Larapinta	Parkinson
Greenbank	Forestdale	Hillcrest
Greenbank	Greenbank	Boronia Heights

Forestdale is a suburb of Logan City, Queensland, Australia. In the 2021 census, Forestdale had a population of 2,560 people.

== Geography ==
Forestdale is bounded to the east by the Brisbane-to-Sydney railway line and by Johnson Road to the north.

Oxley Creek flows through the suburb from the south-west (Greenbank) to the north (Heathwood/Larapinta).

"Forest" is from the modern day English word meaning a dense growth of trees and "dale" is originated from Middle English meaning a man who lived in the valley. The suffix is a reference to Robin Hood, an archer according to medieval folk tales. Many of the streets in the suburb are named after characters from Robin Hood stories.

The land use is suburban housing.

== History ==
The Brisbane–Sydney railway line was built in the 1880s.

Forestdale was once part of Browns Plains, but became as a separate suburb in 1987. In 1927, much of present-day Forestdale was owned by George Stretton, a farmer and publican after whom the suburb of Stretton was named.

No development had occurred until the 1946 when Paradise Road was created as rough dirt track. Farming began in the 1970s. A few roads with suburban development commenced in the 1970s, with most of the housing in the suburb constructed in the 1980s.

The name Forestdale was chosen by the developers. It has been used by the post office since 1981. The Logan City Council approved the name change in May 1986 and it was gazetted as an official place name in June 1987.

== Demographics ==
In the 2011 census, the population of Forestdale was 2,520, 48.6% female and 51.4% male. The median age of the Forestdale population was 39 years, 2 years above the national median of 37. 71.4% of people living in Forestdale were born in Australia. The other top responses for country of birth were England 6.3%, New Zealand 3.5%, Taiwan 1.9%, Vietnam 1.4%, South Africa 1.2%. 81.7% of people spoke only English at home; the next most common languages were 2.7% Mandarin, 2.3% Vietnamese, 1.4% Spanish, 1% Cantonese, 1% Greek.

In the 2016 census, Forestdale had a population of 2,531 people.

In the 2021 census, Forestdale had a population of 2,560 people.

== Education ==
There are no schools in Forestdale. The nearest government primary schools are in neighbouring Boronia Heights and nearby Regents Park and Browns Plains. The nearest government secondary schools are Forest Lake State High School (in Forest Lake), Stretton State College (in Stretton), Browns Plains State High School (in Browns Plains) and Park Ridge State High School (in Park Ridge).

== Greenwood Lakes ==
The Greenwood Lakes wetland with high conservation values is found in Forestdale. Visitors to the park may undertake bushwalking, walk the dog, bird watching and use the picnic tables, boardwalk and viewing platform provided. A large lake and terraced banks along Oxley Creek were created by commercial sand extraction operations in the area.
