= Springfield Anglican College =

The Springfield Anglican College

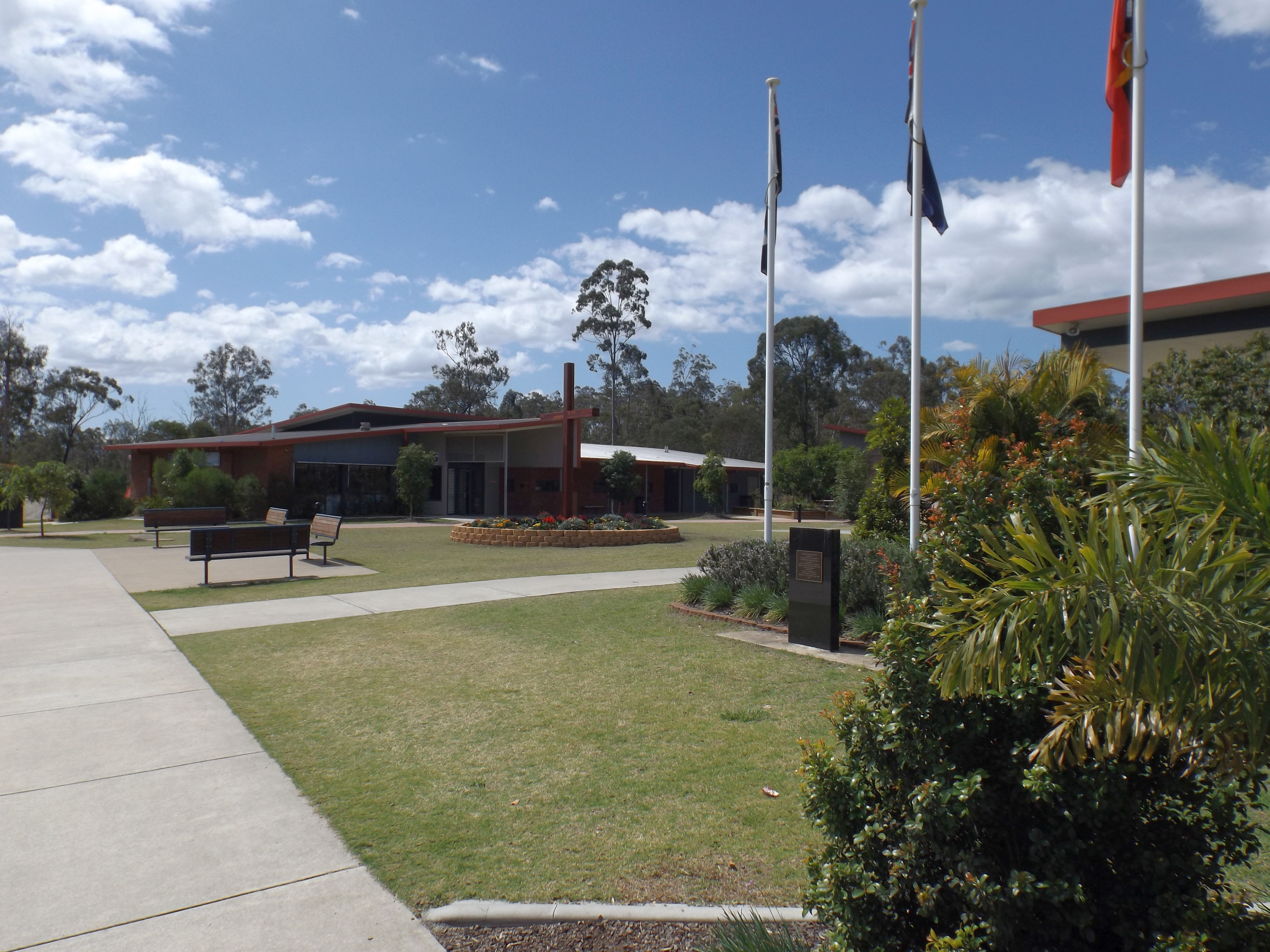
- War memorial, 2014

Location
- Springfield, Queensland; Australia; 27°40′14″S 152°54′28″E

Information
- Type: Independent co-educational early learning, primary and secondary day school
- Motto: Faith, Honour, Service
- Religious affiliations: Anglican Diocese of Brisbane; Anglican Schools Office; Former: Uniting Church in Australia
- Denomination: Anglican
- Established: 4 May 1998; 28 years ago (as The Springfield College)
- Principal: Steven Morris
- Head of Secondary: Richard Clark
- Head of Primary: Tania Brewer
- Chaplain: The Rev. Jonathan Kemp
- Years: K–12
- Enrolment: 1052 (2023)
- Campus: Primary: Springfield College Drive; Secondary: Springfield Greenbank Arterial
- Campus type: Regional
- Colours: Red, navy and white
- Newspaper: Threads
- Affiliation: The Associated Schools; Former: EDUCANG
- Website: www.tsac.qld.edu.au

The Springfield Anglican College (TSAC) is an independent Anglican co-educational early learning, primary and secondary day school, located in Springfield, a suburb of the City of Ipswich in South East Queensland, Australia.

The College comprises two campuses, the early learning centre and primary school from Kindergarten to Year 6, located on Springfield College Drive; and the secondary school from Year 7 to Year 12) on the Springfield – Greenbank Arterial. In 2024, the College has approximately 1100 students across both Campuses.

== History ==
TSC logo from 1998 to 2010

The Springfield Anglican College was established on 4 May 1998 as The Springfield College (TSC), with an enrolment of twelve students. Student numbers have grown quickly and it now has an estimated enrolment of over 1100 students, from Kindergarten to Year 12.

In 2007, enrolments outgrew facilities – a result of the delayed start of the new Middle/Senior School campus – and Senior School students (Years Ten to Twelve) were transferred to sister school Forest Lake College.

The college was originally a joint initiative of the Anglican Church of Australia and the Uniting Church in Australia and until 2009 was operated by EDUCANG along with Mary McConnel School, Forest Lake, The FLC International Centre and The Lakes College. In October 2009, sole ownership of Forest Lake College (FLC) and The Springfield College (TSC) was assumed by the Anglican Diocese of Brisbane and a new board was appointed to EDUCANG. The Uniting Church in Australia had previously taken sole ownership of The Lakes College at Mango Hill.

The College celebrated its 10th anniversary in 2008. In April, Stage 1 of the new Secondary Campus was completed and students in Years 6 to 10 relocated into the purpose-built campus. In 2010, the College returned to a Prep to Year 12 College, and Year 6 re-joining the Primary Campus following the renovation of new large classrooms.

On 4 November 2010, a new entity FSAC Ltd (Forest Lake and Springfield Anglican Colleges) took over the governances of the two colleges from EDUCANG and renamed the colleges – St John's Anglican College and The Springfield Anglican College. The new College name officially took effect on 1 January 2011.

The College celebrated its 25th year of educating young people in 2023.

== College Clans and Pastoral Care ==
The Springfield Anglican College's pastoral care program is based on the College Clan structure, of which there are four: Keith, McDuff, Robertson, and Sinclair, named in honour of some of Scotland's proudest and most historic families.

Clan Keith	Clan MacDuff	Clan Robertson	Clan Sinclair
Colour: green	Colour: red	Colour: navy blue	Colour: sky blue
Motto: Truth Conquers	Motto: God assists	Motto: Glory is rewarded by valour	Motto: Commit thy work to God
Badge: A Stag's head	Badge: A Lion rampant	Badge: A dextor hand holding a crown	Badge: A Rooster

Each Clan strives to foster an inclusive family ethos where each person feels valued and cared. Each Clan is overseen by a Head of Clan, who develops a deep understanding of each student in their care throughout their time at the College.

== Sport ==
=== The Greater Brisbane Conference ===
The Springfield Anglican College sporting program is centred on membership of Greater Brisbane Conference (GBC) for students in Years 7–12, and Junior GBC Competition (JGBC) for students in Years 3–7.

All GBC sport is played on Saturdays over three school terms. Each GBC season is approximately nine weeks.

	Boys	Girls	Carnival
Term 1	AFL; Volleyball	AFL; Basketball	Swimming
Term 2	Indoor Cricket Touch Football	Football (Soccer); Netball	Cross Country
Term 3	Basketball; Football (Soccer)	Touch Football Volleyball	Athletics

== See also ==
- List of schools in Queensland
- List of Anglican schools in Australia
