= Heathwood =

Heathwood may refer to:

- Heathwood, Queensland
- Heathwood Hall Episcopal School
