= Mary McConnel School =

Coordinates: 27°37′18″S 152°58′17″E

- Forest Lake, Queensland; Australia

Information
- Type: Independent, co-educational
- Established: 2003
- Principal: Pam Hall (Alpine Place Campus)
- Head of College: Steve Croft
- Chaplain: Rev. Michael Skinner (Uniting Church)
- Grades: Prep–12
- Campus: Urban (Forest Lake); Urban (Springfield)
- Colours: Red, navy blue and white
- Affiliation: Anglican Schools Office; Uniting Church in Australia; EDUCANG Limited
- Deputy Head of College: Neil Flottmann
- Chief Financial Officer: Joe McMeniman
- Website: www.marymcconnelschool.com.au

Mary McConnel School (MMS) is a joint initiative of the Anglican Church of Australia and the Uniting Church in Australia. It is operated by EDUCANG Limited, along with Forest Lake College, The FLC International Centre, The Lakes College and The Springfield College.

The Mary McConnel School provides an alternative educational program for students who, due to a high-support learning need, have difficulties accessing conventional education programs.

The school is named in honour of Mary McConnel who founded the Royal Children's Hospital in Brisbane in 1878.

The Head of the Mary McConnel School is based at the College Avenue Campus of Forest Lake College and also manages the Mary McConnel operations at the Alpine Place Campus of Forest Lake College and at The Springfield College.

== History ==
Mary McConnel School was established in 2003.

== Curriculum ==
The School provides: early intervention programs; educational therapy and emotional support for school-age children; and transition-to-work assistance, through the post-compulsory school program.

Students in Preparatory to Year Nine focus on literacy and numeracy for their individual programs, whilst programs for students in Senior Schooling (Years Ten to Twelve) take on a vocational education focus.

At the end of Year 12, students are able to undertake a 12-month habilitation program, to provide them with the life skills needed to live independently in society.

== Sport ==
=== The Associated Schools Sports ===
Mary McConnel School's sporting program is centred on the host College's membership of The Associated Schools (TAS) for students in Years 8–12, and Junior TAS Competition (JTAS) for students in Years 4–7.

Apart from the core sports of Swimming, Cross-country and Athletics, all TAS sport is played on Saturdays over 3 trimesters. Each trimester is approximately nine weeks.

	Boys	Girls	Carnival
Trimester 1	Cricket; Volleyball	Basketball; Tennis	Swimming
Trimester 2	Rugby; Tennis	Hockey; Netball	Cross Country
Trimester 3	Basketball; Soccer	Volleyball; Softball	Athletics
