= Hillcrest, Queensland =

Hillcrest
- Suburb
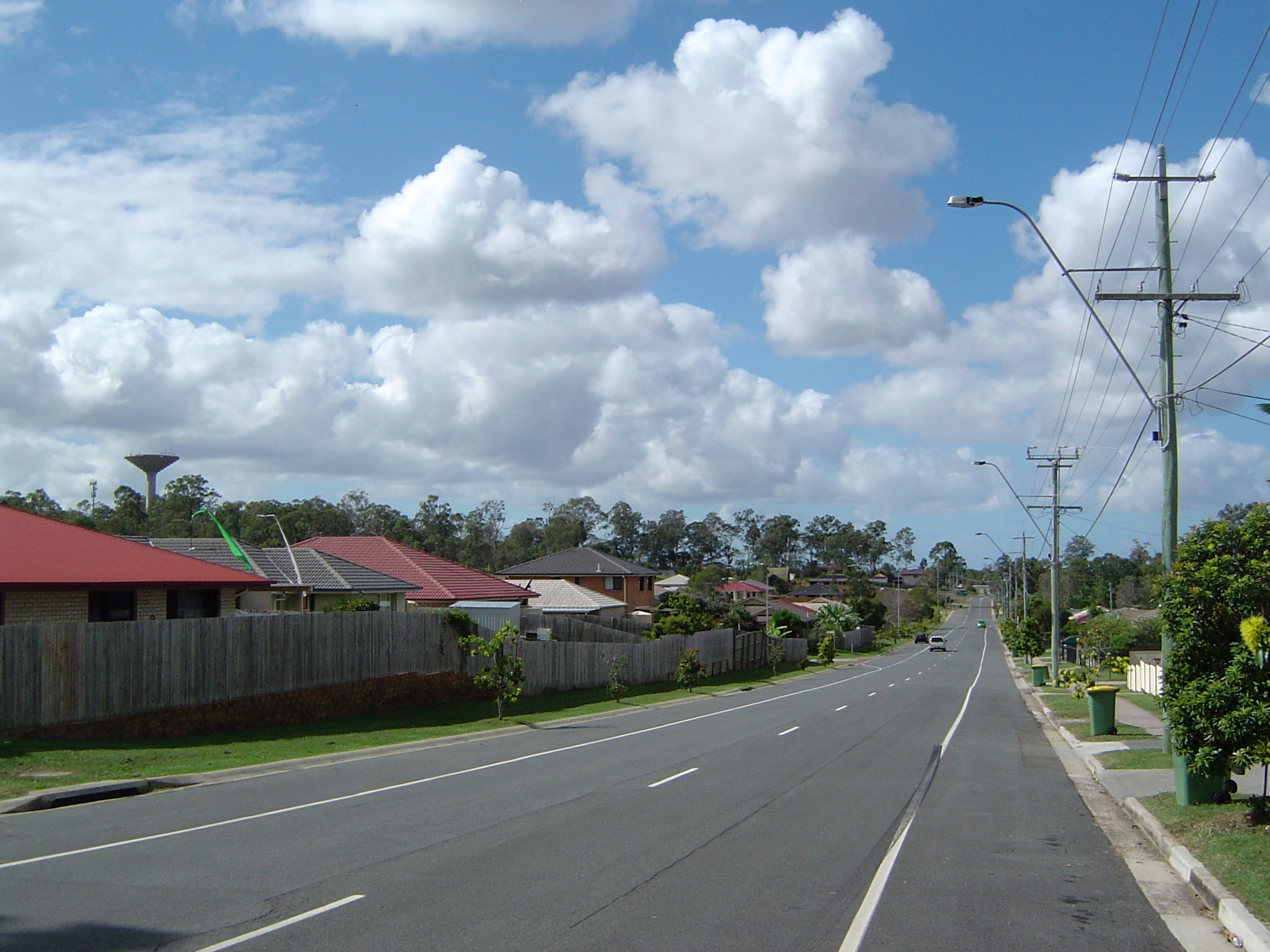
- Coronation Road, 2014

- Interactive map of Hillcrest
- Coordinates: 27.6688°S 153.0274°E
- Country: Australia
- State: Queensland
- City: Logan City
- LGA: Logan City
- Location: 10.3 km (6.4 mi) WSW of Logan Central; 25.9 km (16.1 mi) S of Brisbane CBD

Government
  - State electorate: Algester
  - Federal division: Rankin

Area
  - Total: 3.2 km^{2} (1.2 sq mi)

Population
  - Total: 6,268 (2021 census)
  - Density: 1,959/km^{2} (5,070/sq mi)
- Time zone: UTC+10:00 (AEST)
- Postcode: 4118
Suburbs around Hillcrest
Larapinta	Parkinson	Browns Plains
Forestdale	Hillcrest	Regents Park
Greenbank	Boronia Heights	Regents Park

Hillcrest is a western suburb in the City of Logan, Queensland, Australia. In the 2021 census, Hillcrest had a population of 6,268 people.

== Geography ==
Hillcrest lies to the west of Browns Plains. It is bounded by Johnson Road, Mount Lindesay Highway, the interstate railway and Coronation Road to the south.

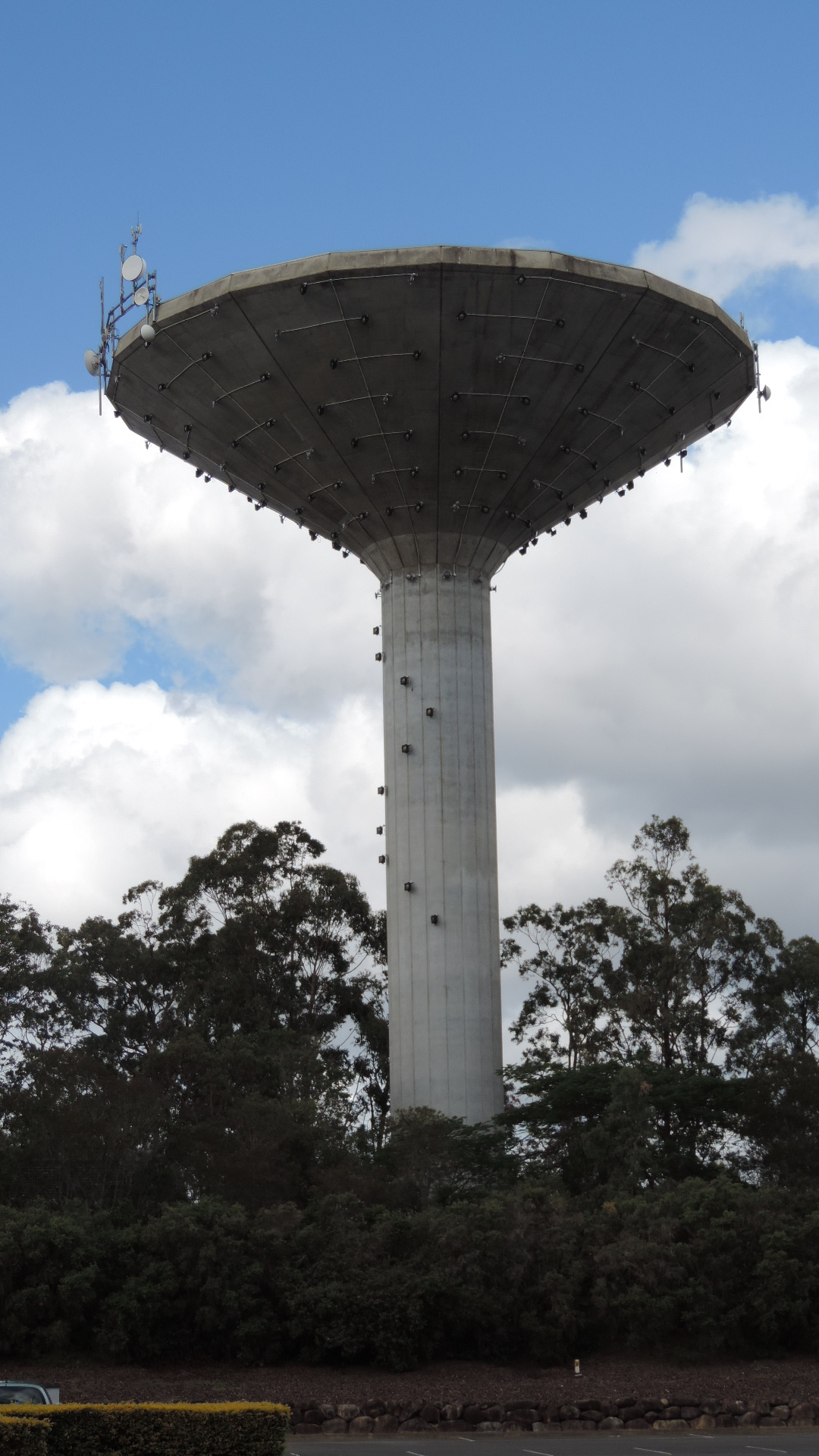
Wineglass Water Tower, Hillcrest, 2014

As the name suggests, part of the suburb is on the crest of a hill. The Wineglass Water Tower (named for its shape) on the top of the hill is visible for many kilometres; it is illuminated at night. The water tower holds 1 million litres of water and weighs 400 tonnes.

== History ==
The wineglass water tower was completed in June 1984.

Hillcrest was originally part of Browns Plains and was gazetted as a separate place name in June 1987.

== Demographics ==
In the 2011 census, Hillcrest had a population of 5,229 people, 50.4% female and 49.6% male. The median age of the Hillcrest population was 31 years, 6 years below the national median of 37. 68.6% of people living in Hillcrest were born in Australia. The other top responses for country of birth were New Zealand 9.1%, England 3.7%, Philippines 1.5%, Fiji 0.9%, South Africa 0.7%. 82.9% of people spoke only English at home; the next most common languages were 1.2% Samoan, 0.9% Hindi, 0.9% Vietnamese, 0.9% Spanish, 0.7% Mandarin.

In the 2016 census, Hillcrest had a population of 5,626 people.

In the 2021 census, Hillcrest had a population of 6,268 people.

== Education ==
There are no schools in Hillcrest. The nearest government primary schools are Boronia Heights State School in neighbouring Boronia Heights to the south, Regents Park State School in neighbouring Regents Park to the east, and Browns Plains State School in neighbouring Browns Plains to the north-east. The nearest government secondary schools are Park Ridge State High School in Park Ridge to the south-east and Browns Plains State High School in neighbouring Browns Plains.

== Facilities ==
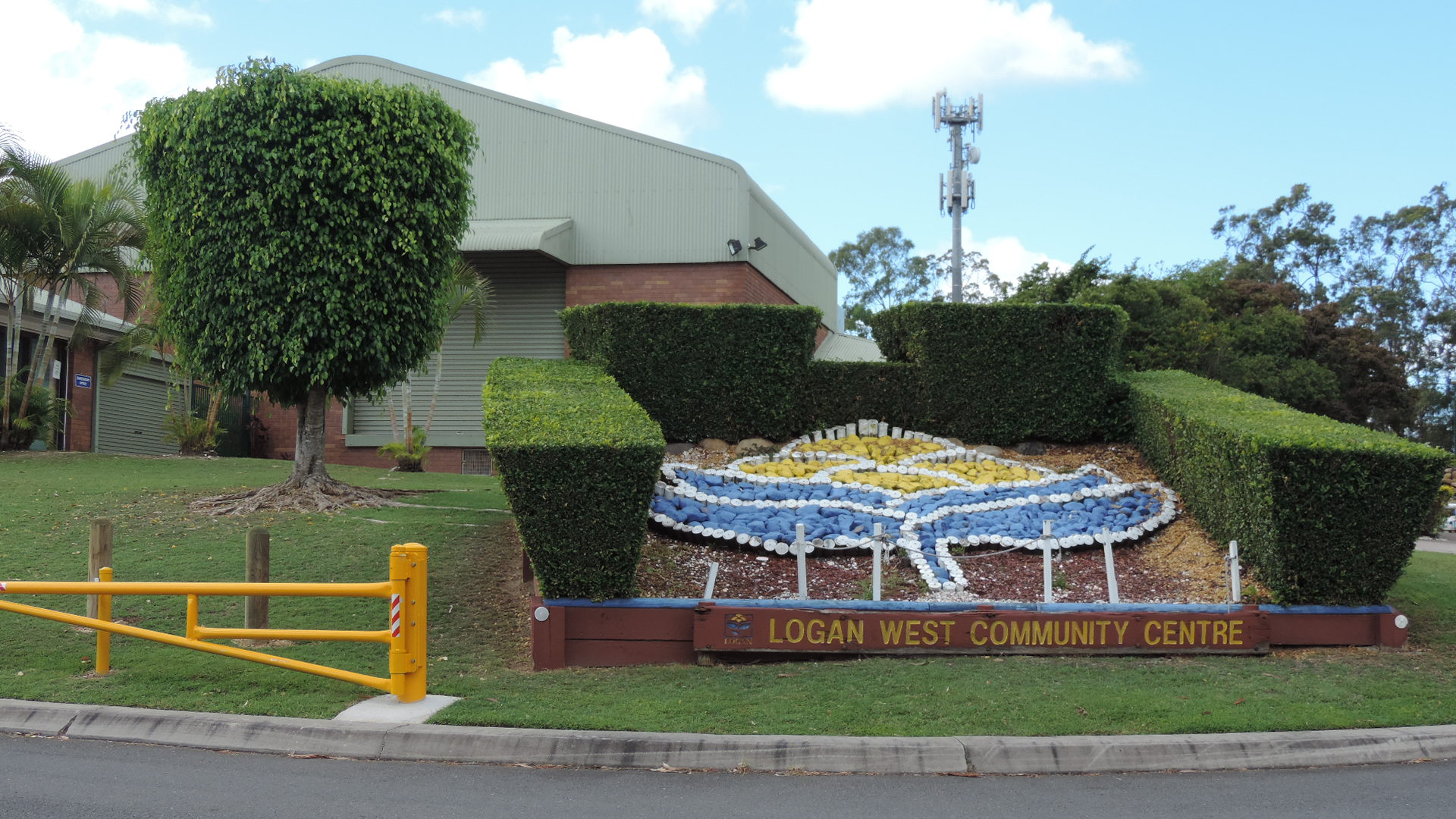
Logan West community centre, Hillcrest, 2014

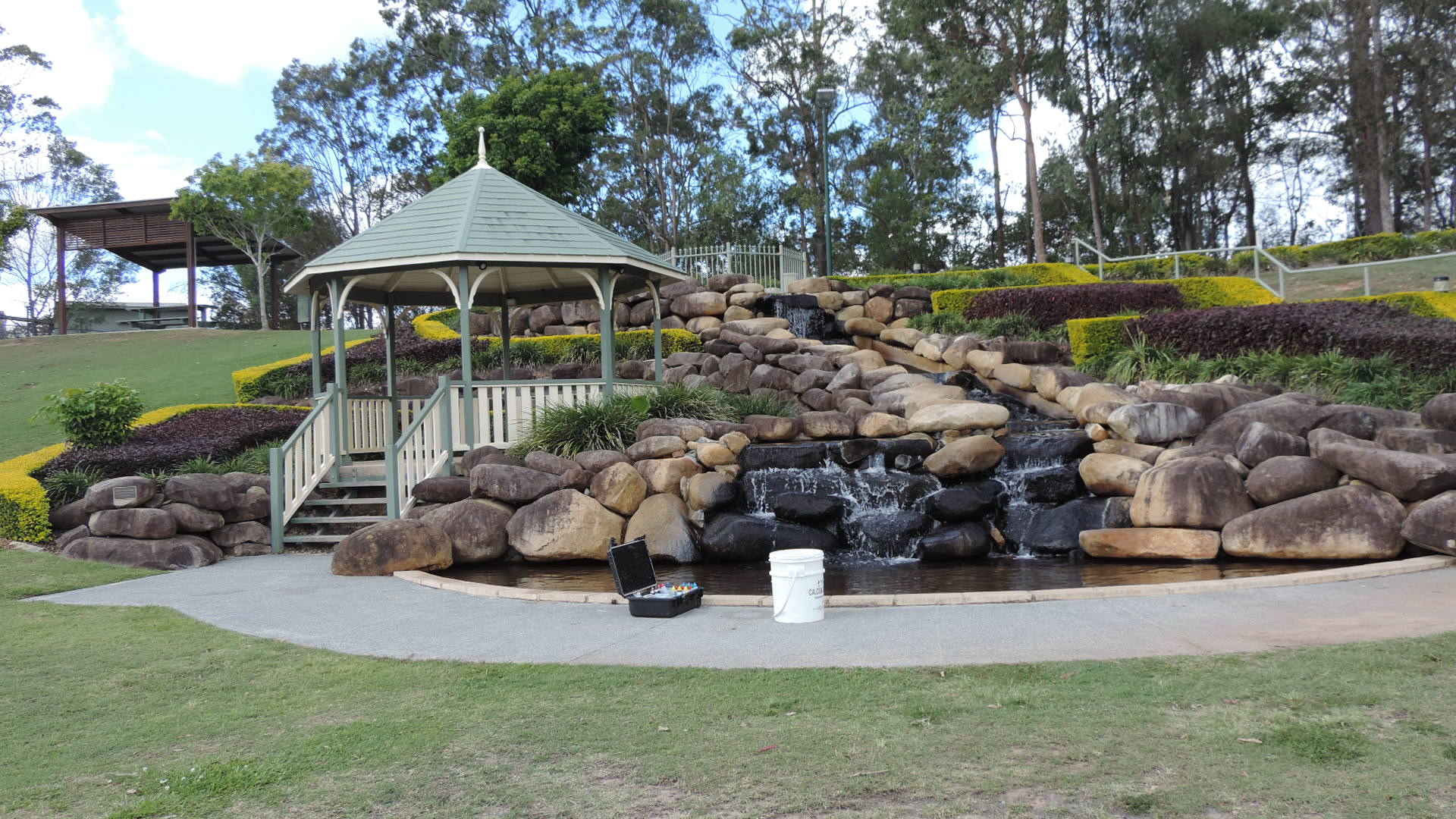
Rotunda and water garden, Logan West Community Centre, Hillcrest, 2014

The Park Ridge Ambulance Station was officially opened in May 1982 and was located under the wineglass water tower. It employed three officers and had two ambulance vehicles. The Calam Lions Club donated an ambulance vehicle to the service. A temporary fire station was also located here between 1983 and 1986 when a permanent station known as Logan West was built in Orr Court.

The Browns Plains police station was built in 1988 at Orr Court (27.67786°S 153.02951°E). It was a twenty-four-hour station with twelve officers and five detectives at that time. A shop front police office was opened in Grand Plaza in August 2000 and, in June 2002, a $750,000 refurbishment of the police station included the provision of a Juvenile Aid Bureau, a secure holding cell, electronic interview room and finger printing facilities.

== Amenities ==
The Logan West Community Centre is located at 2 Wineglass Drive (27.67499°S 153.02902°E) and has a hall with a capacity of 410 people (conference style) and 300 people (banquet style). It began with the relocation of a house from Jacaranda Avenue Woodridge in October 1982. The house had been used as the headquarters of the Logan and Albert Library Board and then the Burragah Aboriginal Centre. A new community centre was built in 1988. The rotunda and water gardens are suitable for weddings and photography sessions.

Brisbane Taiwanese Uniting Church is at 1 Wineglass Drive (27.6755°S 153.0282°E). It is part of the Moreton Rivers Presbytery of the Uniting Church in Australia.
