= St John's Anglican College, Brisbane =

St John's Anglican College

Location
- Forest Lake, Brisbane, Queensland; Australia; 27°37′19″S 152°58′19″E

Information
- Former name: Forest Lake College
- Type: Independent co-educational primary and secondary day school
- Motto: Faith, Service, Courage
- Religious affiliation: Anglican Diocese of Brisbane
- Denomination: Anglican
- Established: 1994; 32 years ago
- Principal: Maria Mclvor
- Chaplain: Rev. Juliana Bate
- Years: Prep–12
- Enrolment: 1,100
- Campuses: Junior: Alpine Place, Forest Lake; Secondary: College Avenue, Forest Lake
- Affiliation: The Associated Schools
- Website: stjohnsanglicancollege.com.au

St John's Anglican College is an independent Anglican co-educational primary and secondary day school located in the southwestern Brisbane suburb of Forest Lake, Queensland, Australia. The College was established in 1994 and caters for students from Prep to Year 12.

== History ==
The college was previously called Forest Lake College and adopted its present name in 2011. It opened in 1994 with 66 students and now has over 1,200.

It was originally a joint initiative of the Anglican Church of Australia and the Uniting Church of Australia and until 2009 was operated by EDUCANG Limited along with Mary McConnel School, The FLC International Center, The Lakes College and The Springfield College.

In October 2009, sole ownership of Forest Lake College and Springfield Anglican College was assumed by the Anglican Diocese of Brisbane and a new board was appointed to EDUCANG.

== Curriculum ==
St John's Anglican College curriculum includes individualised training in the academic, cultural, social, spiritual and physical domains. St John's Anglican College academic curriculum offers a range of science, humanities and vocational subjects. St John's Anglican College believes there are three discrete stages of a child's education

1. the middle years of development and growth, and
2. the final years of preparation for adult life.

The College structure reflects these stages of individual development, rather than the traditional Primary and Secondary schooling distinction.

=== Language ===
Mandarin Chinese and Spanish are the Language Other Than English (LOTE) available at the college. Chinese is taught in classes from Prep (pre-school) through to Year 8 and may be undertaken as an elective subject from Year 9 through to Year 12. Spanish is taught as an elective subject from Year 7 to Year 8.

=== Performing Arts ===
Students from Prep (pre-school) onwards learn to play an orchestral musical instrument. As part of the core curriculum, all students receive instruction from String, Brass, Percussion or Woodwind specialist music teachers during allotted classroom time. Students in Prep and Years One, Two, Three and Four receive instruction in the violin. From Year Five, students may elect to continue with the violin, or they may prefer to choose other string, woodwind, brass or percussion instruments. Students will be guided in their choice by the College Instrumental Music Instructors. In the secondary campus, Music and Drama are offered as elective subjects from Year 9 and are compulsory in Years 7 and 8. The school supports various groups based around these areas, including Dance troupes and orchestras. The College has also been hosting musical productions biennially since 1999, with the latest production in 2025 "Mary Poppins".

=== Future Thinkers program ===
The College offers the 'Future Thinkers' program for Year 9 and 10 students. Students in this program attend local, national and international competitions and in 2015 to 2019 the school participated in the Conrad Spirit of Innovation Challenge.

=== Other activities ===
The College offers activities in cultural areas, as well as recreational and leisure activities such as public speaking, digi (digital) clubs and chess clubs. Students take part in debating competitions with other schools, fielding teams in the Queensland Debating Union schools' competition.

== Sports ==
TAS (The Associated Schools) Sports The St John's Anglican College sporting program is centred on membership of:

- The Associated Schools (TAS) for students in Years 7–12, and
- Junior TAS Competition (JTAS) for students in Years 4–6, the premier co-educational sporting associations of South East Queensland.

The College participates in TAS & JTAS Saturday Sporting fixtures over 3 trimesters. Each trimester is approximately nine weeks. The College also participates in Interschool Carnivals in Swimming, Cross-country and Athletics.

== Houses ==
St John's Anglican College has a house system which consists of four houses. They are Archerfield (formally Hollingworth, named after Peter Hollingworth), Bow Qing Tian, Braithwaite and Delbeta. Their house colours are navy blue, sky blue, red and green respectively.

== Notable alumni ==
- Ashleigh Brewer (born 1990), actress (Neighbours, The Bold and the Beautiful).

== See also ==
- List of schools in Queensland
- List of Anglican schools in Australia
