= Browns Plains bus station =

Bus station in Brisbane, Australia

Browns Plains

General information
- Location: Grand Plaza Drive, Browns Plains
- Coordinates: 27°39′41.81″S 153°02′31.36″E
- Platforms: 2 island platforms, 1 side platform 6 stops

Construction
- Parking: Kiss 'n' Ride
- Accessible: yes

Other information
- Fare zone: 2/3
Location

Browns Plains is a bus station operated by Translink. It opened in 1994 and is located at the Grand Plaza Shopping Centre in the Logan suburb of Browns Plains. It is a ground level station, featuring one island platform with two faces and one side platform.

In 2014, the bus station underwent a two-stage upgrade.

== Platforms and services ==
Browns Plains platform arrangement
Platform	Stop	Direction	Routes	Notes
1	1A	Drop off only		
1	1B	East	550, 560	
2	2A	North, East, South, West	534, 535, 545, 547	
2	2B	East, South	540, 541, 542, 543	
3	3A	Inbound	140	
3	3B	Inbound	150	
