= Heathwood, Queensland =

Heathwood
- Suburb
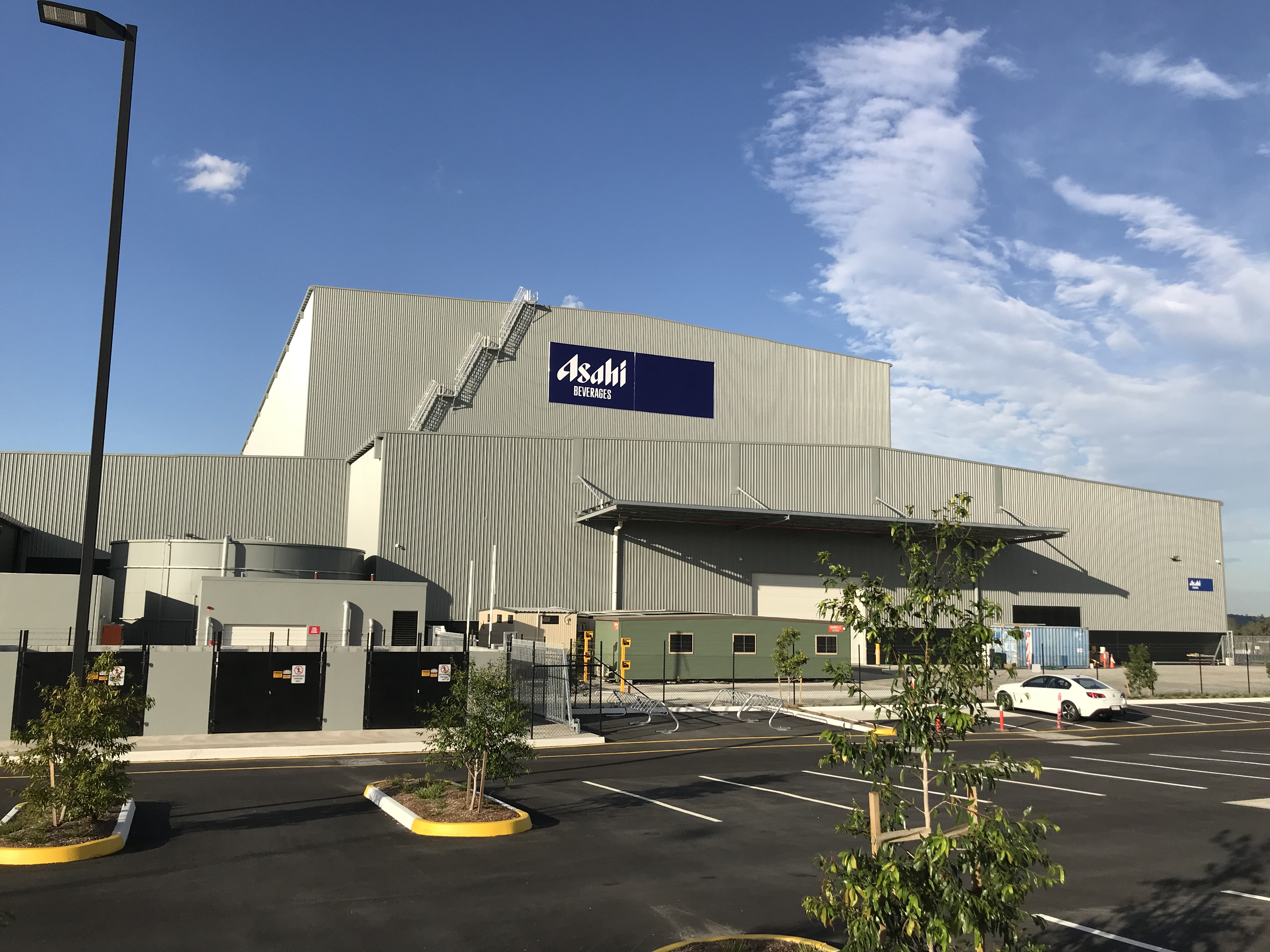
- Asahi Beverages in the industrial estate, 2017

- Interactive map of Heathwood
- Coordinates: 27.6411°S 152.9905°E
- Country: Australia
- State: Queensland
- City: Brisbane
- LGA: City of Brisbane (Calamvale Ward)
- Location: 23.0 km (14.3 mi) SSW of Brisbane CBD
- Established: 1975

Government
  - State electorates: Algester; Jordan
  - Federal division: Oxley

Area
  - Total: 5.0 km^{2} (1.9 sq mi)

Population
  - Total: 4,944 (2021 census)
  - Density: 989/km^{2} (2,561/sq mi)
- Time zone: UTC+10:00 (AEST)
- Postcode: 4110
Suburbs around Heathwood
Forest Lake	Pallara	Pallara
Forest Lake	Heathwood	Larapinta
Greenbank	Forestdale	Forestdale

Heathwood is an outer south-western suburb in the City of Brisbane, Queensland, Australia. In the 2021 census, Heathwood had a population of 4,944 people.

== Geography ==
Heathwood is 29.9 kilometres (18.6 mi) by road southwest of the Brisbane GPO. It is relatively small in area but marked by brand new big houses.

The Logan Motorway passes through the suburb from west (Forest Lake) to east (Larapinta). It divides the suburb into two distinct areas, the northern part which is residential and the southern part which is industrial in the south and south-western parts and undeveloped in the south-eastern part.

Heathwood is bounded to the north-east by Portree Crescent, Blunder Road, and Wadeville Street, to the south-west by Oxley Creek, to the south by Johnson Road, and to the west by Old Blunder Road.

All the streets in Heathwood are named after native Australian flora/plants and trees.

== History ==
The suburb was declared a suburb in 1970 when it was separated from Acacia Ridge. Heathwood was named after an early settler in the district.

== Demographics ==
In the 2011 census, Heathwood recorded a population of 1,820 people, 50.3% female and 49.7% male. The median age of the Heathwood population was 32 years of age, 5 years below the Australian median. 54.2% of people living in Heathwood were born in Australia, compared to the national average of 69.8%; the next most common countries of birth were New Zealand 7.6%, Vietnam 5.5%, England 4.7%, India 3.2%, South Africa 2.5%. 63.3% of people spoke only English at home; the next most common languages were 9.1% Vietnamese, 3.6% Hindi, 2.5% Mandarin, 1.1% Sinhalese, 1.1% Samoan.

In the 2016 census, Heathwood had a population of 2,794 people (an increase of 974 from the 2011 census).

In the 2021 census, Heathwood had a population of 4,944 people.

== Education ==
There are no schools in Heathwood. The nearest government primary school is Pallara State School in Pallara, but on the boundary with Heathwood. The nearest government secondary school is Forest Lake State High School in Forest Lake.

== Transport ==
Heathwood is connected to Brisbane CBD by a number of routes e.g. Centenary Highway through Forest Lake, Ipswich Motorway through Oxley, Logan Motorway and by rail through Richlands.

Transport for Brisbane operates two bus routes that serve stops in Heathwood:

- 118: to Brisbane City via Forest Lake and Logan Motorway (Note: Operates on weekday peak only in direction of peak.)
- 460: to Brisbane City via Forest Lake Shops, Richlands Station and Indooroopilly
