= Larapinta, Queensland =

Larapinta
- Suburb
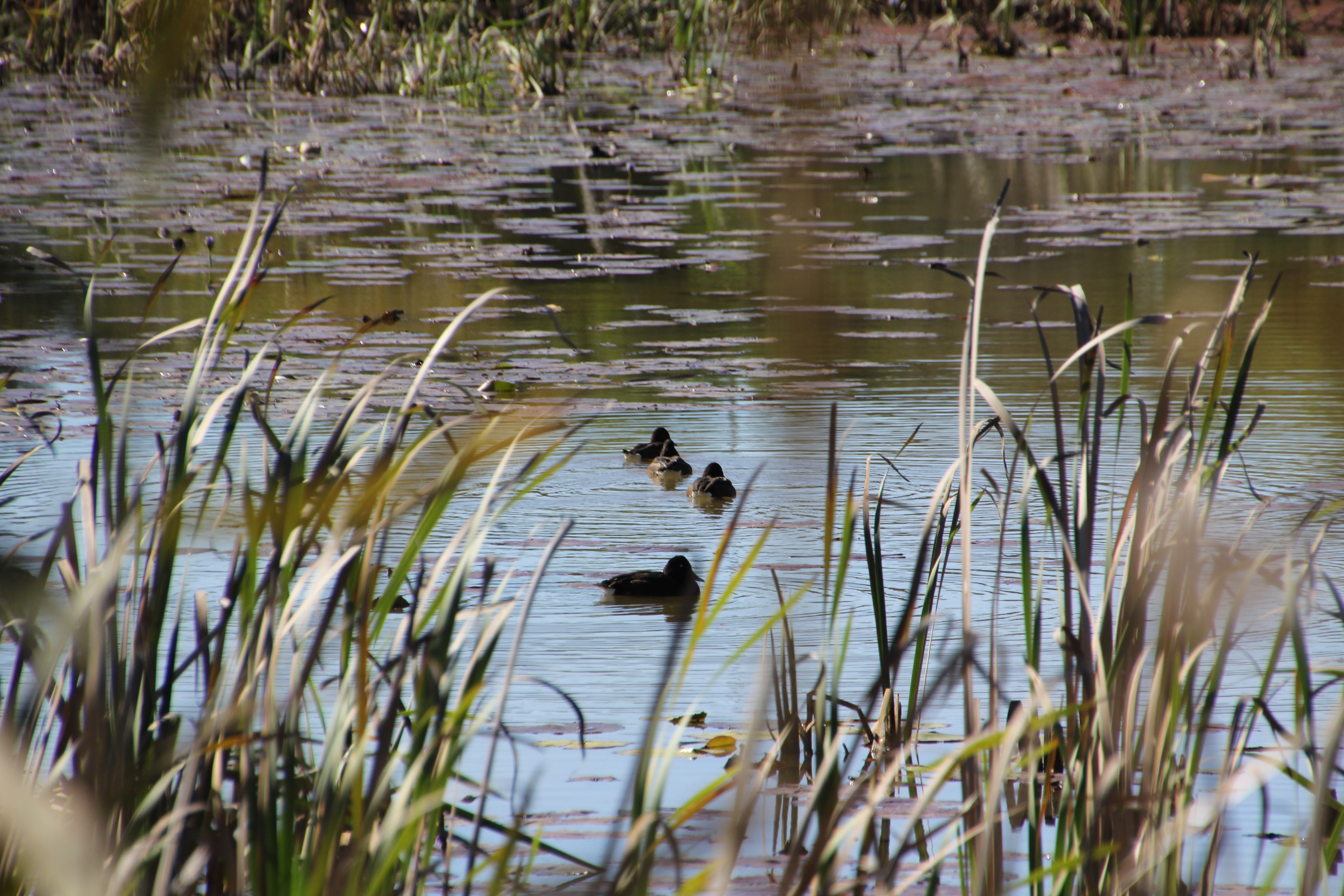
- Birdlife along Paradise Road, 2011

- Interactive map of Larapinta
- Coordinates: 27.6408°S 153.0063°E
- Country: Australia
- State: Queensland
- City: Brisbane
- LGA: City of Brisbane (Calamvale Ward)
- Location: 23.1 km (14.4 mi) SSW of Brisbane CBD
- Established: 1970

Government
  - State electorate: Algester
  - Federal division: Oxley

Area
  - Total: 6.0 km^{2} (2.3 sq mi)

Population
  - Total: 0 (2021 census)
  - Density: 0.00/km^{2} (0.00/sq mi)
- Time zone: UTC+10:00 (AEST)
- Postcode: 4110
Suburbs around Larapinta
Pallara	Pallara	Algester
Heathwood	Larapinta	Parkinson
Heathwood	Forestdale	Hillcrest

Larapinta is an outer southern industrial suburb in the City of Brisbane, Queensland, Australia.

Larapinta is on the boundary with Logan City. The industrial area has become a new addition to the expansion of Brisbane's industry, including the purpose-built South Brisbane Industrial Park in nearby Heathwood.

In the 2021 census, Larapinta had "no people or a very low population" .

== Geography ==
The Sydney–Brisbane rail corridor passes along the eastern border of the suburb. The Logan Motorway bisects the suburb in an east–west direction.

The north and west of the suburb is bounded by Oxley Creek.

In the south the Glider Forest Conservation Area has been created to protect a large tract of bushland.

== History ==
Larapinta means "flowing water" and was named due to the presence of Oxley Creek . Sand mining has occurred in the area, resulting in a change of course for the main stream of the creek.

== Demographics ==
At the 2011 census, Larapinta had "no people or a very low population" .

In the 2016 census, Larapinta had "no people or a very low population" .

In the 2021 census, Larapinta had "no people or a very low population" .
