= Boronia Heights, Queensland =

Boronia Heights
- Suburb
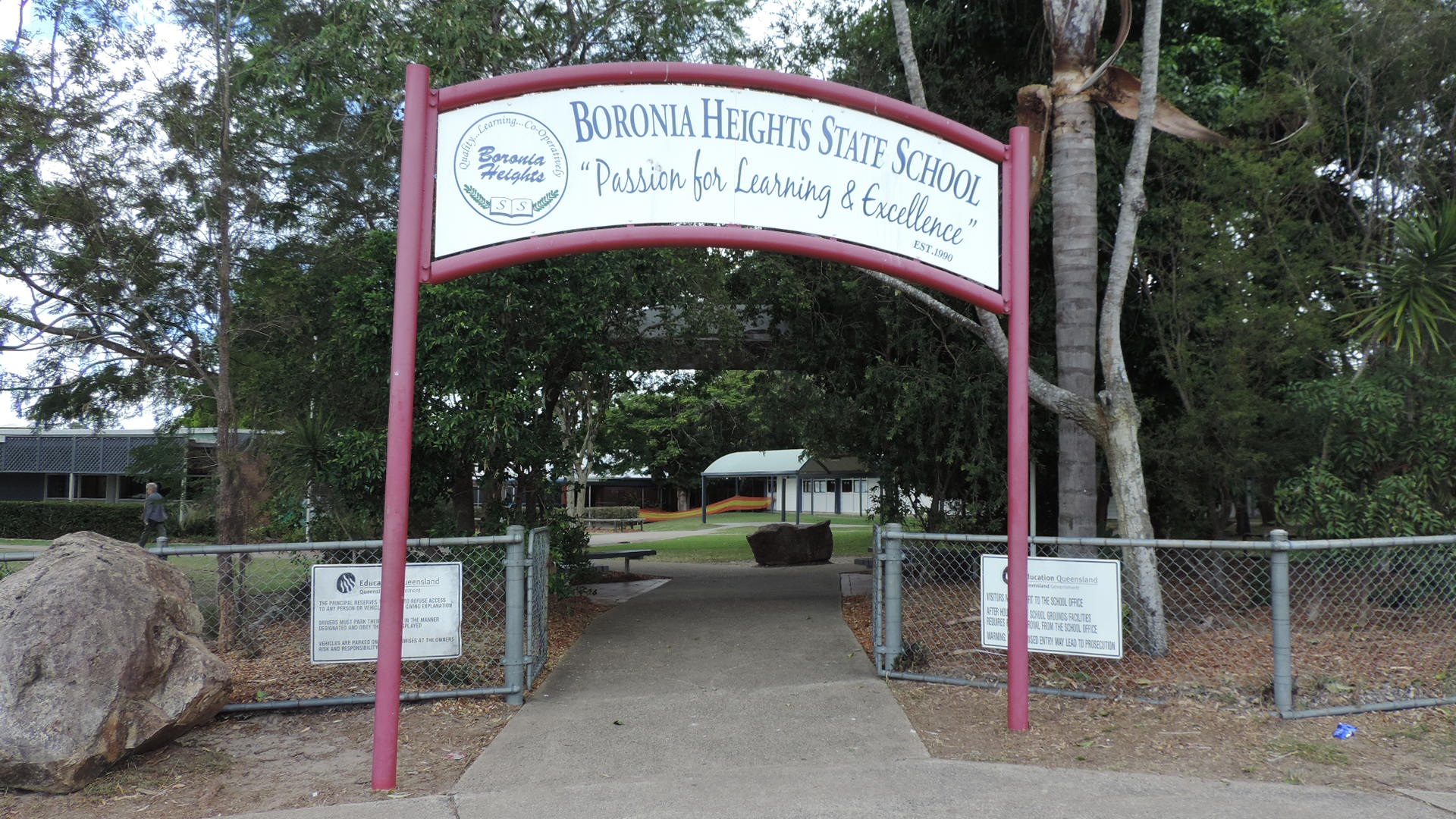
- Boronia Heights State School, 2014

- Interactive map of Boronia Heights
- Coordinates: 27.6886°S 153.0191°E
- Country: Australia
- State: Queensland
- City: Logan City
- LGA: Logan City
- Location: 13.0 km (8.1 mi) SW of Logan Central; 29.4 km (18.3 mi) from Brisbane CBD

Government
  - State electorate: Logan
  - Federal division: Forde

Area
  - Total: 4.3 km^{2} (1.7 sq mi)

Population
  - Total: 8,175 (2021 census)
  - Density: 1,901/km^{2} (4,920/sq mi)
- Time zone: UTC+10:00 (AEST)
- Postcode: 4124
Suburbs around Boronia Heights
Forestdale	Hillcrest	Regents Park
Greenbank	Boronia Heights	Park Ridge
Greenbank	Greenbank	Park Ridge

Boronia Heights is a suburb in the City of Logan, Queensland, Australia. In the 2021 census, Boronia Heights had a population of 8,175 people.

== Geography ==
Boronia Heights lies to the west of Park Ridge.

== History ==
Boronia Heights was known as the Logan Ridges through to the early 1890s.

Boronia Heights State School opened on 29 January 1990.

Boronia Heights was gazetted as a suburb in October 1991 and was named after the first residential housing estate in the area.

== Demographics ==
In the 2011 census, Boronia Heights recorded a population of 7,604 people, 51.6% female and 48.4% male. The median age of the Boronia Heights population was 30 years, 7 years below the national median of 37. 71.4% of people living in Boronia Heights were born in Australia. The other top responses for country of birth were New Zealand 7.4%, England 3.4%, Philippines 1.1%, India 0.9%, Fiji 0.7%. 83.6% of people spoke only English at home; the next most common languages were 1.3% Samoan, 0.8% Urdu, 0.8% Hindi, 0.7% German, 0.5% Mandarin.

In the 2016 census, Boronia Heights had a population of 7,862 people.

In the 2021 census, Boronia Heights had a population of 8,175 people.

== Education ==
Boronia Heights State School is a government primary (Prep-6) school for boys and girls at 194 Middle Road (27.6842°S 153.0178°E). In 2018, the school had an enrolment of 638 students with 48 teachers (44 full-time equivalent) and 33 non-teaching staff (21 full-time equivalent). It includes a special education program.

There are no secondary schools in Boronia Heights; the nearest government secondary school is Park Ridge State High School in neighbouring Park Ridge to the east.

== Amenities ==
The Boronia Bushland Reserve offers opportunities for bushwalking, barbecues and picnics. The bushland is home to many species of Australian fauna including eastern grey kangaroos, bandicoots, goannas, possums and koalas. The area has many scribbly gums, characterised by the scribbly lines on the otherwise smooth grey trunks.
