= Heritage Park, Queensland =

Heritage Park
- Suburb
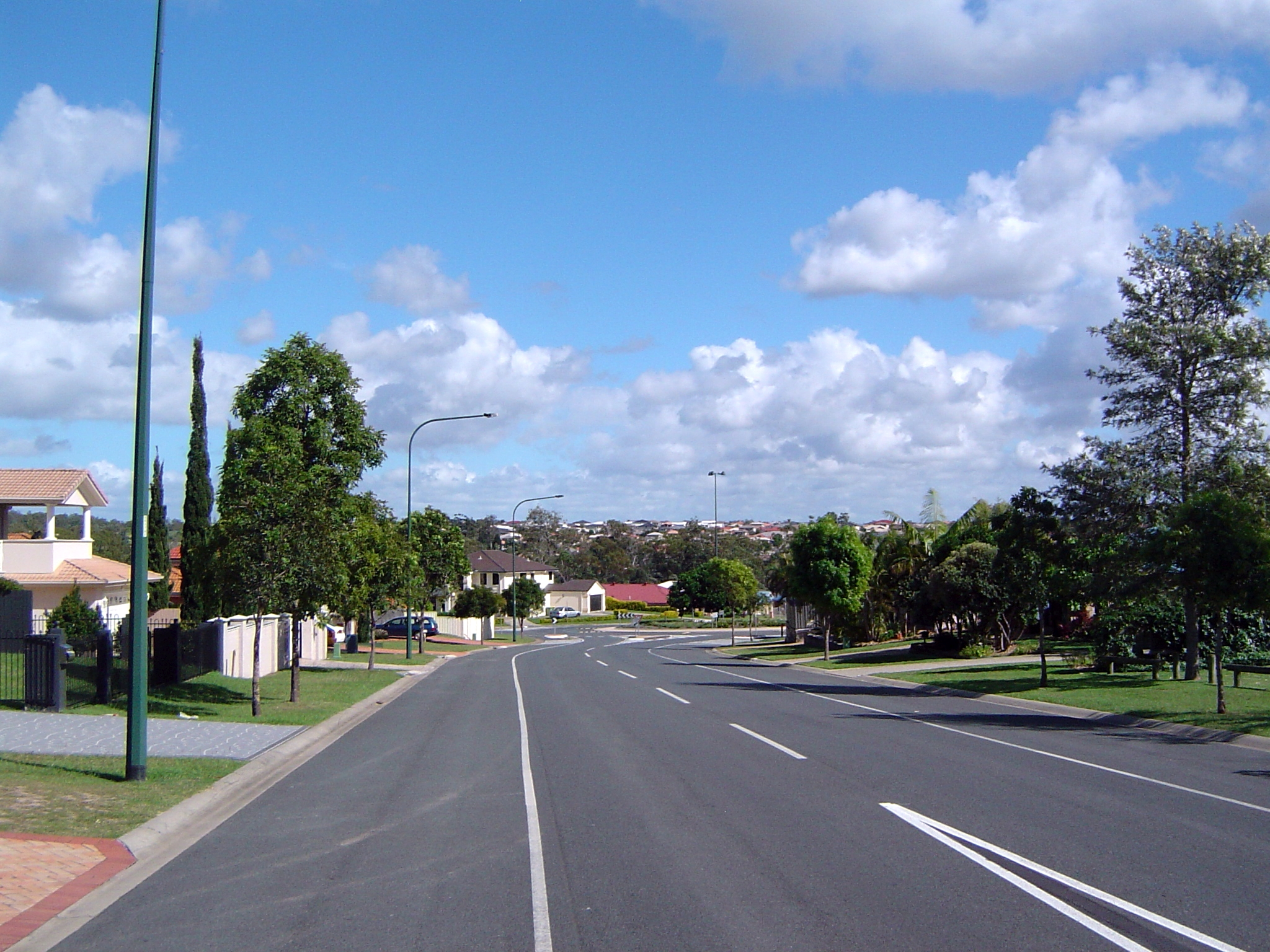
- Lamberth Road, 2014

- Interactive map of Heritage Park
- Coordinates: 27.6825°S 153.06°E
- Country: Australia
- State: Queensland
- City: Logan City
- LGA: Logan City
- Location: 9.3 km (5.8 mi) SW of Logan Central; 32.8 km (20.4 mi) S of Brisbane CBD

Government
  - State electorate: Woodridge
  - Federal division: Rankin

Area
  - Total: 4.7 km^{2} (1.8 sq mi)

Population
  - Total: 4,930 (2021 census)
  - Density: 1,049/km^{2} (2,720/sq mi)
- Time zone: UTC+10:00 (AEST)
- Postcode: 4118
Suburbs around Heritage Park
Browns Plains	Browns Plains	Berrinba
Regents Park	Heritage Park	Crestmead
Park Ridge	Park Ridge	Park Ridge

Heritage Park is a suburb in the City of Logan, Queensland, Australia. In the 2021 census, Heritage Park had a population of 4,930 people.

== History ==
The area was first settled by Joseph Shirley and William George in the area of the present landfill; at that time it was part of Browns Plains. Suburban development commenced in 1985.

The suburb name Heritage Park was proposed by the land developer and formally adopted in 1991.

Starting with a congregation of 22 people, the Browns Plains Presbyterian Church was built in 1995 on a 10-acre (4.0 ha) site.

== Demographics ==
Census	Population	Notes
2011 census	4,874	The population was 50.1% female and 49.9% male. The median age of the Heritage Park population was 32 years, 5 years below the national median of 37. 70.1% of people living in Heritage Park were born in Australia. The other top responses for country of birth were New Zealand 8.6%, England 4.5%, Scotland 1.3%, Philippines 1.1%, South Africa 0.9%, South America 0.1%. 83.9% of people spoke only English at home; the next most common languages were 1.4% Samoan, 0.9% Arabic, 0.7% Punjabi, 0.6% Hindi, 0.6% Serbian, 0.1% Spanish.
2016 census	4,976	
2021 census	4,930	The population was 50.1% female and 49.9% male. The median age of the Heritage Park population was 37 years, 1 year below the national median of 38. 68% of people living in Heritage Park were born in Australia. The other top responses for country of birth were New Zealand 8.0%, England 3.3%, India 2.3%, Philippines 1.%, South, Fiji 0.9%. 77.4% of people spoke only English at home; the next most common languages were 2.1% Arabic, 1.8% Punjabi, 1.3% Samoan, 1.2% Hindi, 1.1% Mandarin.

== Facilities ==
Browns Plains Waste & Recycling Facility is at 41 Recycle Way (27.6743°S 153.0691°E). It has dedicated facilities for recycling, green waste, and large steel, in addition to regular garbage disposal. Recycled materials are sold through the Logan Recycling Market with profits supporting community groups.

== Amenities ==
Browns Plains Presbyterian Church is at 276-284 Waller Road (27.686408°S 153.0502°E).

There are a number of parks in the area, including:

- Isle Of Ely Park (27.6870°S 153.0513°E)
- Koala Park (27.6767°S 153.0545°E)
- Spurway Park (27.6827°S 153.0535°E)

== Education ==
There are no schools in Heritage Park. The nearest government primary schools are Yugumbir State School in neighbouring Regents Park to the west and Browns Plains State School in neighbouring Browns Plains to the north-west. The nearest government secondary school is Browns Plains State High School in Browns Plains.
