= Forest Lake State High School =

Coordinates: 27°37′25.37″S 152°58′18.14″E

- Brisbane, Queensland; Australia

Information
- Type: Co-education, secondary, public, day school
- Motto: Our Education. Our Future.
- Established: 2001
- Principal: Sally Hawkes
- Enrolment: ~1200–1300
- Campus: Urban (Forest Lake)
- Colours: Green and navy blue
- Website: forestlakeshs.eq.edu.au

Forest Lake State High School (FLSHS) is a secondary state school located in Forest Lake, Queensland, Australia.

== History ==
The school was opened in 2001, with only year 8. Year levels increased each year with the first cohort of year 12 students finishing their secondary education in 2005. FLSHS is an enrolment-managed school which means students, and their parents, must live in the school's catchment area to be eligible for enrolment. FLSHS has developed a strong reputation for academic and sporting excellence. In 2011, the school has about 1280 students enrolled in years 8–12.

== Campus ==
The FLSHS campus consists of both indoor and outdoor sporting facilities, extensive computer laboratories and a high-class resource center that was built in partnership with the St. Johns Anglican College.

== School system ==
To maintain a small school feel and provide opportunities to develop strong relationships between students and staff, the school operates as a separate middle school (years 7, 8 and 9) and senior school (years 10, 11 and 12). There are 3 deputy principals (middle school, senior school and operations) and a student coordinator in both the middle and senior school. 10 heads of department lead, manage and supervise the curriculum in their respective areas. The head of special education services and specially trained special education teachers develop and provide programs and services for the students with a disability who are enrolled at the school. There is also an Academic Program of Excellence program for students who pass testing during their last year of primary school (year 6).

== Sport ==
The school has had numerous achievements in the sport at inter-school, district and Gala Day competitions. The school is in rugby league, soccer, volleyball, touch football, rugby union and netball. The school has also achieved awards in the annual cross country and athletics carnivals.

== See also ==
- List of schools in Queensland
