= Regents Park State School =

Location
- Emerald Drive, Regents Park; Logan, Queensland; Australia; 27°40′55.33″S 153°2′5.37″E

Information
- Type: State, co-educational, primary day school
- Motto: Every Child Succeeds
- Established: 1 January 1994
- Principal: Ronnie (Veronica) Kostaschuk
- Faculty: 49
- Grades: P–6
- Gender: Mixed
- Age: 5 to 12
- Enrolment: ~700 (2024)
- Student to teacher ratio: 13:1
- Hours in school day: 6
- Campus: Suburban
- Houses: Alpha, Beta, Gamma
- Colours: Maroon, jade and blue
- Mascot: Platypus
- Nickname: RPSS
- Publication: Platychat
- Affiliation: Queensland State Schools
- Website: regeparkss.eq.edu.au

Regents Park State School is a co-educational state primary school located in the suburb of Regents Park in Logan City, Queensland, Australia. It was established on 1 January 1994 and has approximately 700 pupils as of 2024.

== Facilities ==
The school has classroom buildings arranged in blocks for students of junior and senior grades; a multi-purpose covered area with bathroom facilities; a tuck shop and uniform shop, a library and two fully equipped computer labs. A large Activity Hall was opened in 2008 which is used for school assemblies, meetings, recreational activities, and is also open for community events. The administration building is located at the front, and houses principal and staff offices. The school has several oval grounds for sport activities, in addition to cricket nets, tennis and basketball facilities.

Behind the school grounds, there is also an environmental park, known as the Vince Bull Environmental Park. The park is located along the banks of Scrubby Creek and has a wide variety of trees and plantations.

== Curriculum and students ==
The school provides education from preschool level to sixth grade. The system of education complies with the Australian Curriculum, and is based on English, Mathematics, Science, History and Geography. There is also an emphasis on other disciplines such as computer studies, literacy and numeracy, drama and sport. Assessments under the NAPLAN Programs are conducted each year for pupils studying in grades three and five. The student population is diverse and multicultural. In the final year of grade six, students are offered leadership opportunities by participating as school captains and vice-captains, sports house captains and vice-captains, or student leaders, while students in junior classes can contribute to the student council. Support is available for students who have special needs.

== Uniform ==
The uniform is based on the school colours of maroon, jade and blue with black shoes. Boys wear a checked maroon, jade and blue shirt with maroon shorts, while girls have a maroon, jade and blue checked dress or maroon culottes or shorts. Maroon jackets, jumpers and tracksuits are part of the winter uniform while the sport uniform is a maroon, jade and blue polo shirt accompanied with maroon hats and shorts. Jewellery is not permitted except for a wrist watch, medical or religious symbols (upon approval) or small studs on each ear.

== Extracurricular activities ==
A range of intra/inter-sport and extracurricular activities are offered at Regents Park. The school has a house system where three houses (Alpha, Beta, Gamma) compete for championship on sports day events. A fete is also held at the school annually for children and families, featuring games and activities.

Parents and members of the community can apprise themselves of updates and provide their input on school policies, activities and decision-making, as well as interact with staff. This is done through a Parents and Citizens Association meeting held on the second week of each month. A school newsletter called Platychat is published fortnightly.

== Gallery ==
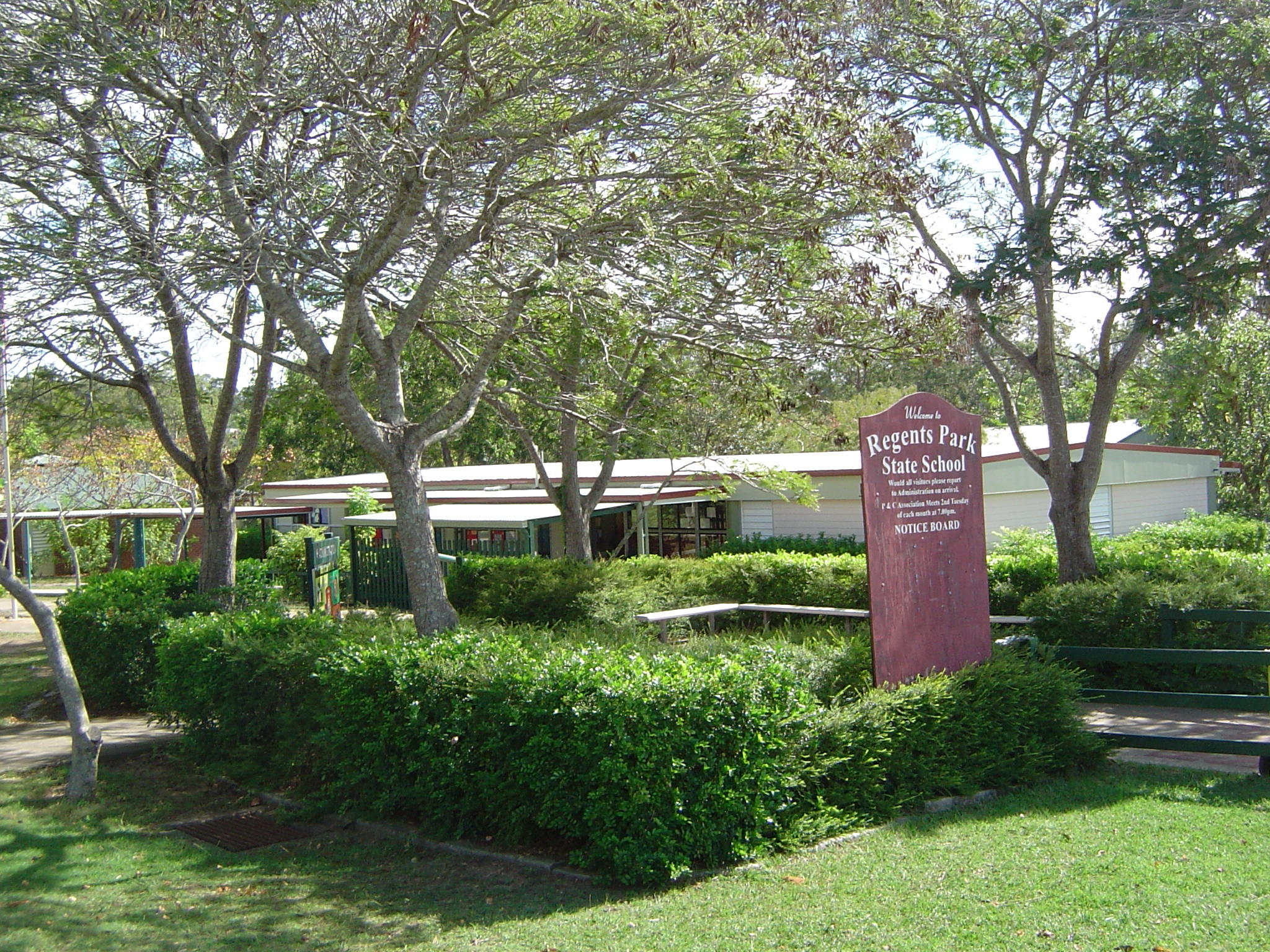
Entrance to the school

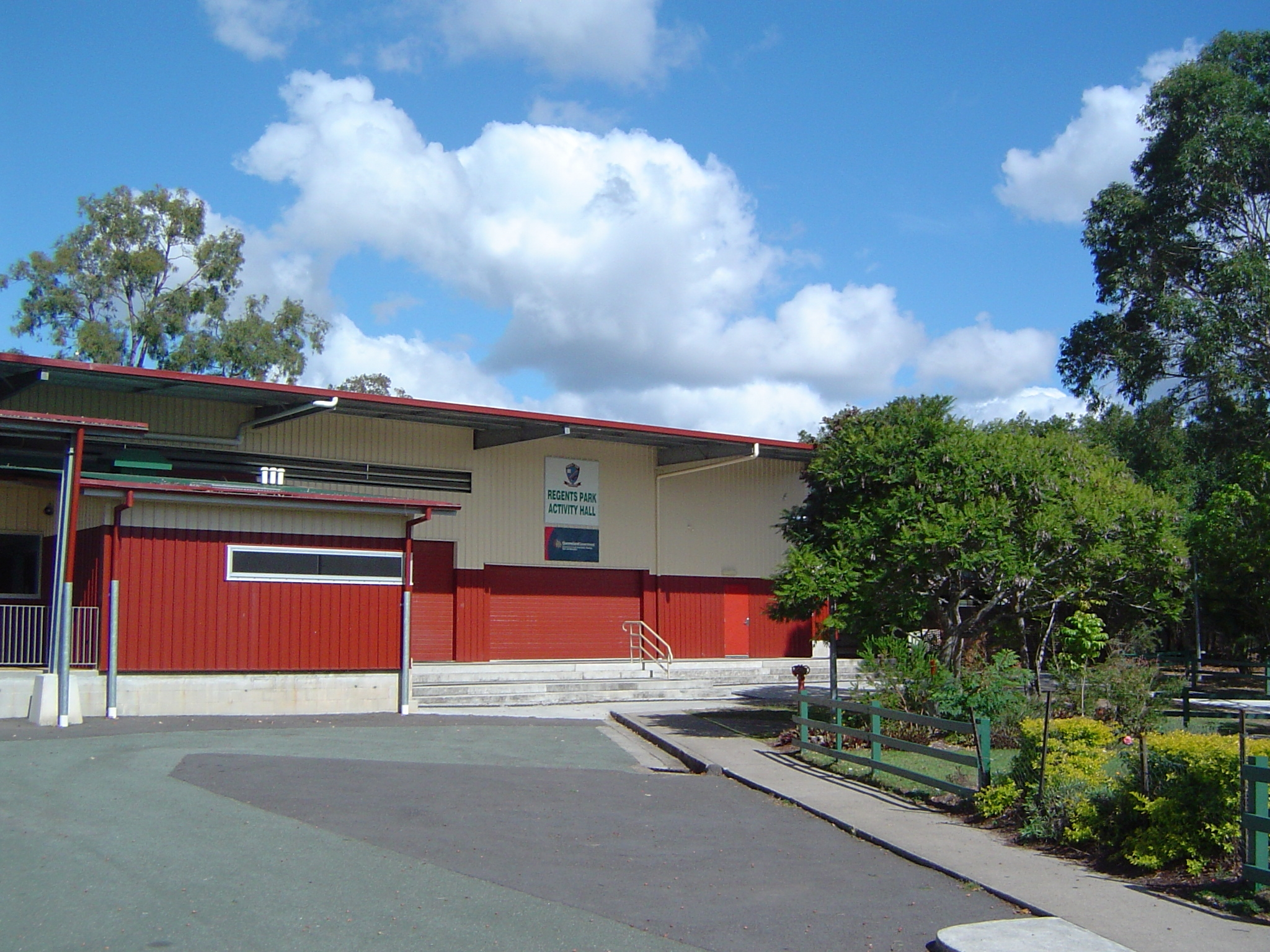
The school's Activity Hall

== Notable alumni ==
- Caleb Timu, rugby footballer
- Ashley Moloney, decathlete and Olympian.

== See also ==
- List of schools in Greater Brisbane
