= Browns Plains, Queensland =

Browns Plains
- Suburb
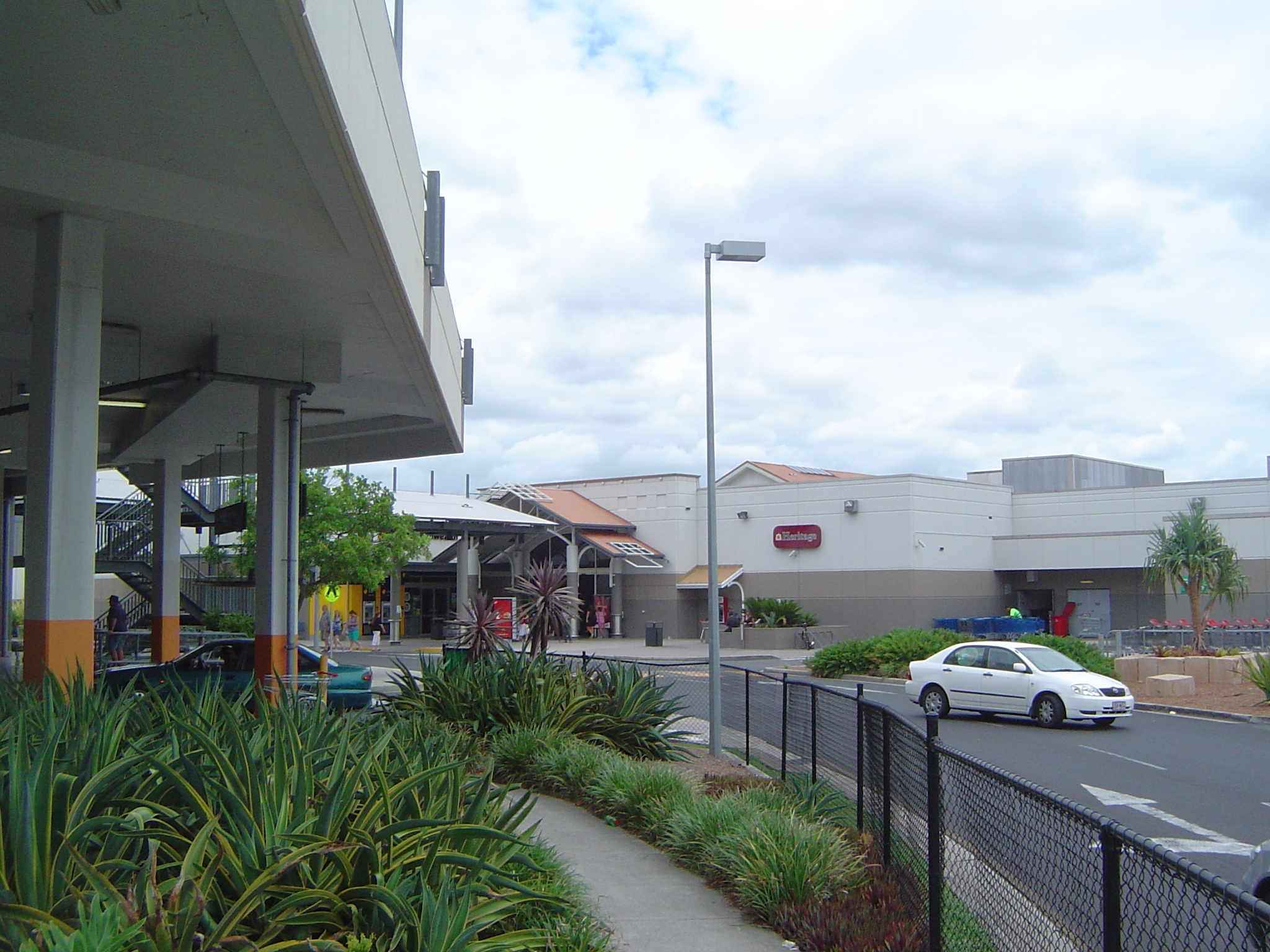
- Grand Plaza Shopping Centre, 2014

- Interactive map of Browns Plains
- Coordinates: 27.6611°S 153.0513°E
- Country: Australia
- State: Queensland
- City: Logan City
- LGA: Logan City
- Location: 7.2 km (4.5 mi) WSW of Logan Central; 30.1 km (18.7 mi) S of Brisbane CBD

Government
  - State electorates: Algester; Woodridge
  - Federal division: Rankin

Area
  - Total: 4.5 km^{2} (1.7 sq mi)

Population
  - Total: 6,632 (2021 census)
  - Density: 1,474/km^{2} (3,820/sq mi)
- Time zone: UTC+10:00 (AEST)
- Postcode: 4118
Suburbs around Browns Plains
Parkinson	Drewvale	Berrinba
Parkinson	Browns Plains	Berrinba
Hillcrest	Regents Park	Heritage Park

Browns Plains is a suburb in the City of Logan, Queensland, Australia. In the 2021 census, Browns Plains had a population of 6,632 people.

== Geography ==
The suburb's western boundary is marked by the Mount Lindesay Highway.

Scrubby Creek, a tributary of Slacks Creek, which is itself a tributary of the Logan River, is the main waterway in the area.

== History ==
The names Browns Plains became in use as a place name in 1840. The district was mostly used for growing tobacco until the 1950s . The first Cobb and Co coach services were running through Browns Plains as early as 1863.

Brown's Plains Provisional School opened circa 1878 open on site of Waller Park, only to close due to effects of major drought in 1902.

A new post office was opened in 1980 and the name reverted to Browns Plains.

St Bernardine's Catholic School opened on 27 January 1982; it is now within the neighbouring suburb of Regents Park.

Browns Plains State School opened on 24 January 1983.

Browns Plains State High School opened on 29 January 1985.

The Grand Plaza Shopping Centre opened in October 1994. It had a fountain, live palm trees, and an open central atrium. In 2006, a $55 million development expanded the centre to provide for new stores and a multi-deck car park. In 2021, the centre trialled drone delivery of purchases weighing less than 1.5 kilograms (3.3 lb). After 30 years of operation, the Event Cinema closed in 2024.

The new Logan West Library, which replaced the old one near the Greenbank RSL, opened in 2003.

== Demographics ==
In the 2011 census, Browns Plains had a population of 5,574 people.

In the 2016 census, Browns Plains recorded a population of 6,309 people, 50.5% female and 49.5% male. The median age of the Browns Plains population was 32 years, six years below the national median of 38. 59.8% of people living in Browns Plains were born in Australia, slightly lower than the national average of 66.7%. The other top responses for country of birth were New Zealand 9.2%, England 2.1%, Philippines 1.8%, India 1.6% and China 1.3%. 69.7% of people spoke only English at home; the next most common languages were 2.8% Mandarin, 1.5% Samoan, 1.3% Hindi and 1.2% Urdu.

In the 2021 census, Browns Plains had a population of 6,632 people, 50.3% female and 49.7% male. The median age of the Browns Plains population was 34, four years below the national median average of 38.

== Education ==
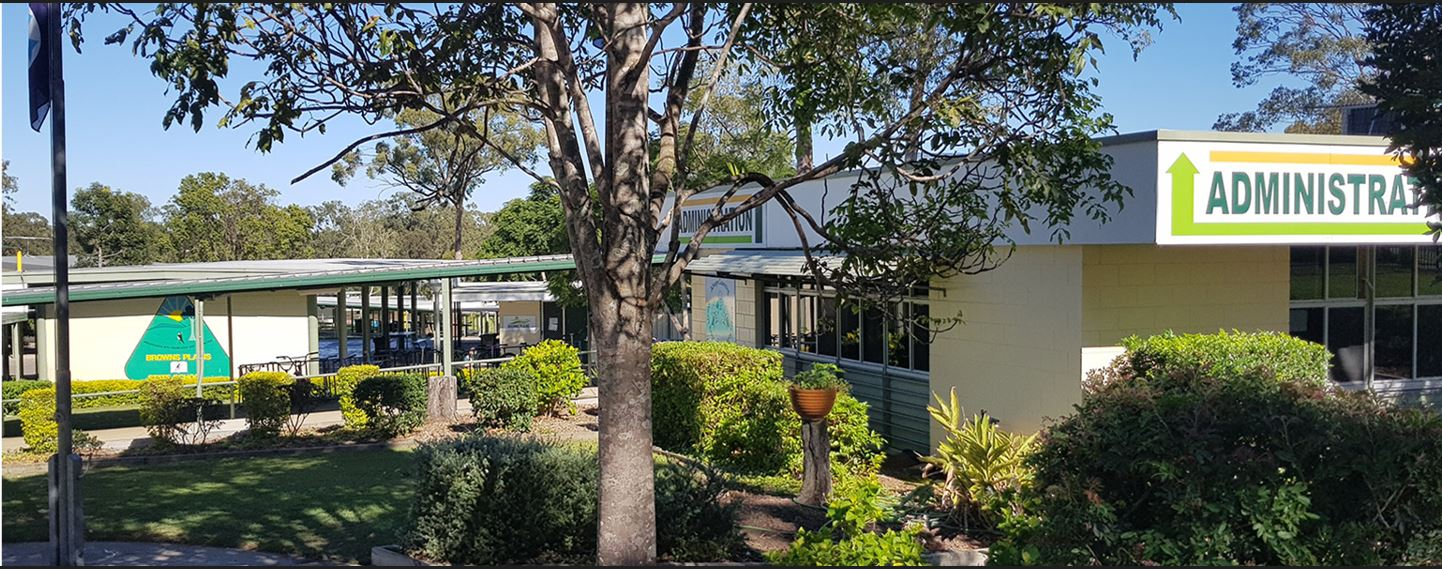
Browns Plains State School, 2023

Browns Plains State School is a government primary (Early Childhood-6) school for boys and girls at 1-29 Mayfair Drive (27.6677°S 153.0545°E). It includes a special education program. In 2018, the school had an enrolment of 551 students with 45 teachers (42 full-time equivalent) and 30 non-teaching staff (19 full-time equivalent). In 2022, the school had 620 students with 48 teachers (43 full-time equivalent) and 35 non-teaching staff (22 full-time equivalent).

Browns Plains State High School is a government secondary (7-12) school for boys and girls in Ivor Street (27.6699°S 153.0540°E). It includes a special education program. In 2018, the school had an enrolment of 988 students with 88 teachers (84 full-time equivalent) and 47 non-teaching staff (33 full-time equivalent). In 2022, the school had an enrolment of 1,083 students with 91 teachers (89 full-time equivalent) and 53 non-teaching staff (39 full-time equivalent).

== Amenities ==
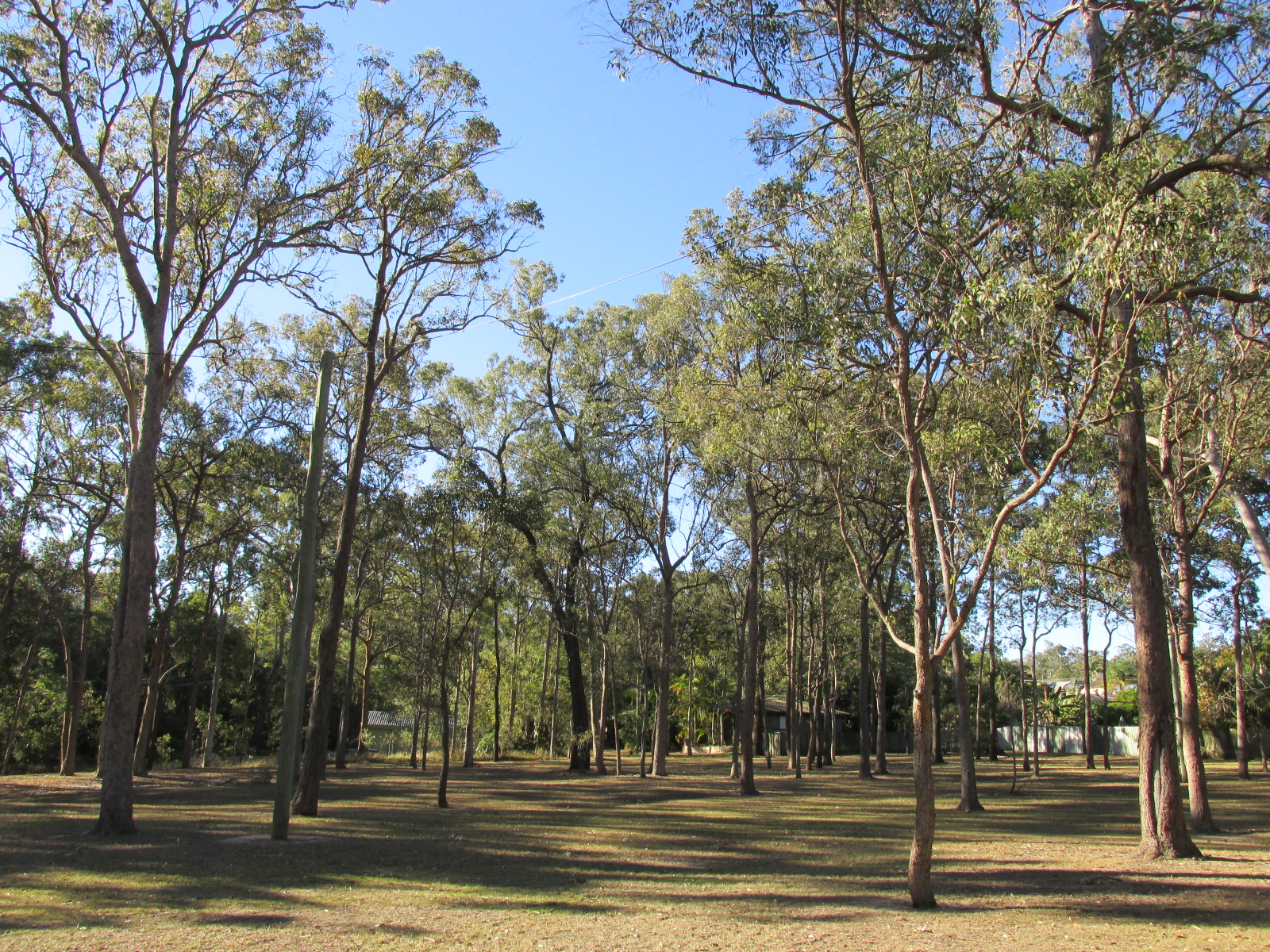
Acacia Park, 2014

The Grand Plaza Shopping Centre is at 27-49 Browns Plains Road.

The Logan City Council operate the Logan West public library at 69 Grand Plaza Drive.

There are a number of parks in the suburb, including:

- Acacia Park (27.6574°S 153.0438°E)
- Adam Park (27.6602°S 153.0602°E)
- Barrallier Place Park (27.6553°S 153.0524°E)
- Eyre Place Park (27.6546°S 153.0607°E)
- Fleet Park (27.6651°S 153.0580°E)
- Forestglen Park (27.6613°S 153.0519°E)
- Grosvenor Park (27.6691°S 153.0661°E)
- Harmony Court Park (27.6581°S 153.0536°E)
- Koala Park (27.6739°S 153.0550°E)
- Michelle Johnstone Park (27.6580°S 153.0621°E)
- Ranchwood Ave Park (27.6577°S 153.0456°E)
- Waller Park (27.6651°S 153.0511°E)
- Zorina Park (27.6610°S 153.0580°E)

== Transport ==
Browns Plains Grand Plaza is a terminus for Brisbane City bus services, making it an important transport hub connecting Logan City and Brisbane City bus services.
