= Regents Park, Queensland =

Regents Park
- Suburb
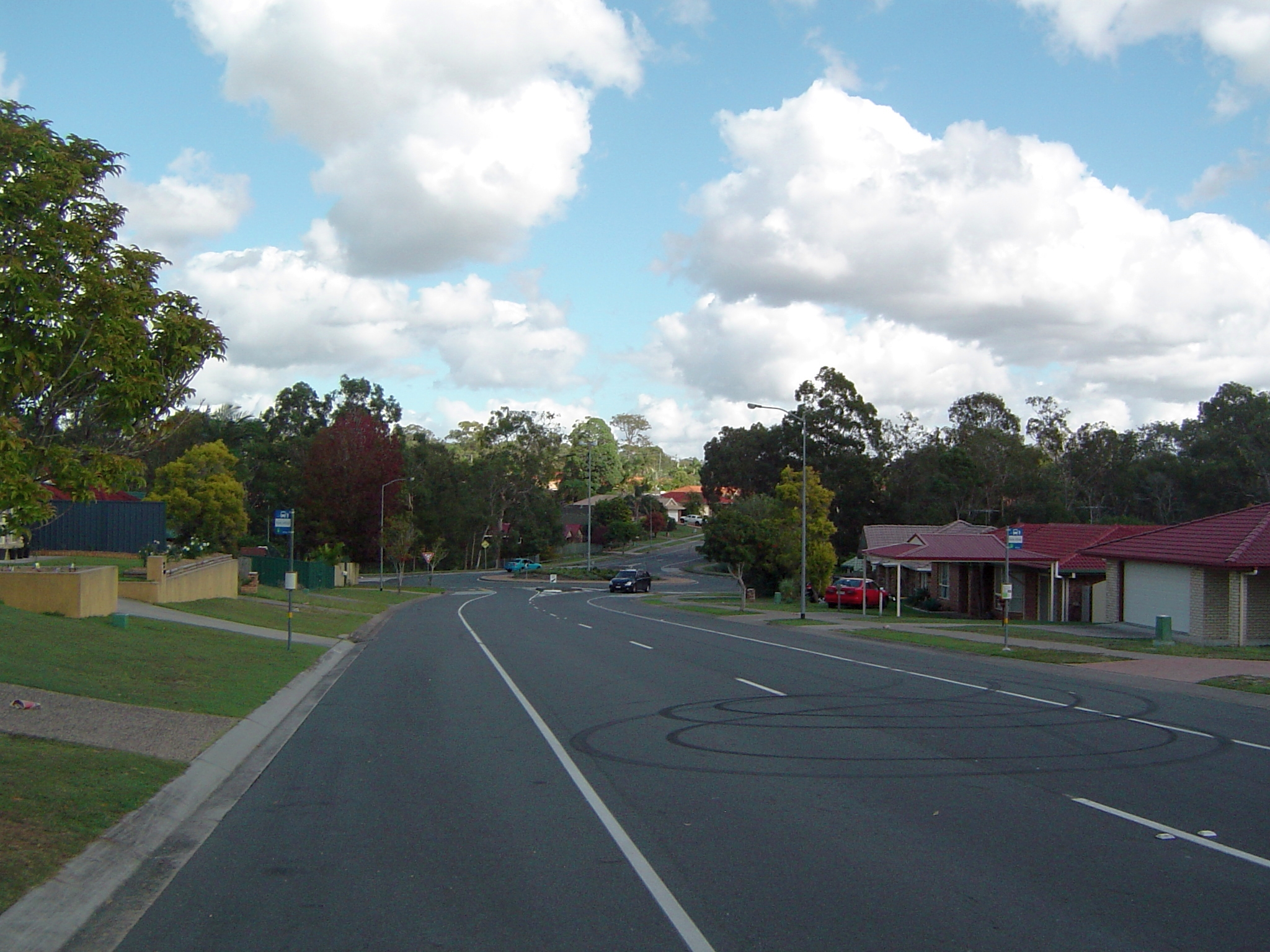
- Lamberth Road, 2014

- Interactive map of Regents Park
- Coordinates: 27.6766°S 153.0419°E
- Country: Australia
- State: Queensland
- City: Logan City
- LGA: Logan City
- Location: 19.8 km (12.3 mi) N of Logan Central; 33.2 km (20.6 mi) S of Brisbane CBD

Government
  - State electorates: Algester; Woodridge
  - Federal division: Rankin

Area
  - Total: 4.8 km^{2} (1.9 sq mi)

Population
  - Total: 11,103 (2021 census)
  - Density: 2,313/km^{2} (5,990/sq mi)
- Time zone: UTC+10:00 (AEST)
- Postcode: 4118
Suburbs around Regents Park
Hillcrest	Browns Plains	Browns Plains
Hillcrest	Regents Park	Heritage Park
Boronia Heights	Park Ridge	Park Ridge

Regents Park is a suburb in the City of Logan, Queensland, Australia. In the 2021 census, Regents Park had a population of 11,103 people.

== Geography ==
The suburb is 4.76 square kilometres (1.84 sq mi) in area and the land use is almost entirely residential.

== History ==
Regents Park was originally part of Browns Plains. It was subdivided for residential housing in the early 1974.The first name for this area was Emerald Hills, hence Emerald Drive The name Regents Park was proposed by the land developer.

St Bernardine's Catholic School opened on 27 January 1982.

Yugumbir State School opened on 28 January 1986. The name 'Yugumbir' is an Aboriginal word for the district.

Regents Park State School opened on 1 January 1994.

== Demographics ==
Historical population

Year	Pop.	±% p.a.
1991	5,399	—
1996	8,206	+8.73%
2001	9,184	+2.28%
2006	9,538	+0.76%

Year	Pop.	±% p.a.
2011	10,657	+2.24%
2016	10,962	+0.57%
2021	11,103	+0.26%

In the 2011 census, Regents Park had a population of 10,657 people; the population was 50.5% female and 49.5% male. The median age of the Regents Park population was 30 years, 7 years below the Australian average. Children aged under 15 years made up 25.3% of the population and people aged 65 years and over made up 6.0% of the population. 67.1% of people living in Regents Park were born in Australia, similar to the national average of 69.8%. The other top responses for country of birth were New Zealand 9.2%, England 3.6%, Philippines 1.5%, Bosnia and Herzegovina 0.9%, South Africa 0.6%. 80.2% of people spoke only English at home; the next most popular languages were 1.3% Samoan, 1.2% Serbian, 1.2% Spanish, 0.8% Mandarin, 0.7% Croatian. The most common response for religious affiliation was No Religion 24.9%, followed by Catholic 23.1%, Anglican 15.8%, Uniting Church 5.0% and Presbyterian and Reformed 3.1%. The great majority of households (84.9%) were family households, 12.3% were single person households and 2.8% were group households. The average household size was 3.1 people.

In the 2021 census, Regents Park had a population of 11,103 people; the population was 50.9% female and 49.1% male. The median age of the Regents Park population was 34 years, 4 years below the Australian average. Children aged under 15 years made up 23.5% of the population and people aged 65 years and over made up 9.6% of the population. 65.3% of people living in Regents Park were born in Australia, similar to the national average of 66.9%. The other top responses for country of birth were New Zealand 7.6%, India 3.2%, England 2.5%, the Philippines 1.8% and China (without SARs) 1.2%. 71.1% of people spoke only English at home; the next most popular languages were 3.2% Punjabi, 2.3% Mandarin, 1.3% Serbian, 1.2.% Hindi and 1.0% Arabic. The most common response for religious affiliation was No Religion at 41.5%, followed by Catholic 17.0%, Anglican 8.0% and 3.9% were other Christians. The great majority of households (83.9%) were family households, 13.5% were single (or lone) person households and 2.6% were group households. The average household size was 3.0 people.

== Education ==
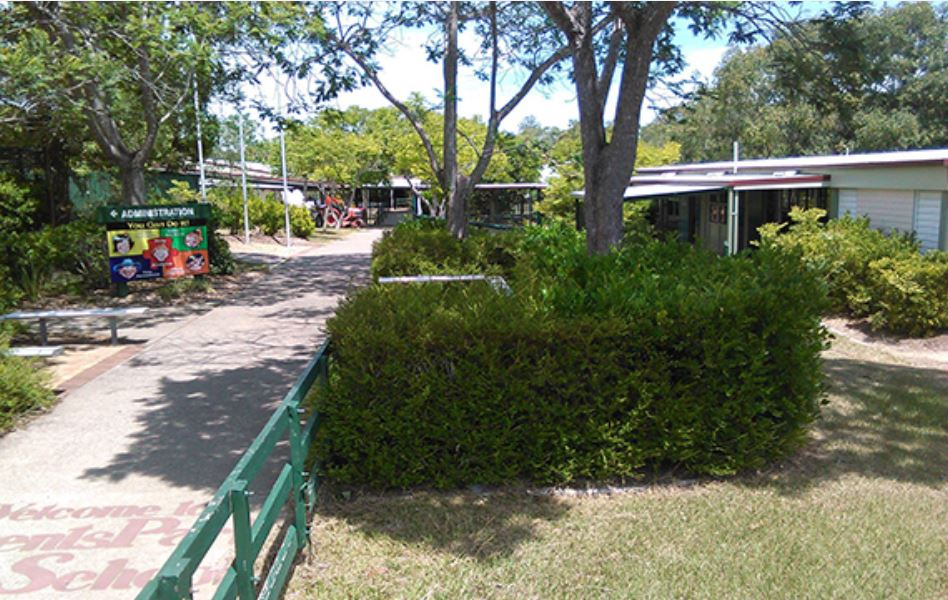
Regents Park State School

Regents Park State School is a government primary (Prep–6) school for boys and girls at Emerald Drive (27.6820°S 153.0350°E). In 2018, the school had an enrolment of 760 students with 58 teachers (51 full-time equivalent) and 46 non-teaching staff (34 full-time equivalent). It includes a special education program.

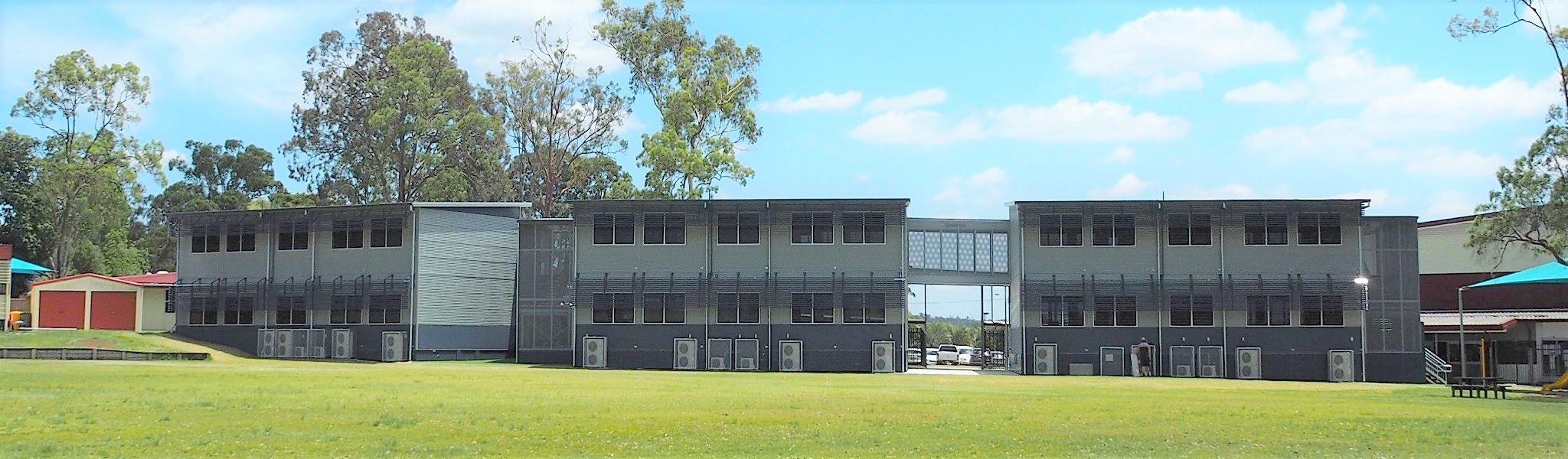
Yugumbir State School, 2022

Yugumbir State School is a government primary (Prep–6) school for boys and girls at Vansittart Road (27.6759°S 153.0494°E). In 2018, the school had an enrolment of 1,086 students with 77 teachers (73 full-time equivalent) and 42 non-teaching staff (29 full-time equivalent). It includes a special education program.

St Bernardine's School is a Catholic primary (Prep–6) school for boys and girls at 25 Vergulde Road (27.6697°S 153.0348°E). In 2018, the school had an enrolment of 738 students with 46 teachers (41 full-time equivalent) and 28 non-teaching staff (20 full-time equivalent).

There are no secondary schools in Regents Park. The nearest government secondary schools are Browns Plains State High School in neighbouring Browns Plains to the north-west and Park Ridge State High School in neighbouring Park Ridge to the south.

== Amenities ==
There are a number of parks in the suburb, including:

- Acorus Park (27.6836°S 153.0390°E)
- Charlton Street Park (27.6840°S 153.0494°E)
- Hyde Park (27.6739°S 153.0425°E)
- Redgum Drive Park (27.6783°S 153.0491°E)
- Regency Park (27.6697°S 153.0484°E)
- Regents Park (27.6703°S 153.0497°E)
- Shannon Ramsay Park (27.6837°S 153.0361°E)
- Waller Park (27.6651°S 153.0511°E)
