= The Lakes College =

Location
- North Lakes, Queensland; Australia; 27°14′01″S 153°01′23″E

Information
- Type: Independent co-educational primary and secondary day school
- Motto: To your faith add knowledge
- Religious affiliation: Uniting Church in Australia (Queensland Synod)
- Denomination: Uniting Church
- Established: 2005; 21 years ago
- Principal: Nicole Gregory
- Years: Prep–12
- Enrolment: c. 1000
- Campus type: Suburban
- Colours: Red, navy blue (and white)
- Newspaper: Tidings
- Website: www.thelakescollege.com.au

The Lakes College (also known as TLC) is an independent, co‑educational, Uniting Church‑affiliated primary and secondary school, located in the City of Moreton Bay suburb of North Lakes in Queensland, Australia. In 2022, they opened a new multi-purpose hall.
