= Forest Lake, Queensland =

Forest Lake
- Suburb
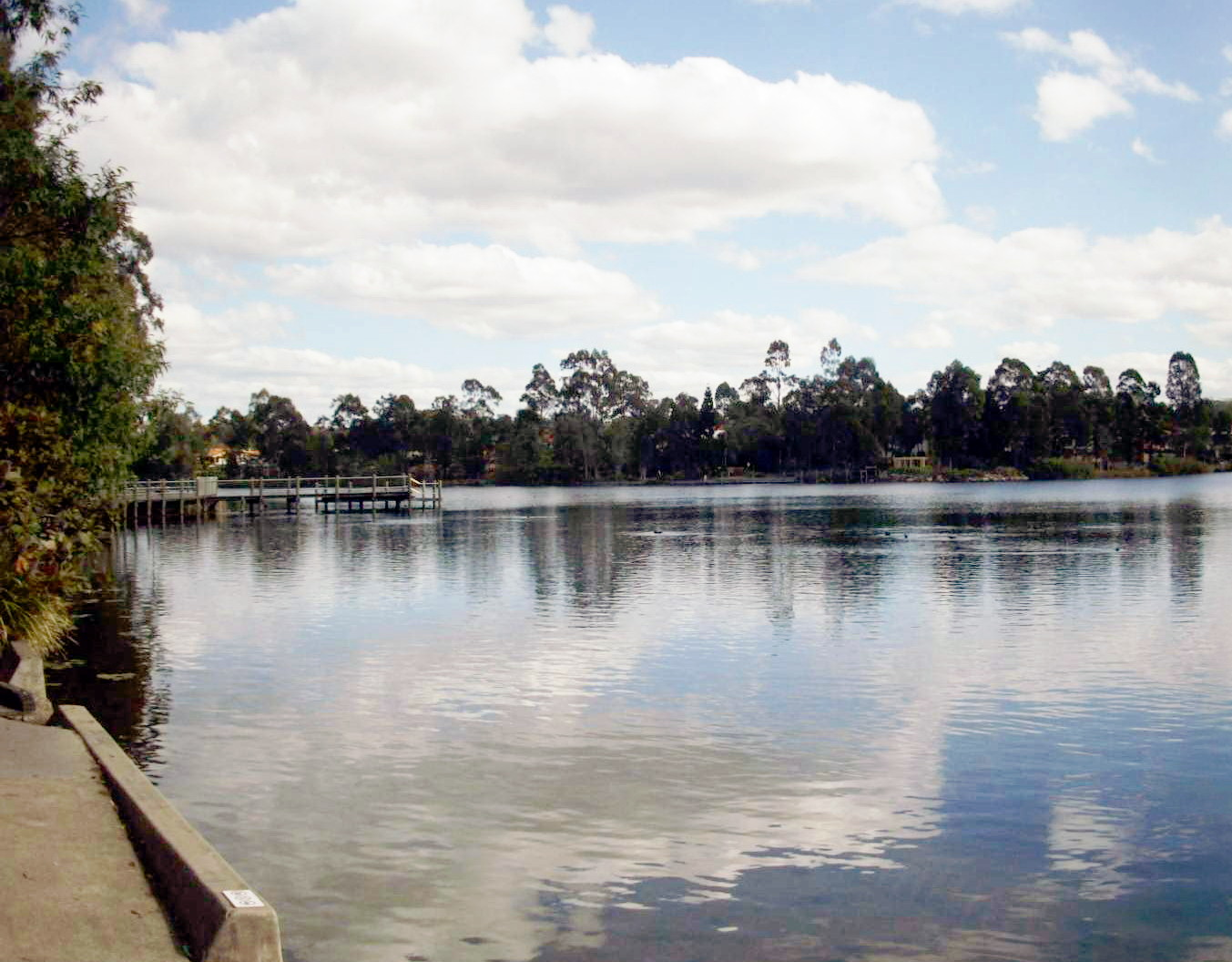
- The lake at Forest Lake

- Interactive map of Forest Lake
- Coordinates: 27.6227°S 152.9625°E
- Country: Australia
- State: Queensland
- City: Brisbane
- LGA: City of Brisbane (Forest Lake Ward, Calamvale Ward)
- Location: 23.7 km (14.7 mi) SW of Brisbane CBD

Government
  - State electorates: Inala; Algester
  - Federal division: Oxley

Area
  - Total: 9.9 km^{2} (3.8 sq mi)

Population
  - Total: 22,676 (2021 census)
  - Density: 2,291/km^{2} (5,932/sq mi)
- Time zone: UTC+10:00 (AEST)
- Postcode: 4078
Suburbs around Forest Lake
Wacol; Richlands	Inala	Doolandella
Ellen Grove	Forest Lake	Pallara
Carole Park	Greenbank	Heathwood

Forest Lake is an outer south-western suburb of the City of Brisbane, Queensland, Australia. In the 2021 census, Forest Lake had a population of 22,676 people.

== Geography ==
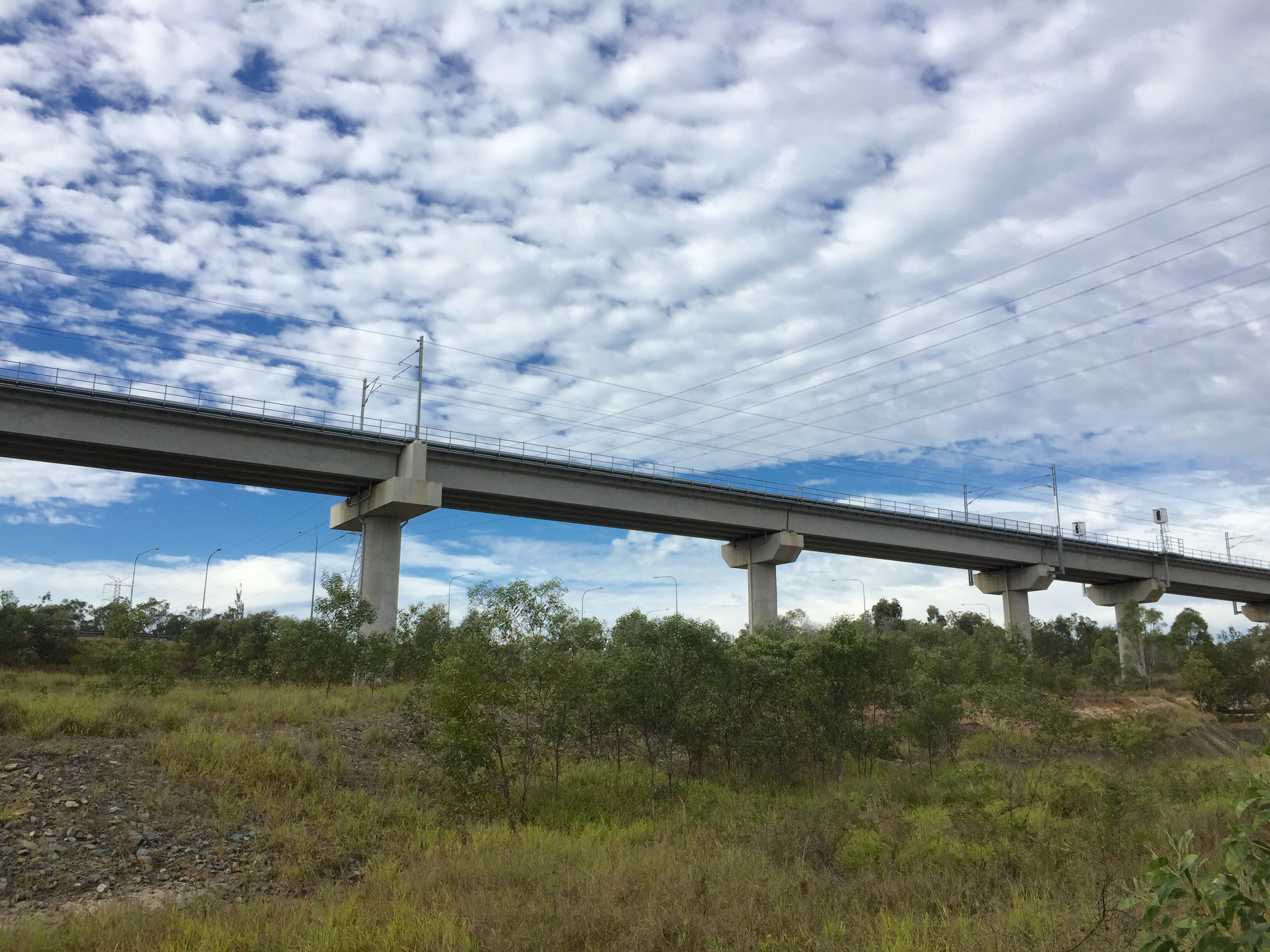
Springfield railway line viaduct

The centrepiece of Forest Lake is an $8.9 million, 10.9 hectare man-made recreational lake, with a perimeter of 2.7 kilometres (1.7 mi). $1.8 million was spent on the dam wall, outlet structure and boulevard embankment. It has an average depth of 2.6 metres with a 300 to 600 mm around the safety ledge, deepening to 4 metres in the centre. The volume of the lake is 310,000 cubic metres or 269 Olympic sized swimming pools. Surrounding the lake is 3.5 kilometres of pedestrian and cycleways and 8 hectares of adjacent parkland. It was completed and opened in 1994.

== History ==
Forest Lake is situated in the Yugarabul traditional Indigenous Australian country.

A homestead was built by Henry Farley in the late 1870s on a site that is now Homestead Park (27.6073°S 152.9577°E). It was a substantial building of two-stories and timber construction. In 1881, the homestead and surrounding property were purchased by Michael Durack. The surrounding area became part of "Archerfield Station". In the 1930s it was destroyed by fire, although it has been said that termites caused a great deal of damage to the structure beforehand.

During World War II, there was a command post of the Darra Ordnance Ammunition Depot in the area now Forest Lake. This depot was the largest ordnance depot in the South West Pacific Area. On 31 August 2005 the Richlands-Inala History Group erected an honour stone in Homestead Park, the site of the command post, commemorating the ammunition depot and the American army camps in Inala and Wacol nearby.

In 1990, construction of the master planned community commenced by Delfin. In 1991, Forest Lake was officially launched by the Premier of Queensland, Wayne Goss.

Forest Lake State School opened in January 1994. Forest Lake College (College Avenue Campus) opened in 1994.

By 1998, the suburb had 10,100 residents. Grand Avenue State School opened in 1 January 1999. and Forest Lake State High School in January 2001.

As the first Master Planned Community within the City of Brisbane, Forest Lake won numerous awards for its design. Delfin, the developer of Forest Lake, was taken over by Lendlease in 2001.

Forest Lake College (Alpine Place Campus) opened in 2002 and Mary McConnel School on 28 January 2003.

In 2011, the lake experienced a blue-green algae (cyanobacterial) bloom, causing some concern to local residents. A local councillor advised people to not enter the water due to the high toxicity levels from the algal bloom.

== Demographics ==
In the 2011 census, Forest Lake recorded a population of 22,426 people, 51.9% female and 48.1% male. The median age of the Forest Lake population was 33 years of age, 4 years below the Australian median. 61% of people living in Forest Lake were born in Australia, compared to the national average of 69.8%; the next most common countries of birth were New Zealand 7.9%, England 4.7%, Vietnam 3.1%, India 1.8%, South Africa 1.6%. 73.6% of people spoke only English at home; the next most popular languages were 5% Vietnamese, 1.6% Samoan, 1.4% Sinhalese, 1.3% Mandarin, 1.2% Hindi

In the 2016 census, Forest Lake had a population of 22,904 people, including the largest Sri Lankan Australian community of any suburb in Queensland, numbering 344 individuals and making up 1.5% of the suburb's population.

In the 2021 census, Forest Lake had a population of 22,676 people.

== Education ==
Forest Lake State School is a government primary (Prep–6) school for boys and girls at Kauri Place (27.6136°S 152.9589°E). In 2017, the school had an enrolment of 865 students with 69 teachers (59 full-time equivalent) and 38 non-teaching staff (26 full-time equivalent). It includes a special education program.

Grand Avenue State School is a government primary (Prep–6) school for boys and girls at the corner of Centennial Way and Grand Avenue (27.6260°S 152.9581°E). In 2017, the school had an enrolment of 1225 students with 90 teachers (78 full-time equivalent) and 46 non-teaching staff (30 full-time equivalent). It includes a special education program.

Forest Lake State High School is a government secondary (7–12) school for boys and girls at High Street (27.6245°S 152.9715°E). In 2017, the school had an enrolment of 1485 students with 121 teachers (117 full-time equivalent) and 57 non-teaching staff (43 full-time equivalent). It includes a special education program.

St John's Anglican College (formerly Forest Lake College) is a private primary (Prep–6) and secondary school (7–12) for boys and girls. It operates two campuses: a primary campus at Alpine Place (27.6125°S 152.9608°E) and a secondary campus at College Avenue (27.6216°S 152.9711°E). In 2017, the school had an enrolment of 927 students with 80 teachers (69 full-time equivalent) and 63 non-teaching staff (43 full-time equivalent).

== Amenities ==
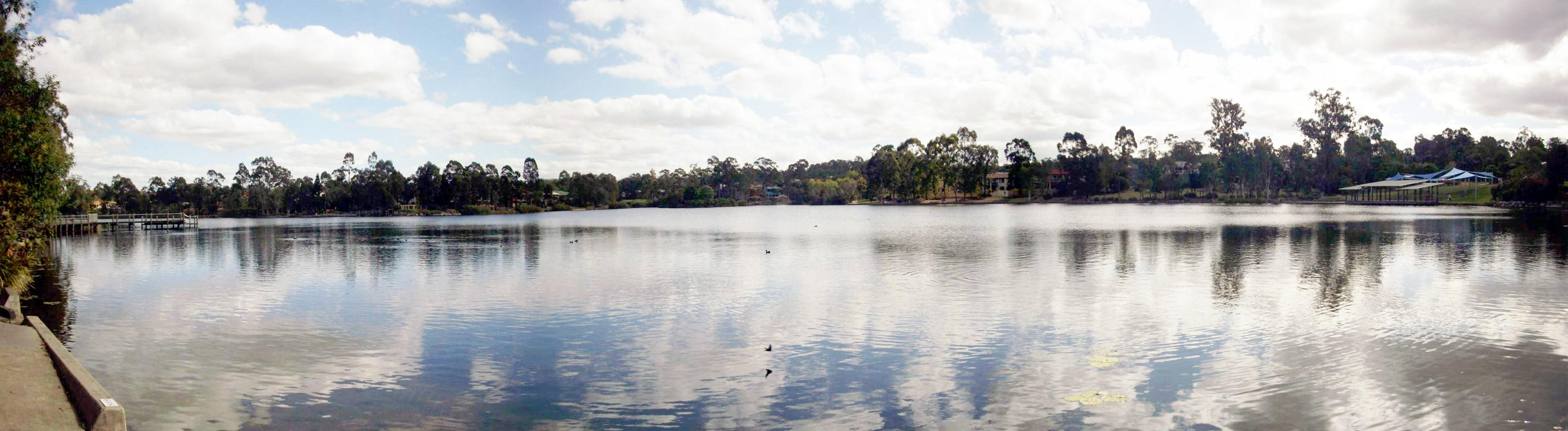
Panorama of Forest Lake

Forest Lake is serviced by a weekly visit of the Brisbane City Council's mobile library service at the Forest Lake Shopping Centre.

Forest Lake Samoan Church conduct their services on the cornern Corsair Avenue and Inala Avenue in Inala; it is part of the Wesleyan Methodist Church.
