= Ipswich Motorway =

Motorway in Queensland, Australia

Ipswich Motorway Queensland
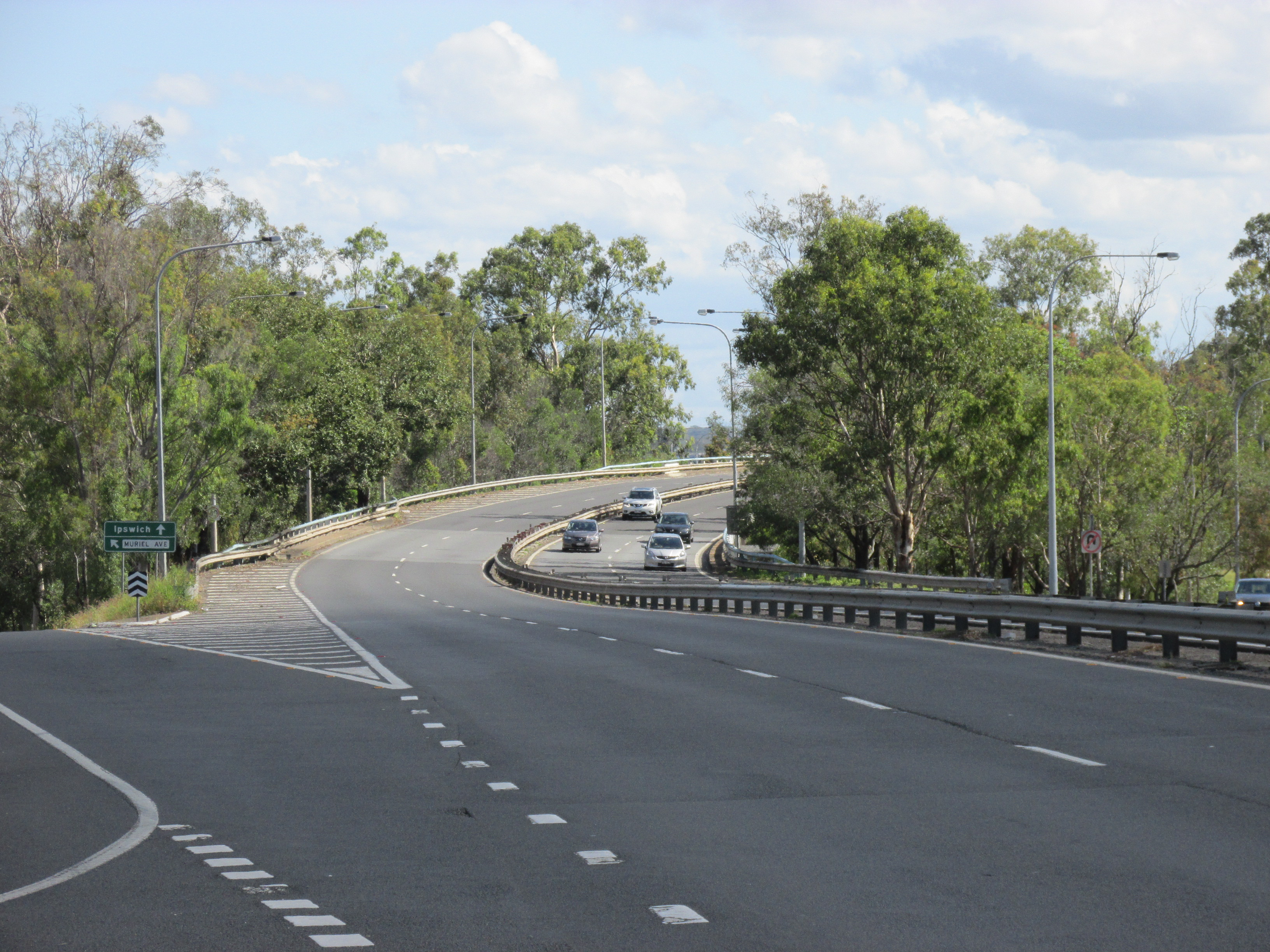
- Ipswich Motorway beginning at Moorooka, 2017

General information
- Type: Motorway
- Length: 21 km (13 mi)
- Route number(s): M2; (Warrego Highway to Logan Motorway); M7; (Logan Motorway to Ipswich Road)
- Former route number: Metroad 2; National Highway 15

Major junctions
- NE end: Ipswich Road; Rocklea, Brisbane
- Logan Motorway; Centenary Motorway; Granard Road
- SW end: Warrego Highway; Cunningham Highway; Riverview, Ipswich

Location(s)
- Major suburbs / towns: Oxley, Darra, Wacol, Gailes, Goodna

Highway system
- Highways in Australia; National Highway • Freeways in Australia; Highways in Queensland

The Ipswich Motorway (M7) is a major road that connects Brisbane and Ipswich in South East Queensland, Australia. It commences at the junction of Ipswich Road and Granard Road and proceeds through to the M2 Logan Motorway interchange. It is then signed M2 until the junction of the Warrego Highway and the Cunningham Highway.

It initially passes through the suburbs of Rocklea, Oxley and Darra in south west Brisbane before reaching the eastern suburbs of Ipswich such as Redbank Plains, Goodna and Riverview. The Motorway is directly connected to the M5 Centenary Motorway at Darra and the M2 Logan Motorway at Gailes. In 2008, it was estimated that 80,000 cars use the road daily. In late 2010, this figure had risen to close to 100,000 vehicles per day. In 2002, the morning peak traffic volume was greatest between 7:00 am and 8:00 am. By 2008, the morning peak traffic volume peaked between the hours of 5:00 am and 6:00 am.

This road consists of two separate state-controlled roads as defined by the Department of Transport and Main Roads (TMR). The part from Rocklea to Goodna is named Cunningham Arterial Road (number U16) and the other is named as part of the Cunningham Highway (number 17A). Road U16 is part of the state strategic network, and road 17A is part of the national network.

== Construction ==
The motorway was constructed in stages from 1988 to 1994:

- 1988 - Blunder Road/Oxley Road interchange completed in September at a cost of $12 million.
- 1989–1990 - Church Street interchange and Granard Road overpass.
- 1991–1992 - Progress Road/Wacol Station Road and Endeavour Road interchanges.
- 1993 - Acanthus Street/Harcourt Road, Rudd Street/Douglas Street, and Donaldson Road/Banting Street interchanges.
- 1994 - Centenary Highway interchange (elevated roundabout).

Following completion of the final interchange, the Ipswich Motorway was commissioned on 17 May 1994.

== Upgrade ==
In 2003, just 9 years after it was completed, planning for an upgrade of the entire motorway began. The road was identified in the South East Queensland Infrastructure Plan and Program as one requiring urgent attention. An upgrade was needed to improve safety and relieve traffic congestion.

An upgrade of the Granard Road interchange was the first project to be built. It was opened on 31 August 2006 by Federal Minister for Transport Jim Lloyd. Next was an upgrade to the section between Wacol and Goodna, including the rebuilding of the Logan Motorway interchange. Construction commenced in February 2007, and was completed in late 2009.

Widening of the motorway from four lanes to six lanes between Wacol and the Centenary Motorway at Darra was one of the Australian Labor Party's key 2007 federal election promises. The upgrade included the transformation of the Centenary Highway Interchange to a free-flowing multi level system interchange and work on adjoining service roads that aims to reduce traffic on the motorway by up to 20%. The Federal government has contributed a total of $3.1 billion for the upgrade. The Wacol to Darra section of the motorway was officially opened on 18 April 2010.

The eight kilometres upgrade of the Ipswich Motorway between Dinmore and Goodna was commenced in mid-2009. It was officially opened on 15 May 2012. The A$1.95 billion project funded by the Australian Government is delivered by the Origin Alliance consisting of the Department of Transport & Main Roads, Abigroup, Seymour Whyte, Fulton Hogan, SMEC and Parsons Brinckerhoff.

Construction of a 3km section between Granard Road, Rocklea and Oxley Road, Oxley, was commenced in 2017, and was completed in April 2021 at a cost of $400 million.

Widening of the final section, between the Centenary Motorway and Oxley Road, is still in the planning stages.

== Interchanges ==
Exit numbers continue from the interchange Cunningham Highway/Centenary Highway. Exit numbers are (from northern terminus):

- 22
- 23
- 24
- 25
- 26
- 27
- 28
- 29
- 30
- 31
- 32

Exit numbers continue along Cunningham Highway.

LGA	Location	km	mi	Destinations	Notes
Brisbane	Rocklea	0	0.0	Ipswich Road (A7) north / Granard Road (Metroad 2) east – Brisbane CBD, Sunshine Coast, Gold Coast, Brisbane Airport	North–eastern terminus: continues as Ipswich Road
Brisbane	Rocklea	1	0.62	Suscatand Street	North–eastbound exit and entrance
Brisbane	Rocklea	1	0.62	Randolph Street	South–westbound entrance and exit
Brisbane	Oxley	3	1.9	Oxley Road (State Route 35) north / Blunder Road (State Route 35) south – Oxley, Inala	Access to frontage roads
Brisbane	Oxley	4	2.5	Douglas Street north / Rudd Street south – Inala	
Brisbane	Darra	5	3.1	Harcourt Road north / Acanthus Street south – Richlands, Darra	South–westbound exit and entrance via frontage road
Brisbane	Darra	6.5	4.0	Centenary Motorway (M5) – Jindalee, Brisbane, Springfield, Gold Coast	No north–eastbound exit to M5 southbound, no south–westbound entrance from M5 northbound
Brisbane	Wacol	9	5.6	Progress Road (State Route 30) east / Wacol Station Road west – Inala, Woodridge, Wacol	
Brisbane	Wacol	10.5	6.5	Brisbane Road – Goodna, Redbank Plains, to Logan Motorway and Queen Street	South–westbound exit only
Brisbane–Ipswich boundary	Wacol–Gailes boundary	11	6.8	Logan Motorway – Logan, Gold Coast, Brisbane Airport	Route transition: M7 north–eastbound, M2 south–westbound; north–eastbound exit and south-westbound entrance only
Ipswich	Goodna	13	8.1	Church Street (State Route 61) – north to Woogaroo Street; south to Brisbane Road, Queen Street (State Route 61), Mill Street, Smiths Road	No south–westbound exit; south–westbound entrance via Brisbane Road
Ipswich	Redbank	16	9.9	Mine Street north / Collingwood Drive south / Francis Street east – Collingwood Park, Redbank	North–eastbound entrance via Francis Street
Ipswich	Riverview	19	12	Warrego Highway (M2) south-west / Cunningham Highway (M15) north–west – Esk, Toowoomba, Warwick	South–western terminus: continues as Cunningham Highway; partial Y interchange: no access between Warrego and Cunningham highways
Incomplete access; Route transition

== See also ==
- Freeways in Australia
- Freeways in Brisbane
- Road transport in Brisbane
