= Redbank railway station =

Railway station in Queensland, Australia

Redbank
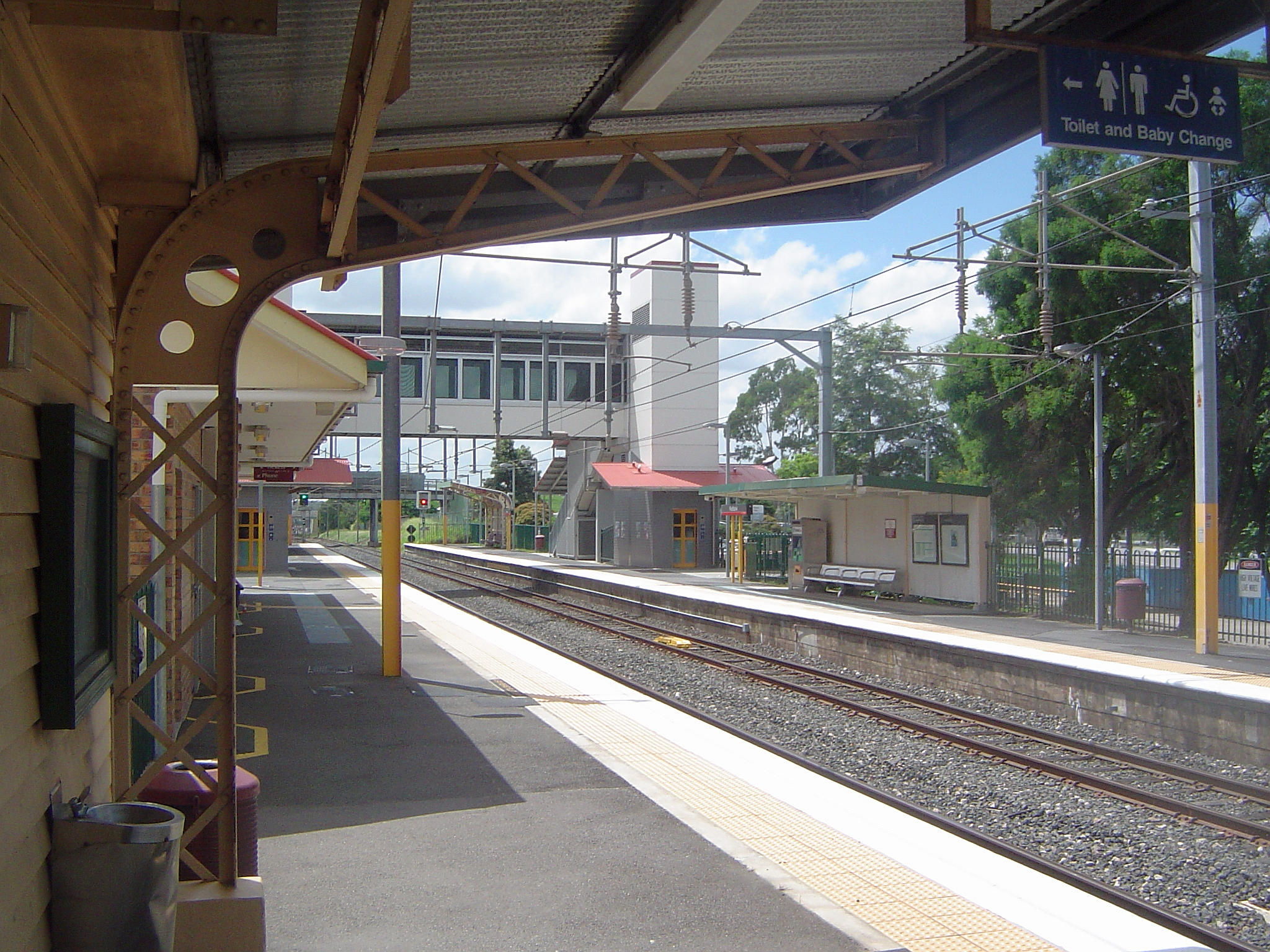
- Eastbound view from Platform 2 in September 2012

General information
- Location: Corner Brisbane Tce & Weedman St, Redbank
- Coordinates: 27°35′58″S 152°52′20″E
- Elevation: 22 m (72 ft)
- Owner: Queensland Rail
- Operator: Queensland Rail
- Line: T1 Ipswich/Rosewood
- Distance: 26.84 kilometres from Central
- Platforms: 2 side
- Tracks: 2

Construction
- Structure type: Ground
- Parking: 237
- Accessible: Yes

Other information
- Status: Staffed
- Station code: 600333 (platform 1); 600334 (platform 2)
- Fare zone: Zone 2/3
- Website: Translink

History
- Opened: 1874; 152 years ago

Services
Preceding station	Queensland Rail	Following station
Goodna towards Caboolture, Nambour or Gympie North	Ipswich/Rosewood line	Riverview towards Ipswich or Rosewood
Location

Redbank is a railway station operated by Queensland Rail on the Ipswich/Rosewood line. It opened in 1874 and serves the Ipswich suburbs of Redbank and Collingwood Park. It is a ground level station, featuring two side platforms.

== History ==
The station features a pedestrian footbridge with stairs and elevators to both platforms, ticket office, bicycle enclosure, and a park and ride facility on each side of the station with 237 car spaces.

Redbank station is beside the Redbank Railway Workshops, operated by Progress Rail, which repair and maintain diesel and electric locomotives and wagons at the facility. Near the station used to be coal train wagon storage roads used for the Jondaryan, Macalister and Columboola coal mines, west of Toowoomba, however much of the storage roads and stabling yards have been removed to make way for the Redbank Motorway Estate, a logistics, and manufacturing development.

In May 2012, three stabling sidings were opened to the west of the station.

== Platforms and services ==
Redbank is served by trains operating to and from Ipswich and Rosewood. Most city-bound services run to Caboolture and Nambour, with some morning peak trains terminating at Bowen Hills. Some afternoon inbound services on weekdays run to Kippa-Ring. Redbank is 17 minutes from Ipswich Station and 41 minutes on an all-stops train from Central.

Redbank platform arrangement
Platform	Line	Destination	Notes
1	T1 Ipswich/Rosewood	Ipswich or Rosewood	
2	T1 Ipswich/Rosewood	Roma Street (to Caboolture and Nambour/Gympie North lines)	

== Transport links ==
Westside Bus Company operate three bus routes from or via Redbank station:

- 500: Goodna station to Riverlink Shopping Centre via Riverview
- 522: Redbank station to Springfield station via Collingwood Park
- 526: Redbank station to Springfield Central via Redbank Plains
