= Westside Bus Company =

Australian bus service operator

Bus Queensland
- Parent: Pulitano Group
- Service area: Ipswich
- Service type: Bus operator
- Routes: 16
- Hubs: Riverlink Shopping Centre; Orion Springfield
- Stations: Booval; Gailes; Goodna; Ipswich; Redbank; Springfield; Springfield Central; Thomas Street
- Depots: Redbank
- Fleet: 104 (September 2021)
- Website: www.busqld.com.au

Westside Bus Company is an Australian operator of bus services in the western suburbs of Brisbane. It operates 16 services under contract to the Government of Queensland under the Translink banner.

== History ==
In 1998, the Pulitano Group purchased Westside Bus Company from the Doyle family. In January 2000 the Heritage City Sunbus business was purchased from Harry Blundred and in 2002 the Ipswich-based school services of Stagecoach. Westside has been part of the Bus Queensland group since at least 2010. As at February 2019 routes are operated under the Bus Queensland name.

As of September 2021, the fleet consisted of 104 buses.

== See also ==
- Bus Queensland Toowoomba
