= Camira =

Camira may refer to:

== Australia ==
- Holden Camira car
- Camira, Queensland, a suburb
- MV Camira, former ship

== United Kingdom ==
- Camira Fabrics, a global textile manufacturer in England
