= Ellen Grove =

- Suburb
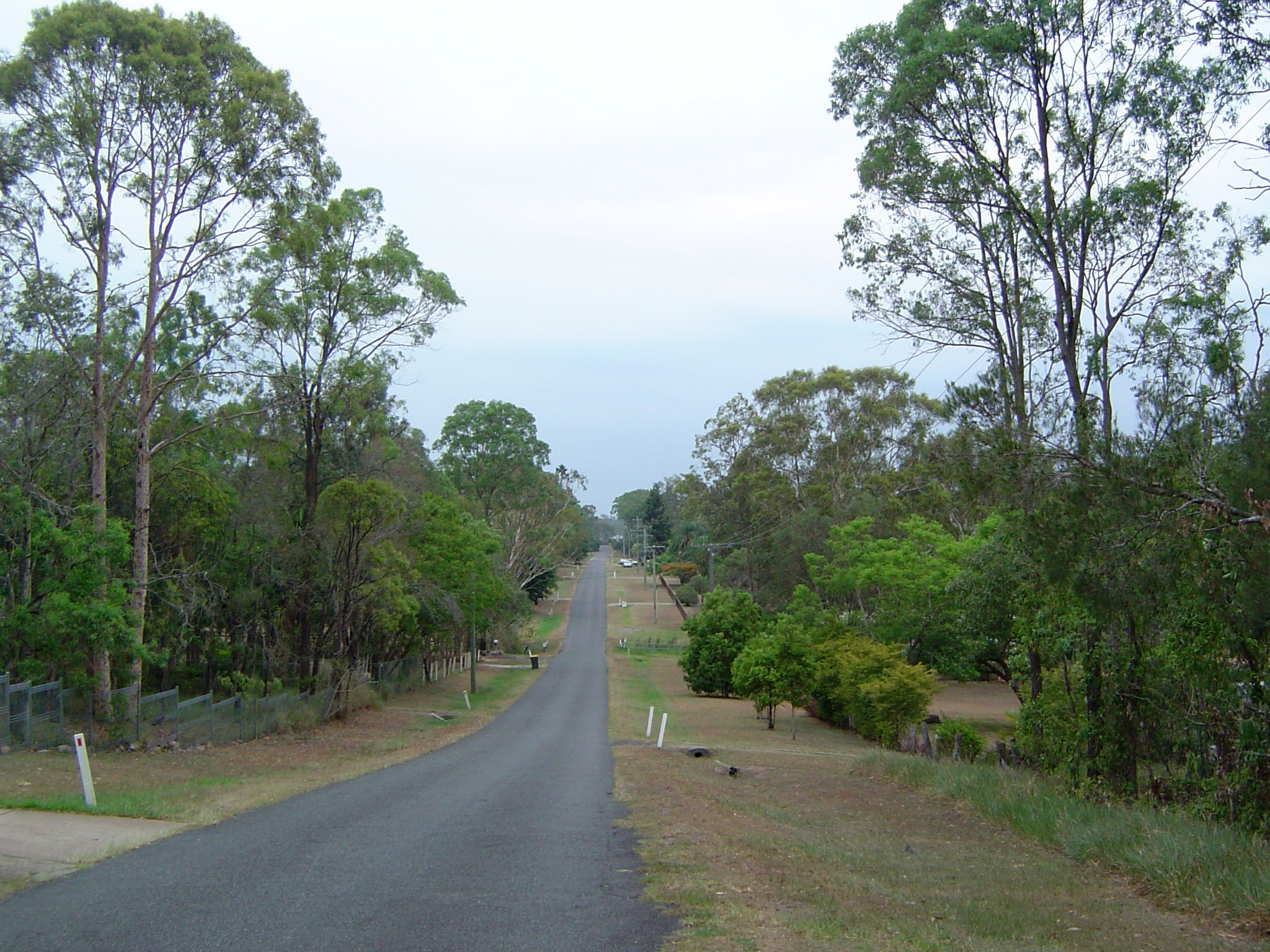
- Lovat Street, Ellen Grove

- Interactive map of Ellen Grove
- Coordinates: 27.6138°S 152.9422°E
- Country: Australia
- State: Queensland
- City: Brisbane
- LGA: City of Brisbane (Jamboree Ward)
- Location: 23.1 km (14.4 mi) E of Ipswich; 23.9 km (14.9 mi) SW of Brisbane CBD
- Established: 1962

Government
  - State electorate: Inala
  - Federal division: Oxley

Area
  - Total: 3.4 km^{2} (1.3 sq mi)

Population
  - Total: 3,586 (2021 census)
  - Density: 1,055/km^{2} (2,730/sq mi)
- Time zone: UTC+10:00 (AEST)
- Postcode: 4078
Suburbs around Ellen Grove
Gailes	Wacol	Forest Lake
Gailes	Ellen Grove	Forest Lake
Carole Park	Carole Park	Forest Lake

Ellen Grove is an outer south-western suburb in the City of Brisbane, Queensland, Australia. In the 2021 census, Ellen Grove had a population of 3,586 people.

== Geography ==
The southern boundary of the suburb is partially marked by the Logan Motorway. The Centenary Highway passes through the suburb from north to south. The Richlands and Inala reservoirs were built in the suburb to increase water pressure for residents in the surrounding suburbs.

== History ==
Ellen Grove was subdivided for housing around 1959, with the name of the suburb gazetted in 1962 due to lobbying from the Ellen Grove Progress Association. The subdivisions were between 2 and 4 acres (0.81 and 1.62 ha) in area with no services provided.

The owner of the original land was R.P. Spinks who had a daughter named Ellen Dabing. She often played with local Aboriginals in a grove of trees along Bullockhead Creek. The area became known as Ellen's Grove.

A portion of the suburb of Carole Park had since been annexed to form part of the suburb of Ellen Grove as part of a Brisbane City Council and Ipswich City Council redistribution assignment, and in 2009, the suburb was extended both to the north and south, increasing the population significantly.

== Demographics ==
In the 2011 census, Ellen Grove recorded a population of 2,529 people, 51% female and 49% male. The median age of the Ellen Grove population was 28 years of age, 9 years below the Australian median. 55.9% of people living in Ellen Grove were born in Australia, compared to the national average of 69.8%; the next most common countries of birth were New Zealand 5.5%, Vietnam 5.4%, Samoa 2.9%, England 2.1%, Philippines 1.2%. 59.3% of people spoke only English at home; the next most popular languages were 9.8% Vietnamese, 5.3% Samoan, 1% Kirundi (Rundi), 1% Mandarin, 0.9% Arabic.

In the 2016 census, Ellen Grove had a population of 2,906 people.

In the 2021 census, Ellen Grove had a population of 3,586 people.

== Education ==
There are no schools in Ellen Grove. The nearest government primary schools are Carole Park State School in neighbouring Wacol to the north, Forest Lake State School in neighbouring Forest Lake to the north-east, and Grand Avenue State School in neighbouring Forest Lake to the south-east. The nearest government secondary school is Forest Lake State High School in neighbouring Forest Lake to the east.

== Facilities ==
Carole Park Wastewater Treatment Plant is a sewage treatment plant in the north-west of the suburb (27.6089°S 152.9281°E). It releases its effluent into the Brisbane River, 500 metres (1,600 ft) downstream of its confluence with Woogaroo Creek.

== Amenities ==
The suburb contains a small shopping centre at 255 Waterford Road (27.6085°S 152.9342°E). Ellen Grove Post Office is part of this centre.

Ellen Grove is serviced by a fortnightly visit of the Brisbane City Council's mobile library service at the Carole Park State School, 260 Waterford Road, Wacol (27.6080°S 152.9336°E).

Despite the name, Forest Lake Uniting Church is at 528 Waterford Road in Ellen Grove (27.6128°S 152.9538°E).

Elim Gospel Church of Australasia is at 8 Julie Road (27.6133°S 152.9350°E).

== Transport ==
Provisions have been made for the proposed Ellen Grove railway station on the Springfield line, which passes through Ellen Grove.
