= Goodna, Queensland =

Goodna
- Suburb
- Goodna Shopping Centre

- Interactive map of Goodna
- Coordinates: 27.6088°S 152.8955°E
- Country: Australia
- State: Queensland
- City: Ipswich
- LGA: City of Ipswich
- Location: 13.7 km (8.5 mi) E of Ipswich CBD; 28.7 km (17.8 mi) SW of Brisbane CBD
- Established: 1856

Government
  - State electorates: Bundamba; Inala
  - Federal division: Oxley

Area
  - Total: 7.9 km^{2} (3.1 sq mi)

Population
  - Total: 10,391 (2021 census)
  - Density: 1,315/km^{2} (3,407/sq mi)
- Time zone: UTC+10:00 (AEST)
- Postcode: 4300
Suburbs around Goodna
Redbank	Moggill	Wacol
Redbank	Goodna	Gailes
Redbank	Bellbird Park	Camira

Goodna is a suburb on the eastern edge of the City of Ipswich in Queensland, Australia. In the 2021 census, Goodna had a population of 10,391 people.

== Geography ==
View of Brisbane River from Richardson Park in Goodna

Goodna is 20 kilometres (12 mi) from the Brisbane central business district, being just outside the Brisbane City Council area. Located as a centre point between Brisbane and Ipswich, it was designated by the Queensland Government in the SEQ Plan as a major activity centre, a transport oriented development centre and as an economic activity centre.

The Brisbane River runs to the north of Goodna. Goodna Boat Ramp is one of the only boat ramps on the Brisbane River and is part of the Brisbane River Canoe Trail. There are extensive old jacaranda, poinciana, hoop pine and mango trees throughout the area. Parks are widespread with over 14 individual parks to be found and free electric barbecue facilities at the major ones. Names of some of the major parks include: Evan Marginson Sportsground, Richardson Park, Leslie Park, Kippen Park, Norma Mulvihill Park, Baines Meaney and Seymour Park. Fifty percent of The Pan Pacific Peace Gardens is also situated within Goodna. Wildlife is restricted with ongoing development, however possums and on a rare occasion koalas have also been spotted and kangaroos are numerous, especially near the golf courses.

Goodna Shopping Centre (also known as St Ives) is a major shopping centre, an easy walk to the Goodna train station (207 metres (679 ft) direct distance).

Many of the original central street names in Goodna originated from English kings, princes, and queens such as William, Albert, James and George.

== History ==
Goodna is situated in the Ugarapul traditional Aboriginal country. The Ugarapul people, custodians within the traditional Ugarapul country, spoke a dialect of the Ugarapul language group that continues their culture today.

In 1823 John Oxley led an exploration party who were the first Europeans to visit the area. The area had extensive beds of sandstone. In 1826 Patrick Logan established the Woogaroo Quarry to provide building materials for the Moreton Bay penal colony.

The district was known as Woogaroo, derived from Woogaroo Creek, which in turn appears on the 1840 map of Moreton Bay District prepared by surveyor Robert Dixon. The name Woogaroo is derived from Yuggera language, Ugarapul dialect, indicating shady or cool. The name Goodna superseded the original name, Woogaroo, in 1865.

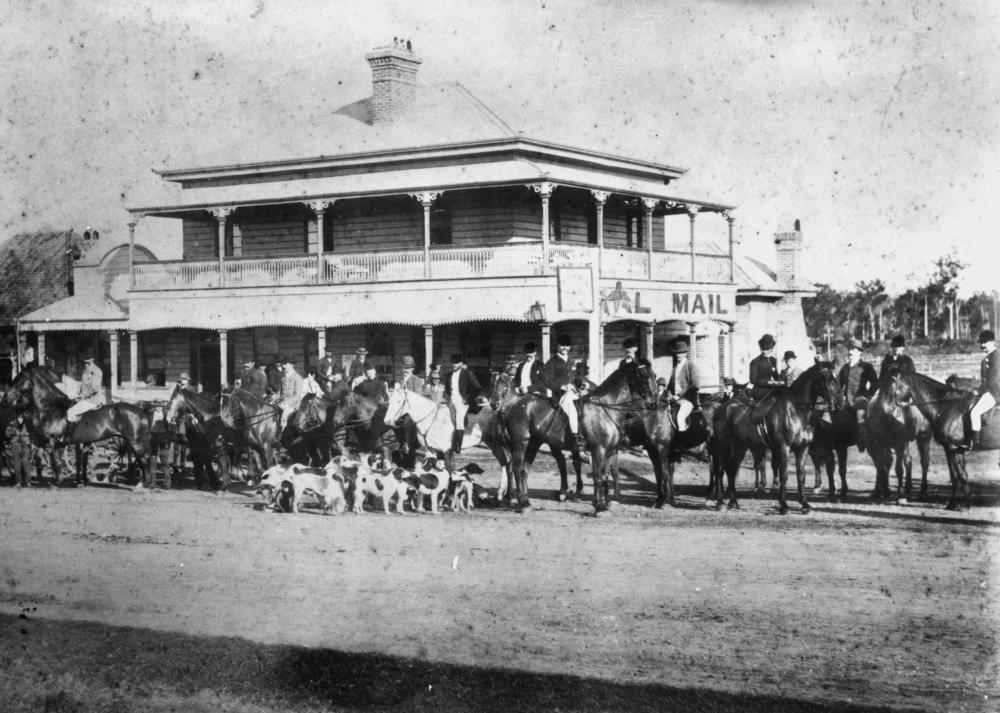
Ready for the hunt, c. 1892 Goodna Royal Mail Hotel

As early as 1841 there was a sheep run called Woogaroo Station belonging to H.S.Russell and Dr. Stephen Simpson. Simpson was the lands commissioner and magistrate for the Moreton Bay district, and lived in a slab hut while he farmed on the riverbank near the mouth of Woogaroo Creek. As the main road intersected with the track from Coopers Plains and the river, it was a strategic location for Simpson.

In 1851–1852 Simpson purchased 2,000 acres (8 km^{2}) of land, including 640 acres (2.6 km^{2}) on Wolston Creek. Other well known pioneers settled or purchased land in the Goodna area: James Holmes arrived in 1851 and established himself as a grazier; Charles Pitt married Thomas Grenier's daughter Mary in 1855 and grew cotton and maize at Redbank Plains. According to "Aldines History of Queensland" Pitt was the second to grow cotton in that area and received £400 from the New South Wales Government (the establishment of Queensland did not occur until 1859). Pitt was also a JP and later on the Purga Divisional Board and involved in the beginnings of the Redbank School.

"Penhelyg" Queenslander in William St Goodna built in 1896

Historically Goodna was a farming community, primarily in sugar, cotton, livestock (sheep and cattle), and also had a large local timber industry. Large amounts of timber were taken by bullock teams to the Goodna wharf and shipped to Ipswich and Brisbane.

Further settlement took place after Goodna was proclaimed a village in 1856. In the following year Joseph and Ellen (née Thompson) Broad built a store on the site, and sold the store later to Edwin Pitt, son of Charles and Mary Pitt. Edwin and his wife Cecilia (née Thompson sister of Ellen Broad) ran the store as a mixed business and Cecilia was the postmistress (see Aldines). They survived the 1893 Brisbane flood but a little later built Pitt's Hotel Cecil on the store site. It was later burnt down and the RSL is now on that site. Edwin and Cecilia's daughter Zora Brenda Pitt grew up and learnt to ride in Goodna and she became Royal National Show champion woman rider in the early 1900s.The cemetery opened in 1859.

Harriet Holmes bought 33 acres (130,000 m^{2}) in 1860; and Joshua Jeays, later Mayor of Brisbane, bought 40 acres (160,000 m^{2}) in the next year.

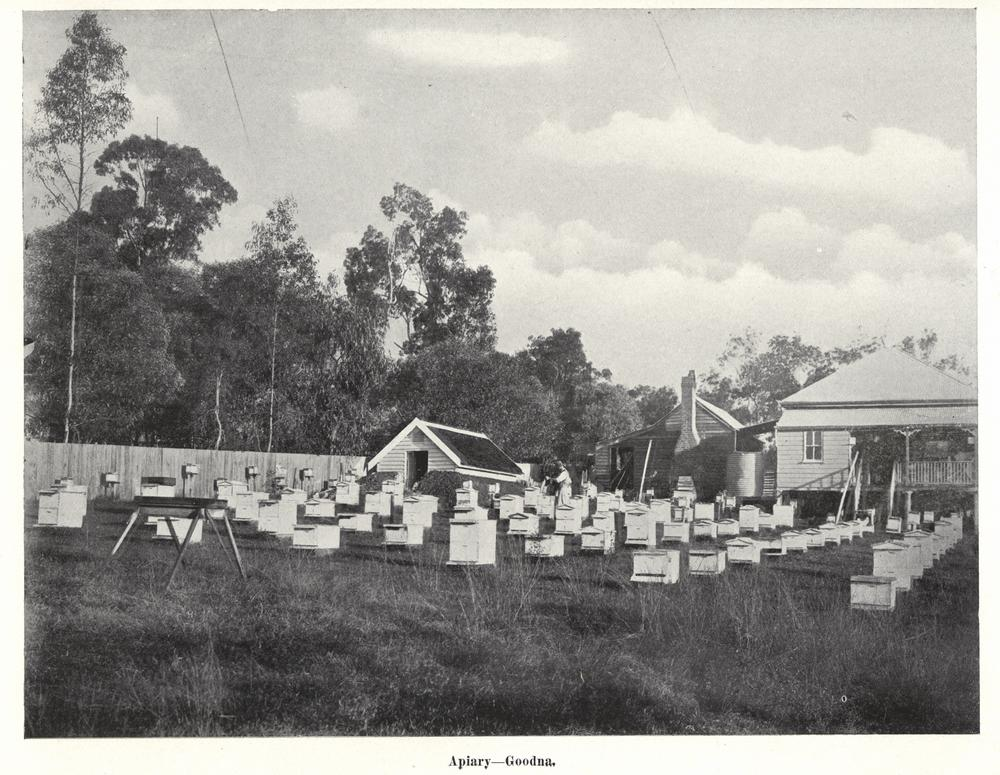
Apiary at Goodna, c. 1913

By 1863 there was a small run to Holmes Inn, where Harriet Holmes was postmistress. The Congregational Church was also opened in 1863. It was built by Mr ES Thomas who was also the lay preacher. Mr Thomas was an Ipswich Councillor and the local JP. As a JP he also filled the role of acting magistrate on occasions. He built the now heritage-listed house at 43 William Street and owned the adjacent general store and bakery. Thomas originally operated a general store in Brisbane Road but this was flooded in 1893. They had to move their best things into the top floor of the nearby hotel.

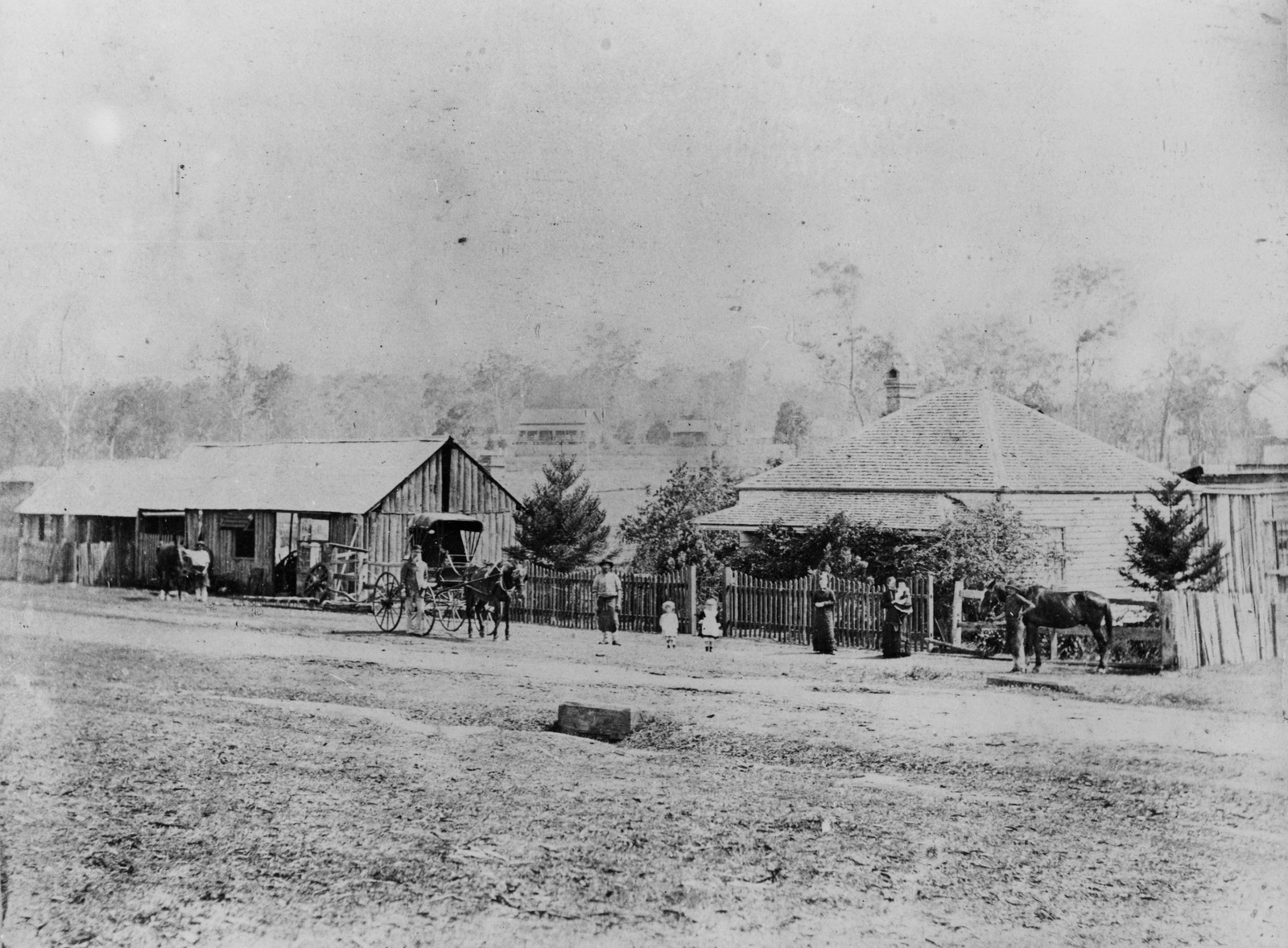
Early streetscape of Brisbane Terrace, Goodna, showing the transport and residents of the area (Law family residence), c. 1870

There was one acting police sergeant and a constable by 1868. W. Law established himself as a blacksmith in 1870.

The first school in Goodna was the Goodna State School which opened on 1 February 1870. By 1874 it had 175 pupils. A pre-school was added in 1975.

On Sunday 16 October 1870 a Primitive Methodist Church was opened.

Goodna Baptist Church opened on 31 December 1871.

On 30 January 1873 the ceremony of "turning the first sod" for the first rail link between Ipswich and Brisbane took place at Goodna. Two thousand people attended the event, most arriving by paddle steamer. To officially start the work, the Queensland Governor George Phipps, 2nd Marquess of Normanby, used a solid silver spade to dig a small piece of earth and place it in a wheelbarrow. Cobb and Co coaches stopped at Goodna on their way to and from Brisbane (their only other stops were Oxley and Rocklea). This ended after the railway link was completed in 1875.

The foundation stone of St Patrick's Catholic Church had been laid in 1880 by Bishop James Quinn and the church opened in the following year. It was later renamed St Francis Xavier Catholic Church.

Daniel Jones built the first sawmill in 1884, which was located below the Catholic Church/School grounds in the paddock that reached from Mill Street to Alice Street (known by locals as "the mill paddock"). In the smaller paddock immediately behind the Presbyterian Church and Manse stood the wooden "Honey Shed" used by Daniel's brother Harry in conjunction with his apiary. By World War II this use had been discontinued and the site was used by a group of CWA ladies who made camouflage nets for the war effort. The site was also used at one time by the Goodna Scout Group.

By 1888 the population of Goodna was 500, and there were three friendly societies, the Oddfellows, Loyal Rose of Denmark and Good Templars.

St Patrick's Primary School was established on 3 July 1910 by the Sisters of Mercy, whose convent opened in 1911. Circa 1924 it was renamed St Francis Xavier's School.

The Diggers Rest on the corner of Queen and Church Streets is the Goodna War Memorial and was dedicated in September 1921.

Goodna Special School opened on 1 August 1975.

Westside Christian College opened its Stuart Street campus on 1 February 1977.

Westside Christian College opened its Alice Street Campus in 2002.

Goodna celebrated its 150-year anniversary in 2006.

The 2009 Goodna Town Plan introduced buildings up to 12 stories in the main shopping centre area.

In October 2012, Goodna was the first Brisbane/Ipswich suburb to receive the NBN (National Broadband Network) providing fast broadband services.

== Demographics ==
In the 2016 census, Goodna had a population of 10,461 people. Aboriginal and Torres Strait Islander people made up 5.7% of the population. 54.2% of people were born in Australia. The next most common countries of birth were New Zealand 9.1%, Samoa 3.4%, Vietnam 2.9%, England 2.3% and Philippines 2.2%. 60.1% of people spoke only English at home. Other languages spoken at home included Samoan 7.7%, Vietnamese 4.6%, Tagalog 1.3%, Swahili 1.3% and Spanish 1.2%. The most common responses for religion were No Religion 25.5% and Catholic 18.3%. The median age of the Goodna population is 30 years of age, 8 years below the Australian median. The unemployment rate was 14.3%, compared to the Australian average of 6.9%. In the 2021 census, Goodna had a population of 10,391 people.

== Heritage listings ==
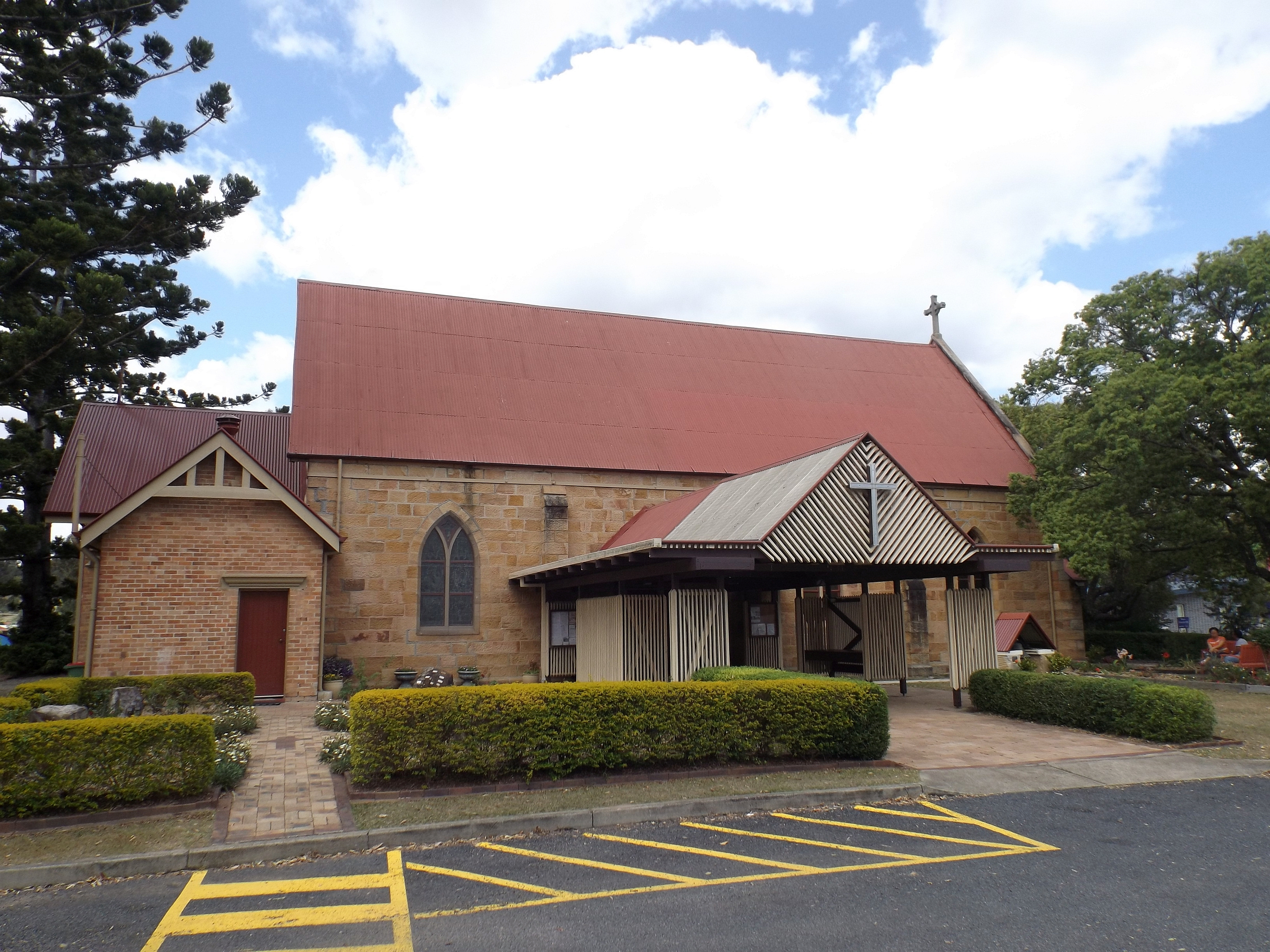
St Francis Xavier Church, 2015

Goodna retains significant elements of its heritage and has a number of heritage-listed sites, including

- Church Street: St Francis Xavier Church

== Amenities, facilities and services ==
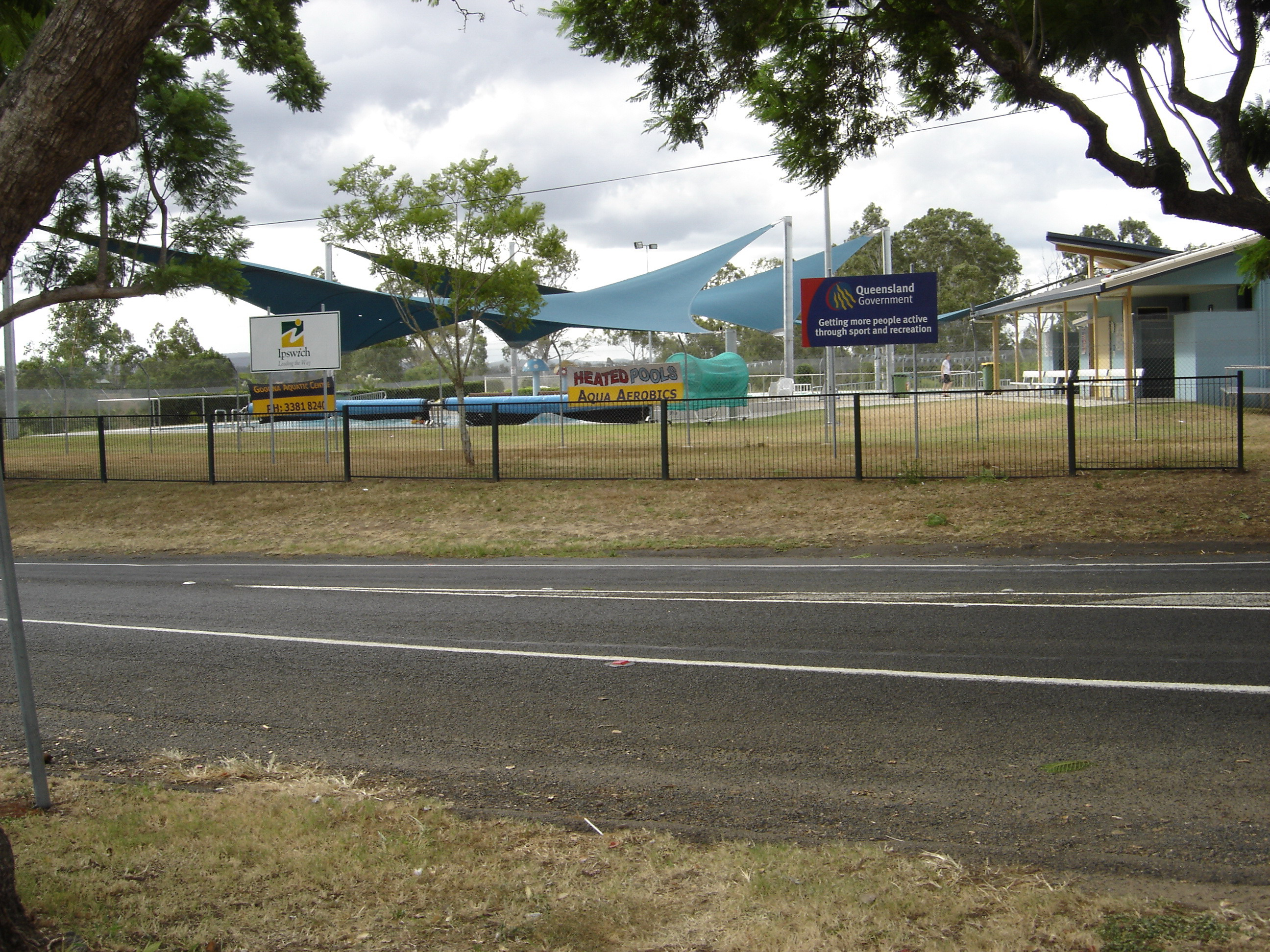
Goodna Aquatic Centre

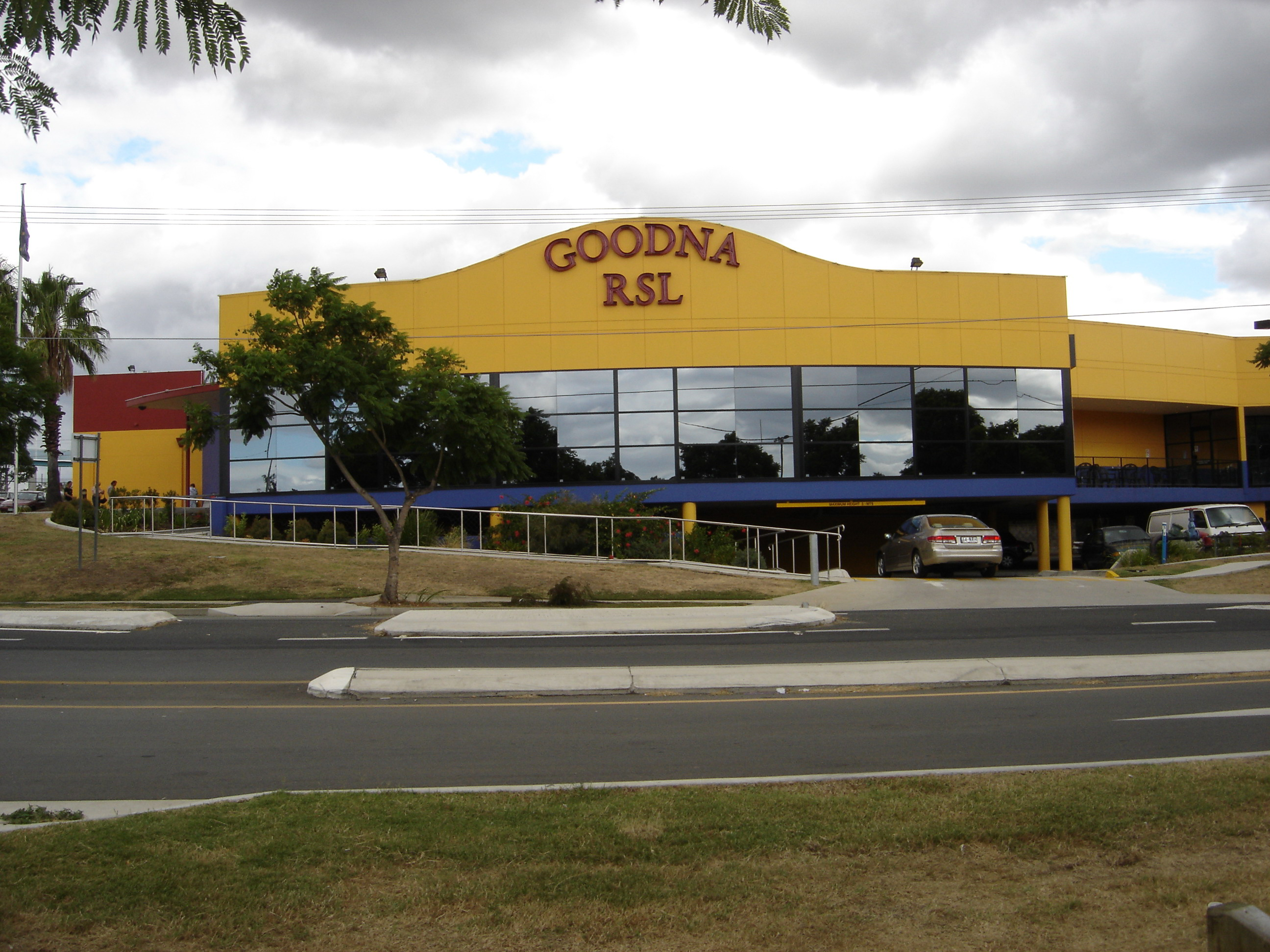
Goodna RSL

A wide range of established amenities, facilities, and services are to be found close to the Goodna Shopping Centre and the Goodna train station. Amongst these are a range of government services, large range of medical services, large range of financial services, Woolworths, Goodna Neighbourhood House, diverse range of sporting clubs, the Goodna Aquatic Centre, Woogaroo Swim Club, Brisbane River Tce retirement village, Tully Lodge retirement village, Oak Trees retirement village, Goodna Little Athletics, Goodna Rugby League Football Club, Western Spirit Football Club, Goodna Lawn Bowls Club, Goodna Netball Association, Goodna and Districts Gymnastics Club Inc, Goodna Cultural and Arts Centre, Jacaranda 2000 Toastmasters Club (Goodna), as well as local Goodna Scout Group, which was founded in 1969, celebrating its 40-year anniversary in 2009 and Girl Guide groups amongst others.

Goodna Uniting Church is at 13 William Street (corner of Smith Street, 27.6086°S 152.8950°E). It is part of the Bremer Brisbane Presbytery of the Uniting Church in Australia. It was formerly known as St Ives Goodna Uniting Church. The Goodna Samoan congregation also meets at the church.House of Hope Church conduct their services at 33 Queen Street (27.6119°S 152.8969°E); it is part of the Wesleyan Methodist Church.Oxley Samoan Church meets at Goodna State School at 1 Albert Street (27.6059°S 152.8933°E). It is part of the Wesleyan Methodist Church of Australia.

== Education ==
Goodna State School is a government primary (Prep–6) school for boys and girls at 1 Albert Street (27.6069°S 152.8936°E). In 2017, the school had an enrolment of 768 students with 54 teachers (51 full-time equivalent) and 51 non-teaching staff (31 full-time equivalent). It includes a special education program.St Francis Xavier's School is a Catholic primary (Prep–6) school for boys and girls at 6 Church Street (27.6110°S 152.8990°E). In 2017, the school had an enrolment of 493 students with 34 teachers (31 full-time equivalent) and 15 non-teaching staff (10 full-time equivalent).

Westside Christian College is a private primary (Prep–6) facility of Westside Christian College at 65 Stuart Street for boys and girls at 110 Stuart Street (27.6122°S 152.8881°E). In 2017, the school had an enrolment of 976 students with 89 teachers (71 full-time equivalent) and 117 non-teaching staff (56 full-time equivalent).

Goodna Special School is a special primary and secondary (Prep–12) school for boys and girls at 65 Queen Street (27.6152°S 152.8939°E). In 2017, the school had an enrolment of 134 students with 31 teachers (29 full-time equivalent) and 43 non-teaching staff (25 full-time equivalent).

Westside Christian College is a private secondary (7–12) school for boys and girls at 65 Stuart Street (27.6106°S 152.8873°E). In 2017, the school had an enrolment of 976 students with 89 teachers (71 full-time equivalent) and 117 non-teaching staff (56 full-time equivalent).

Queensland Pathways State College at 45 Queen Street (27.6128°S 152.8957°E) is a secondary (10–12) campus of Queensland Pathways State College (headquartered at Coorparoo).

Goodna is also home to a campus of The Bremer Institute of TAFE.

== Events ==
=== Goodna Jacaranda Festival ===
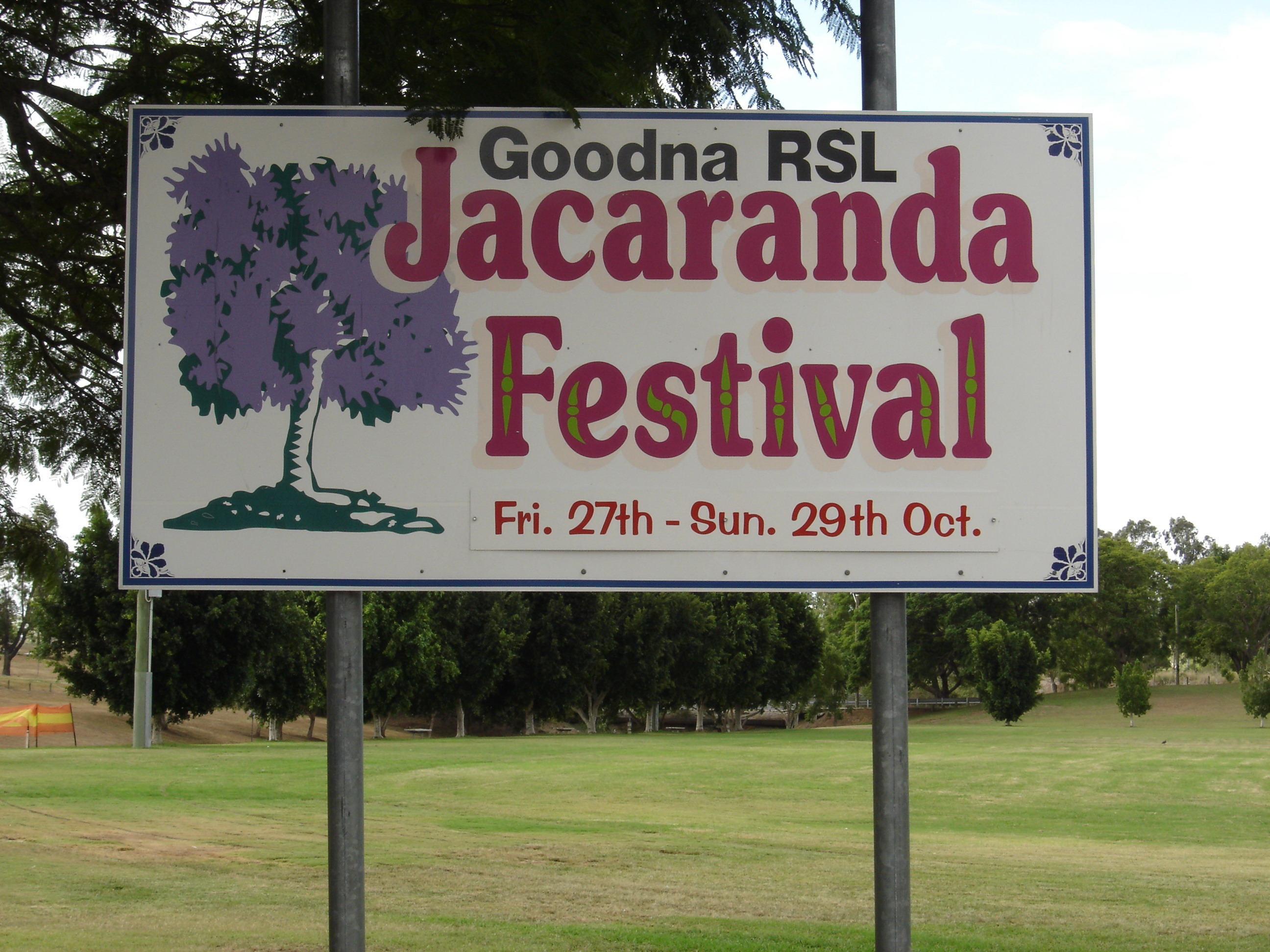
Goodna Jacaranda Festival sign

Goodna is renowned for its yearly Jacaranda Festival held towards the end of October. This is held when the Jacaranda trees are flowering. In excess of 10,000 people attend the Jacaranda Festival annually, which has been run since 1968. The festival is held in Evan Marginson Park near Goodna train station.

=== Mall 2 Mall Bike Ride ===
This is an integral part of the annual Ipswich Festival which is held each April. Attracting 1,000 riders it was started in 2002. It was initiated by Bernie Ripoll, the local federal member (Federal Member for Oxley) who has his office in Goodna. Goodna is the major rest point for this event and it is possible to join the event there. This event starts in the Brisbane Mall and finishes in the heart of Ipswich, covering more than 50 kilometres (31 mi) and passing through 27 western Brisbane and Ipswich suburbs. It raises funds for the Ipswich Hospital Foundation and the Royal Children's Hospital Foundation.

== Transport ==
The Goodna train station was opened in 1875. Feeder bus services are operated by the Westside Bus Company which carry commuters from surrounding suburbs to and from the Goodna train station.

== Politics ==
Goodna is located within the federal electorate of Oxley. Milton Dick represents the electorate of Oxley in the House of Representatives. On a state basis it is in the state electoral district of Bundamba and is represented by Lance McCallum.
