= Ellen Grove railway station =

Railway station in Queensland, Australia

Ellen Grove

General information
- Location: Considine Street, Ellen Grove
- Coordinates: 27.613°S 152.942°E
- Line: Springfield

Services
Preceding station	Queensland Rail	Following station
Richlands towards Kippa Ring via Roma Street	Springfield line	Springfield towards Springfield Central
Location

Ellen Grove railway station is a proposed railway station on the Springfield line in Queensland, Australia. It would serve the Brisbane suburb of Ellen Grove and would be located between Richlands and Springfield stations.

When the Springfield line was built in 2013, provision was made for the station, but to date no concrete plans exist to build it.
