= Carole Park, Queensland =

Carole Park
- Suburb
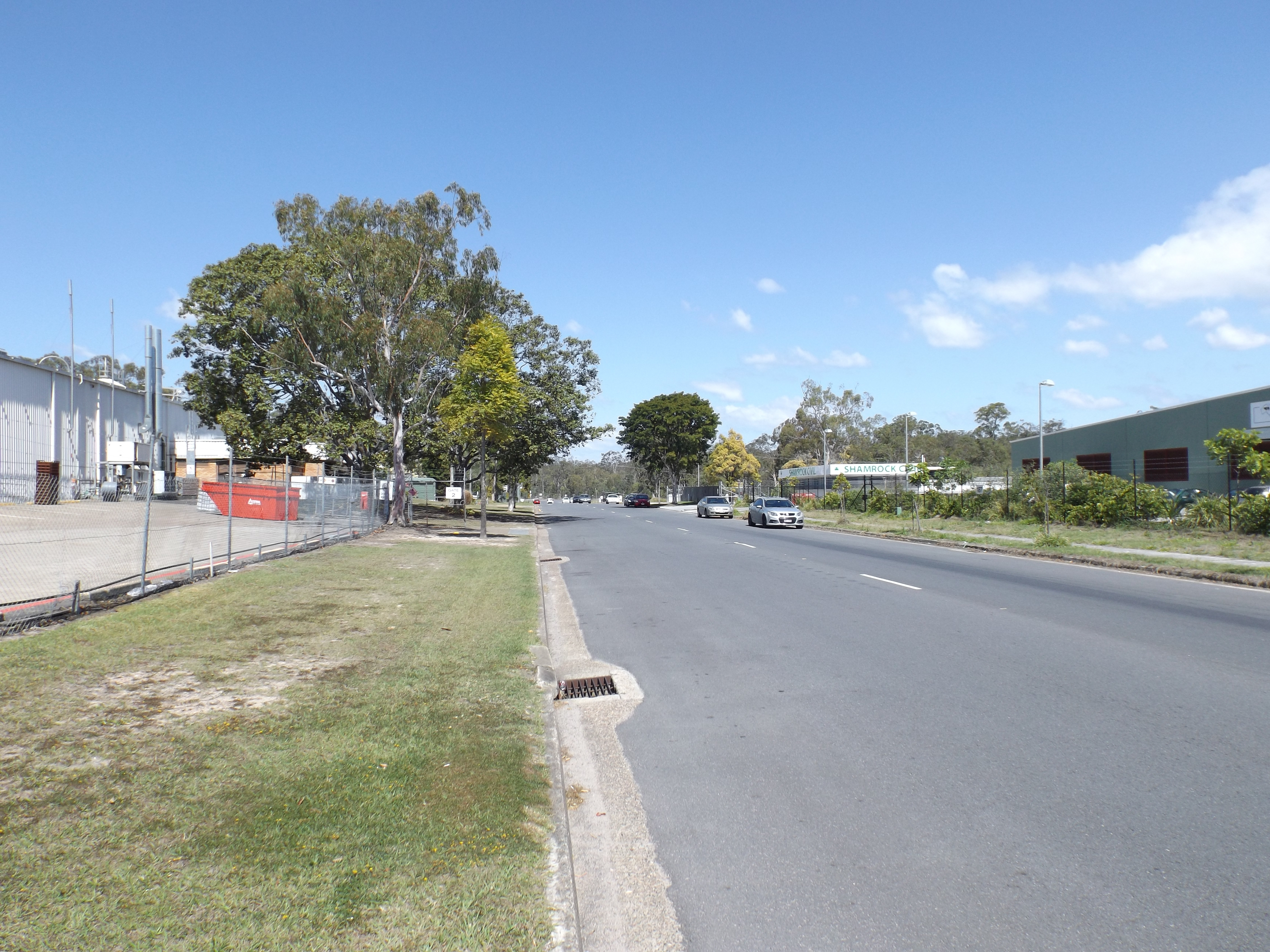
- Cobalt Street, 2014

- Interactive map of Carole Park
- Coordinates: 27.6216°S 152.9283°E
- Country: Australia
- State: Queensland
- City: Ipswich
- LGA: City of Ipswich
- Location: 26.0 km (16.2 mi) E of Ipswich CBD; 25.3 km (15.7 mi) SW of Brisbane CBD
- Established: 1972

Government
  - State electorate: Jordan
  - Federal division: Oxley

Area
  - Total: 4.0 km^{2} (1.5 sq mi)

Population
  - Total: 8 (2021 census)
  - Density: 2.00/km^{2} (5.2/sq mi)
- Time zone: UTC+10:00 (AEST)
- Postcode: 4300
Suburbs around Carole Park
Gailes	Wacol	Ellen Grove
Camira	Carole Park	Forest Lake
Camira	Camira	Greenbank

Carole Park is an industrial suburb in the City of Ipswich, Queensland, Australia. In the 2021 census, Carole Park had a population of 8 people.

== Geography ==
Since 2010, Carole Park is now only used for industrial purposes.

== History ==
The suburb was not settled until the 1940s with the exception of a few farms.

Carole Park State School opened on 17 September 1948. It is presently within the boundaries of the Brisbane suburb of Wacol.

Electricity was provided around 1965 and mains water in 1969. The Queensland Housing Commission provided housing to residents in the 1970s. The Queensland Place Names Board designated the suburb and its name in 1972.

Prior to 2010, Carole Park was a half residential and half industrial suburb with the Logan Motorway separating the two areas, with the residential part in City of Brisbane and the industrial part in City of Ipswich (this split was the result of Shire of Moreton being absorbed into City of Brisbane, City of Ipswich and Shire of Esk during the 1990s).

In May 2010, the residential part of Carole Park became part of the Brisbane suburb of Ellen Grove with postcode 4078, while the industrial part remained as the suburb of Carole Park in the City of Ipswich.

== Demographics ==
At the 2011 census, the suburb had "no people or a very low population".

In the 2016 census, Carole Park had "no people or a very low population".

In the 2021 census, Carole Park had a population of 8 people.

== Education ==
There are no schools in Carole Park. The nearest primary schools are Camira State School in neighbouring Camira to the south-west and Carole Park State School in Wacol to the north. The nearest secondary schools are Forest Lake State High School in neighbouring Forest Lake to the east and Woodcrest State College in Springfeld to the south.
