= Goodna railway station =

Railway station in Queensland, Australia

Goodna
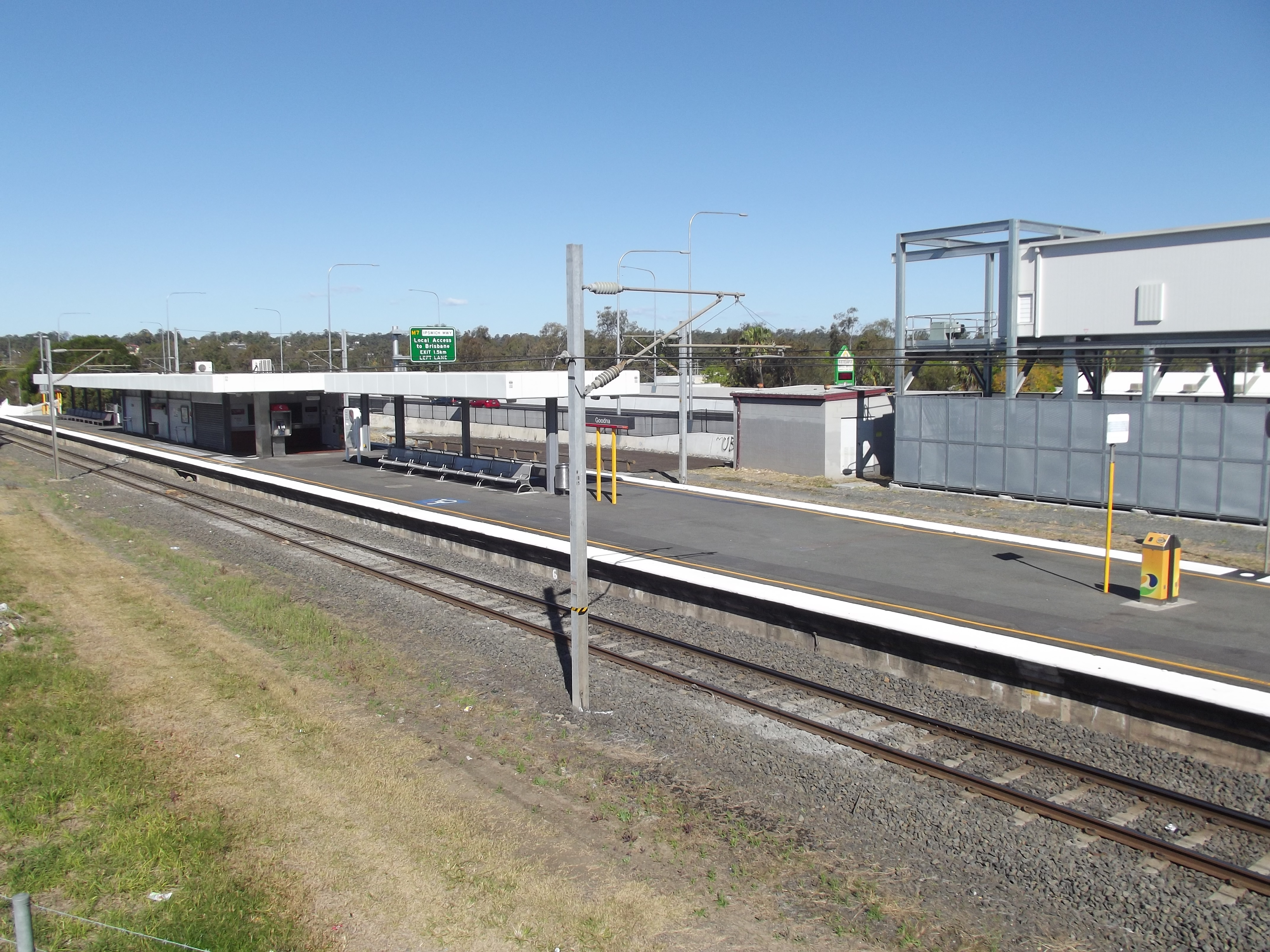
- Eastbound view in September 2012

General information
- Location: Ryan Street, Goodna
- Coordinates: 27.6088°S 152.9017°E
- Owner: Queensland Rail
- Operator: Queensland Rail
- Line: T1 Ipswich/Rosewood
- Distance: 23.54 kilometres from Central
- Platforms: 2 (1 island)
- Tracks: 2

Construction
- Structure type: Ground
- Accessible: Yes

Other information
- Station code: 600331 (platform 1); 600332 (platform 2)
- Fare zone: go card 2
- Website: Translink

History
- Opened: 1874; 152 years ago

Services
Preceding station	Queensland Rail	Following station
Gailes towards Caboolture, Nambour or Gympie North	Ipswich/Rosewood line	Redbank towards Ipswich or Rosewood
Location

Goodna is a railway station operated by Queensland Rail on the Ipswich/Rosewood line. It opened in 1874 and serves the Ipswich suburb of Goodna. It is a ground level station, featuring one island platform with two faces.

== History ==
Goodna is served by City network services operating from Caboolture and Bowen Hills to Ipswich and Rosewood.

The station underwent repair work in 2011 to compensate flood damage to signalling and station amenities after the platform became completely submerged underwater during the 2011 floods.

== Platforms and services ==
Goodna is served by trains operating to and from Ipswich and Rosewood. Most city-bound services run to Caboolture and Nambour, with some morning peak trains terminating at Bowen Hills. Some afternoon inbound services on weekdays run to Kippa-Ring. Goodna is twenty minutes from Ipswich and 36 minutes on an all-stops train from Central.

Goodna platform arrangement
Platform	Line	Destination	Notes
1	T1 Ipswich/Rosewood	Roma Street (to Caboolture and Nambour/Gympie North lines)	
2	T1 Ipswich/Rosewood	Ipswich or Rosewood	

== Transport links ==
Westside Bus Company operate four bus routes to and from Goodna station:

- 463: to Forest Lake
- 500: to Riverlink Shopping Centre
- 522: to Springfield Central
- 524: to Redbank Plains
