= Gailes, Queensland =

Gailes
- Suburb
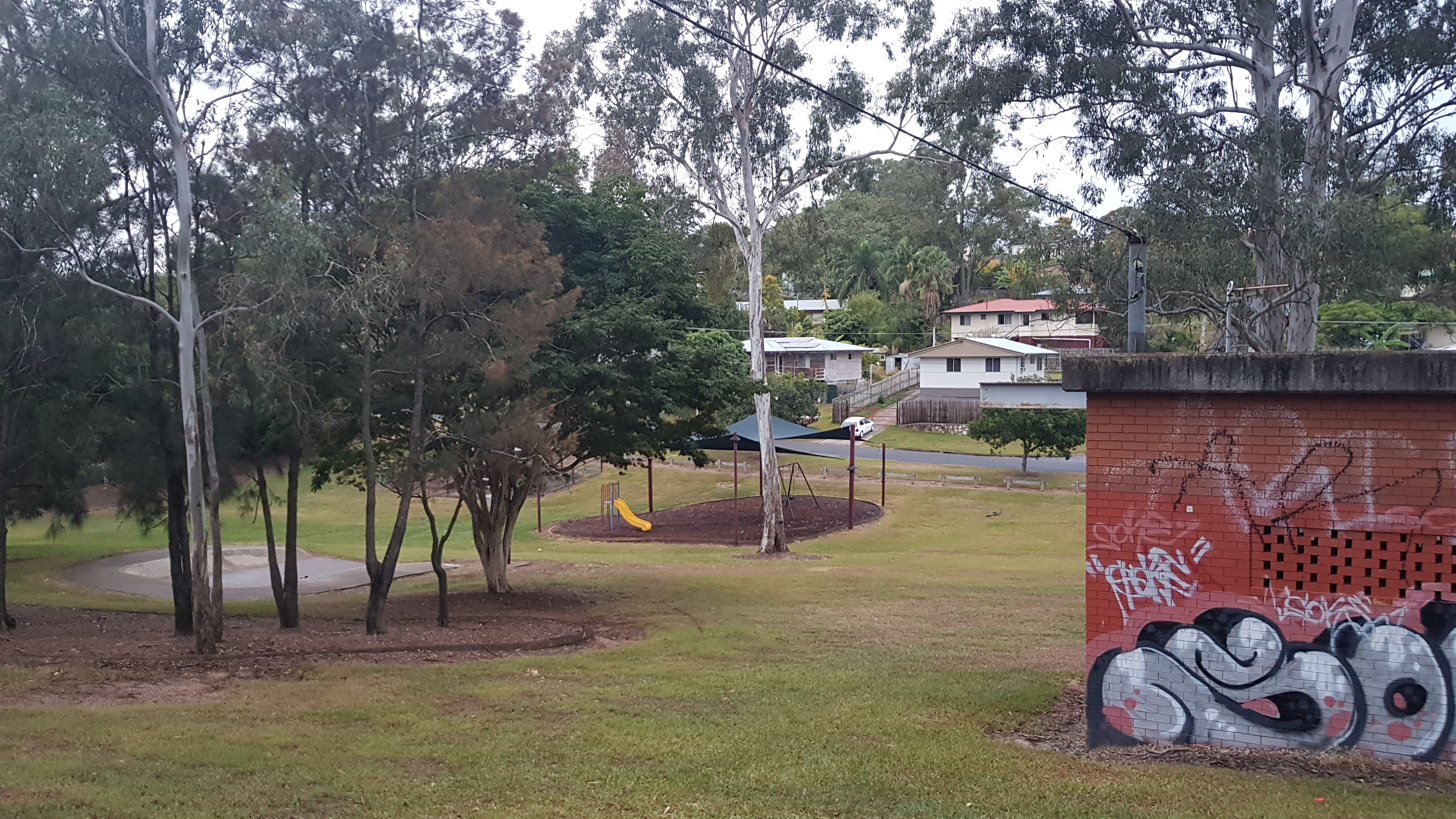
- Fred Ferguson Park, 2023

- Interactive map of Gailes
- Coordinates: 27.6138°S 152.9102°E
- Country: Australia
- State: Queensland
- City: Ipswich
- LGA: City of Ipswich
- Location: 7.5 km (4.7 mi) NW of Bellbird Park; 8.1 km (5.0 mi) N of Springfield; 18.0 km (11.2 mi) E of Ipswich CBD; 23.9 km (14.9 mi) SW of Brisbane CBD

Government
  - State electorate: Jordan
  - Federal division: Oxley

Area
  - Total: 1.3 km^{2} (0.50 sq mi)

Population
  - Total: 1,831 (2021 census)
  - Density: 1,410/km^{2} (3,650/sq mi)
- Time zone: UTC+10:00 (AEST)
- Postcode: 4300
Suburbs around Gailes
Goodna	Wacol	Wacol
Goodna	Gailes	Carole Park
Goodna	Camira	Carole Park

Gailes is a suburb of Ipswich in the City of Ipswich, Queensland, Australia. In the 2021 census, Gailes had a population of 1,831 people.

== Geography ==
The suburb is bounded to the north by the Ipswich Motorway and the Main Line railway and to the west by Woogaroo Creek, a tributary of the Brisbane River.

The land use is predominantly residential with a small amount of undeveloped bushland in the south-west of the locality.

== History ==
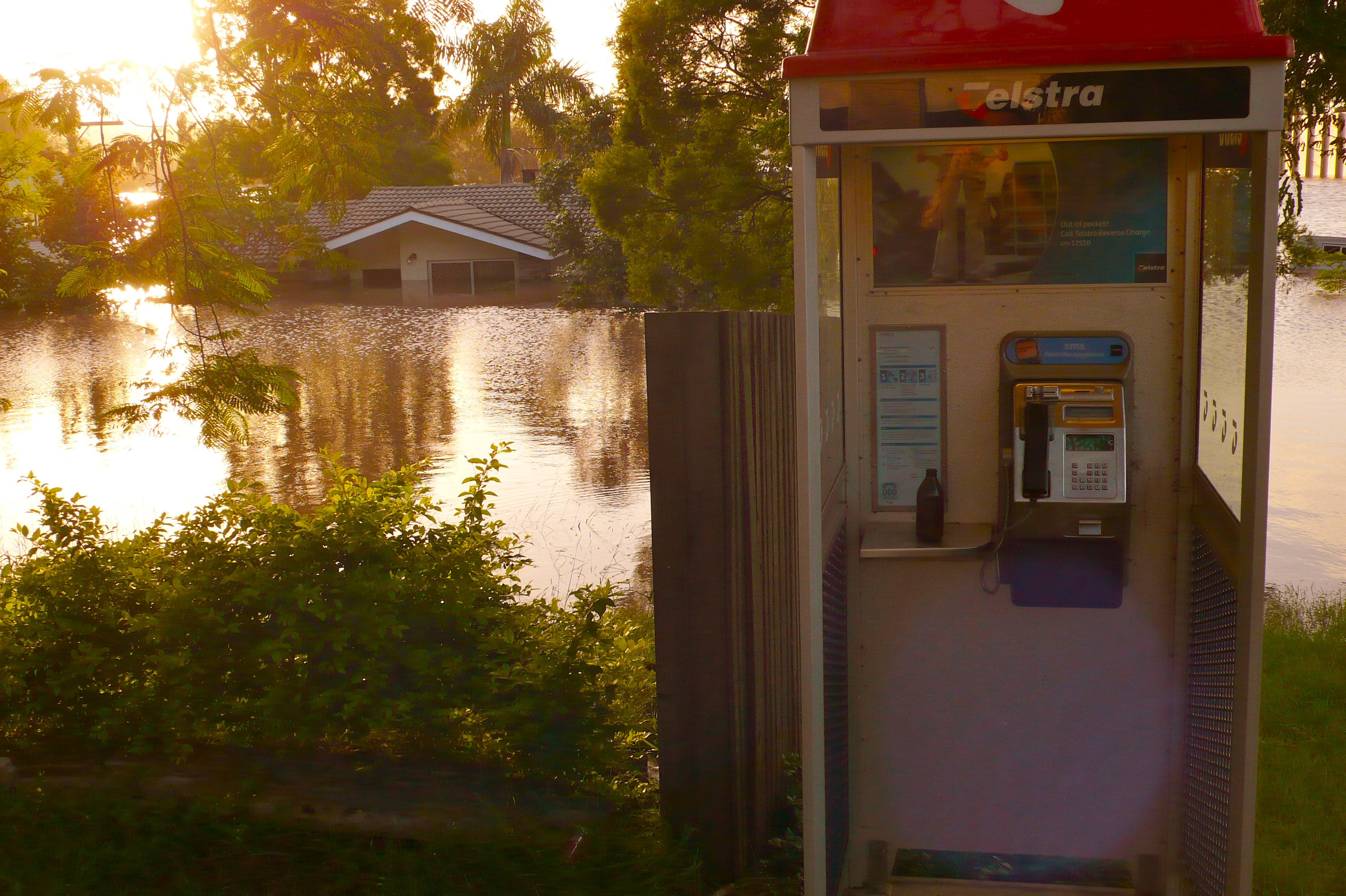
House flooded in Gailes, 12 January 2011

In 1823 explorer John Oxley named a local high point Dingo Hill (27.6150°S 152.9164°E) which became the local name for the area. This led to a local railway siding to also be named Dingo Hill.

On 16 September 1925, the Dingo Hill railway siding was upgraded and renamed Gailes railway station (27.6021°S 152.9189°E), after the Western Gailes Golf Club in Ayrshire, Scotland. The suburb of Gailes takes its name from the railway station. The name Gailes means "overgrown by bog-myrth".

Suburban boundary changes in 1986 resulted in the Gailes railway station now being within the suburb of Wacol in City of Brisbane. Similarly, the hill Dingo Hill is now within the neighbouring suburb of Camira.

In January 2011 Gailes was flooded during the 2011 Queensland floods.

== Demographics ==
In the 2011 census, Gailes had a population of 1,646 people.

In the 2016 census, Gailes had a population of 1,828 people.

In the 2021 census, Gailes had a population of 1,831 people.

== Transport ==
There is no railway station within the suburb of Gailes. The nearest railway stations are Goodna railway station and Gailes railway station (which, despite the name, is in the neighbouring suburb of Wacol), both of which provide regular Queensland Rail City network services to Brisbane, Ipswich and Rosewood via Ipswich.

== Education ==
There are no schools in Gailes. The nearest primary school is Camira State School in neighbouring Camira to the south. The nearest secondary schools are Bellbird Park State Secondary College in Bellbird Park to the south-west and Woodcrest State College in Springfield to the south.

== Facilities ==
Gailes Post Office is at Gailes Shopping Centre, 65 Old Logan Road (27.6111°S 152.9158°E).

== Amenities ==
There are a number of parks in the area, including:

- Fred Ferguson Park (27.6096°S 152.9132°E)
- Knoblanche Park (27.6081°S 152.9135°E)
- Lowry Park (27.6089°S 152.9187°E)
- Martin Coogan Park (27.6112°S 152.9097°E)
- Noble Park (27.6175°S 152.9069°E)
