= Gailes railway station, Brisbane =

Railway station in Queensland, Australia

Gailes
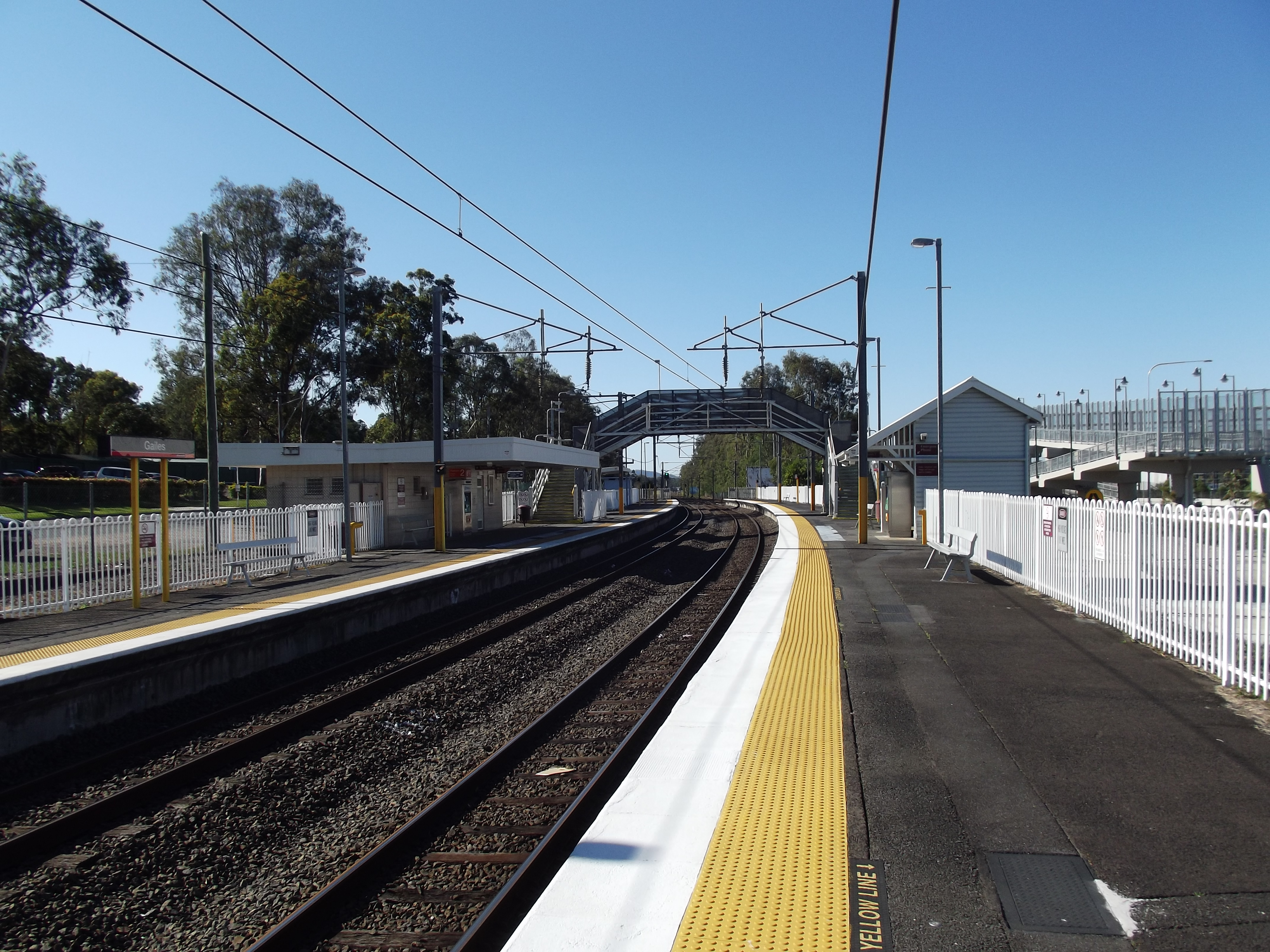
- Northbound view from Platform 1 in September 2012

General information
- Location: Wilruna Street, Wacol
- Coordinates: 27.6022°S 152.9190°E
- Owner: Queensland Rail
- Operator: Queensland Rail
- Line: T1 Ipswich/Rosewood
- Distance: 21.59 kilometres from Central
- Platforms: 2 side
- Tracks: 2

Construction
- Structure type: Ground

Other information
- Station code: 600329 (platform 1); 600330 (platform 2)
- Fare zone: Zone 2
- Website: Translink

History
- Opened: 1919; 107 years ago
- Former names: Dingo Hill

Services
Preceding station	Queensland Rail	Following station
Wacol towards Caboolture via Roma Street	T1 Ipswich/Rosewood line	Goodna towards Ipswich or Rosewood
Location

Gailes is a railway station operated by Queensland Rail on the Ipswich/Rosewood line. It opened in 1919 and serves the Ipswich suburb of Gailes and the Brisbane suburb of Wacol. It is a ground level station, featuring two side platforms.

== History ==
The station opened in 1919 as Dingo Hill. It was renamed in 1925 to Gailes.

== Platforms and services ==
Gailes is served by trains operating to and from Ipswich and Rosewood. Most city-bound services run to Caboolture and Nambour, with some morning peak trains terminating at Bowen Hills. Some afternoon inbound services on weekdays run to Kippa-Ring. Gailes is 23 minutes from Ipswich and 34 minutes on an all-stops train from Central.

Gailes platform arrangement
Platform	Line	Destination	Notes
1	T1 Ipswich/Rosewood	Ipswich or Rosewood	
2	T1 Ipswich/Rosewood	Roma Street (to Caboolture and Nambour/Gympie North lines)	
