= Redbank, Queensland =

Redbank Ipswich, Queensland
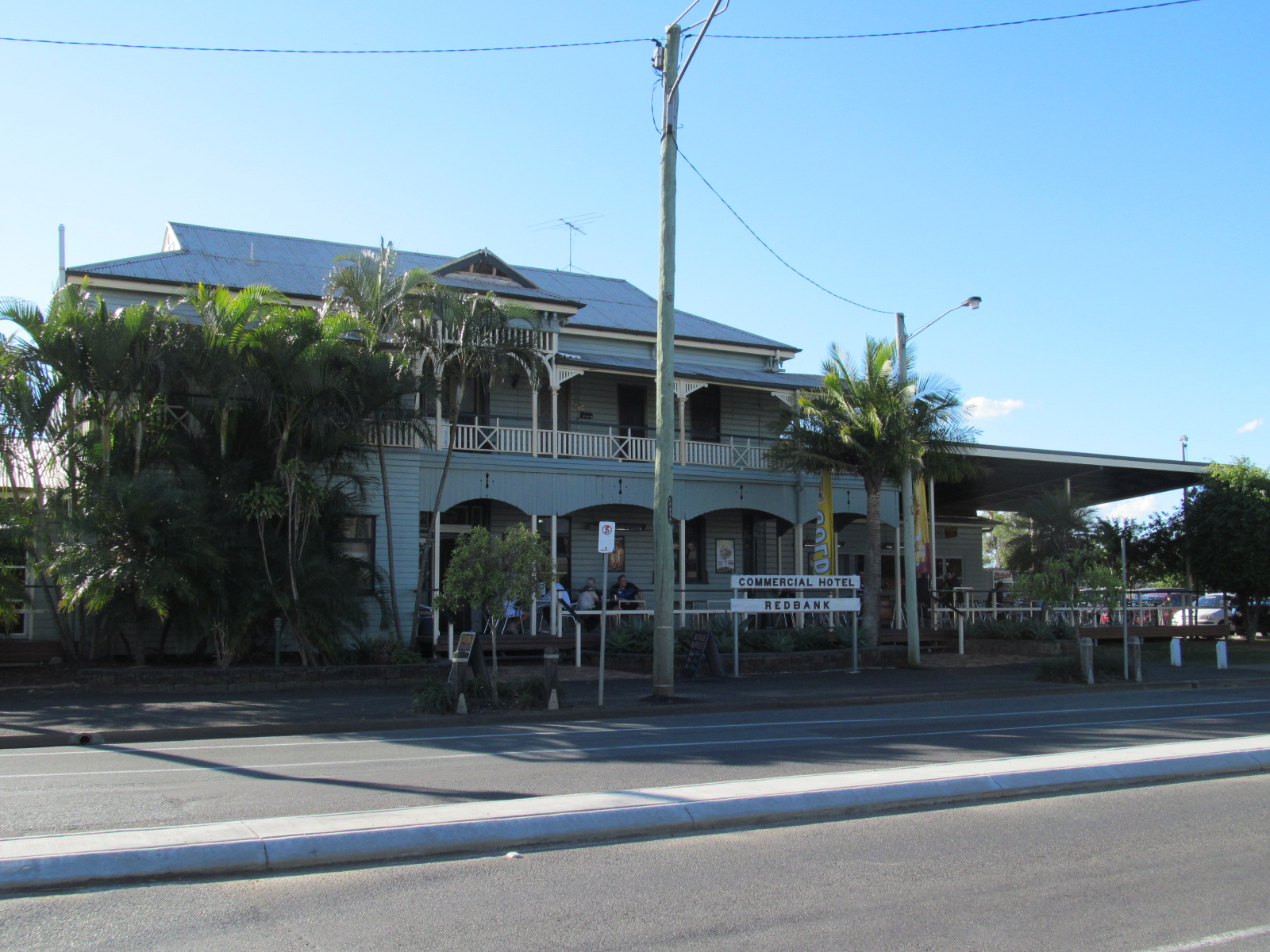
- Commercial Hotel, Redbank, 2013

- Coordinates: 27.6030°S 152.8733°E
- Population: 2,931 (2021 census)
  - Density: 353.1/km^{2} (915/sq mi)
- Postcode(s): 4301
- Area: 8.3 km^{2} (3.2 sq mi)
- Time zone: AEST (UTC+10:00)
- Location: 11.8 km (7 mi) E of Ipswich CBD; 28.3 km (18 mi) SW of Brisbane CBD
- LGA(s): City of Ipswich
- State electorate(s): Bundamba
- Federal division(s): Oxley
Suburbs around Redbank:
| Moggill | Moggill | Moggill |
| Riverview | Redbank | Goodna |
| Collingwood Park | Redbank Plains; Bellbird Park | Goodna |

Redbank is a suburb in the City of Ipswich, Queensland, Australia. In the 2021 census, Redbank had a population of 2,931 people.

== Geography ==
The suburb is bounded to the west by Six Mile Creek, to the north-west, north, and north-east by the Brisbane River, to the east by Goodna Creek, and to the south-west by another segment of Goodna Creek.

The Ipswich Motorway enters the locality from the east (Goodna) and exits to the west (Riverview). The Main Line railway runs parallel but north of the motorway with two railway stations in the suburb:

- Redbank railway station, providing passengers services (27.5995°S 152.8724°E)
- Redbank Workshops railway station, on a spur line serving the Redbank Railway Workshops (27.5945°S 152.8746°E)

The land use north of the railway line through to the river is a mix of industrial, commercial and agricultural use. The Redbank Railway Workshops being a major industry in the suburb. The land between the railway line and the motorway is predominantly residential. The land south of the motorway is a large tract of undeveloped bushland with further residential development in the far south of the suburb.

== History ==
The origin of the suburb name is from a description of the area provided by Major Edmund Lockyer whilst exploring in a boat along the Brisbane River.

While the Redbank area is known for its agricultural and pastoral origins, it has a more varied history.

In the late 1850s, the first farmers in the area settled on the river flats situated to the north of the current railway station. This settlement featured a brickworks, sawmill, stores, cottages, a school and nondenominational church, though due to severe flooding, it was relocated south of the railway station some years later.

In the early years, the rich black loamy soil of the plains supported crops of maize, potatoes and fodder, while cotton became a significant crop in the 1860s and 1870s. By the beginning of the 20th century, dairying became more important with the establishment of several creameries in the area.

The late 1850s saw the establishment of the first secondary industry in the area, with a boiling down works and fellmongery owned by Mr John Campbell and Mr Town.

Redbank's school was originally opened in July 1865 by the Roman Catholic Church on a 2-acre (0.81 ha) land parcel with an initial enrolment of 31 students. The building was used as both a school and a church. In 1881, it became Redbank State School. It closed on 30 September 1895, but reopened on 6 September 1897. In 1951, a further 5.5 acres (2.2 ha) of land was acquired to expand the school site.

The Redbank - Bundamba Loop Line comprised a series of railway sidings serving coal mines in the area.

Redbank Rifle Range operated from 1912 to 1980 south of the Redbank railway station. It was the home of a number rifle clubs over the years including Ipswich Railway Rifle Club, Ipswich City Rifle Club, Ipswich and District Rifle Club, which were involved in competitive target shooting. The 700-yard (640 m) firing mound was about 35 metres (38 yd) from the railway station with the targets 700 yards (640 m) away (approx 27.6057°S 152.8755°E). During World War II, there was a large military camp and training area at the range with up to 6,000 Australian and American troops. The development of the Ipswich Motorway reduced the length of the rifle range which led to the relocation of the Ipswich and District Rifle Club to South Ripley in 1972.

The Redbank Railway Workshops has been operating in the suburb since 1958.

The current Redbank Plaza Library was opened in 1998 and had a major refurbishment in 2010.

== Demographics ==
In the 2016 census, Redbank had a population of 1,834 people. Redbank had an unemployment rate of 14.5%, more than double the Australian unemployment rate of 6.9%.

In the 2021 census, Redbank had a population of 2,931 people.

== Education ==
Redbank State School is a government primary (Prep-6) school for boys and girls at 9 Brisbane Road (27.6029°S 152.8645°E). In 2018, the school had an enrolment of 184 students with 16 teachers (13 full-time equivalent) and 19 non-teaching staff (11 full-time equivalent).

There are no secondary schools in Redbank. The nearest government secondary school is Bellbird Park State Secondary College in neighbouring Bellbird Park to the south.

== Amenities ==
Redbank Plaza is a shopping centre at 1 Collingwood Drive (27.6055°S 152.8679°E). It has supermarkets, department stores, a cinema complex and many speciality stores.

Ipswich City Council operates a public library in Redbank at Level 3 Redbank Plaza Shopping Centre.

The Redbank-Collingwood Park Sport complex, accessed from Collingwood Drive (27.6050°S 152.8720°E) has a soccer field, netball, volleyball, tennis and basketball courts.

Redbank Memorial Reserve in Bridge Street (27.5997°S 152.8750°E) has a number of war memorials, most of which have been relocated from other sites in the area.

There are a number of other parks in the area:

- Broadleaf Parade Park (27.6247°S 152.8798°E)
- Desborough Park (27.6224°S 152.8731°E)
- Goupong Park (27.6080°S 152.8713°E)
- Hillier Street Transmission Easement (27.6114°S 152.8808°E)
- Pan Pacific Peace Gardens, McAuliffe Street (27.5995°S 152.8807°E)
- Tofa Mamao A Samoa Park, Kruger Parade (27.6160°S 152.8713°E)

== Transport ==
Redbank railway station provides access to regular Queensland Rail City network services to Brisbane CBD, Ipswich and Rosewood. The Redbank train station has a Queensland Police Service Rail Squad stationed on platform 2 near the ticket office.
