= Camira, Queensland =

Camira
- Suburb
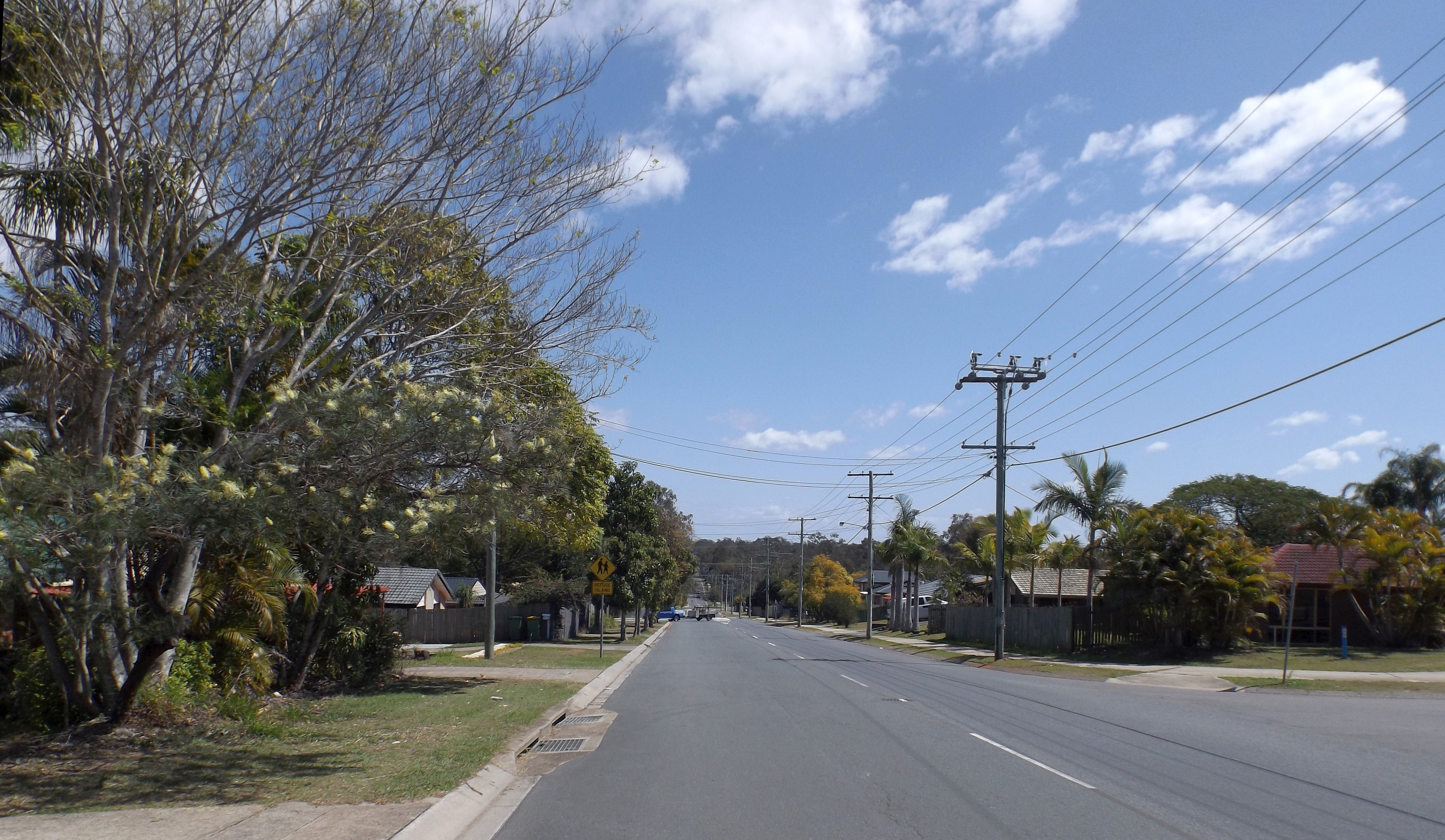
- Addison Road, 2014

- Interactive map of Camira
- Coordinates: 27.635°S 152.9199°E
- Country: Australia
- State: Queensland
- City: Ipswich
- LGA: City of Ipswich
- Location: 19.8 km (12.3 mi) E of Ipswich CBD; 26.2 km (16.3 mi) SW of Brisbane CBD

Government
  - State electorate: Jordan
  - Federal division: Oxley

Area
  - Total: 8.0 km^{2} (3.1 sq mi)

Population
  - Total: 7,415 (2021 census)
  - Density: 927/km^{2} (2,401/sq mi)
- Time zone: UTC+10:00 (AEST)
- Postcode: 4300
Suburbs around Camira
Goodna	Gailes	Carole Park
Bellbird Park	Camira	Greenbank
Springfield	Springfield Lakes	Greenbank

Camira is a suburb in the City of Ipswich, Queensland, Australia. In the 2021 census, Camira had a population of 7,415 people.

== Geography ==
Camira is located approximately 25 kilometres (16 mi) from Brisbane CBD, near Springfield Lakes.

Sandy creek flows through Camira, into Carole Park, joining Wolston Creek and then the Lower Brisbane River. Anecdotal sightings of platypuses have been reported in Sandy Creek

The Centenary Motorway and the Springfield railway line form the eastern boundary of the locality.

== History ==
The origin of the suburb name is from an Aboriginal (of unknown language) word meaning windy. The earliest record of the area is from government land sales in 1868 when the area was referred to as the 'Sandy Waterholes'

Camira State School opened on 29 January 1974.

== Demographics ==
In the 2011 census, Camira had a population of 7,391 people.

In the 2016 census, Camira had a population of 7,414 people.

In the 2021 census, Camira had a population of 7,415 people.

== Education ==
Camira State School is a government primary (Prep-6) school for boys and girls at 184-202 Old Logan Road (27.6213°S 152.9146°E). In 2025, the school had an enrolment of 679 students with 48 teachers (45 full-time equivalent) and 33 non-teaching staff (24 full-time equivalent). It includes a special education program.

There are no secondary schools in Camira. The nearest government secondary schools are Woodcrest State College in neighbouring Springfield to the south and Bellbird Park State Secondary College in neighbouring Bellbird Park to the west.

== Amenities ==
The Ipswich City Council operates a fortnightly mobile library service which visits the community centre.
