= Collingwood Park, Queensland =

Collingwood Park
- Suburb
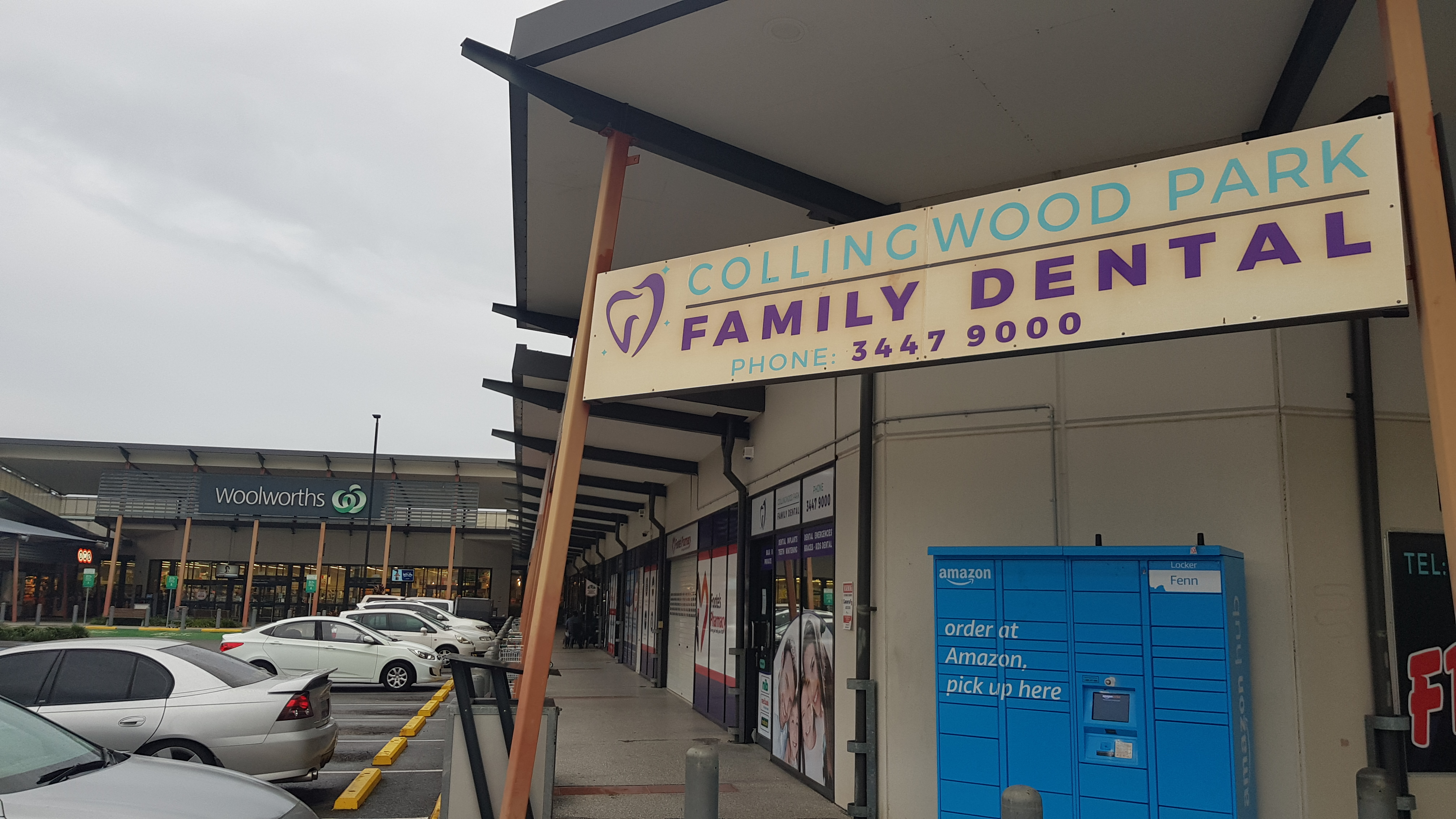
- Collingwood Park Shopping Centre, 2023

- Interactive map of Collingwood Park
- Coordinates: 27.6230°S 152.8561°E
- Country: Australia
- State: Queensland
- City: City of Ipswich
- LGA: City of Ipswich
- Location: 11.9 km (7.4 mi) E of Ipswich CBD; 31.5 km (19.6 mi) SW of Brisbane
- Established: 1982

Government
  - State electorate: Bundamba
  - Federal divisions: Blair; Oxley

Area
  - Total: 7.4 km^{2} (2.9 sq mi)

Population
  - Total: 9,246 (2021 census)
  - Density: 1,249/km^{2} (3,236/sq mi)
- Time zone: UTC+10:00 (AEST)
- Postcode: 4301
Suburbs around Collingwood Park
New Chum	Riverview	Redbank
New Chum	Collingwood Park	Redbank
Redbank Plains	Redbank Plains	Redbank Plains

Collingwood Park is a suburb of Ipswich in the City of Ipswich, Queensland, Australia. In the 2021 census, Collingwood Park had a population of 9,246 people.

== Geography ==
Collingwood Park, a residential suburb, is 11 kilometres (6.8 mi) east of the Ipswich, next to the historic suburb of Redbank. Its eastern boundary is delineated by Goodna Creek and the western boundary by Six Mile Creek. Housing development began circa 1980 with the establishment of two HIA display villages. Redbank Plaza is a large shopping mall, located on the northern boundary of the suburb. The main thoroughfare is Collingwood Drive which runs south from the shopping centre.

== History ==
Prior to the establishment of the suburb, in 1967, Westfalen No. 3 Colliery commenced mining under a mining lease and the land was mined for the next 7 years (until 1974). In 1976, part of the land above the mine was rezoned as residential land. This would become a problem by the 1980s when roads within the region were beginning to show signs of cracking.

The suburb was named and bounded on 28 August 1982.

Throughout the 1980s, Collingwood Park was marketed as, "The Dress Circle Suburb of Ipswich". The suburb's name implied a "leafy" residential area which differentiated it from nearby Redbank, the site of several collieries and industries: a map, c.1940, showed the area as devoid of any development apart from a perimeter road.

The 13th Australian Scout Jamboree (28 December 1982– 8 January 1983) was held within the suburb.

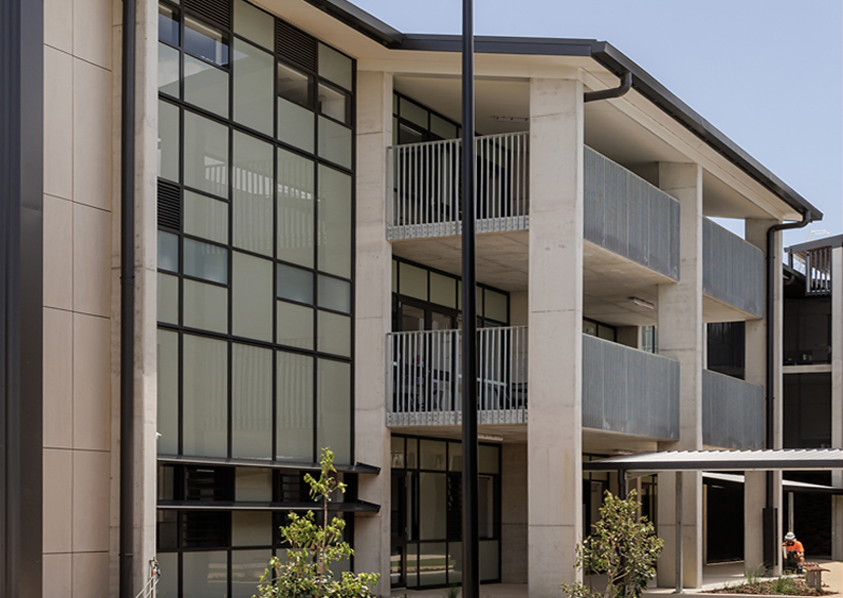
Front view of A Block, Collingwood Park State Secondary College, 2026

Collingwood Park State School opened on 28 January 1986.

Woodlinks State School opened on 1 January 2011.

Collingwood Park State Secondary College opened in 2025, initially enrolling students in Year 7 and Year 8.

== Demographics ==
In the 2011 census, Collingwood Park had a population of 6,622 people, 50.6% female and 49.4% male. The median age of the Collingwood Park population was 28 years, 9 years below the national median of 37. 68.0% of people living in Collingwood Park were born in Australia. The other top responses for country of birth were New Zealand 8.7%, England 3.9%, Samoa 1.3%, Philippines 0.9% and Vietnam 0.9%. 80.1% of people only spoke English at home; the next most common languages were 3.5% Samoan, 2.1% Spanish, 1.5% Vietnamese, 1.4% Dinka and 0.8% Mandarin.

In the 2016 census, Collingwood Park had a population of 7,104 people, 51.1% female and 48.9% male. The median age of the Collingwood Park population was 30 years, 8 years below the national median of 38. 67.2% of people living in Collingwood Park were born in Australia. The other top responses for country of birth were New Zealand 8.1%, England 3.4%, Samoa 1.5%, China (excludes SARs and Taiwan) 1.1% and Vietnam 0.9%. 77.7% of people only spoke English at home; the next most common languages were 2.9% Samoan, 1.7% Spanish, 1.5% Vietnamese, 1.1% Mandarin and 1.1% Dinka.

In the 2021 census, Collingwood Park had a population of 9,246 people, 50.7% female and 49.3% male. The median age of the Collingwood Park population was 31 years, 7 years below the national median of 38. 65.9% of people living in Collingwood Park were born in Australia. The other top responses for country of birth were New Zealand 8.3%, England 2.9%, the Philippines 2.5%, Samoa 2.2% and India 1.4%. 74.7% of people only spoke English at home; the next most common languages were 4.1% Samoan, 1.5% Tagalog, 1.4% Vietnamese, 1.4% Spanish and 1.0% Swahili.

== Education ==
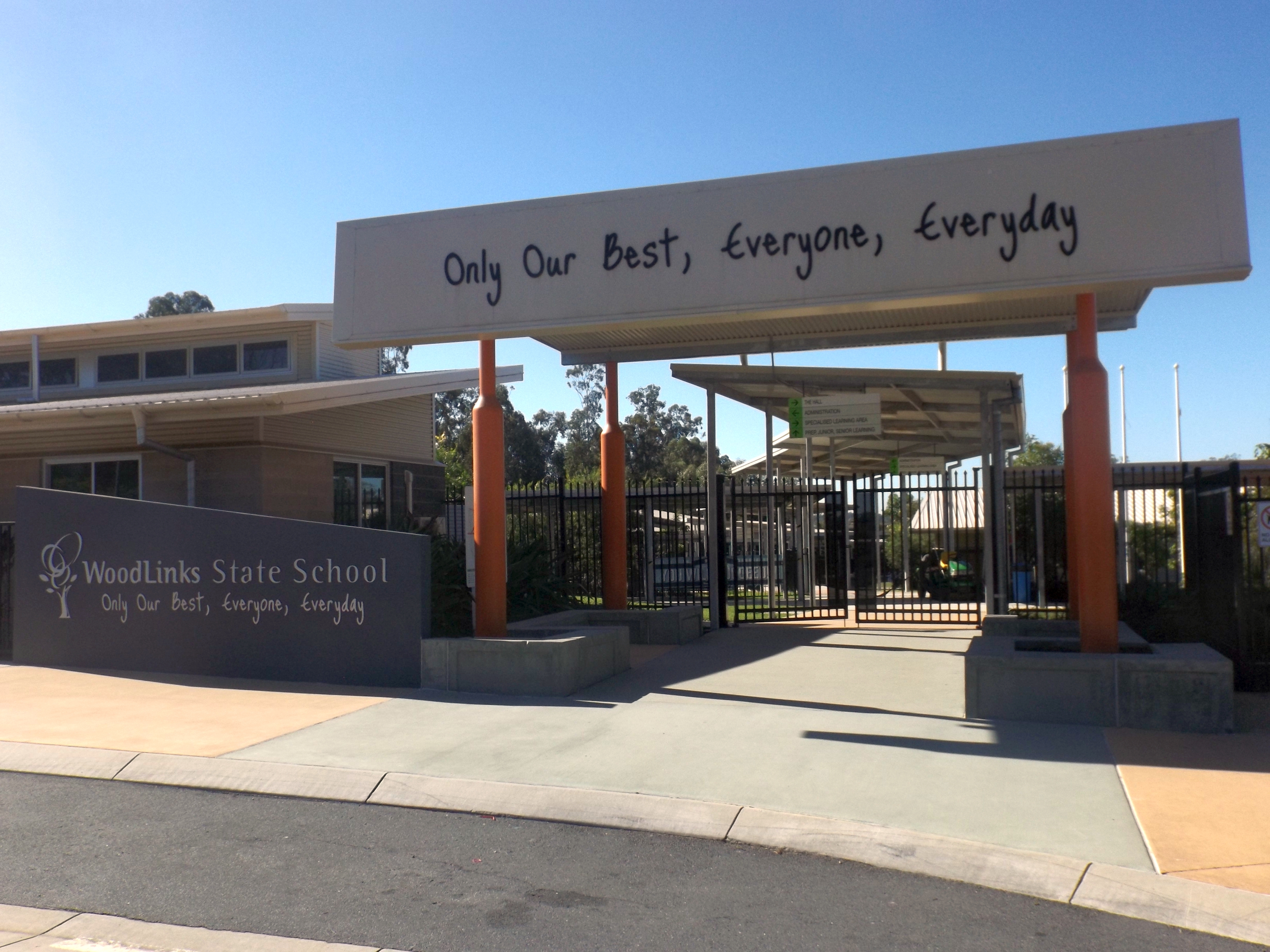
Woodlinks State School, 2016

Collingwood Park State School is a government primary (Prep–6) school for boys and girls on the corner of Burrel and Hannant Streets (27.6144°S 152.8630°E). In 2017, the school had an enrolment of 558 students with 45 teachers (37 full-time equivalent) and 23 non-teaching staff (16 full-time equivalent). It includes a special education program.

Woodlinks State School is a government primary (Prep–6) school for boys and girls at Woodlinks Way (27.6302°S 152.8527°E). In 2017, the school had an enrolment of 608 students with 41 teachers (38 full-time equivalent) and 28 non-teaching staff (18 full-time equivalent). It includes a special education program.

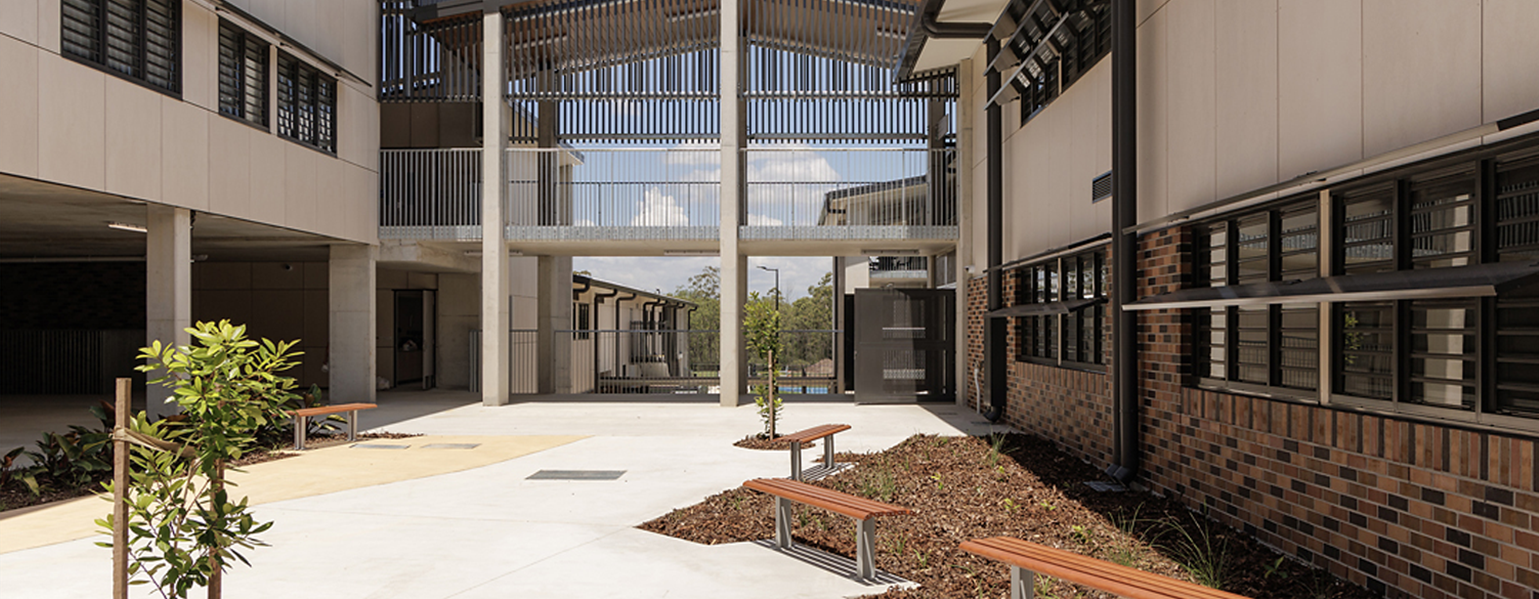
Between A and C blocks, Collingwood Park State Secondary College, 2026

Collingwood Park State Secondary College is a government secondary school for boys and girls at 165 Eagle Street (27.6241°S 152.8625°E). The school opened in 2025 offering Years 7 and 8 and will expand to Year 12 over the following years. Until that time, older students will need to attend another school; the nearest government secondary schools offering education to Year 12 are Redbank Plains State High School in Redbank Plains and Bellbird Park State Secondary College in Bellbird Park.
