= Riverlink Shopping Centre =

Mall in Ipswich, Queensland, Australia

Coordinates: 27°36′29.72″S 152°45′31.36″E

Riverlink Shopping Centre is a mall located in the northern area of the CBD of Ipswich, Queensland, Australia. Stage One (Riverlink West) was opened on 5 April 2007, whereas Stage 2 (Riverlink East) opened on 31 May 2007.

== Under development ==
After months of planning and discussion the Ipswich City Council proposed a development known as the Riverheart Precinct which would turn the Bremer River, which runs through Ipswich, into the focal point of the city.

On the Southern banks of the Riverheart Precinct are the parklands, riverside broadwalk and unique light and water displays. On the northern bank of the river is the Riverlink Shopping Centre.

== Features ==
- Anchored by 7 major and 'mini-major' stores
- Over 100 other specialty stores
- Floor space of 52,000m^{2}
- With over 2800 car parking bays available

== Stores ==
Riverlink is divided by a train line into two areas, Riverlink West and the smaller Riverlink East.

== Public transport ==
From the Ipswich Train Station, the 515 Riverlink Bus 504 service provides the closest stop.

== See also ==
- List of shopping centres in Australia
