= Brisbane =

Capital city of Queensland, Australia

Brisbane Turrbal/Yagara: Meanjin (Note: Other spellings include Mianjin, Mian-jin, Magan-djin, Meaanjin, Meeanjin, Meeannjin and Maganjin.)
- City
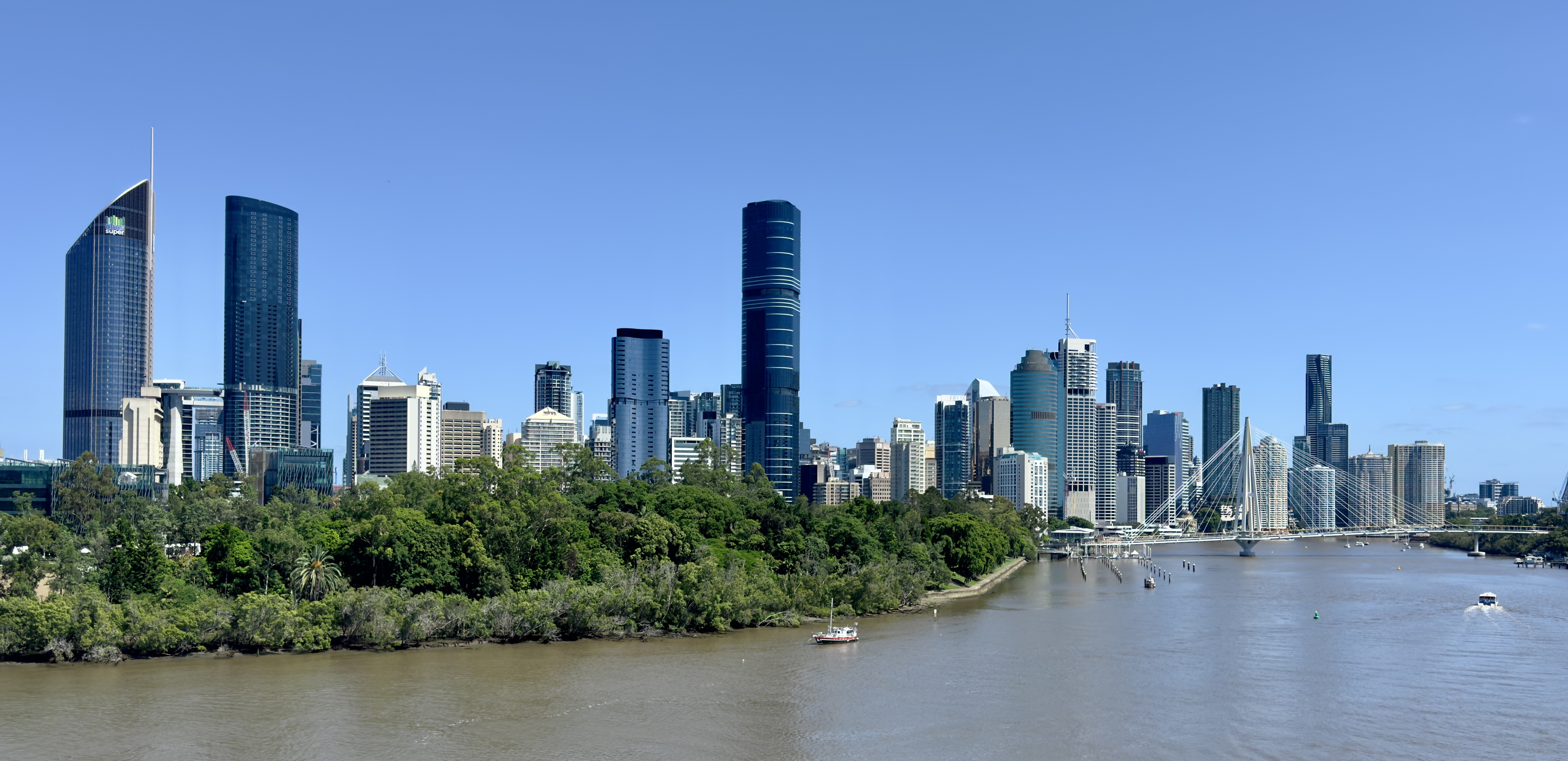
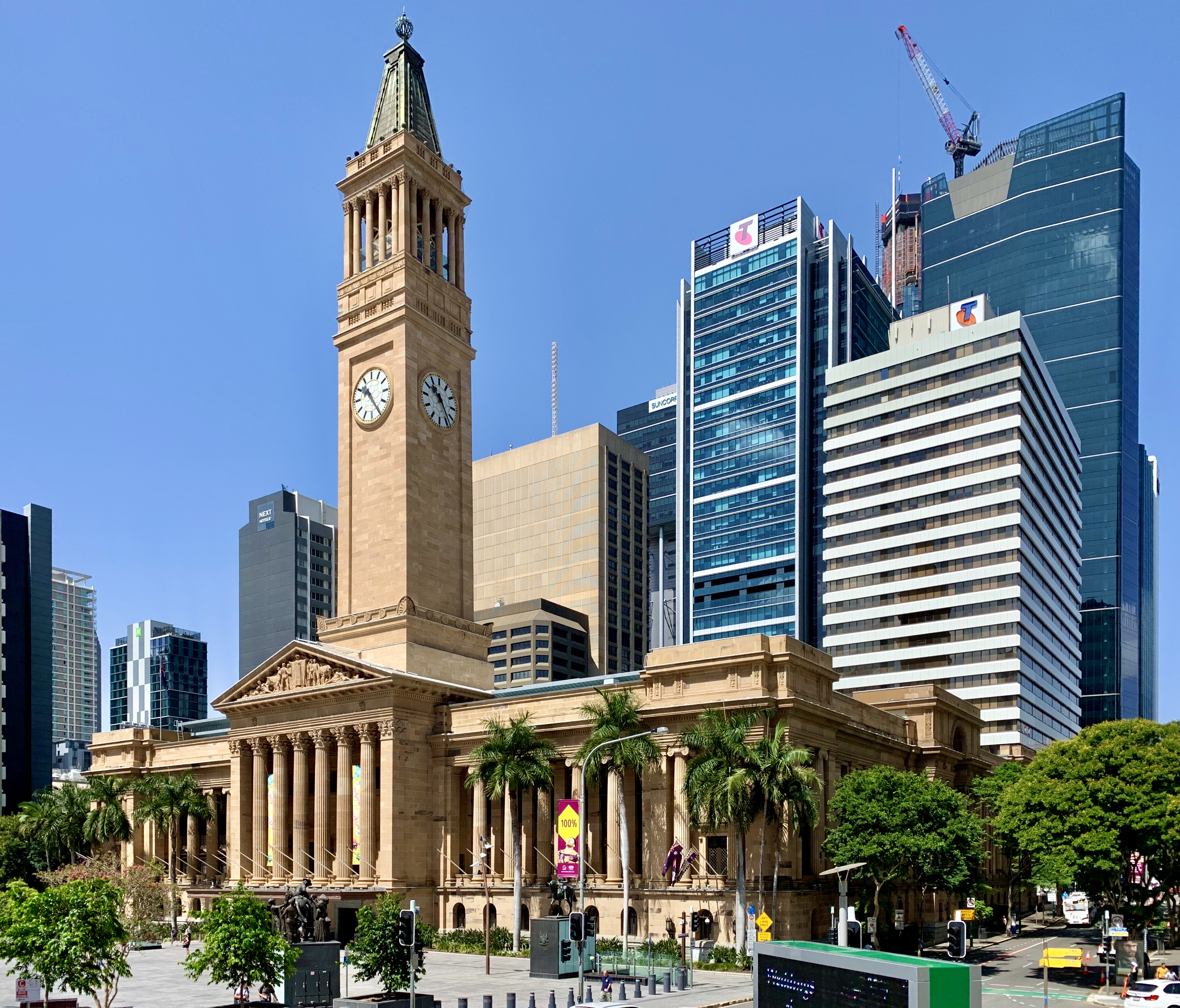
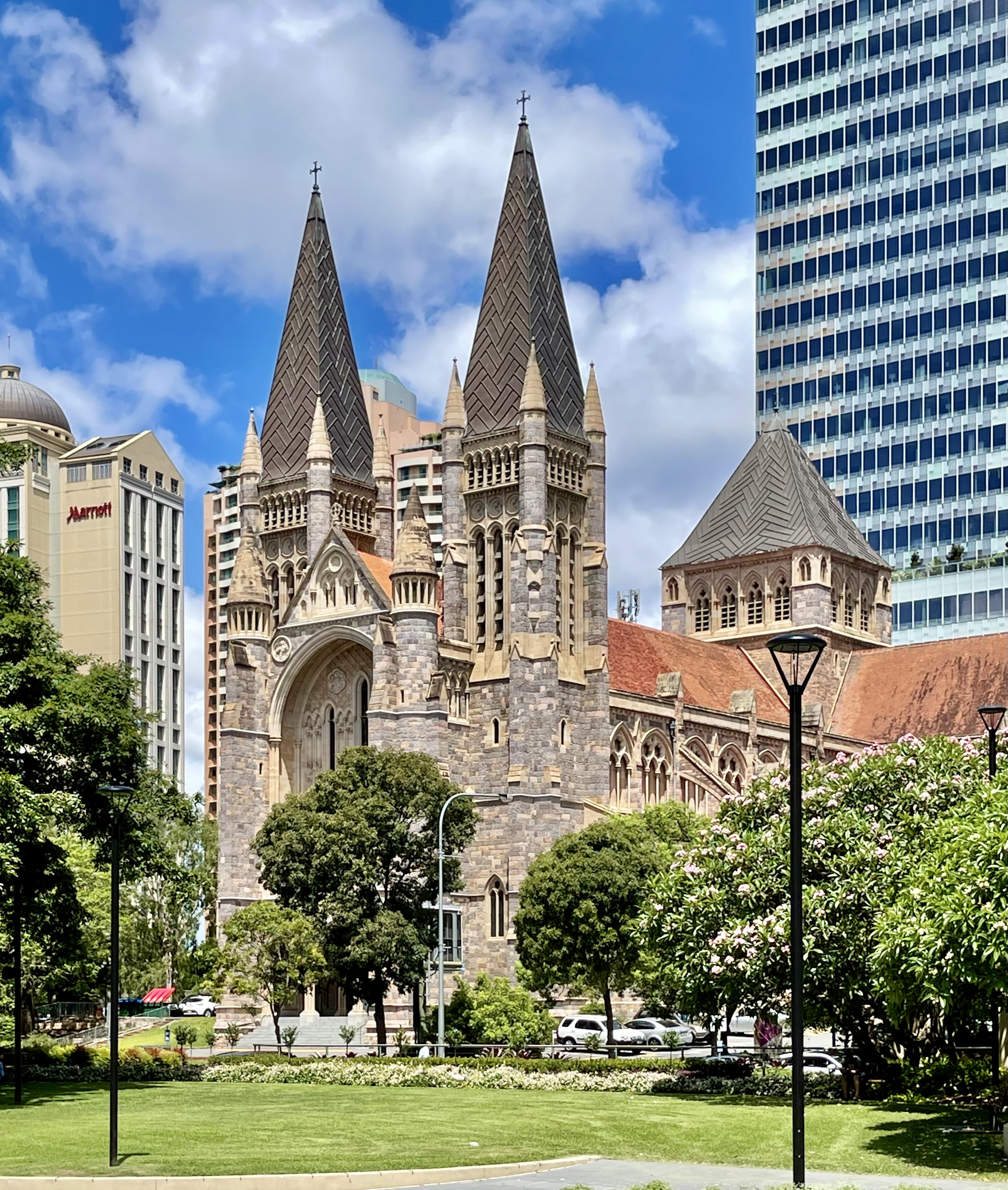
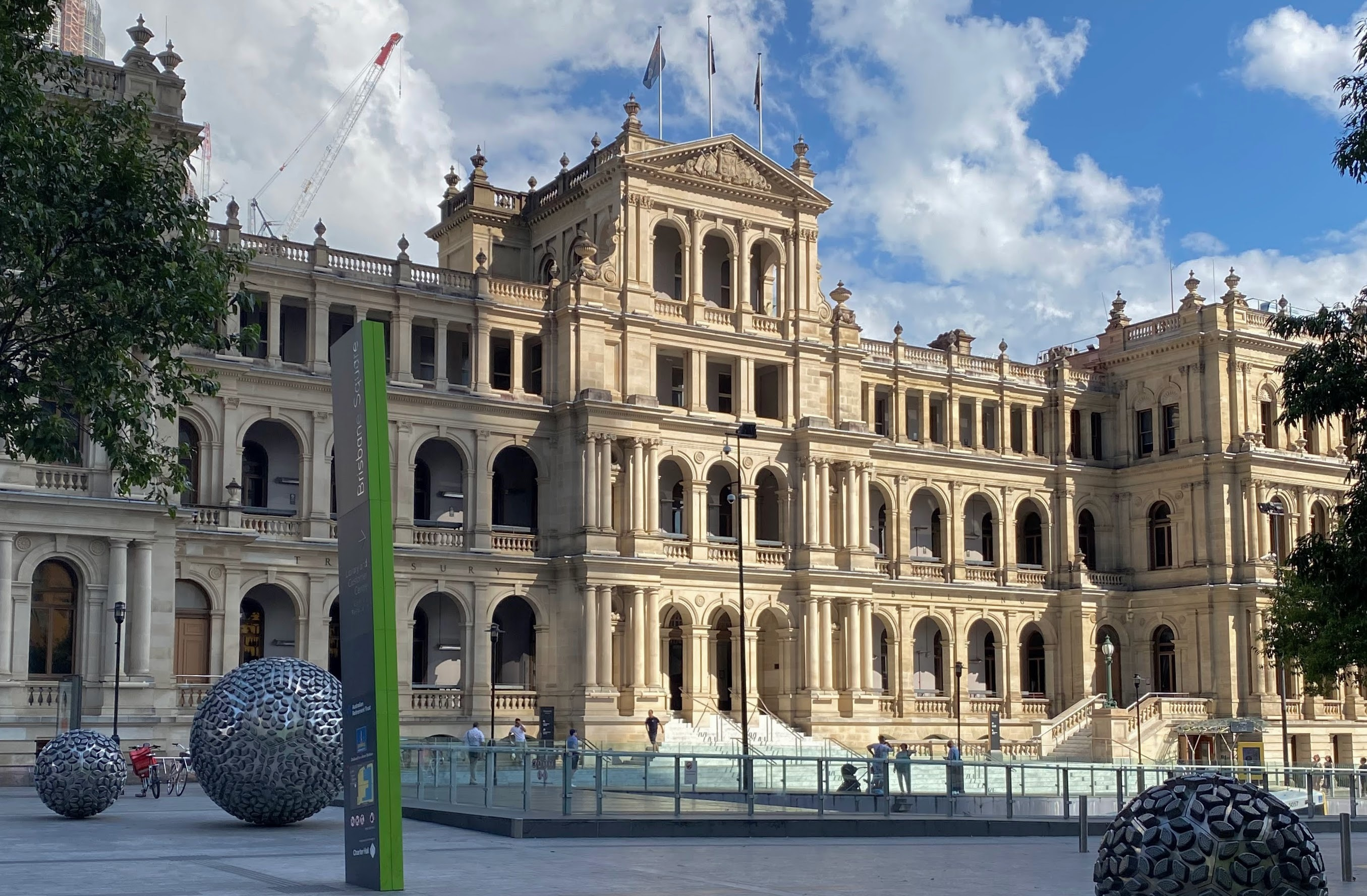
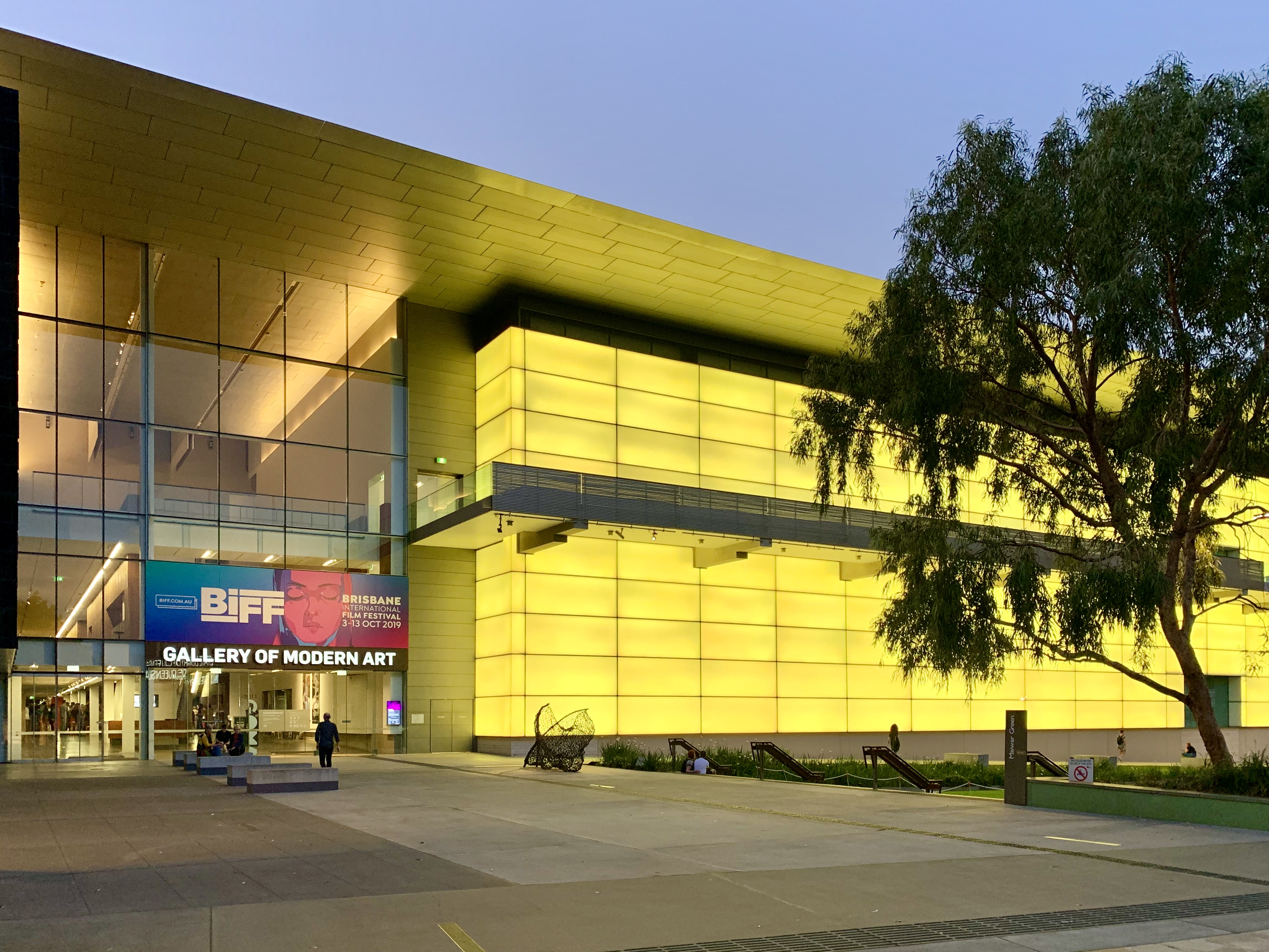
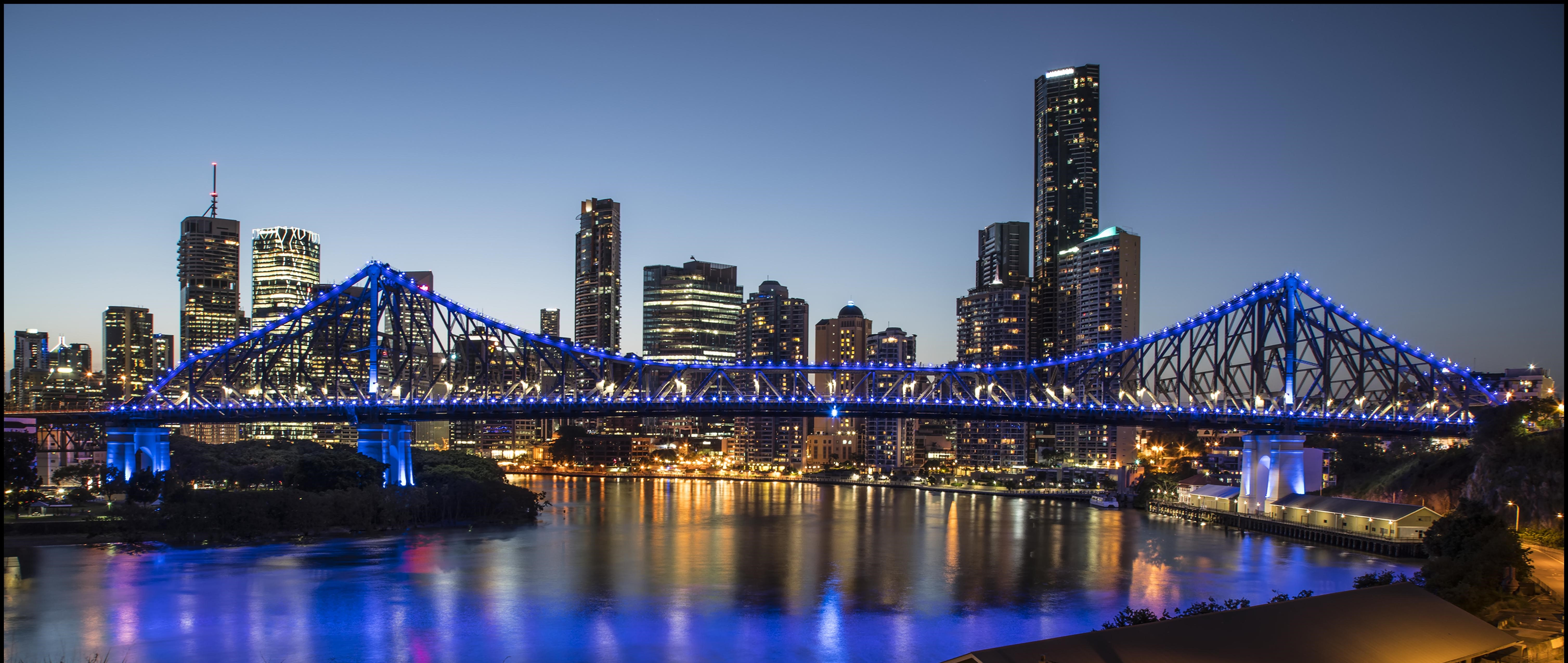
- Skyline of the Brisbane CBD Brisbane City Hall St John's Cathedral Treasury Building Gallery of Modern Art Story Bridge and Brisbane River

- Interactive map of Greater Brisbane
- Coordinates: 27°28′04″S 153°01′41″E
- Country: Australia
- State: Queensland
- Region: South East Queensland
- LGA: City of Brisbane; City of Ipswich; Lockyer Valley Region (partial); Logan City; City of Moreton Bay; Redland City; Scenic Rim Region; Somerset Region
- Location: 973 km (605 mi) N of Sydney; 1,232 km (766 mi) NNE of Canberra; 1,687 km (1,048 mi) NNE of Melbourne; 2,007 km (1,247 mi) NE of Adelaide; 4,238 km (2,633 mi) ENE of Perth
- Established: May 1825; 201 years ago (exact date unknown)

Government
  - State electorate: 41 divisions
  - Federal division: 17 divisions

Area
  - Total: 15,842 km^{2} (6,117 sq mi)
- Elevation: 32 m (105 ft)

Population
  - Total: 2,833,524 (2025) (3rd)
  - Density: 175.5/km^{2} (455/sq mi) (2021 GCCSA)

GDP (nominal)
  - Total: A$177.01 billion (2019) (US$126.6 billion)
  - Per capita: A$70,300 (2019) (US$50,278.93)
- Time zone: UTC+10:00 (AEST)
- County: Stanley, Canning, Cavendish, Churchill, Ward
- Mean max temp: 26.6 °C (79.9 °F)
- Mean min temp: 16.4 °C (61.5 °F)
- Annual rainfall: 1,012 mm (39.8 in)

Brisbane (/ˈbrɪzbən/ BRIZ-bən; Turrbal/Yagara: Meanjin) is the capital and most populous city of the Australian state of Queensland and the third-most populous city in Australia, with a population of about 2.8 million. Brisbane lies at the centre of South East Queensland, a bio-geographical and urban region with an estimated population of 4.1 million as of 2024. The central business district is situated within a peninsula of the Brisbane River approximately 15 kilometres (9 mi) from its mouth at Moreton Bay. Greater Brisbane sprawls across the hilly floodplain of the Brisbane River Valley between the Pacific Ocean and the Taylor and D'Aguilar mountain ranges, encompassing several local government areas (LGAs). The City of Brisbane LGA forms the inner area of Greater Brisbane, and is the most populous local government area in Australia. The demonym of Brisbane is Brisbanite.

The Moreton Bay penal settlement was established in 1824 at Redcliffe as a place for secondary offenders from the Sydney colony, but in May 1825, the settlement moved to North Quay on the banks of the Brisbane River, named for the Governor of New South Wales, Sir Thomas Brisbane. German Lutherans established the first free settlement of Zion Hill at Nundah in 1838, and in 1859, Brisbane was chosen as Queensland's capital when the state separated from New South Wales. During World War II, the Allied command in the South West Pacific was based in the city, along with the headquarters of General Douglas MacArthur of the United States Army.

Brisbane is served by large rail, bus and ferry networks, as well as Brisbane Airport and the Port of Brisbane. With over 36% of its metropolitan population being foreign-born, Brisbane is frequently ranked highly in lists of the world's most liveable cities. Brisbane has hosted major events including the 1982 Commonwealth Games, World Expo 88 and the 2014 G20 summit, and will host the 2032 Summer Olympics and Paralympics.

South Bank and its extensive parklands attract an estimated 16 million visitors each year. The surrounding region includes the UNESCO World Heritage Gondwana Rainforests, the Glass House Mountains, and Moreton Bay which is sheltered by the barrier sand islands of Moreton and North Stradbroke Island. Within the bay lie the historic sites of Teerk Roo Ra and St Helena Island National Park.

== Toponymy ==
Brisbane is named after the Brisbane River, which in turn was named after Thomas Brisbane, the British-born governor of New South Wales from 1821 to 1825. The surname is possibly derived from the Scottish Gaelic bris, meaning 'to break or smash' and the Old English word ban meaning 'bone'. Alternatively, the surname could be derived from either "Braesbane" indicating white hills or "Braesburn" meaning a small rivulet from the hillside. Popular nicknames for Brisbane include Brissie (pronounced "Brizzie"), Brisvegas, and the River City.

Brisbane is also known as Meanjin, Magandjin and other spellings, the Indigenous name likely originally for Gardens Point. There is a difference of opinion between local traditional owners over the spelling, provenance and pronunciation of indigenous names for Brisbane. The daughter of early colonist Tom Petrie recorded that the name "Mi-an-jin" or "Me-an-jin" referred to the area that Brisbane CBD now straddles. Some sources state that the name means 'place shaped as a spike' or 'the spearhead' referencing the shape of the Brisbane River along the area of the Brisbane CBD. A contemporary Turrbal organisation has also suggested it means 'the place of the blue water lilies'. Local Elder Gaja Kerry Charlton posits that Meanjin is based on a European understanding of 'spike', and that the phonetically similar Yagara name Magandjin — after the native tulipwood trees (magan) at Gardens Point — is a more accurate and appropriate Aboriginal name for Brisbane.

== History ==
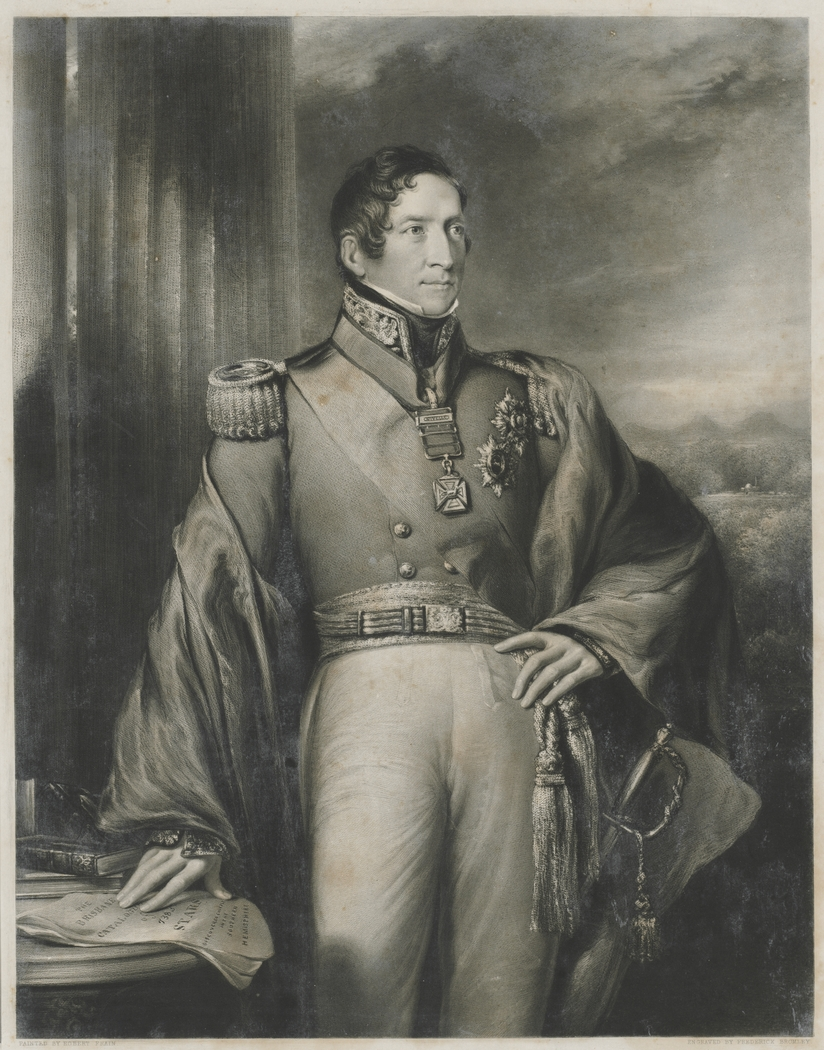
Portrait of Major-General Sir Thomas Brisbane, after whom the city and river were named.

=== Indigenous prehistory ===
The Brisbane region has been inhabited for more than 22,000 years by the Yagara (Yuggera), Turrbal and Quandamooka peoples.

The Brisbane River (Maiwar) formed the heart of cultural, economic and ceremonial life, with major camps at Barambin (York's Hollow), Woolloon-cappem (Kurilpa) and Musgrave Park. The central city peninsula was traditionally known as Meeanjin.

=== 18th and 19th centuries ===
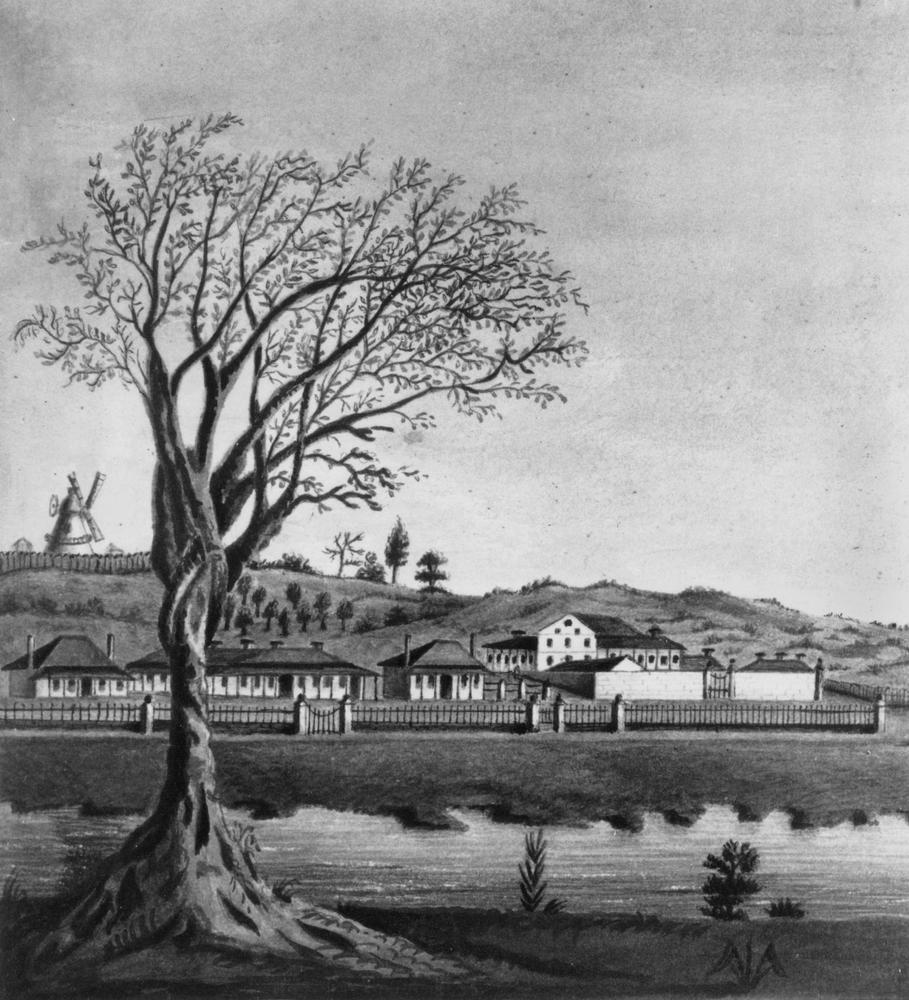
Early drawing of the Moreton Bay settlement, with Old Tower Mill c.1835

Matthew Flinders charted parts of Moreton Bay in 1799, followed by John Oxley in 1823 who located the Brisbane River with the help of castaways and recommended the area for a penal settlement. The first outpost was founded at Redcliffe in 1824 before relocating to North Quay in 1825. Under Captain Patrick Logan, the penal station gained a reputation as one of the harshest in New South Wales. The 1820s and 1830s saw the settlement experience recurrent conflict with neighbouring Indigenous tribes, including organised maize-field raids and the wider Moreton Bay Islands conflict. The settlement closed in 1842, opening the district to free colonisation.

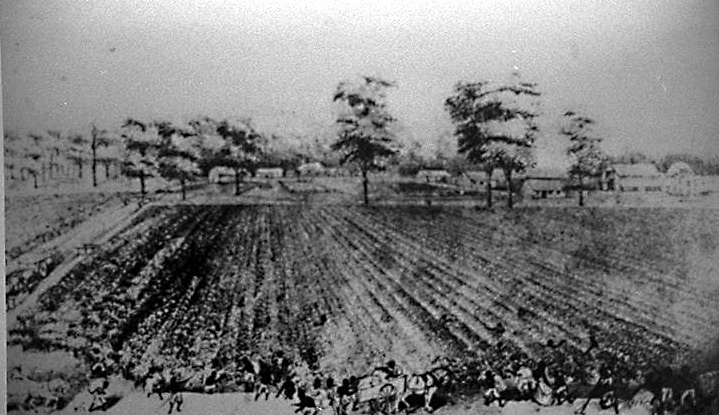
Drawing of indentured South Sea Islanders on a Logan River plantation, c.1865

Free settlement and pastoralists expanded along the river and surrounding valleys throughout the mid-19th century.

The Brisbane district became a major front of the War of Southern Queensland (1843–1855), involving coordinated resistance from Yuggera and Turrbal groups, with support from neighbouring Ningy Ningy people, under leaders such as Dundalli, Yilbung and the Duke of York. Raids and ambushes were carried out across the developing settlement, including at Breakfast Creek, South Brisbane, the Sandgate district and the Pine Rivers. In response, British forces, including detachments of the 99th and later 11th regiment launched several armed operations through York's Hollow between 1846 and 1848.

Brisbane grew as a river port serving pastoral districts and the Moreton Bay islands, while German and Scottish migrants established early agricultural settlements, notably the Zion Hill Mission at Nundah in 1838 and Fortitude Valley named after the Fortitude. Brisbane became the capital of the newly separated Colony of Queensland in 1859. Civic development followed, including the construction of Parliament House and the Treasury Building, expanding wharves and new rail connections linking the town to surrounding pastoral districts.

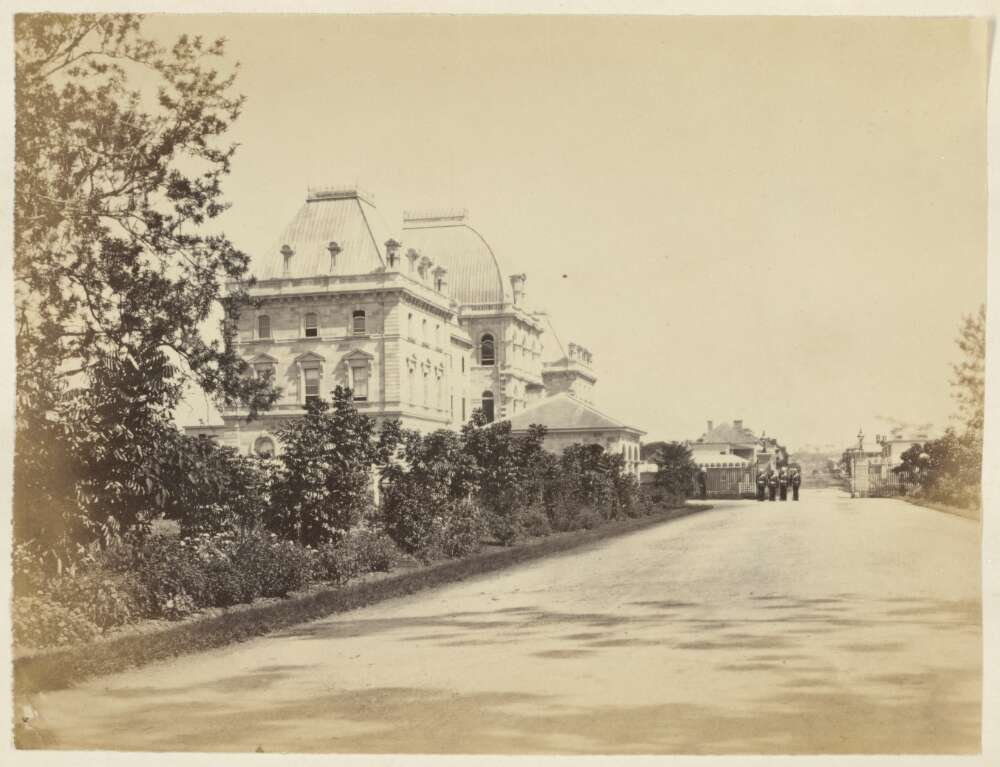
Queensland Parliament under guard, George street c.1869

From the 1860s, Brisbane became a key Western Pacific port in the trade of blackbirded labour, serving as a major point of transit for South Sea Islander indentured labourers transported to plantation districts across Queensland, linking the city to the wider plantation economy of the colony. Although administered as an indenture system, many historians regard the trade as a form of slavery or slavery-like coercion, citing deceptive recruitment practices, restrictions on movement and widespread exploitation.

In the late 19th century, Brisbane had become cosmopolitan for its size, as its position in the western Pacific and persistent labour shortages encouraged earlier and more varied migration streams than most other Australian colonial cities, including German farming families, substantial Scottish and Irish communities, a Chinese quarter at Frog's Hollow, a Jewish congregation, and one of Australia's earliest Russian migrant groups."

Brisbane's late 19th century development was repeatedly shaped by major natural disasters. The city suffered two destructive fires in 1864, which destroyed much of the early commercial centre and led to new building regulations favouring brick over timber construction. Economic hardship in 1866 sparked the "Bread or Blood" protests outside Government House, reflecting wider tensions during the financial crisis of the mid-1860s. Vulnerability to natural hazards continued into the 1890s, when the Great Flood of 1893 inundated large areas of Brisbane, swept away the first Victoria Bridge and became one of the most significant floods in the city's history. Following the destruction of the Victoria Bridge, a temporary ferry service was introduced, but it was later involved in the 1896 Pearl ferry disaster, in which it is estimated half of 80–100 people on board lost their lives.

In the late 19th and early 20th centuries, Queensland emerged as a major centre for the Australian labour movement and democratic socialism, influenced by the shearers' strikes and the trade unions. Brisbane became the capital of the world's first labour movement government with the election of Anderson Dawson in 1899.

=== 20th century ===
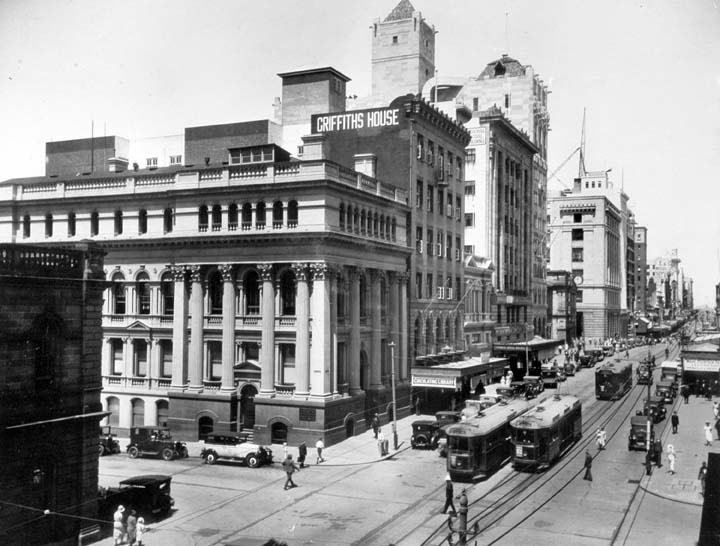
Corner of Queen and Creek street, c.1932

Following Federation in 1901, Brisbane entered the new century as the capital of Queensland, marked by civic celebrations and the laying of the foundation stone for St John's Cathedral.

The early decades of the century were shaped by labour unrest, including the 1912 Brisbane general strike, and by political tensions during the First World War, such as the 1917 raid on the Queensland Government Printing Office, and the Red Flag riots of 1918–19. In 1925 the creation of the City of Brisbane formed Australia's largest municipal authority, followed in 1930 by the opening of Brisbane City Hall, one of the city's most significant public buildings, and later in 1940 with the opening of the Story Bridge.

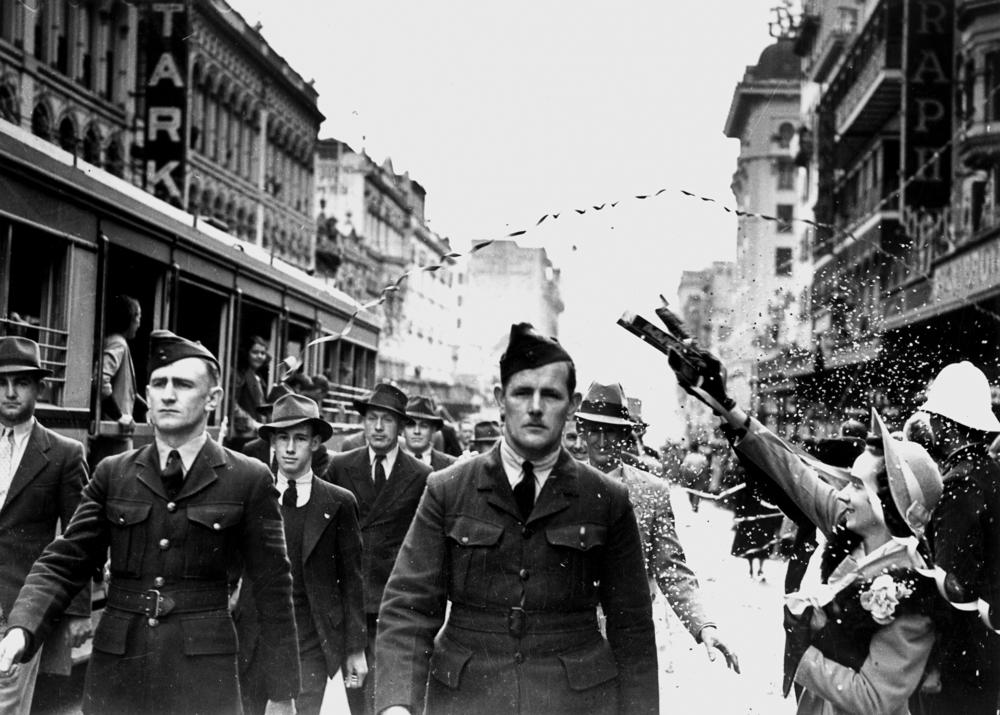
Parade of Royal Australian Air Force servicemen through Queen street, c. 1940

During the Second World War, Brisbane became a major Allied headquarters and logistics centre in the South West Pacific. General Douglas MacArthur established his headquarters in the city at MacArthur Chambers, and large numbers of American and Australian personnel were stationed throughout the metropolitan area. Wartime conditions reshaped daily life, from rationing and rapid military construction to social pressures that culminated in incidents such as the Battle of Brisbane in 1942.

The post-war era brought large-scale immigration, suburban expansion, and rising car ownership. Severe floods such as the 1974 flood caused extensive damage and prompted major changes in water management, including the construction of Wivenhoe Dam.

Under the government of Joh Bjelke-Petersen, Queensland experienced far-reaching restrictions on civil liberties, including the effective banning of street marches and extensive police enforcement, conditions that catalysed widespread civil rights protests and student activism. In response, an artistic counter-cultural movement took shape, and Brisbane's cultural scene became one of the earliest punk rock centres.

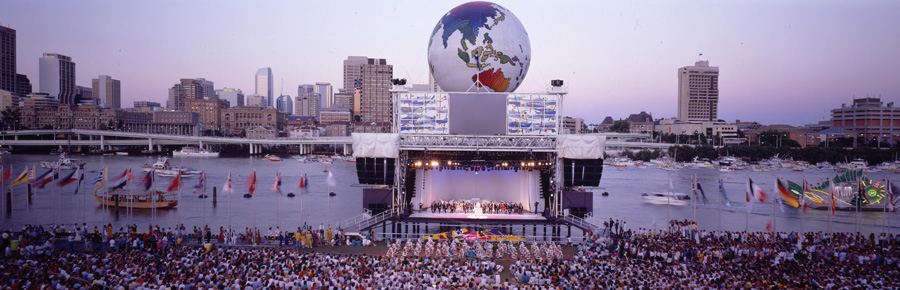
Crowds at World Expo 88, the international exposition that transformed Brisbane's South Bank precinct

The end of the Bjelke-Petersen era was followed by a period of civic and political renewal in Brisbane, as reforms arising from the Fitzgerald Inquiry reshaped policing and governance in the city and supported the expansion of cultural institutions, heritage conservation and urban redevelopment. Following Expo 88, the South Brisbane riverfront was redeveloped into the South Bank Parklands, which opened in 1992 and became one of the city's major cultural precincts.

=== 21st century ===
The early 21st century has seen sustained population growth, inner-city renewal and major transport investment, including the South East Busway, AirportlinkM7, Legacy Way and Cross River Rail. Significant urban redevelopment occurred across the inner city, with expanding high-rise construction and new riverfront precincts such as Howard Smith Wharves and the Queen's Wharf project.

The city also became increasingly multicultural, with sustained migration from Asia and the Pacific contributing to demographic growth in the outer suburbs and the emergence of new cultural and commercial districts across the metropolitan area. Cultural infrastructure grew with the opening of the Gallery of Modern Art (GOMA) in 2006 and the redevelopment of the State Library of Queensland as part of the broader expansion of the Queensland Cultural Centre. Major flood events in the 2011 and 2022 floods renewed focus on resilience and river management, while the severe rainfall associated with Cyclone Alfred in 2025 prompted further review of flood-mitigation planning.

Ongoing development across South Bank and the cultural precinct continued into the 2020s, and Brisbane's selection as host of the 2032 Olympic and Paralympic Games initiated long-term metropolitan planning and redevelopment.

== Geography and environment ==
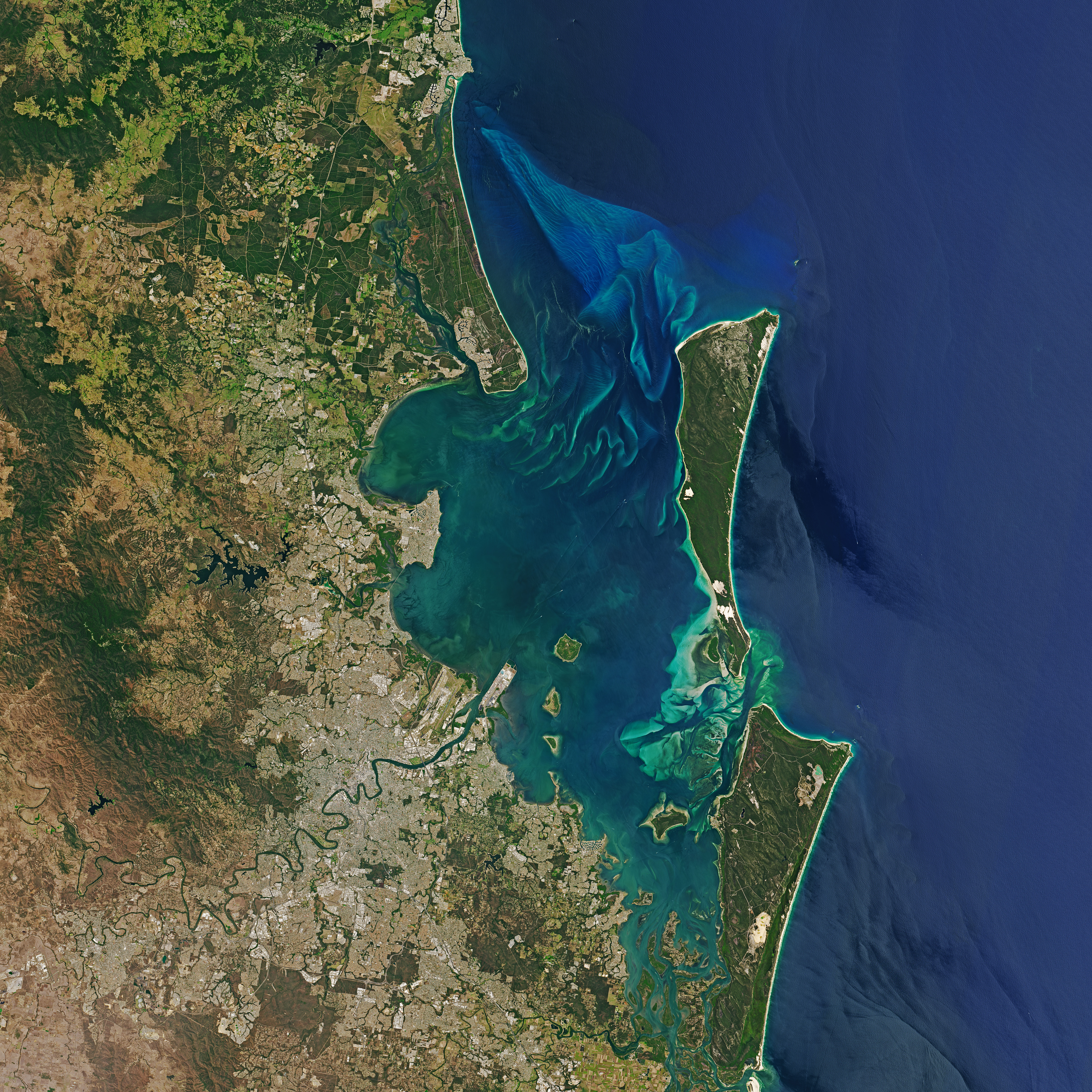
Satellite image of Brisbane metropolitan area taken in 2019

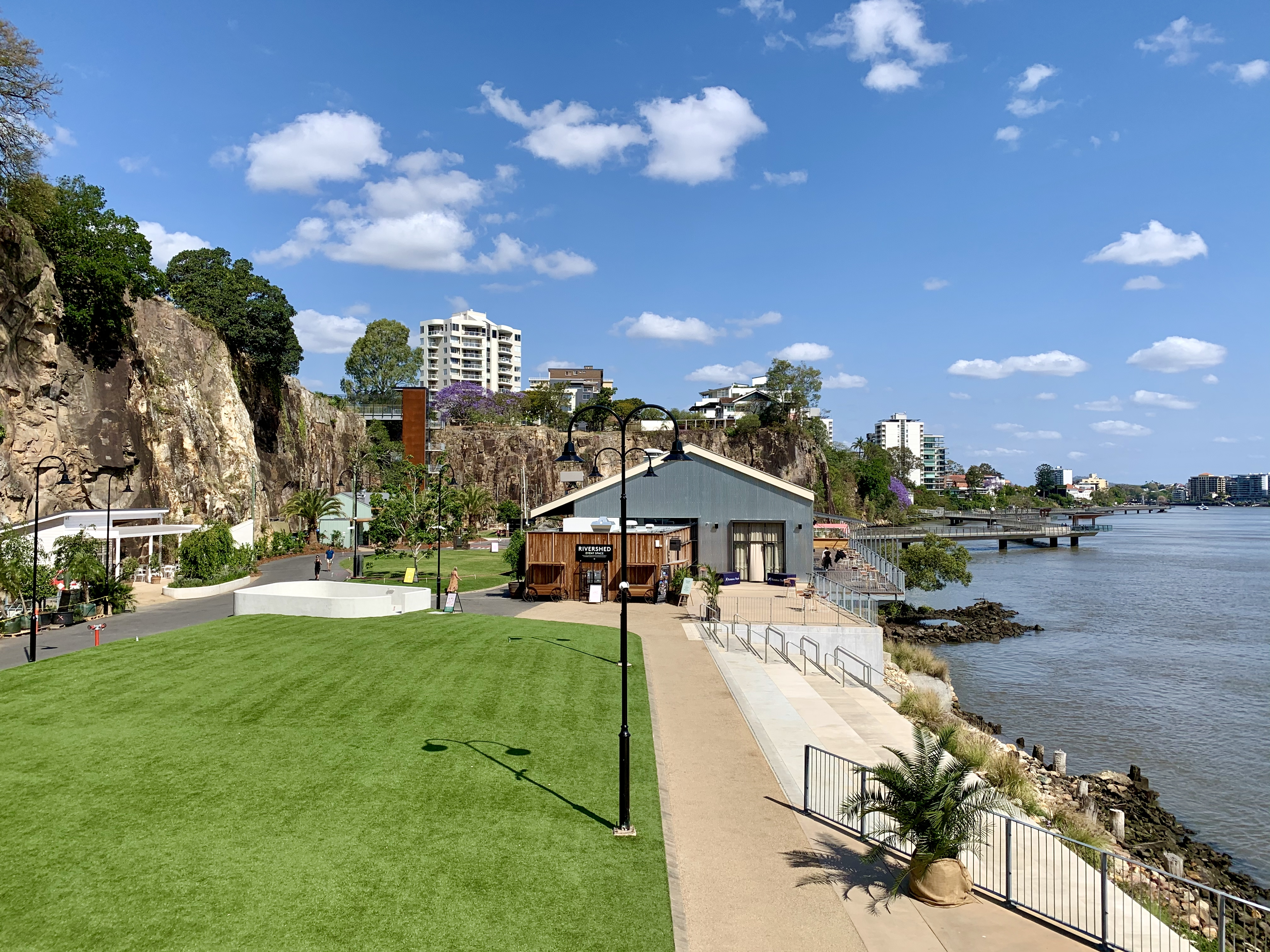
New Farm Cliffs, formed from Brisbane tuff rock, behind Howard Smith Wharves

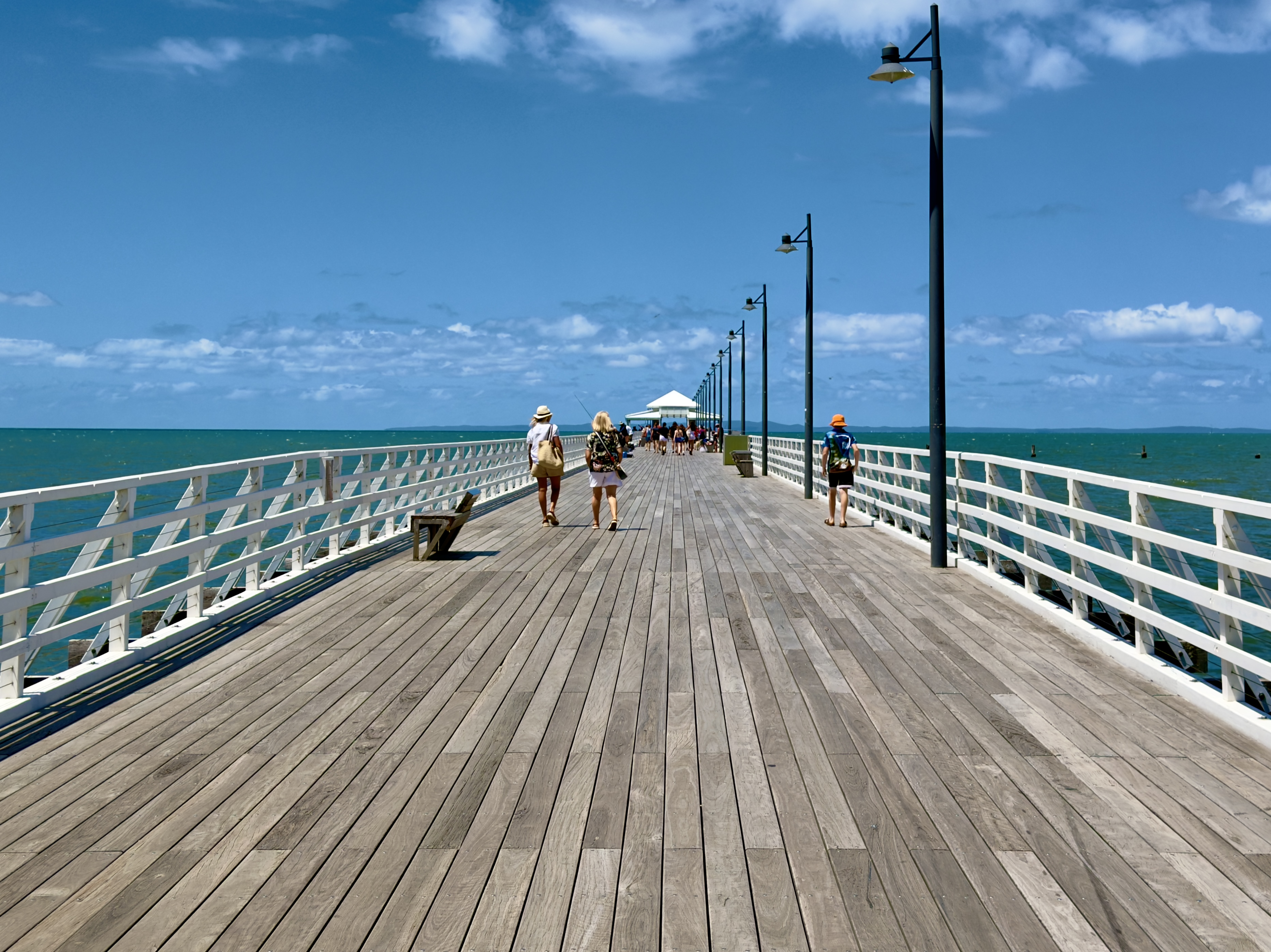
The historic Shorncliffe pier reaches 351 metres into Moreton Bay, making it one of the longest recreational piers in Australia

Brisbane is in the southeast corner of Queensland. The city is centred along the Brisbane River, and its eastern suburbs line the shores of Moreton Bay, a bay of the Coral Sea. The greater Brisbane region is on the coastal plain east of the Great Dividing Range, with the Taylor and D'Aguilar ranges extending into the metropolitan area. Brisbane's metropolitan area sprawls along the Moreton Bay floodplain between the Gold and Sunshine coasts, approximately from Caboolture in the north to Beenleigh in the south, and across to Ipswich in the south west.

The Brisbane River is a wide tidal estuary and its waters throughout most of the metropolitan area are brackish and navigable. The river takes a winding course through the metropolitan area with many steep curves from the southwest to its mouth at Moreton Bay in the east. The metropolitan area is also traversed by several other rivers and creeks including the North Pine and South Pine rivers in the northern suburbs, which converge to form the Pine River estuary at Bramble Bay, the Caboolture River further north, the Logan and Albert rivers in the south-eastern suburbs, and tributaries of the Brisbane River including the Bremer River in the south-western suburbs, Breakfast Creek in the inner-north, Norman Creek in the inner-south, Oxley Creek in the south, Bulimba Creek in the inner south-east and Moggill Creek in the west. The city is on a low-lying floodplain, with the risk of flooding addressed by various state and local government regulations and plans.

The waters of Moreton Bay are sheltered from large swells by Moreton, Stradbroke and Bribie islands, so whilst the bay can become rough in windy conditions, the waves at the Moreton Bay coastline are generally not surfable. Unsheltered surf beaches lie on the eastern coasts of Moreton, Stradbroke and Bribie islands and on the Gold Coast and Sunshine Coast to the south and north respectively. The southern part of Moreton Bay also contains smaller islands such as St Helena Island, Peel Island, Coochiemudlo Island, Russell Island, Lamb Island and Macleay Island.

The city of Brisbane is hilly. The urban area, including the central business district, are partially elevated by spurs of the Herbert Taylor Range, such as the summit of Mount Coot-tha, reaching up to 300 metres (980 ft) and Enoggera Hill. The D'Aguilar National Park, encompassing the D'Aguilar Range, bounds the north-west of Brisbane's built-up area, and contains the taller peaks of Mount Nebo, Camp Mountain, Mount Pleasant, Mount Glorious, Mount Samson and Mount Mee. Other prominent rises in Brisbane are Mount Gravatt, Toohey Mountain, Mount Petrie, Highgate Hill, Mount Ommaney, Stephens Mountain, and Whites Hill, which are dotted across the city.

Much of the rock upon which Brisbane is located is the characteristic Brisbane tuff, a form of welded ignimbrite, which is most prominently found at the Kangaroo Point Cliffs at Kangaroo Point and the New Farm Cliffs on the Petrie Bight reach of the Brisbane River. The stone was used in the construction of historical buildings such as the Commissariat Store and Cathedral of St Stephen, and the roadside kerbs in inner areas of Brisbane are still manufactured of Brisbane tuff.

=== Ecology ===
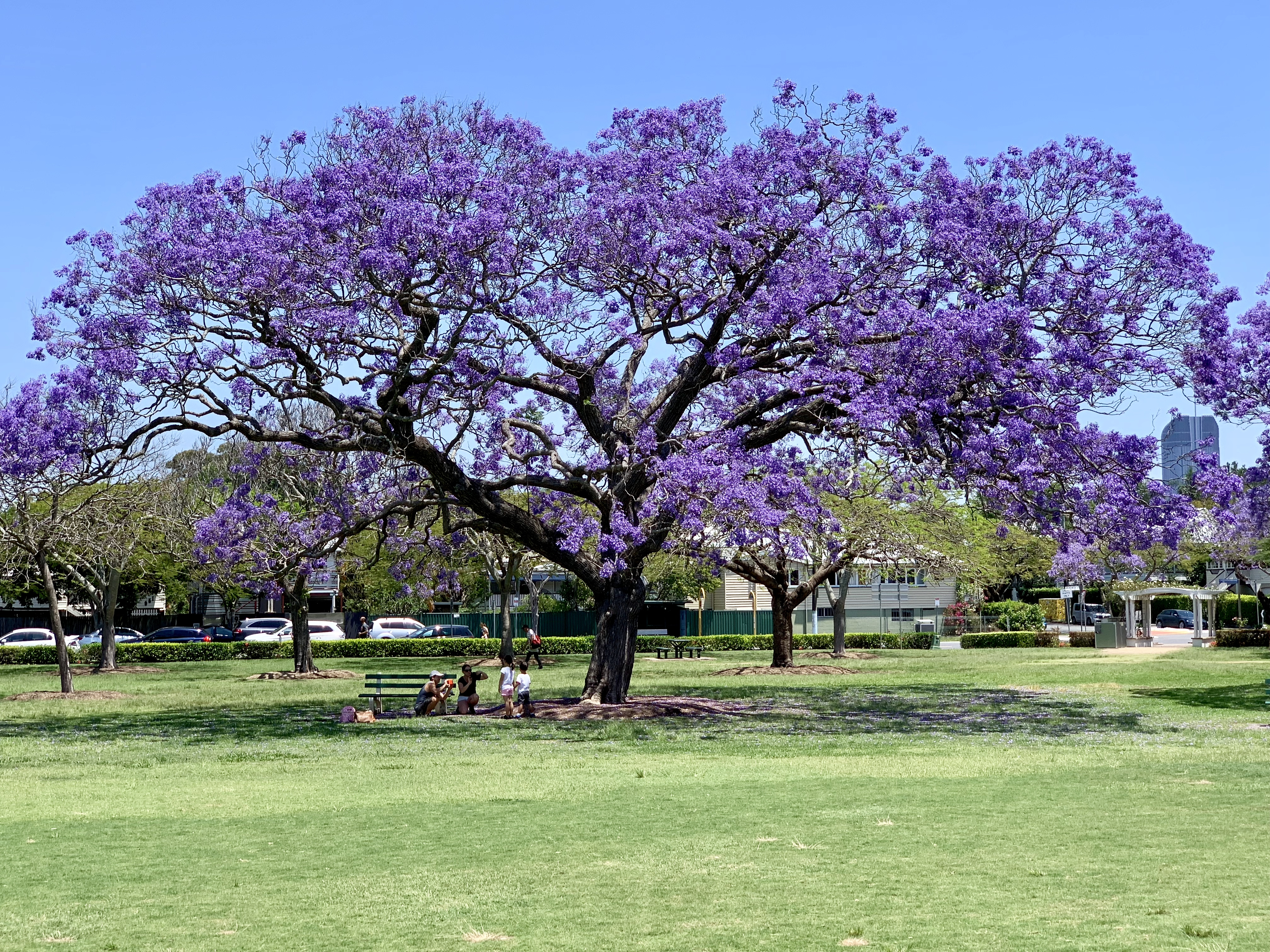
Jacaranda trees in bloom at New Farm Park

Brisbane is located within the South East Queensland biogeographic region, and is home to numerous Eucalyptus varieties. Common trees in Brisbane include the Moreton Bay fig, an evergreen banyan with large buttress roots named for the region which are often lit with decorative lights in the inner city, as well as the jacaranda, a subtropical tree native to South America which line many avenues and parks and bloom with purple flowers during October. Other trees common to the metropolitan area include Moreton Bay chestnut, broad-leaved paperbark, poinciana, weeping lilli pilli and Bangalow palm. Some of the banks of the Brisbane River and Moreton Bay are home to mangrove wetlands. The red poinsettia is the original official floral emblem of Brisbane, however it is native to Central America. An additional floral emblem, the Brisbane wattle, which is native to the Brisbane area, was added in 2023.

Brisbane is home to numerous bird species, with common species including rainbow lorikeets, kookaburras, galahs, Australian white ibises, Australian brushturkeys, Torresian crows, Australian magpies and noisy miners. Common reptiles include common garden skinks, Australian water dragons, bearded dragons and blue-tongued lizards. Common ringtail possums and flying foxes are common in parks and yards throughout the city, as are common crow butterflies, blue triangle butterflies, golden orb-weaver spiders and St Andrew's Cross spiders. The Brisbane River is home to many fish species including yellowfin bream, flathead, Australasian snapper, and bull sharks. The waters of Moreton Bay are home to dugongs, humpback whales, dolphins, mud crabs, soldier crabs, Moreton Bay bugs and numerous shellfish species. The koala and the graceful tree frog are the official faunal emblems of Brisbane, however both are increasingly less common due to the effects of increased development and climate change.

=== Climate ===
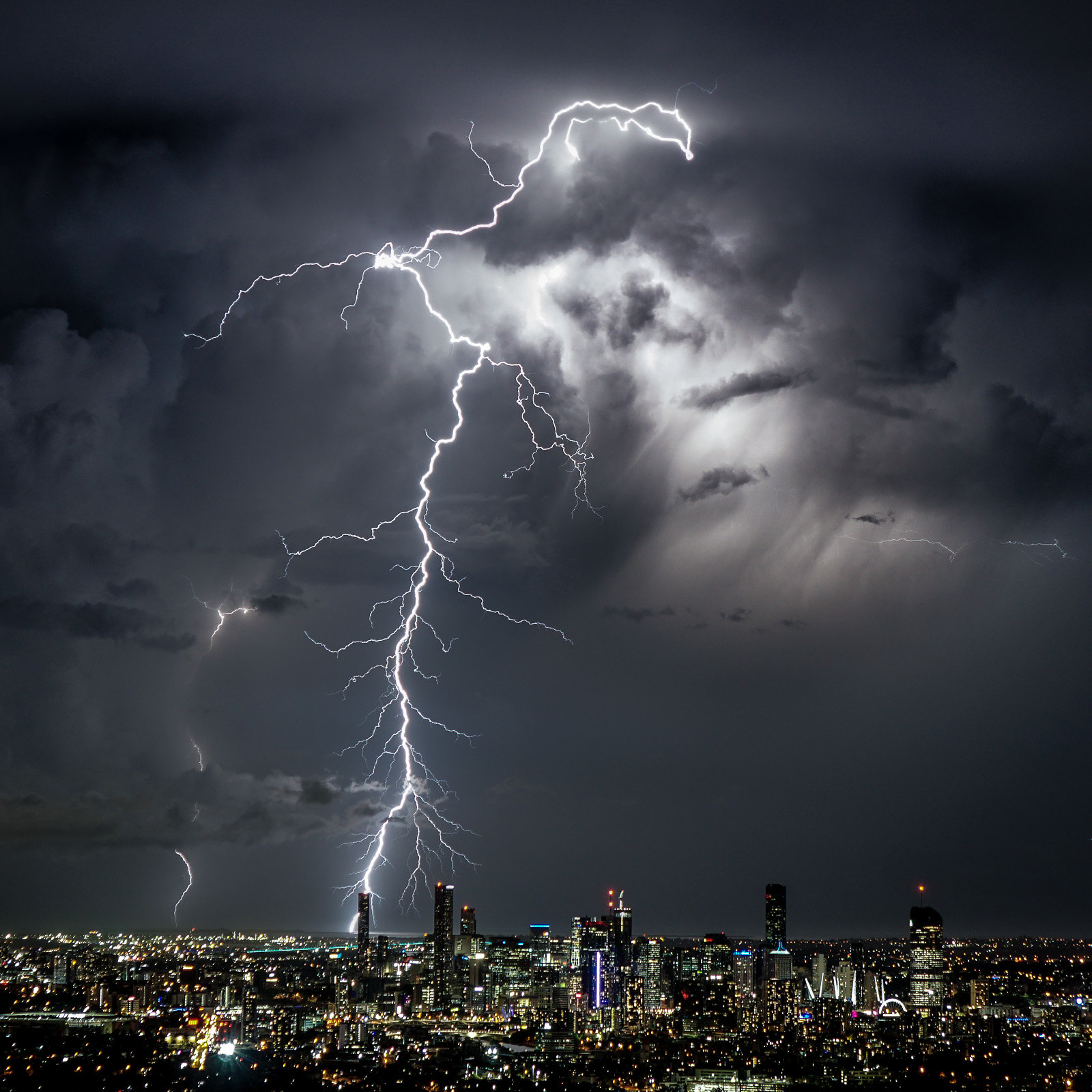
Lightning over the Brisbane city centre, February 2020

Brisbane has a humid subtropical climate (Köppen climate classification: Cfa) with hot, wet summers and moderately drier, mild winters. Brisbane experiences an annual mean minimum of 16.6 °C (62 °F) and mean maximum of 26.6 °C (80 °F), making it Australia's second-hottest capital city after Darwin. Seasonality is not pronounced, and average maximum temperatures of above 26 °C (79 °F) persist from October through to April.

Due to its proximity to the Coral Sea and a warm ocean current, Brisbane's overall temperature variability is somewhat less than most Australian capitals. Summers are long, hot, and wet, but temperatures only occasionally reach 35 °C (95 °F) or more. Eighty percent of summer days record a maximum temperature of 27 to 33 °C (81 to 91 °F). Winters are short and warm, with average maximums of about 22 °C (72 °F); maximum temperatures below 20 °C (68 °F) are rare.

The city's highest recorded temperature was 43.2 °C (109.8 °F) on Australia Day 1940 at the Brisbane Regional Office, with the highest temperature at the current station being 41.7 °C (107.1 °F) on 22 February 2004; but temperatures above 38 °C (100 °F) are uncommon. On 19 July 2007, Brisbane's temperature fell below the freezing point for the first time since records began, registering −0.1 °C (31.8 °F) at the airport station. The city station has never dropped below 2 °C (36 °F), with the average coldest night during winter being around 6 °C (43 °F); however, locations in the west of the metropolitan area such as Ipswich have dropped as low as −5 °C (23 °F) with heavy ground frost.

In 2009, Brisbane recorded its hottest winter day (from June to August) at 35.4 °C (95.7 °F) on 24 August; The average July day however is around 22 °C (72 °F) with sunny skies and low humidity, occasionally as high as 27 °C (81 °F), whilst maximum temperatures below 18 °C (64 °F) are uncommon and usually associated with brief periods of cloud and winter rain. The highest minimum temperature ever recorded in Brisbane was 28.0 °C (82.4 °F) on 29 January 1940 and again on 21 January 2017, whilst the lowest maximum temperature was 10.2 °C (50.4 °F) on 12 August 1954.

Annual precipitation is ample. From November to March, thunderstorms are common over Brisbane, with the more severe events accompanied by large damaging hailstones, torrential rain and destructive winds. To the west of Brisbane, supercell thunderstorms often form during the late spring and summer months. These can include tornadic supercells. On an annual basis, Brisbane averages 124 clear days, with overcast skies more common in the warmer months. Dewpoints in the summer average at around 20 °C (68 °F); the apparent temperature exceeds 30 °C (86 °F) on almost all summer days. Brisbane's wettest day occurred on 21 January 1887, when 465 millimetres (18.3 in) of rain fell on the city, the highest maximum daily rainfall of Australia's capital cities. The wettest month on record was February 1893, when 1,025.9 millimetres (40.39 in) of rain fell. Very occasionally a whole month will pass with no recorded rainfall, the last time this happened was August 1991. The city has suffered four major floods since its founding, in February 1893, January 1974 (partially a result of Cyclone Wanda), January 2011 (partially a result of Cyclone Tasha) and February 2022.

Brisbane is within the southern reaches of the tropical cyclone risk zone. Full-strength tropical cyclones rarely affect Brisbane, but occasionally do so, the most recent being Cyclone Alfred, making landfall as a category 1 around Bribie Island on the 8th of March, 2025, bringing destructive winds and causing significant flooding throughout parts of south-eastern Queensland and north-eastern New South Wales. The more common risk is from ex-tropical cyclones (tropical low systems), which typically bring destructive winds and flooding rains.

The temperature of the ocean ranges from 21 °C (70 °F) in August to 27 °C (81 °F) in February.

Climate data for Brisbane (1999–2024 normals)
Month	Jan	Feb	Mar	Apr	May	Jun	Jul	Aug	Sep	Oct	Nov	Dec	Year
Record high °C (°F)	40.0 (104.0)	41.7 (107.1)	37.9 (100.2)	33.7 (92.7)	30.7 (87.3)	29.0 (84.2)	29.1 (84.4)	35.4 (95.7)	37.0 (98.6)	38.7 (101.7)	38.9 (102.0)	41.2 (106.2)	41.7 (107.1)
Mean daily maximum °C (°F)	30.4 (86.7)	30.2 (86.4)	29.2 (84.6)	27.2 (81.0)	24.5 (76.1)	22.1 (71.8)	22.0 (71.6)	23.5 (74.3)	25.7 (78.3)	27.1 (80.8)	28.3 (82.9)	29.6 (85.3)	26.7 (80.1)
Daily mean °C (°F)	26.1 (79.0)	25.9 (78.6)	24.8 (76.6)	22.3 (72.1)	19.2 (66.6)	17.0 (62.6)	16.3 (61.3)	17.3 (63.1)	19.8 (67.6)	21.8 (71.2)	23.6 (74.5)	25.1 (77.2)	21.6 (70.9)
Mean daily minimum °C (°F)	21.7 (71.1)	21.5 (70.7)	20.3 (68.5)	17.4 (63.3)	13.9 (57.0)	11.8 (53.2)	10.5 (50.9)	11.1 (52.0)	13.9 (57.0)	16.5 (61.7)	18.8 (65.8)	20.6 (69.1)	16.5 (61.7)
Record low °C (°F)	17.0 (62.6)	16.5 (61.7)	12.2 (54.0)	10.0 (50.0)	5.0 (41.0)	5.0 (41.0)	2.6 (36.7)	4.1 (39.4)	7.0 (44.6)	8.8 (47.8)	10.8 (51.4)	14.0 (57.2)	2.6 (36.7)
Average precipitation mm (inches)	141.1 (5.56)	181.9 (7.16)	129.3 (5.09)	60.5 (2.38)	69.8 (2.75)	56.9 (2.24)	30.4 (1.20)	34.6 (1.36)	29.7 (1.17)	85.8 (3.38)	100.1 (3.94)	140.0 (5.51)	1,048.2 (41.27)
Average rainy days (≥ 1 mm)	8.8	9.7	9.7	7.0	6.0	6.0	4.0	3.7	3.9	7.2	7.9	8.9	82.8
Average afternoon relative humidity (%)	57	59	57	54	49	52	44	43	48	51	56	57	52
Mean monthly sunshine hours	267	235	233	237	239	198	239	270	267	270	273	264	2,989
Percentage possible sunshine	63	65	62	69	71	63	73	78	74	68	67	62	68
Average ultraviolet index	13	12	10	7	5	4	4	5	7	10	12	13	9
Source: Bureau of Meteorology

== Urban structure ==
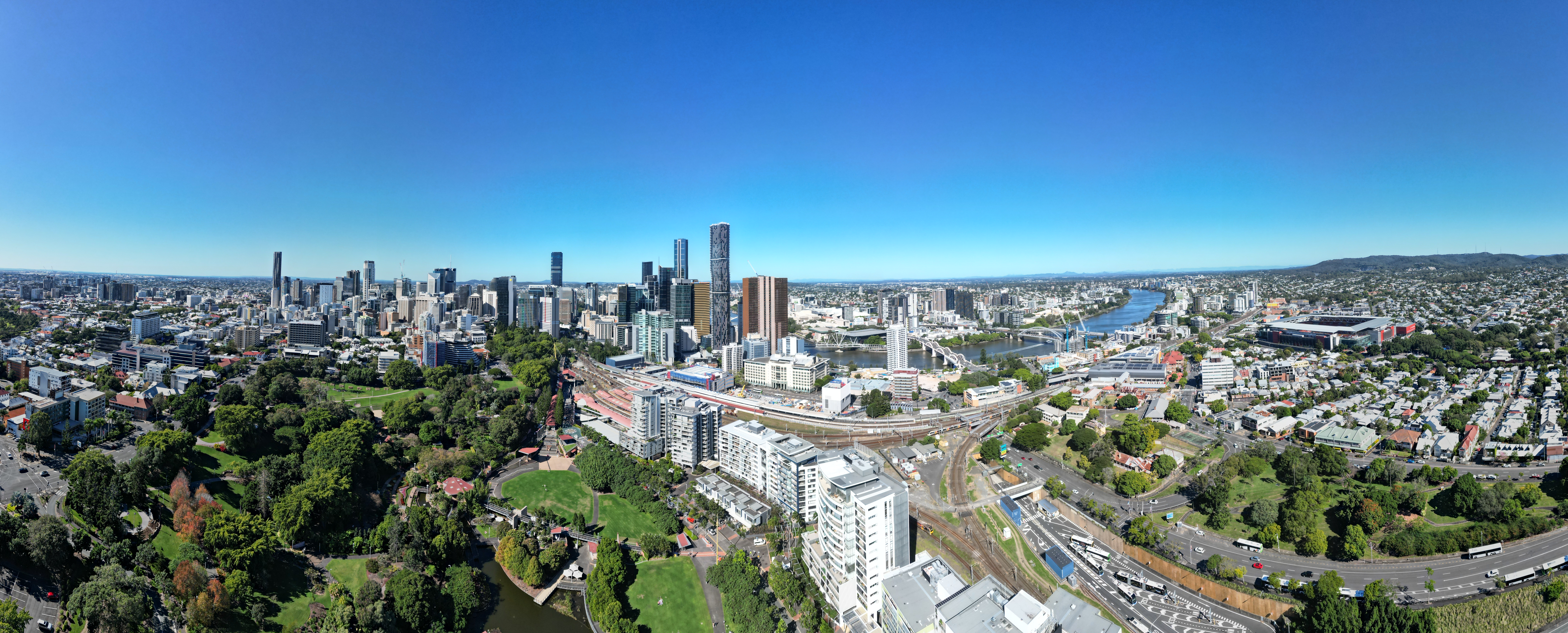
Aerial panorama of Brisbane city from Roma Parklands

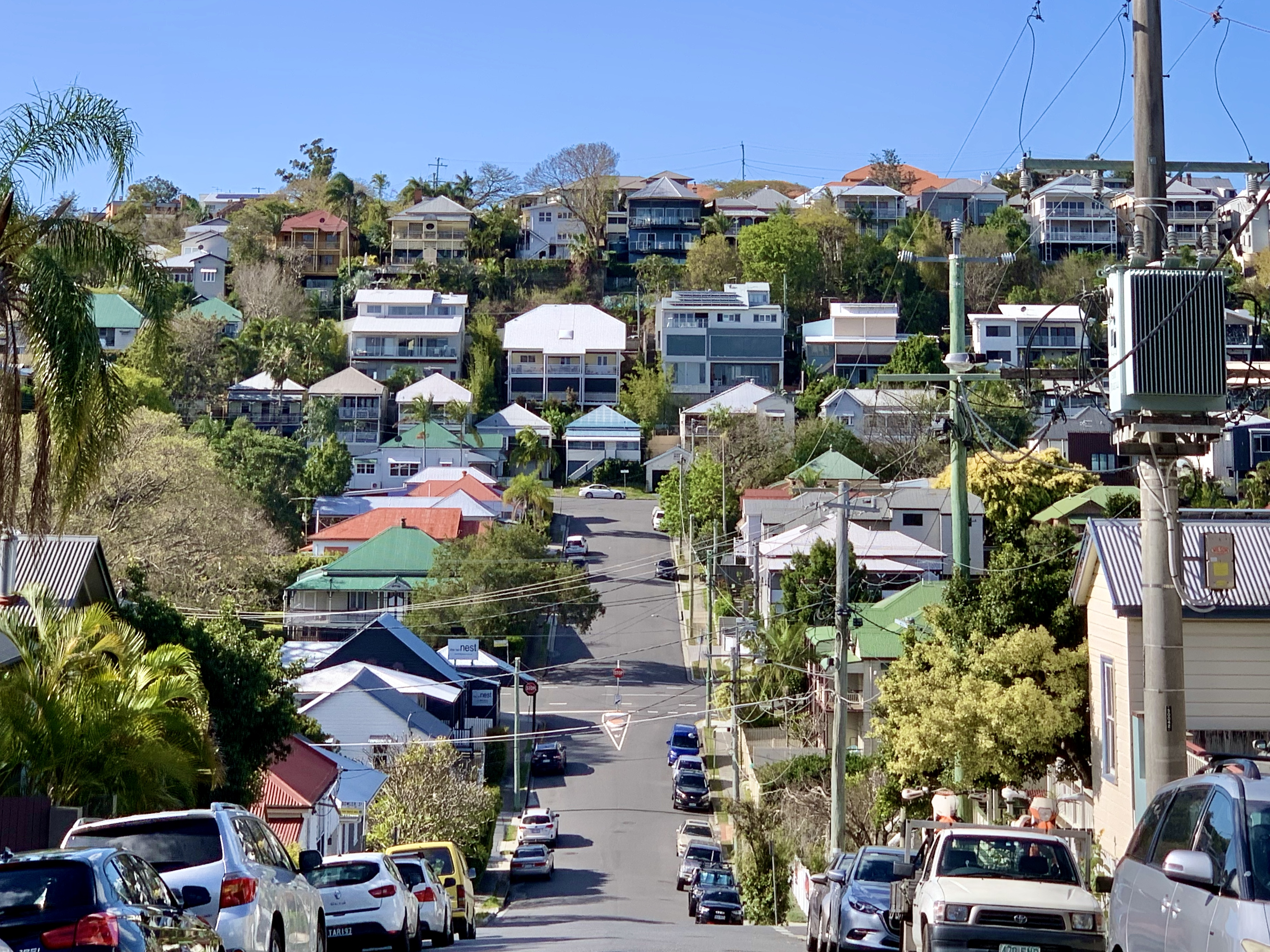
Paddington was the inspiration for the TV series Bluey

The Brisbane CBD and surrounds from the Mount Coot-tha Lookout in the Taylor Range

The Brisbane central business district (CBD, colloquially referred to as "the city") lies in a curve of the Brisbane river. The CBD covers 2.2 square kilometres (0.85 sq mi) and is walkable. Most central streets are named after members of the House of Hanover. Queen Street (named in honour of Queen Victoria) is Brisbane's traditional main street and contains its largest pedestrian mall, the Queen Street Mall. Streets named after female members (Adelaide, Alice, Ann, Charlotte, Elizabeth, Margaret, and Mary) run parallel to Queen Street and perpendicular to streets named after male members (Albert, Edward, George, and William).

The CBD's squares include King George Square, Post Office Square and ANZAC Square (home to the city's central war memorial).

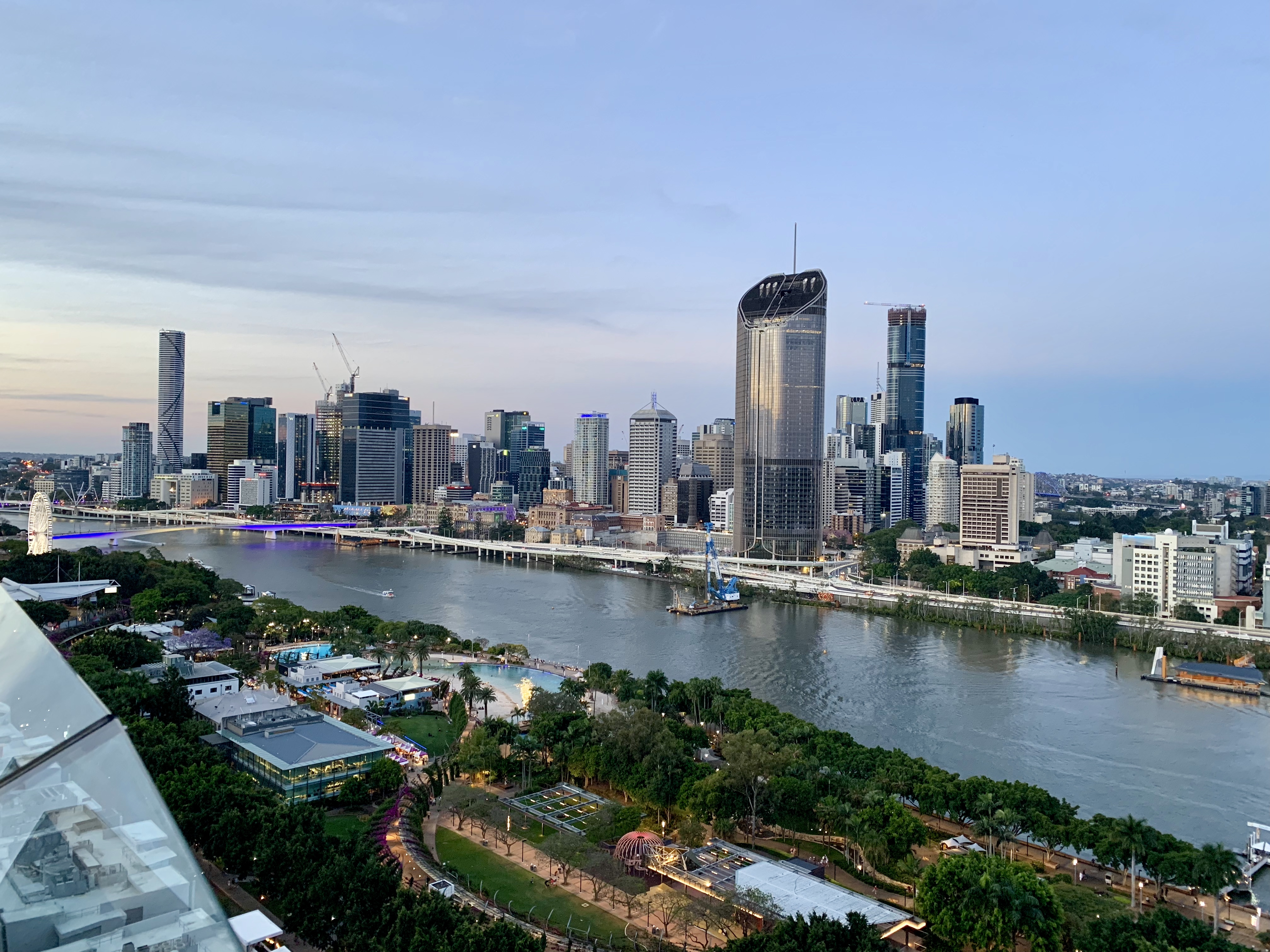
The CBD and South Bank fronts the Brisbane River

At the broadest level, Brisbane's metropolitan area is informally divided into the northside and the southside, with the dividing line being the Brisbane River, as crossing one of the 15 bridges across the river is required to travel to the opposite side by land transport. Due to the river's winding trajectory, this results in many areas which are south of the CBD being classified as located in the northside, and vice versa. At a more specific level, the metropolitan area contains informal regions including the northern, southern, eastern and western suburbs, the bayside suburbs along the Moreton Bay coastline, and the Moreton Bay, Redland, Logan and Ipswich regions in the outer north, east, south and west respectively.

Greater Brisbane had a density of 159 inhabitants per square kilometre (410/sq mi) in 2021. Like most Australian state capital cities, Brisbane has a sprawling metropolitan area which takes in excess of one hour to traverse either north to south or east to west by car without traffic.

From the 1970s onwards, there has been a large increase in the construction of apartment developments, including mid-rise and high rise buildings, which has quickened in the 21st century. At the 2021 census, 73.4% of residents lived in separate houses, 14.7% lived in apartments, and 11.4% lived in townhouses, terrace houses, or semidetached houses.

=== Metropolitan Area ===
Greater Brisbane extends beyond the boundaries of the City of Brisbane local government area (LGA) and encompasses a number of surrounding urban centres and residential communities in South East Queensland. The metropolitan area includes the five principal LGAs of Brisbane, Ipswich, Logan, Moreton Bay and Redland. These areas are connected through transport networks, employment, housing and other regional services, although each local government area retains its own council and administrative responsibilities.

The Australian Bureau of Statistics defines Greater Brisbane as a Greater Capital City Statistical Area (GCCSA). This statistical region represents the broader area associated with Brisbane's population and economic connections and includes parts of several surrounding regional council areas. Its boundaries do not necessarily correspond to the continuous built-up urban area.

==== Brisbane ====
The City of Brisbane forms the central part of the metropolitan area and is administered by Brisbane City Council. It contains the central business district, major commercial and employment centres, established residential suburbs and extensive suburban development. Brisbane also serves as the principal administrative, economic and cultural centre of South East Queensland.

==== Ipswich ====
The City of Ipswich is located west of Brisbane and forms a major urban centre within the metropolitan area's western growth corridor. Its principal urban centres include Ipswich, Springfield and Ripley Valley. The local government area contains established residential neighbourhoods, industrial precincts and rapidly developing communities, with population growth contributing to increased demand for housing, infrastructure and public transport.

==== Logan ====
The City of Logan lies south of Brisbane, between the Brisbane and Ipswich urban areas and the Gold Coast. Its major urban centres include Logan Central, Beenleigh, Browns Plains and Springwood. Logan contains established residential suburbs, commercial centres and industrial areas, alongside rural and semi-rural localities.

==== Moreton Bay ====
The City of Moreton Bay is located north of Brisbane and includes a combination of suburban, coastal and semi-rural communities. Major population centres include the Redcliffe Peninsula, Strathpine, North Lakes and Caboolture. The local government area has experienced substantial residential development, particularly in its northern growth areas, and is connected to Brisbane through road and rail networks.

==== Redland ====
Redland City is located east and south-east of Brisbane, bordering Moreton Bay. Its mainland population centres include Cleveland, Capalaba and Redland Bay. The local government area also includes several islands, including North Stradbroke Island, Coochiemudlo Island and the Southern Moreton Bay Islands. Redland contains established residential communities, coastal settlements, conservation areas and significant natural environments.

=== Parklands ===
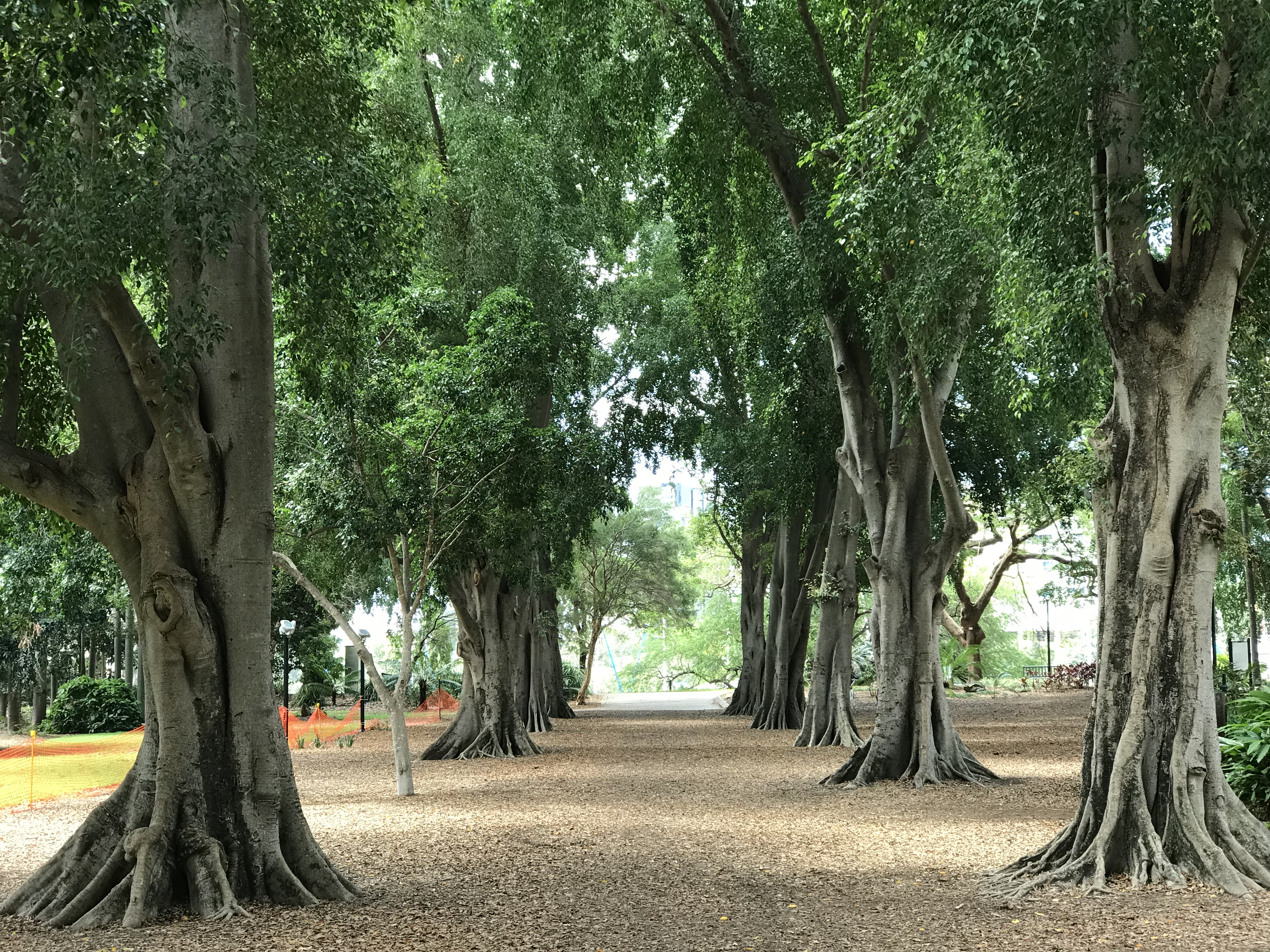
Moreton Bay figs at the City Botanic Gardens

Brisbane's major parklands include the riverside City Botanic Gardens at Gardens Point, Roma Street Parkland, the 27-hectare Victoria Park at Spring Hill and Herston, South Bank Parklands along the river at South Bank, the Brisbane Botanic Gardens at Mount Coot-tha and the riverside New Farm Park at New Farm.

There are many national parks surrounding the Brisbane metropolitan area. The D'Aguilar National Park is a major national park along the northwest of the metropolitan area in the D'Aguilar Range. The Glass House Mountains National Park is located to the north of the metropolitan area in the Glass House Mountains and provides green space between the Brisbane metropolitan area and the Sunshine Coast. The Tamborine National Park at Tamborine Mountain is located in the Gold Coast hinterland to the south of the metropolitan area.

The eastern metropolitan area is built along the Moreton Bay Marine Park, encompassing Moreton Bay. Significant areas of Moreton, North Stradbroke and Bribie islands also covered by the Moreton Island National Park, Naree Budjong Djara National Park and the Bribie Island National Park respectively. The Boondall Wetlands in the suburb of Boondall include 1,100 hectares of wetlands which are home to mangroves and shorebirds as well as walking tracks.

Aerial view of inner Brisbane with landmarks marked

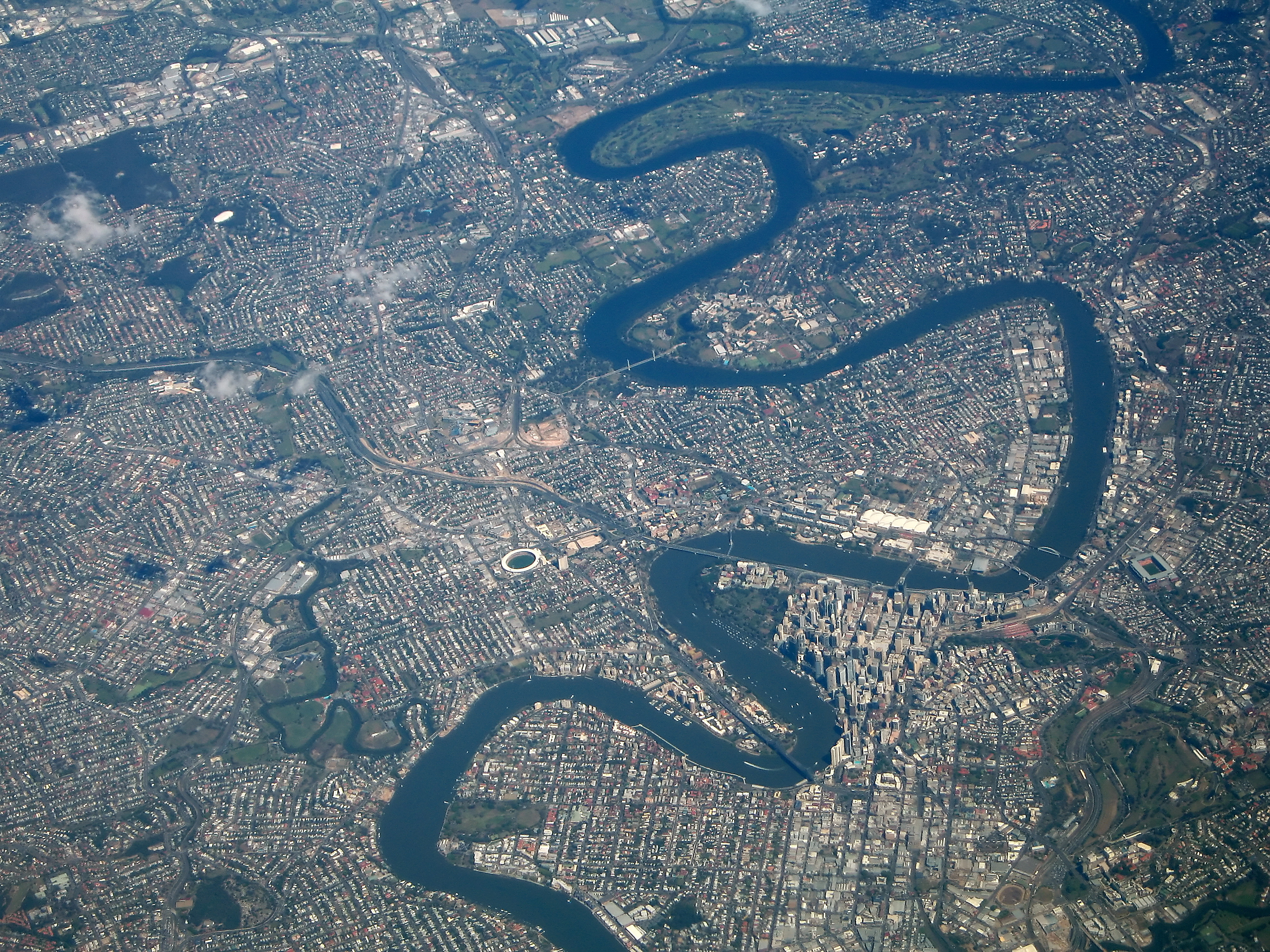

1	Walter Taylor Bridge (road) (left), Albert Bridge (rail) (centre), unnamed bridge (rail) (right), Jack Pesch Bridge (far right)
2	Eleanor Schonell Bridge (Green Bridge) (pedestrians, pedal cycles, buses)
3	Merivale Bridge (rail)
4	Grey Street Bridge (William Jolly Bridge) (road)
5	Victoria Bridge
6	Captain Cook Bridge
7	Story Bridge
8	Pacific Motorway
9	Suncorp Stadium (Lang Park) (Rugby league ground)
10	Norman Creek (Anglican Church Grammar School)
11	Oxley Creek
12	Brisbane River
13	Indooroopilly Shoppingtown
14	"The Gabba" (Brisbane Cricket Ground)
15	South Bank arts and recreation precinct
16	Central business district
17	University of Queensland (UQ) St Lucia Campus

18	City Botanic Gardens
19	Queensland University of Technology (QUT) Gardens Point Campus
20	Goodwill Bridge (pedestrians and pedal cycles)
21	The Royal Brisbane and Women's Hospital
22	Mater Private Hospital
23	Roma Street Rail Station
24	Roma Street Parkland
25	New Farm Park and Powerhouse
26	Victoria Park Golf Course
27	Brisbane Exhibition Ground
28	Brisbane Riverwalk
29	Inner City Bypass (rail) (left) (road) (right)
30	Indooroopilly Golf Course
31	Howard Smith Wharves
32	Eagle Street Pier
33	Queen Street Mall

=== Architecture ===
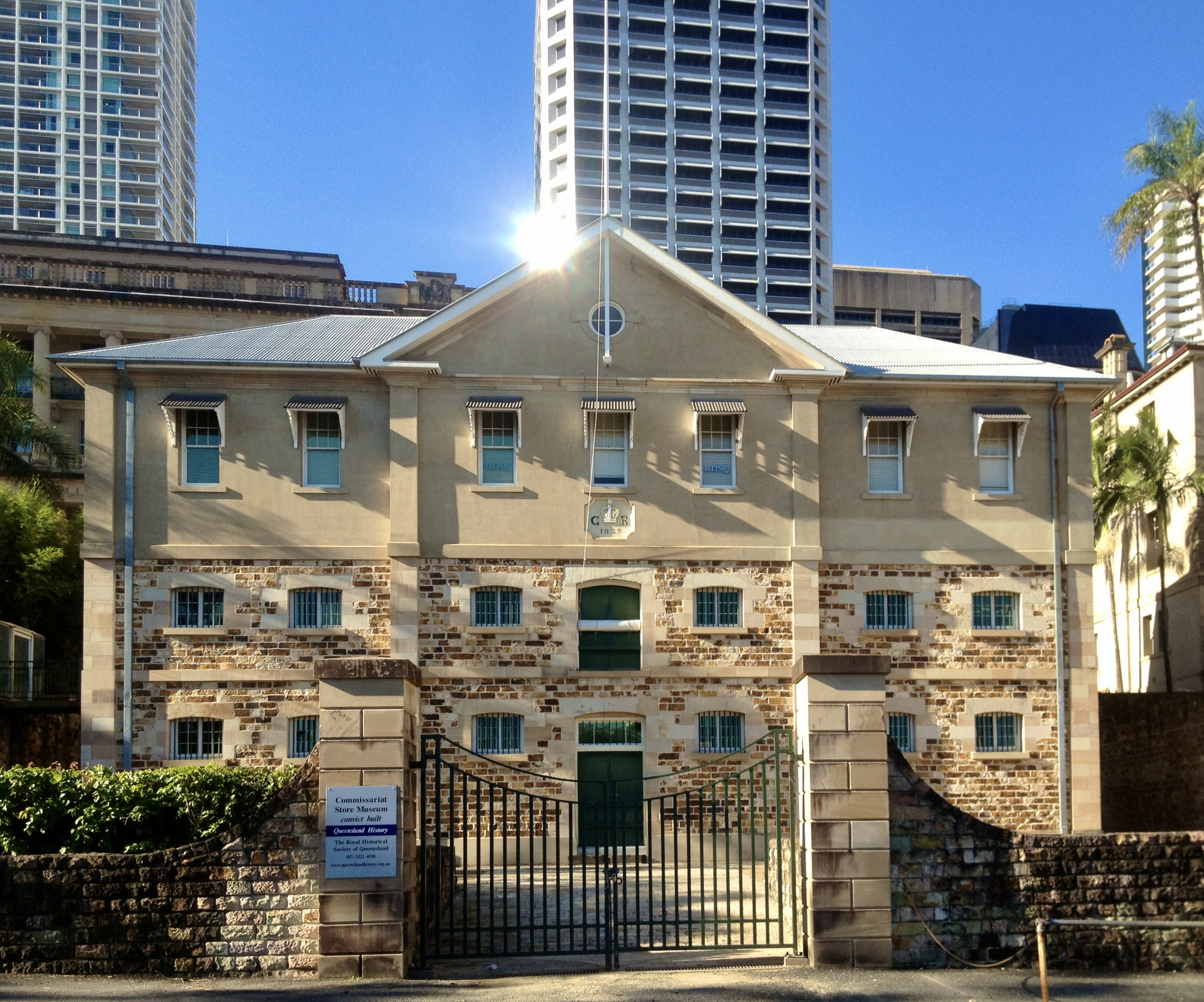
The Commissariat Store dates back to 1828 and was built by convicts.

Brisbane has a number of heritage buildings, some of which date back to the 1820s, including The Old Windmill in Wickham Park, built by convict labour in 1824, which is the oldest surviving building in Brisbane, and the Commissariat Store on William Street, built by convict labour in 1828, which was originally used as a grain house, and is now the home of the Royal Historical Society of Brisbane and contains a museum. Other 19th and early 20th-century buildings of architectural significance include the Treasury Building, City Hall, Customs House, Land Administration Building, MacArthur Chambers, The Mansions, National Australia Bank Building, the Old Museum Building and the Federation-style People's Palace, a former temperance hotel on Edward Street.

One of the oldest synagogues in the Queensland area is the Brisbane Synagogue located on Margaret Street in Brisbane city. This historic synagogue can be attributed as the "centerpiece of the Jewish community's presence in the state" It was established in 1866 and designed by architect Arthur Morry. Another architect by the name of Andrea Stombuco has also been credited as a designer of the synagogue by previous members of the community. The architectural design of this historic synagogue is in the style of Neo-Moorish also known as Byzantine style.

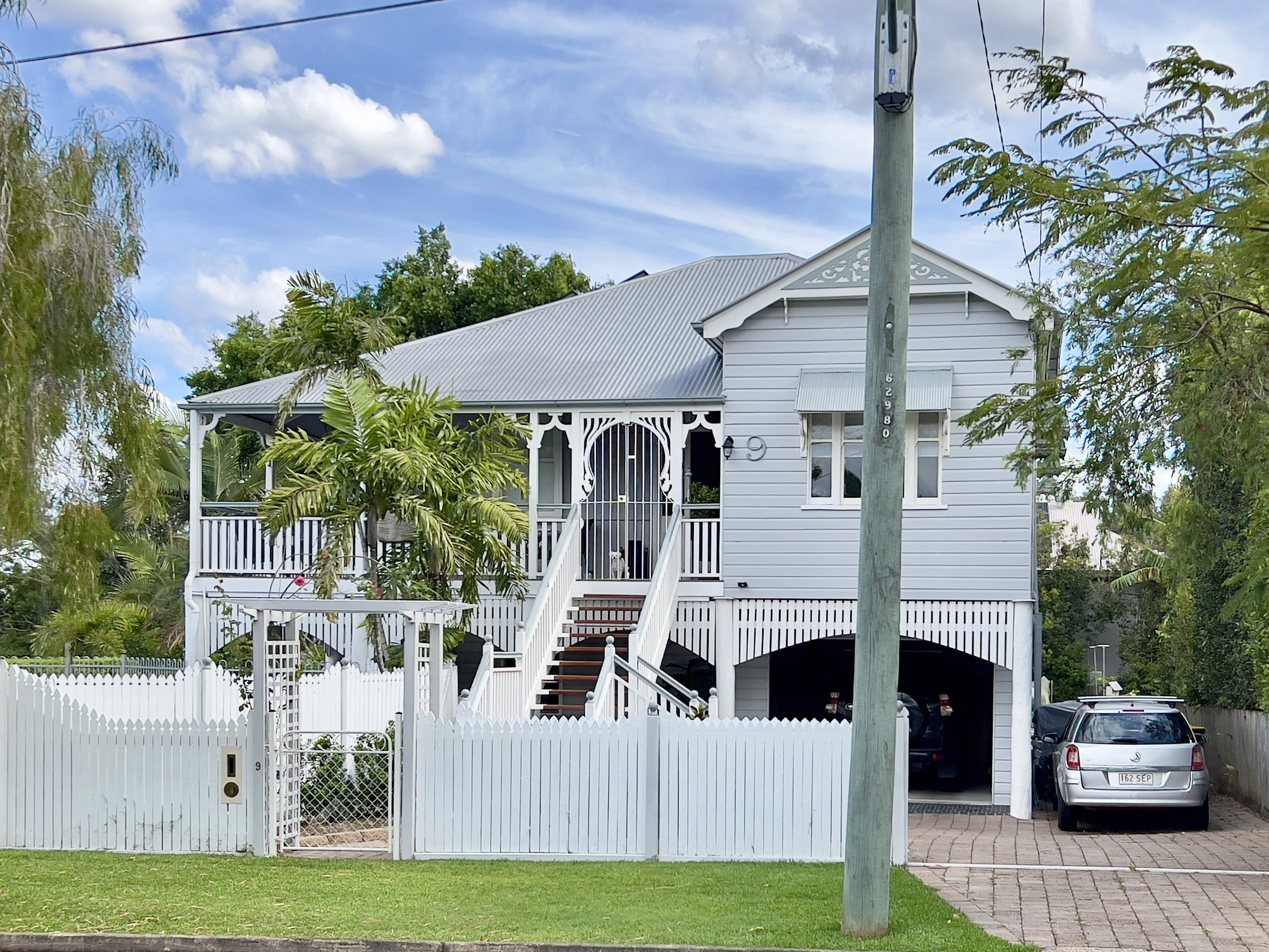
Queenslander-style house in Sherwood, a suburb of Brisbane

Queenslander-style housing is common in Brisbane. Queenslander homes typically feature timber construction with large verandahs, gabled corrugated iron roofs, and high ceilings. Most of these houses are elevated on stumps (also called stilts), traditionally built of timber, which allow for a void under the houses which aids in cooling. The relatively low cost of timber in south-east Queensland meant that until recently, most residences were constructed of timber, rather than brick or stone. Early legislation decreed a minimum size for residential blocks leading to few terrace houses being constructed in Brisbane. The high-density housing that historically existed came in the form of miniature Queenslander-style houses which resemble the much larger traditional styles, but are sometimes only one-quarter the size. These houses are most common in the inner-city suburbs.

Brisbane is home to several of Australia's tallest buildings. All of Brisbane's skyscrapers (buildings with a height greater than 150 metres or 490 feet) are located within the CBD, but the inner suburbs are also home to a number of high-density buildings, Torbreck being the first high-rise and mix-use residential development in Queensland. Brisbane's 91-metre City Hall was the city's tallest building for decades after its completion in 1930 and was finally surpassed in 1970, which marked the beginning of the widespread construction of high-rise buildings.

Brisbane's tallest building is currently Brisbane Skytower, which has a height of 270 metres (890 ft). Architecturally prominent skyscrapers include the Harry Seidler-designed Riparian Plaza, One One One Eagle Street, which incorporates LED lighting resembling the buttress roots of the Moreton Bay fig, and 1 William Street, the headquarters of the Queensland Government.

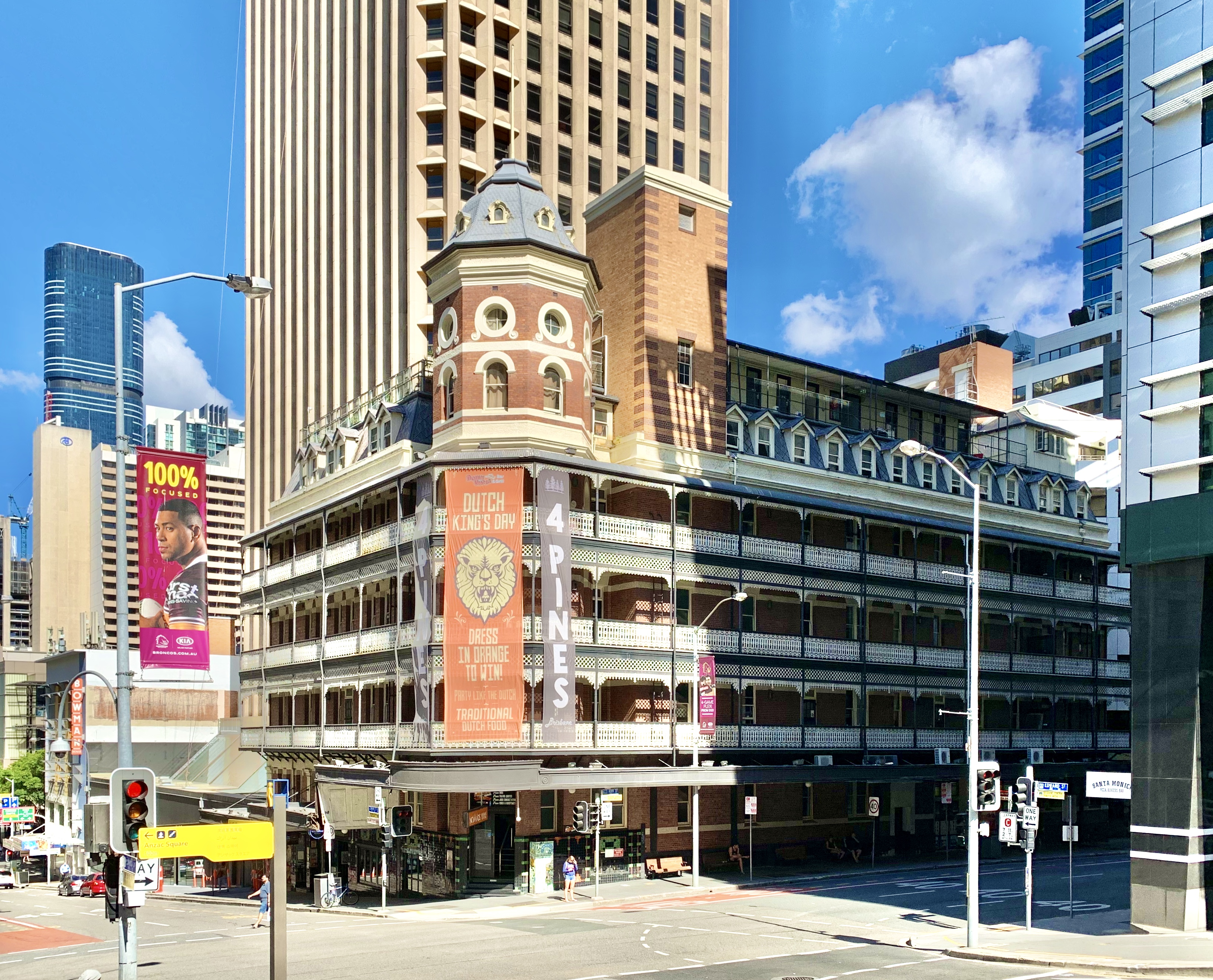
Former temperance hotel, the People's Palace, built in the Federation Filigree style between 1910 and 1911

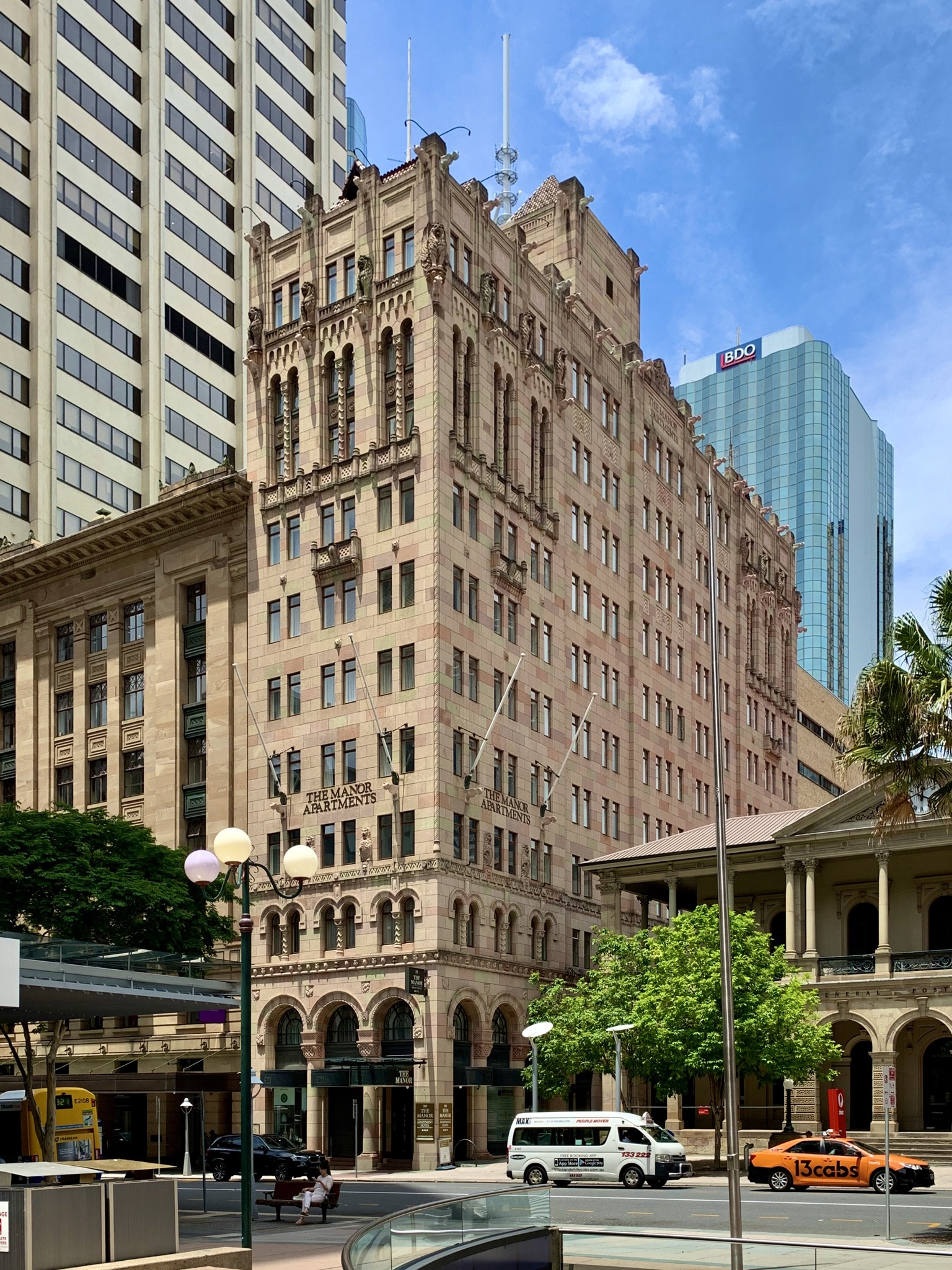
Manor Apartment Hotel, completed in 1931

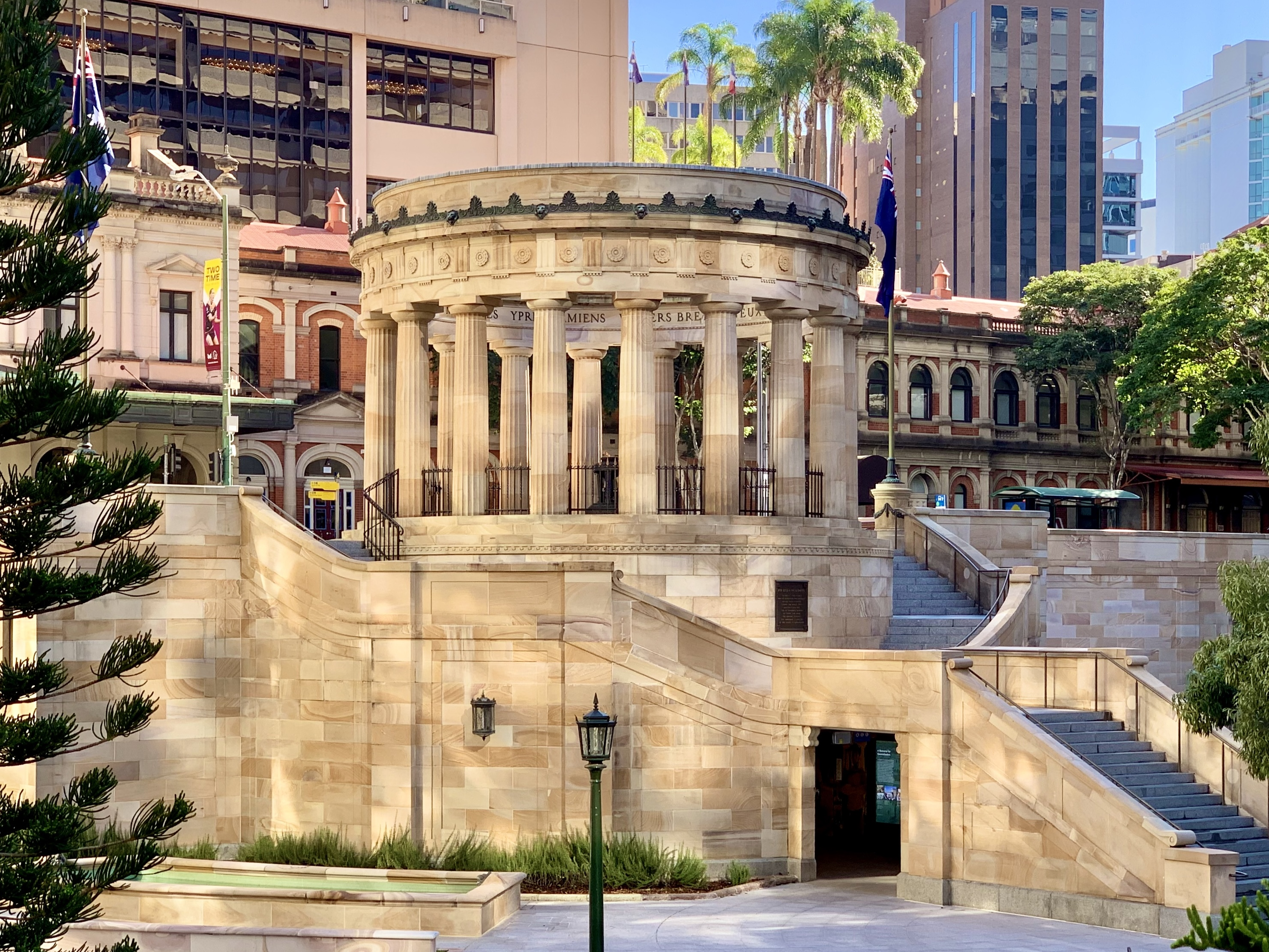
Shrine of Remembrance at ANZAC Square, a major memorial in Brisbane

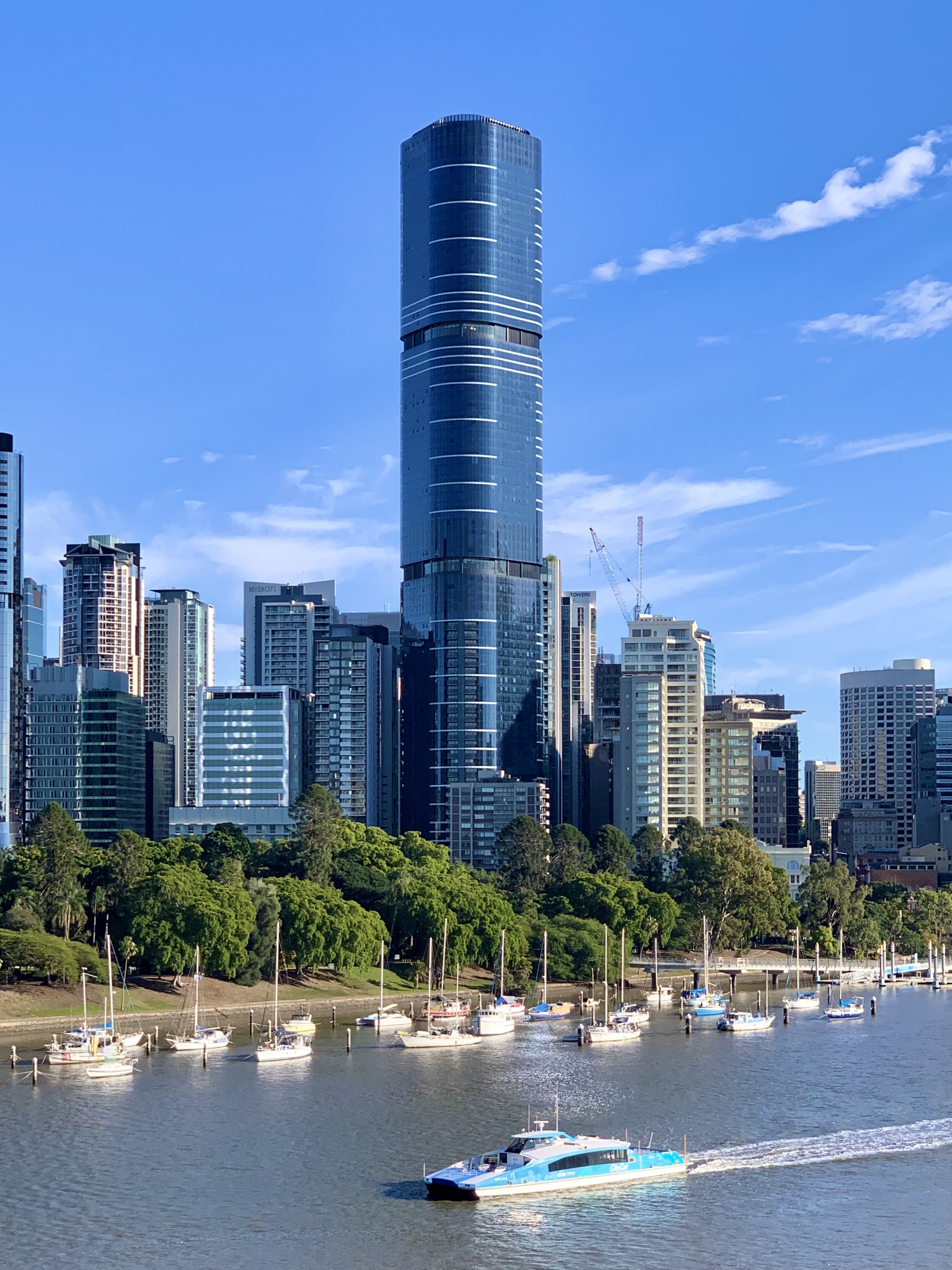
Brisbane Skytower, Brisbane's tallest building

== Demographics ==
Brisbane's Greater Capital City Statistical Area includes the Local Government Areas of City of Brisbane, City of Ipswich, City of Moreton Bay, Logan City and Redland City, as well as parts of Lockyer Valley Region, Scenic Rim Region and Somerset Region, which form a continuous metropolitan area. The Australian Bureau of Statistics estimates that the population of Greater Brisbane is 2,833,524 as of June 2025, making it the third-largest city in Australia.

=== Ancestry and immigration ===
Place of birth (2021)
Birthplace (Note: In accordance with the Australian Bureau of Statistics source, England, Scotland, Mainland China and the Special Administrative Regions of Hong Kong and Macau are listed separately.)	Population
Australia	1,726,655
New Zealand	111,649
England	95,284
India	51,650
Mainland China	41,978
Philippines	27,907
South Africa	26,918
Vietnam	20,308
South Korea	13,305
Taiwan	12,826
Scotland	11,956
Malaysia	11,826
Fiji	10,800
United States	10,530
Hong Kong SAR	9,799

At the 2021 census, the most commonly nominated ancestries were:

- English (32.5%)
- Australian (31.6%) (Note: The Australian Bureau of Statistics has stated that most who nominate "Australian" as their ancestry are part of the Anglo-Celtic group.)
- Irish (11.1%)
- Scottish (10.1%)
- German (5.7%)
- Chinese (4.7%)
- Aboriginal (2.8%) (Note: Those who nominated their ancestry as "Australian Aboriginal". Does not include Torres Strait Islanders. This relates to nomination of ancestry and is distinct from persons who identify as Indigenous (Aboriginal or Torres Strait Islander) which is a separate question.)
- Italian (2.7%)
- Indian (2.4%)
- Dutch (1.6%)
- Filipino (1.6%)
- Maori (1.5%)
- New Zealander (1.4%)
- Samoan (1.2%)
- Vietnamese (1.1%)

The 2021 census showed that 20.7% of Brisbane's inhabitants were born overseas and 25.2% of inhabitants had at least one parent born overseas. Brisbane has the 26th largest immigrant population among world metropolitan areas. Of inhabitants born outside of Australia, the five most prevalent countries of birth were New Zealand, England, India, mainland China and the Philippines. Brisbane has the largest community of New Zealanders outside of New Zealand, and is home to 1/3 of Australia's Maori population.

The areas of Sunnybank, Sunnybank Hills, Stretton, Robertson, Calamvale, Macgregor, Eight Mile Plains, Runcorn, and Rochedale, are home to a large proportion of Brisbane's Mainland China, Taiwan and Hong Kong-born population, with Chinese being the most commonly-reported ancestry in each of these areas. The Vietnamese-born are the largest immigrant group in Inala, Darra, Durack, Willawong, Richlands, and Doolandella. The Indian-born are the largest immigrant group in Chermside.

At the 2021 census, 3.0% of Brisbane's population identified as being Indigenous, which includes Aboriginal Australians and Torres Strait Islanders. (Note: Indigenous identification is separate to the ancestry question on the Australian Census and persons identifying as Aboriginal or Torres Strait Islander may identify any ancestry.)

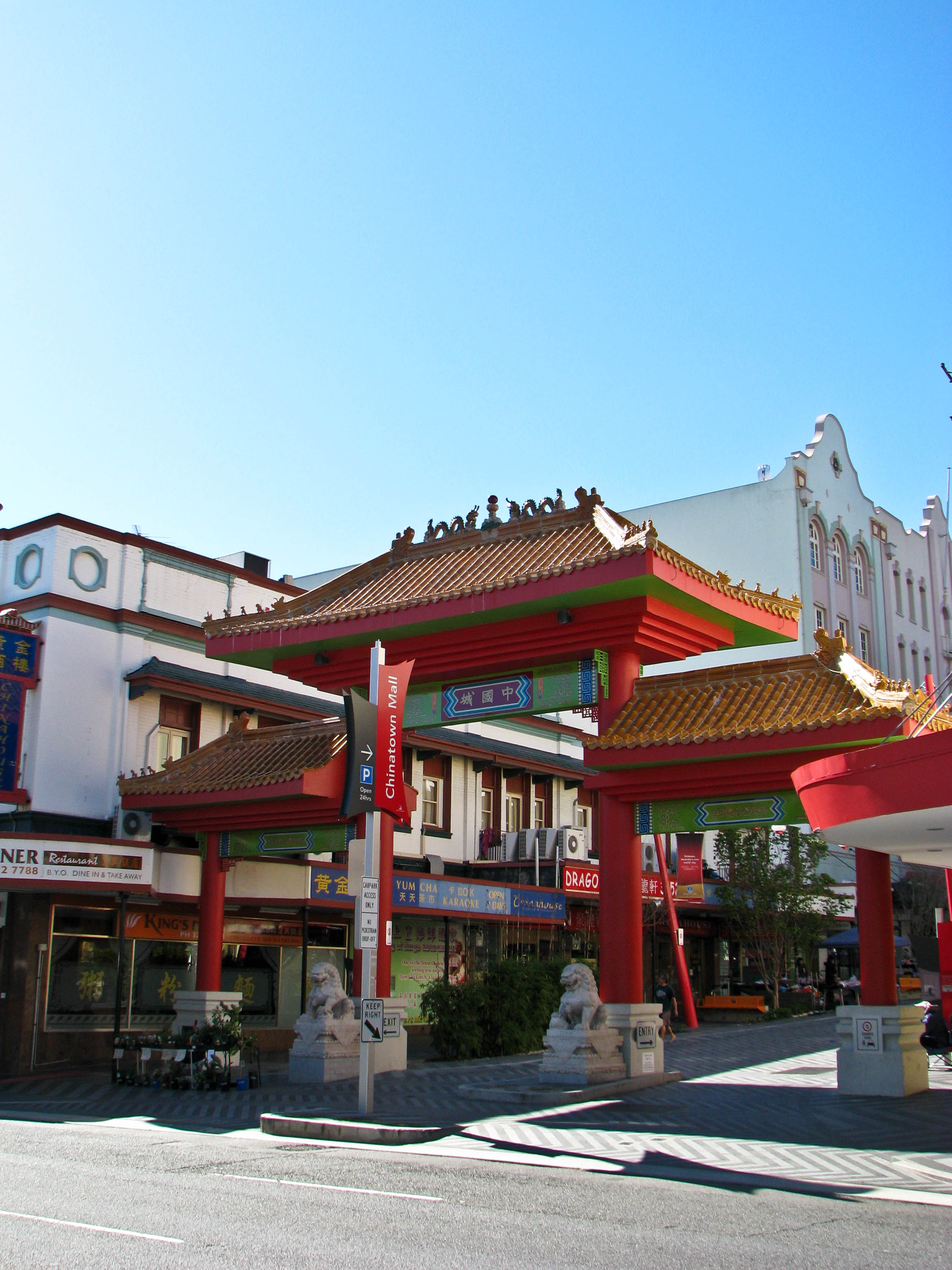
Brisbane's Chinatown. Chinese Australians are Brisbane's largest non-European ancestry.

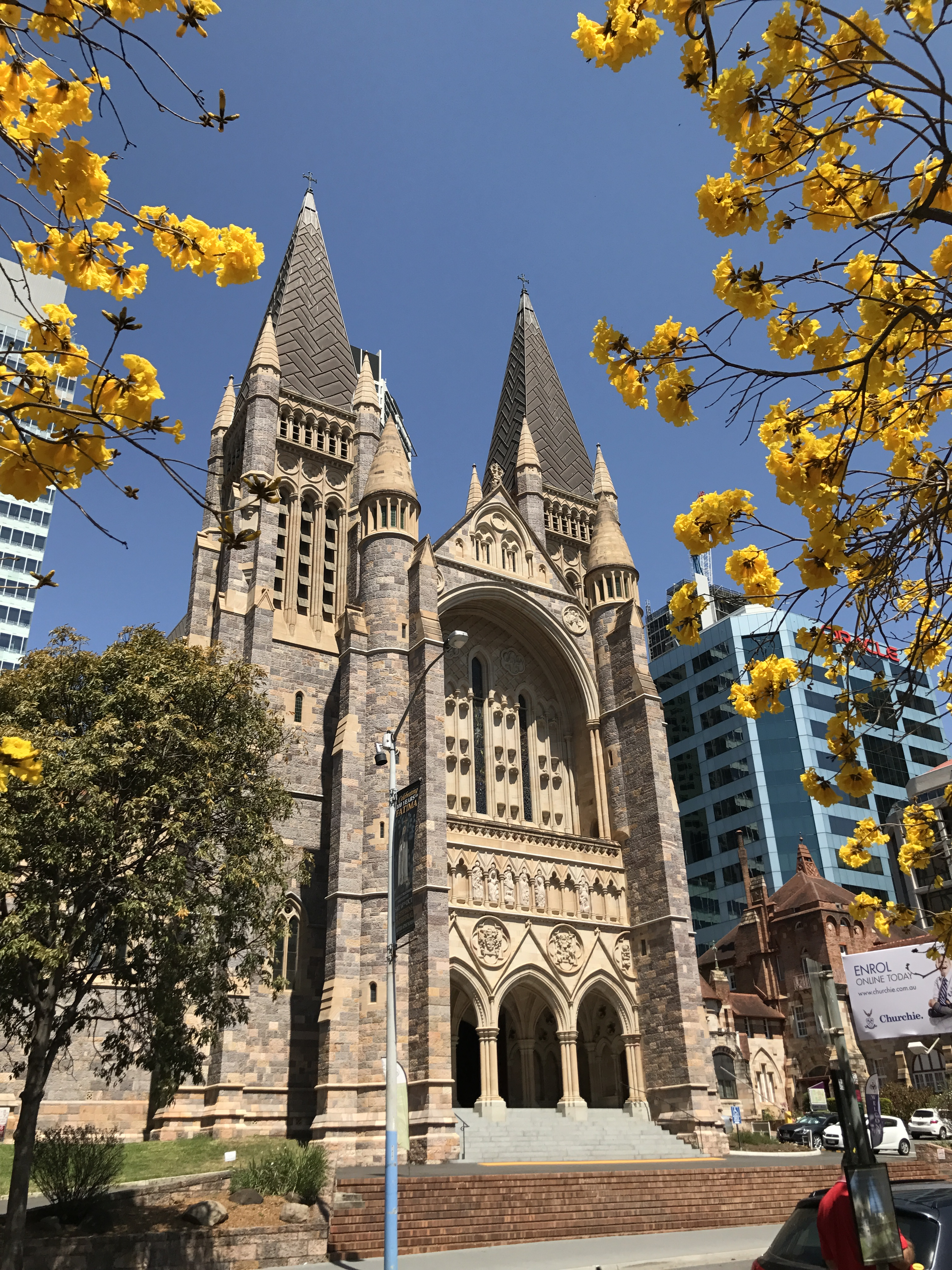
St John's Cathedral, an Anglican cathedral

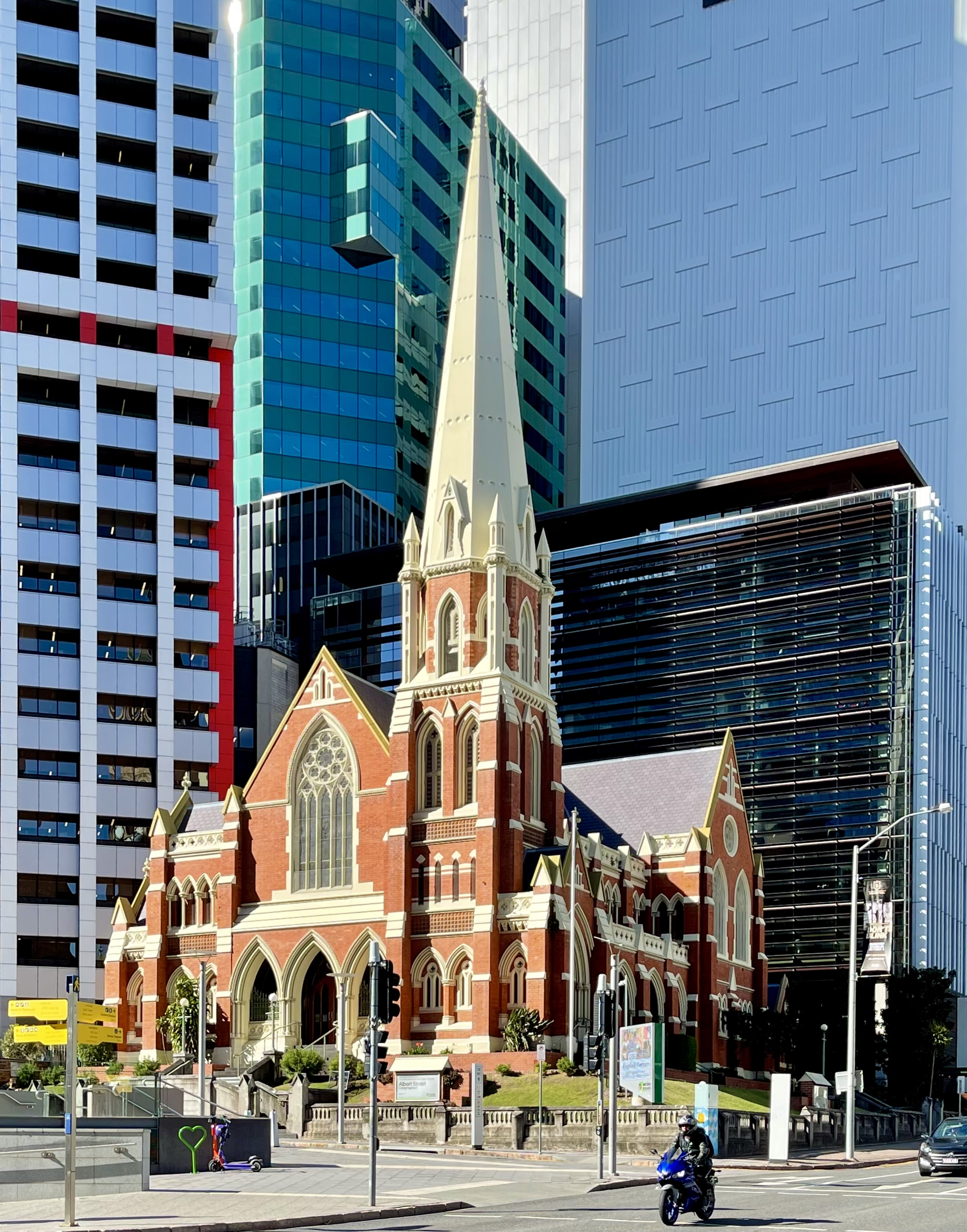
Albert Street Uniting Church

=== Language ===
At the 2021 census, 77.3% of inhabitants spoke only English at home, with the next most common languages being Mandarin (2.5%), Vietnamese (1.1%), Punjabi (0.9%), Cantonese (0.9%), and Spanish (0.8%).

=== Religion ===
At the 2021 census, the most commonly cited religious affiliation was "No religion" (41.4%). Brisbane's most popular religion at the 2021 census was Christianity at 44.3%, the most popular denominations of which were Catholicism (18.6%) and Anglicanism (9.7%). Brisbane's CBD is home to two cathedrals – St John's (Anglican) and St Stephen's (Catholic).

The most popular non-Christian religions at the 2021 census were Hindu (2%), Buddhist (1.9%), and Muslim (1.8%).

== Economy ==
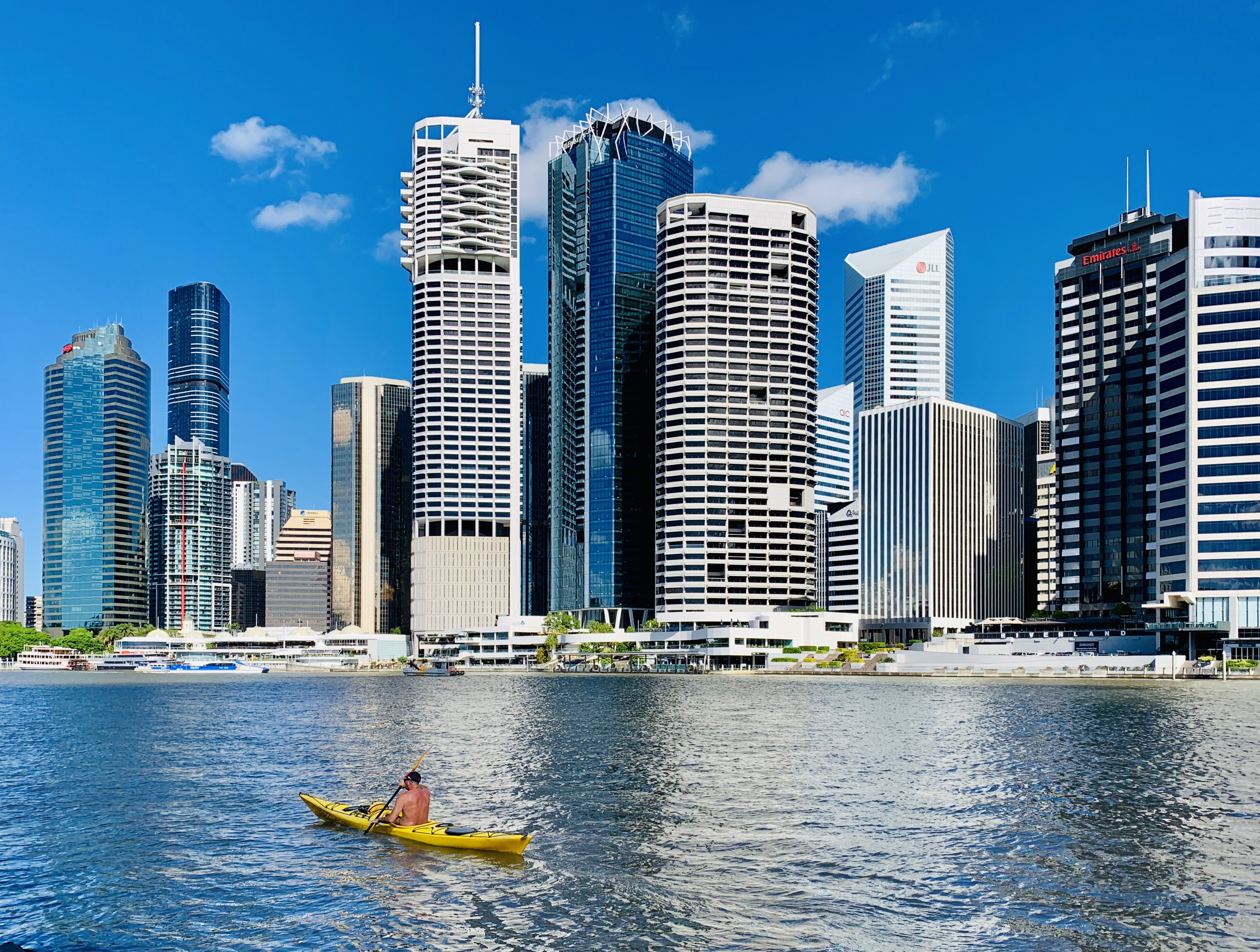
The Golden Triangle financial precinct surrounding Eagle Street Pier in the CBD

Categorised as a global city, Brisbane is among Asia-Pacific cities with largest GDPs and is one of the major business hubs in Australia, with strengths in mining, banking, insurance, transportation, information technology, real estate and food.

Some of the largest companies headquartered in Brisbane, all among Australia's largest, include Suncorp Group, Virgin Australia, Aurizon, Bank of Queensland, Flight Centre, Great Southern Bank, Australian Retirement Trust, Domino's Pizza Enterprises, Star Entertainment Group, ALS, TechnologyOne, NEXTDC, Super Retail Group, New Hope Coal, Jumbo Interactive, National Storage, Collins Foods, and Boeing Australia. Most major Australian companies, as well as numerous international companies, have contact offices in Brisbane.

Brisbane throughout its history has been one of Australia's most important seaport cities. The Port of Brisbane is located at the Brisbane River's mouth on Moreton Bay and on the adjacent Fisherman's Island, created by means of land reclamation. It is the 3rd busiest port in Australia for value of goods. Container freight, sugar, grain, coal and bulk liquids are the major exports. Most of the port facilities are less than three decades old and some are built on reclaimed mangroves and wetlands. The Port is a part of the Australia TradeCoast, which includes the Brisbane Airport along with large industrial estates located along both banks at the mouth of the Brisbane River.

White-collar industries include information technology, financial services, higher education and public sector administration generally concentrated in and around the central business district and satellite hubs located in the inner suburbs such as South Brisbane, Fortitude Valley, Spring Hill, Milton, and Toowong, Upper Mount Gravatt could be considered as a 2nd CBD to the city.

Blue-collar industries, including petroleum refining, stevedoring, paper milling, metalworking and QR railway workshops, tend to be located on the lower reaches of the Brisbane River proximal to the Port of Brisbane and in new industrial zones on the urban fringe.

Tourism is an important part of the Brisbane economy, both in its own right and as a gateway to other areas of Queensland, as is international education, with over 95,000 international students enrolled in universities and other tertiary education institutions in the central City of Brisbane local government area alone in 2018.

=== Retail ===
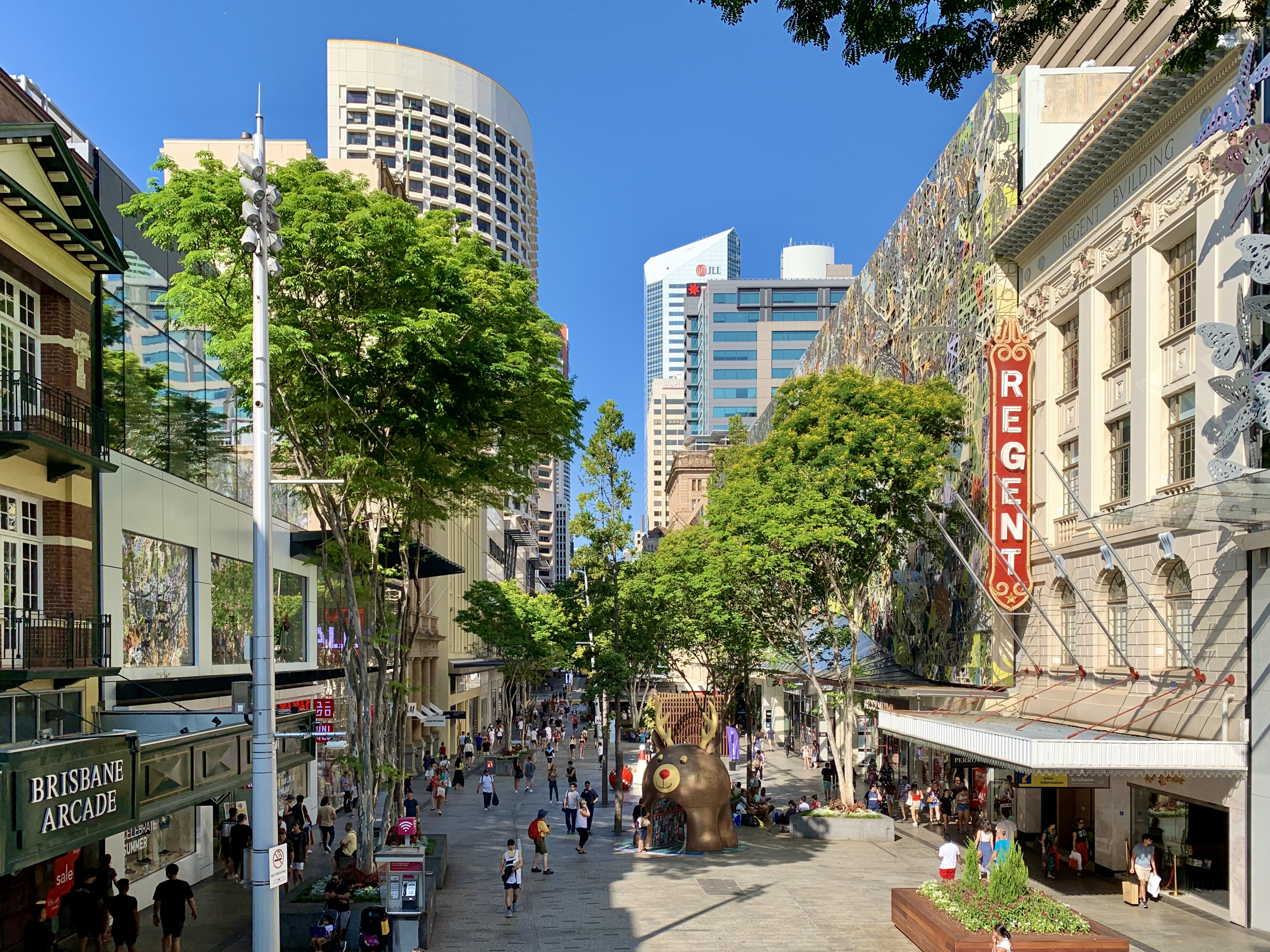
The Queen Street Mall, Queensland's largest pedestrian mall

Retail in the CBD is centred around the Queen Street Mall, which is Queensland's largest pedestrian mall. Shopping centres in the CBD include Uptown (formerly the Myer Centre), the Wintergarden, MacArthur Central and QueensPlaza, with the last of these along with Edward Street forming the city's focus for luxury brands. There are historical shopping arcades at Brisbane Arcade and Tattersalls Arcade. Suburbs adjacent to the CBD such as Fortitude Valley (particularly James Street), South Brisbane and West End are also a major inner-city retail hubs.

Outside of the inner-city, retail is focused on indoor shopping centres, including numerous regional shopping centres along with six super regional shopping centres, all of which are among Australia's largest, namely: Westfield Chermside in the north; Westfield Mt Gravatt in the south; Westfield Carindale in the east; Indooroopilly Shopping Centre in the west; Westfield North Lakes in the outer-north; and Logan Hyperdome in the outer-south. Brisbane's major factory outlet centres are the Direct Factory Outlets at Skygate and Jindalee.

The 100-hectare (250-acre) Brisbane Markets at Rocklea are Brisbane's largest wholesale markets, whilst smaller markets operate at numerous locations throughout the city including South Bank Parklands, Davies Park in West End, Queensland, and the Eat Street Markets at Hamilton.

== Culture and sport ==
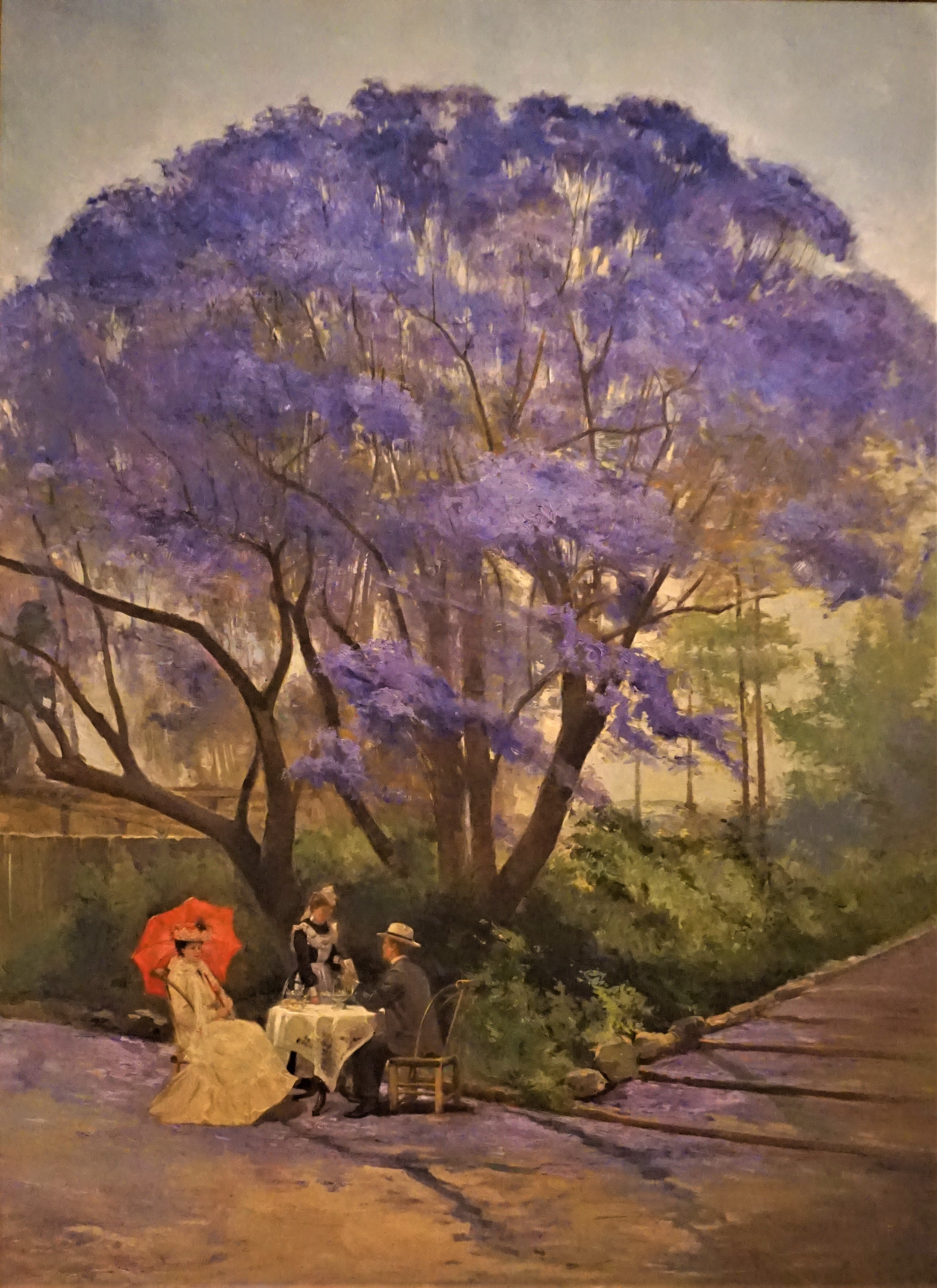
One of the most popular works in the Queensland Art Gallery's collection, Under The Jacaranda (1903) by Richard Godfrey Rivers shows the first jacaranda tree planted in Brisbane.

Brisbane is home to several art galleries, the largest of which are the Queensland Art Gallery and the Queensland Gallery of Modern Art (GOMA), which is the largest modern art gallery in Australia. GOMA holds the Asia Pacific Triennial (APT) which focuses on contemporary art from the Asia and Pacific in a variety of media from painting to video work. In addition, its size enables the gallery to exhibit particularly large shows.

GOMA houses the Australian Cinémathèque, a dedicated film facility offering a diverse program of screenings, including international cinema, influential filmmakers, rare prints, restorations and silent films with a live musical accompaniment. Screenings take place Wednesday and Friday nights, as well as matinees on weekends. Most screenings are free admission.

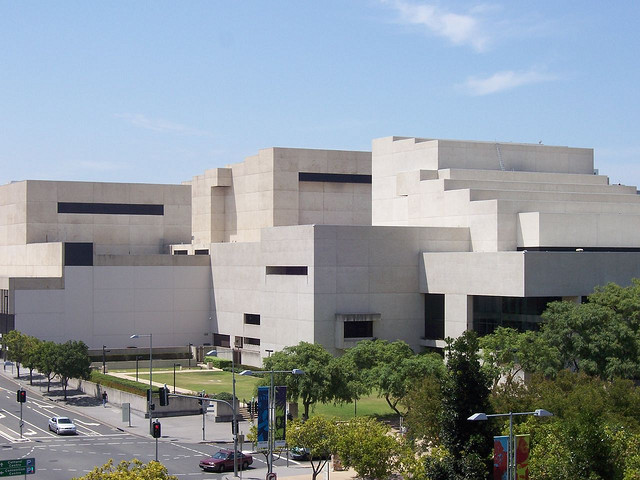
Queensland Performing Arts Centre

Dramatic and musical theatre performances are held at the multiple large theatres located at Queensland Performing Arts Centre (QPAC). The Brisbane Powerhouse in New Farm and the Judith Wright Arts Centre in Fortitude Valley also feature diverse programs featuring exhibitions and festivals of visual art, music and dance. Brisbane is also home to numerous small theatres including the Brisbane Arts Theatre in Petrie Terrace, the La Boite Theatre Company which performs at the Roundhouse Theatre at Kelvin Grove, the Twelfth Night Theatre at Bowen Hills, the Metro Arts Theatre in Edward Street, and the Queensland Theatre Company's Bille Brown Theatre in West End.

The Queensland Performing Arts Centre (QPAC) at South Bank, consists of the Lyric Theatre, the Concert Hall, the Cremorne Theatre and the Playhouse Theatre and is home to the Queensland Ballet, Opera Queensland, the Queensland Theatre Company, and the Queensland Symphony Orchestra. The Queensland Conservatorium, a musical conservatorium in which professional music companies and conservatorium students also stage performances, is located within the South Bank Parklands. Numerous choirs present performances across the city annually. These choirs include the Brisbane Chorale, Queensland Choir, Brisbane Chamber Choir, Canticum Chamber Choir, ChoirWorks, Imogen Children's Chorale, and Brisbane Birralee Voices.

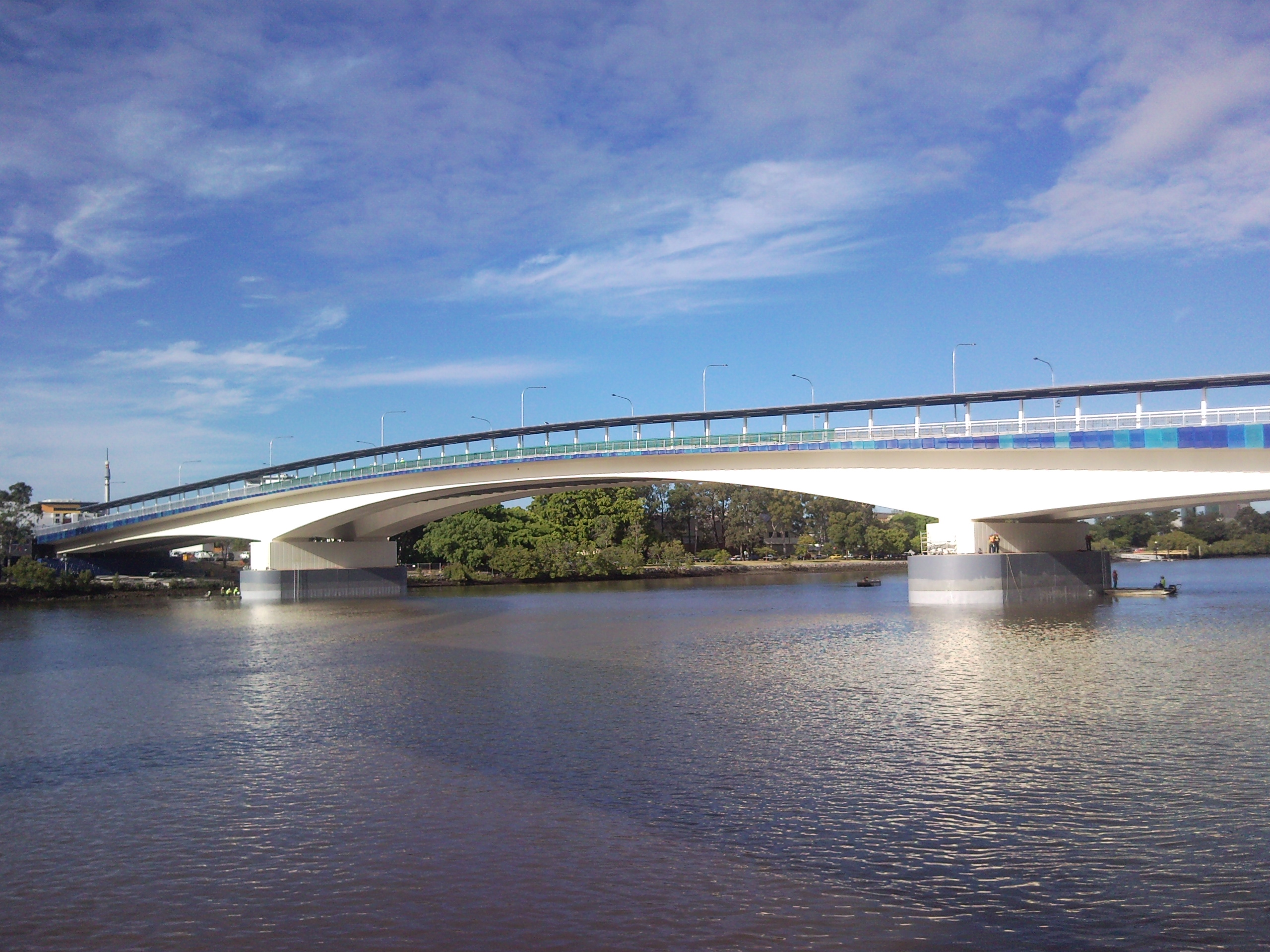
Go Between Bridge, named after local jangle pop band the Go-Betweens

Brisbane's live music scene is diverse and its history is often intertwined with social unrest and authoritarian politics, as retold by journalist Andrew Stafford in Pig City: From The Saints to Savage Garden. Popular live music venues, including pubs and clubs, can be found within both the CBD and Fortitude Valley. The Brisbane Entertainment Centre at Boondall hosts many musical concerts, with some of the largest being held at Lang Park. Musicians from Brisbane include the Bee Gees (raised in Redcliffe and Cribb Island), the Saints (based in Brisbane since 1974, one of the first punk rock bands), the Go-Betweens (after whom Brisbane's Go Between Bridge is named, and whose songs and albums, such as Spring Hill Fair, reflect the attitudes of 1980s Brisbane), Savage Garden, Powderfinger (who met at Brisbane Grammar School and the University of Queensland), and the Veronicas (born and raised in Albany Creek). The city is featured in music including the Saints' "Brisbane (Security City)" (1978); the Stranglers' "Nuclear Device" (1979) about Joh Bjelke-Petersen; Midnight Oil's single "Dreamworld" (1987); and Powderfinger's album Vulture Street (2003).

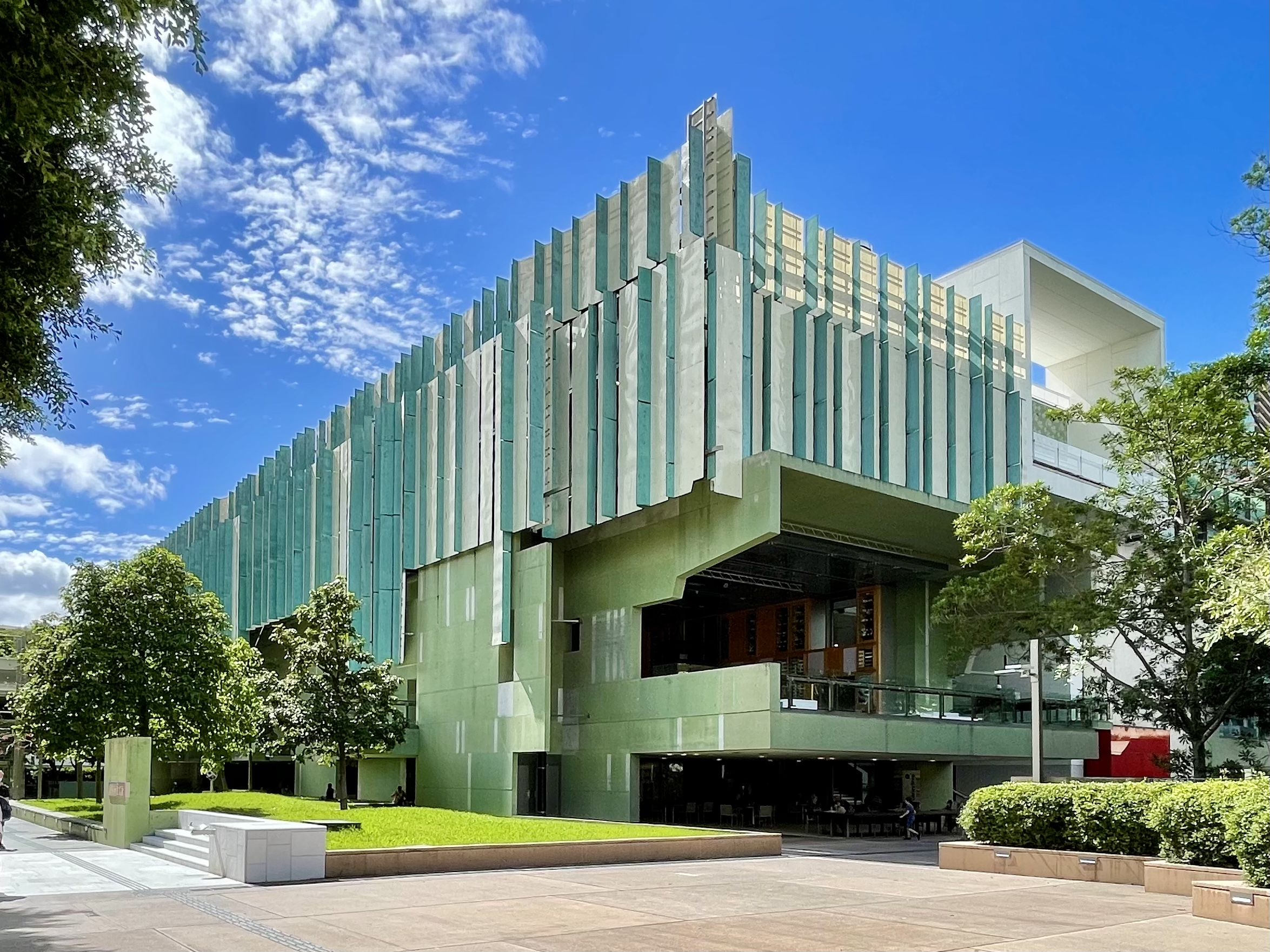
State Library of Queensland

Prominent writers from Brisbane include David Malouf (whose 1975 novel Johnno is set in Brisbane and at Brisbane Grammar School during World War II), Nick Earls (whose 1996 novel Zigzag Street is set at Zigzag Street in Red Hill), and Li Cunxin, author of Mao's Last Dancer and artistic director of the Queensland Ballet. Brisbane is a 2018 novel by Russian writer Eugene Vodolazkin. In the novel, the city serves as a metaphor of the promised land for the protagonist. The State Library of Queensland, the state's largest library, is located at the Queensland Cultural Centre.

Since the late 20th century, numerous films have been shot in Brisbane, and the popular children's animated television series Bluey is produced and set in Brisbane.

Brisbane is home to over 6,000 restaurants and dining establishments, with outdoor dining featuring prominently. The most popular cuisines by number of dining establishments are Japanese, Chinese, Modern Australian, Italian, American, Indian, and Vietnamese. Moreton Bay bugs, less commonly known as flathead lobsters, are an ingredient named for the Brisbane region and which feature commonly in the city's cuisine, along with macadamia nuts, also native to the region.

=== Annual events ===
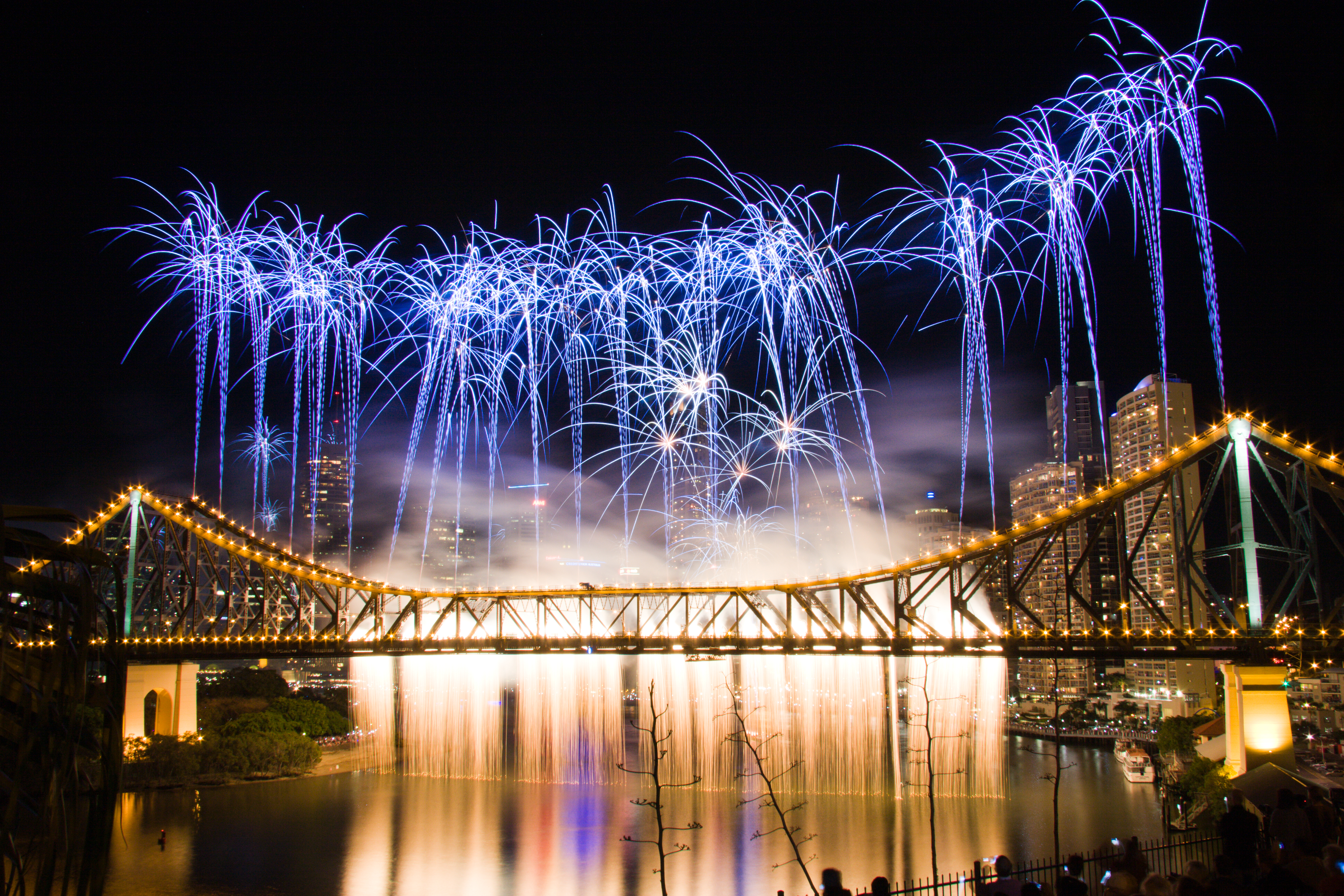
Riverfire at the Story Bridge

The Royal Queensland Exhibition (known locally as the Ekka), an agricultural exhibition held each August at the Brisbane Showgrounds in Bowen Hills, is the longest-running major annual event held in Brisbane. A public holiday is held for each local government area across Brisbane to enable widespread public attendance.

The Brisbane Festival is held each September at South Bank Parklands, the CBD and surrounding areas. It includes Riverfire, one of the Queensland's largest annual fireworks displays, which is attended by hundreds of thousands of residents.

The Brisbane International Film Festival (BIFF) is held in July/August each year in a variety of venues around Brisbane. BIFF features new films and retrospectives by domestic and international filmmakers along with seminars and awards.

The Brisbane Portrait Prize is an annual arts event held formerly at the Brisbane Powerhouse and from 2024, at the State Library of Queensland. Sitters for the portrait must have a connection to Brisbane city.

The Buddha Birth Day festival at South Bank parklands attracts over 200,000 visitors each year, and is the largest event of its type in Australia.

There are also many smaller community events such as the Paniyiri Greek Festival (held over two days in May), the Brisbane Medieval Fayre and Tournament (held each June), the Bridge to Brisbane charity fun run, the Anywhere Festival and the Caxton Street Seafood and Wine Festival.

Major events are often held at the 171 km^{2} (66 sq mi) Brisbane Convention & Exhibition Centre in South Brisbane.

=== Sport ===
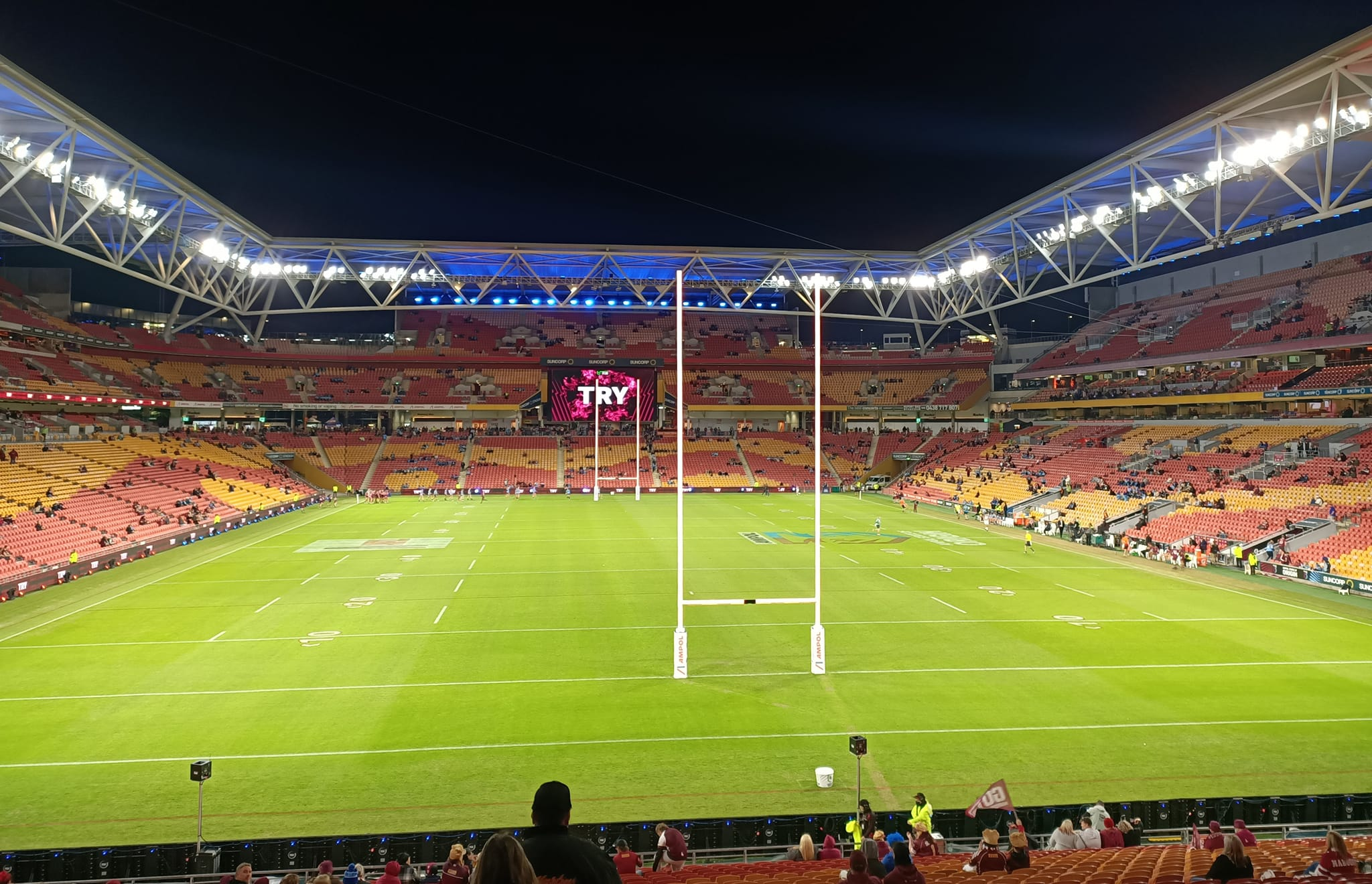
Lang Park

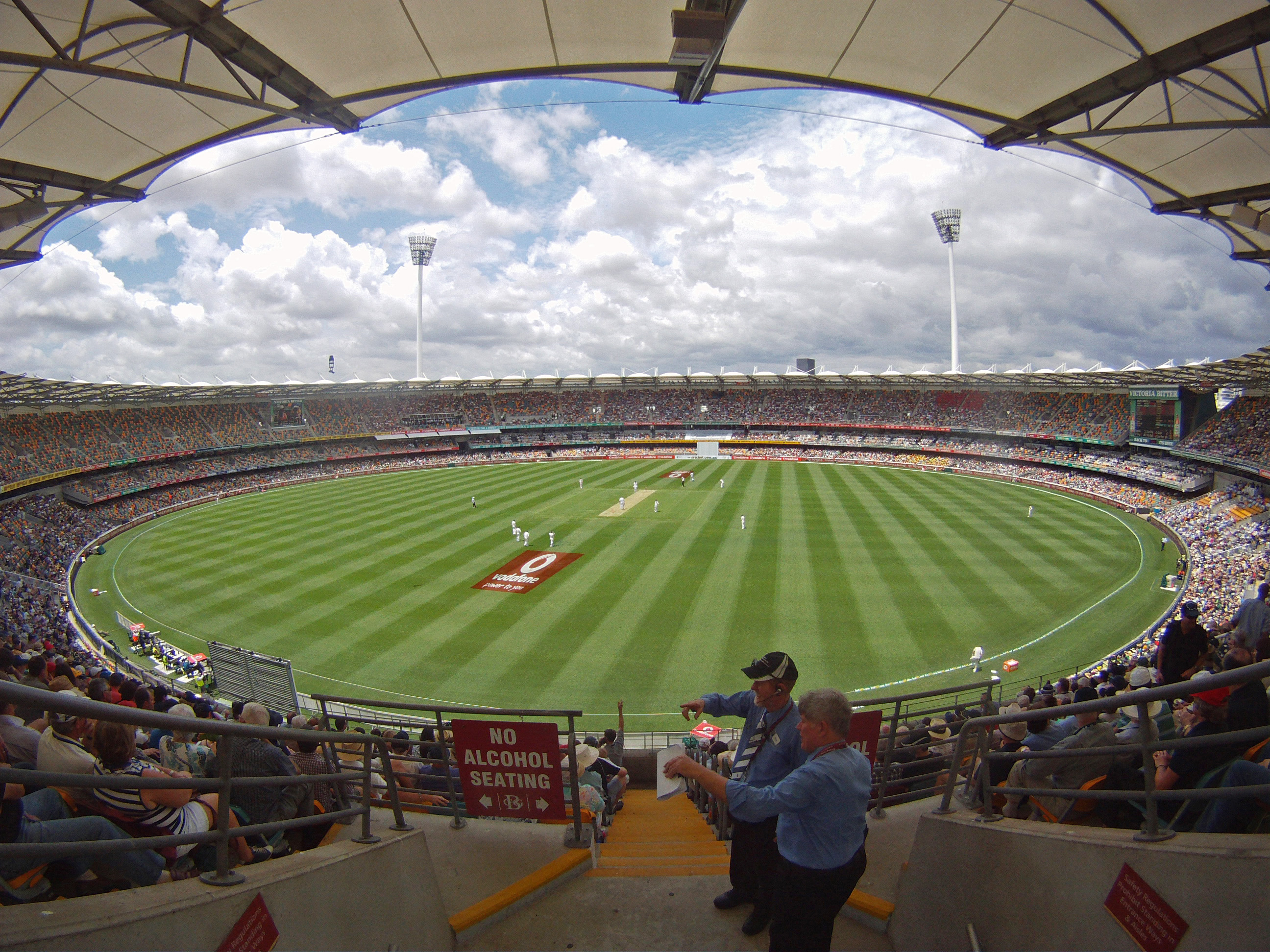
Cricket game at The Gabba

Brisbane has hosted several major sporting events including the 1982 Commonwealth Games and the 2001 Goodwill Games, as well as events during the 1987 Rugby World Cup, 1992 Cricket World Cup, 2000 Sydney Olympics, 2003 Rugby World Cup, 2008 Rugby League World Cup, 2015 Asian Cup, 2017 Rugby League World Cup, 2018 Commonwealth Games and the 2023 Women's World Cup.

It will host the 2032 Summer Olympics and 2032 Summer Paralympics in Victoria Park. The city also bid for the 1992 Summer Olympics but lost to Barcelona. It holds the Brisbane International tennis competition every year.

Brisbane is represented by the rugby league teams the Brisbane Broncos and Dolphins, who play in the National Rugby League, and is also home to the Queensland Maroons, who play in the State of Origin series. In rugby union the city hosts the Queensland Reds who play in the Super Rugby competition. Brisbane also hosts a professional Australian rules football team, the Brisbane Lions, who play in the Australian Football League; as well as an A-League soccer team, the Brisbane Roar FC.

In Cricket the city hosts the Brisbane Heat who play in the Big Bash League and the Queensland Bulls who play in the Sheffield Shield and the Ryobi One Day Cup. Other Brisbane sports teams include a basketball team, the Brisbane Bullets; a baseball team, the Brisbane Bandits; a netball team, the Queensland Firebirds; a field hockey team, the Brisbane Blaze; and water polo teams the Brisbane Barracudas and Queensland Breakers.

The city's major stadiums and sporting venues include the Gabba (a 37,000 seat round stadium at Woolloongabba), Lang Park (a 52,500 seat rectangular stadium at Milton also known by its corporate name Suncorp Stadium), Ballymore Stadium, the Queensland Sport and Athletics Centre, the Sleeman Centre (swimming), the State Tennis Centre, the Eagle Farm Racecourse, and the Doomben Racecourse. The city is also home to numerous golf courses, with the largest being the Indooroopilly Golf Club at Indooroopilly, Queensland, the Brookwater Golf and Country Club at Brookwater, Nudgee Golf Club at Nudgee, the Keperra Country Golf Club at Keperra, and the Royal Queensland Golf Club at Eagle Farm.

In addition to its flagship sport franchises, Brisbane and its regions and suburbs have numerous teams in secondary leagues including the Intrust Super Cup, National Rugby Championship, Queensland Premier Rugby, National Premier League Queensland, National Basketball League, ANZ Championship, Australian Baseball League, Hockey One, National Water Polo League, and F-League.

== Tourism and recreation ==
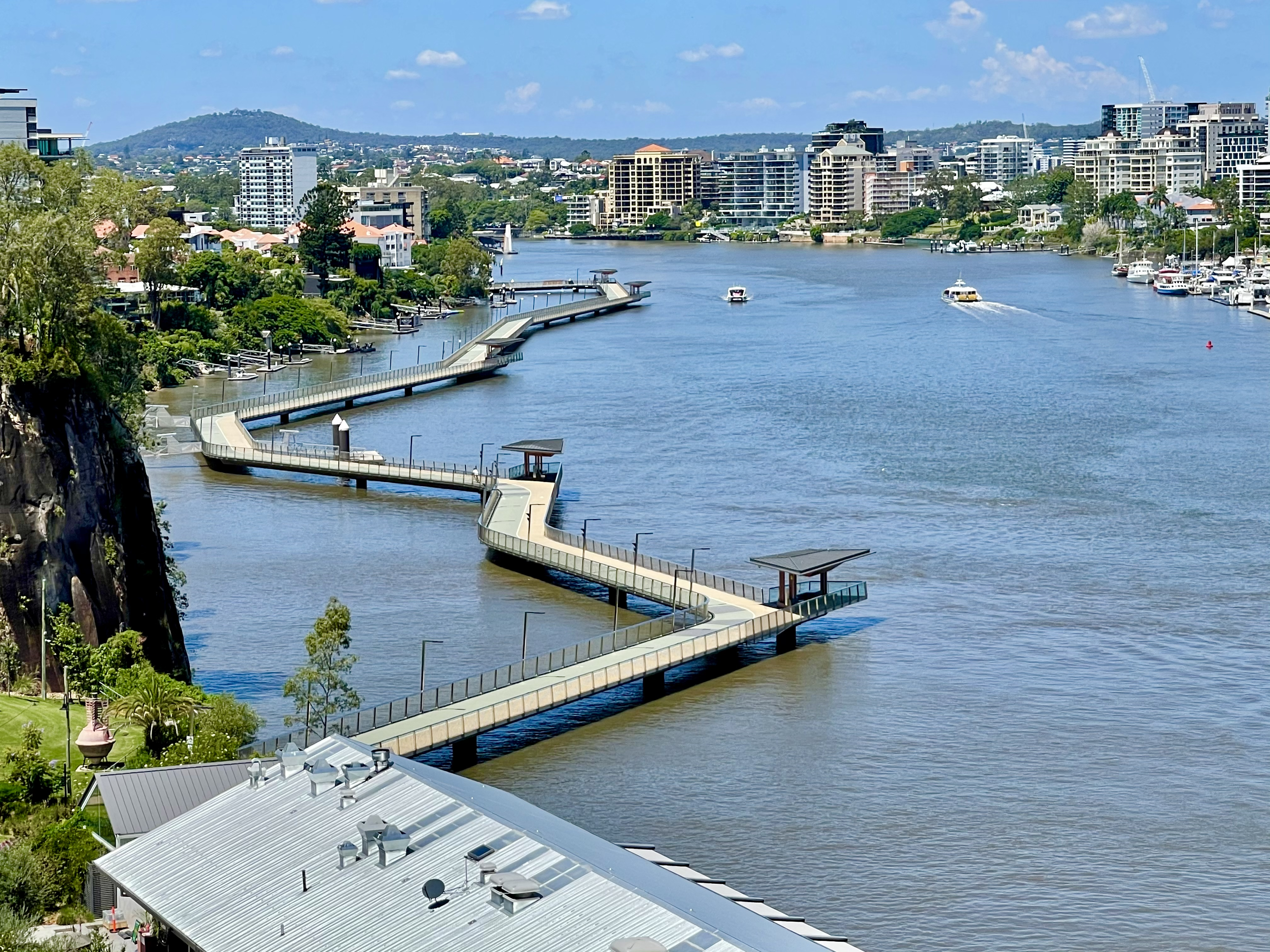
The Brisbane Riverwalk at New Farm

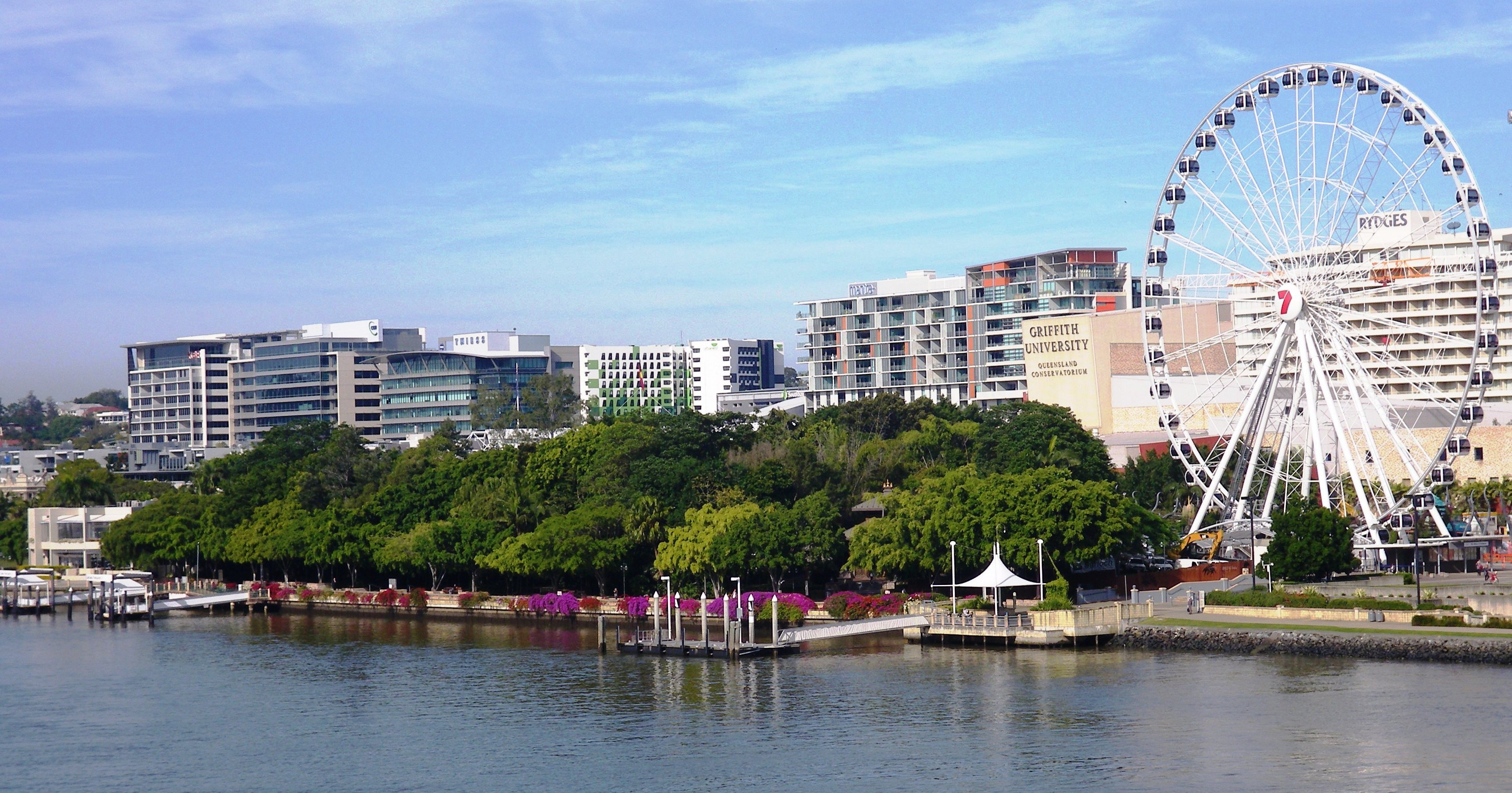
South Bank Parklands and the Wheel of Brisbane

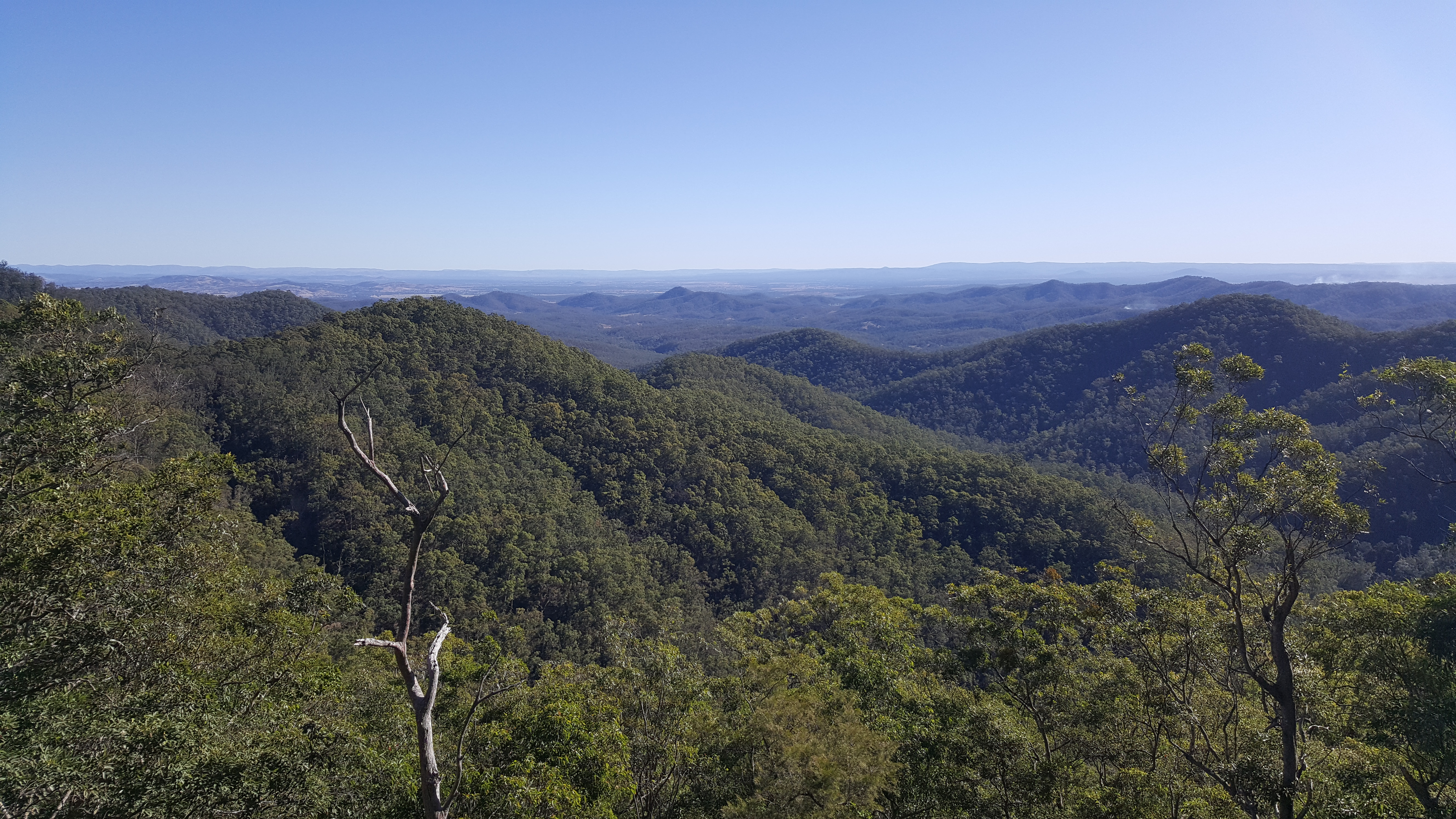
D'Aguilar Range from Westridge Outlook in D'Aguilar National Park

Tourism plays a major role in Brisbane's economy, being the third-most popular destination for international tourists after Sydney and Melbourne. Popular tourist and recreation areas near inner city Brisbane include the South Bank Parklands (including the Wheel of Brisbane), the City Botanic Gardens, Roma Street Parkland, New Farm Park, the Howard Smith Wharves, Queens Wharf & Casino, the Teneriffe woolstores precinct, Fortitude Valley (including James Street and Chinatown), West End, City Hall (including the Museum of Brisbane), the Parliament of Queensland, the Story Bridge and bridge climb; St John's Cathedral, ANZAC Square and the Queensland Cultural Centre (including the Queensland Museum, Queensland Performing Arts Centre, Queensland Art Gallery, the Gallery of Modern Art and the State Library of Queensland), the Kangaroo Point Cliffs and park, and the Queensland Maritime Museum.

Away from the inner city, Brisbane has a number of tourist attractions and destinations such as the University of Queensland in St Lucia, Sirromet Winery at Mount Cotton, Tangalooma on Moreton Island, Lone Pine Koala Sanctuary in Fig Tree Pocket, Eat Street (food night markets) at Northshore Hamilton, Fort Lytton, and Mount Coot-tha (including the Mount Coot-tha Reserve, Mount Coot-tha Lookout, the Mount Coot-tha Botanic Gardens and the Sir Thomas Brisbane Planetarium) is a popular recreational attraction for hiking and bushwalking.

Brisbane is notable for its Brisbane Riverwalk network, which runs along much of the Brisbane River foreshore throughout the inner-city area, with the longest span running between Newstead and Toowong. Another popular stretch runs beneath the Kangaroo Point Cliffs between South Brisbane and Kangaroo Point. Several spans of the Riverwalk are built out over the Brisbane River. Brisbane also has over 27 km (17 mi) of bicycle pathways, mostly surrounding the Brisbane River and city centre. Other popular recreation activities include the Story Bridge adventure climb and rock climbing at the Kangaroo Point Cliffs.

Moreton Bay and its marine park is also a major attraction, and its three primary islands Moreton Island, North Stradbroke Island and Bribie Island, accessible by ferry, contain popular surf beaches and resorts. Tangalooma resort on Moreton Island is popular for its nightly wild dolphin feeding attraction, and for operating Australia's longest running whale watching cruises. The Fort Lytton National Park including a colonial defence fort and museum is also a historical bayside attraction. Beachside suburbs such as those on the Redcliffe Peninsula, as well as Shorncliffe, Sandgate, Wynnum, Manly and Wellington Point are also popular attractions for their bayside beaches, piers, and infrastructure for boating, sailing, fishing and kitesurfing.

There are many national parks surrounding the Brisbane metropolitan area which are popular recreational attractions for hiking and bushwalking. The D'Aguilar National Park runs along the northwest of the metropolitan area in the D'Aguilar Range, and contains popular bushwalking and hiking peaks at Mount Nebo, Camp Mountain, Mount Pleasant, Mount Glorious, Mount Samson and Mount Mee. The Glass House Mountains National Park is located to the north of the metropolitan area in the Glass House Mountains between it and that of the Sunshine Coast. The Tamborine National Park at Tamborine Mountain is located in the Gold Coast hinterland to the south of the metropolitan area. Moreton, North Stradbroke and Bribie islands are substantially covered by the Moreton Island National Park, Naree Budjong Djara National Park and the Bribie Island National Park respectively. The Boondall Wetlands in the suburb of Boondall are protected mangrove wetlands with floating walking trails.

Immediately to the south and north of Brisbane are the Gold Coast and Sunshine Coast respectively, which are home to several of Australia's most popular swimming and surfing beaches, and are popular day and weekend destinations for Brisbanites.

In 2015, a competition by travel guidebook Rough Guides saw Brisbane elected as one of the top ten most beautiful cities in the world, citing reasons such as "its winning combination of high-rise modern architecture, lush green spaces and the enormous Brisbane River that snakes its way through the centre before emptying itself into the azure Moreton Bay".

== Governance ==
City of Brisbane coat of arms

City of Brisbane flag

Unlike other Australian capital cities, a large portion of the greater metropolitan area, or Greater Capital City Statistical Area (GCCSA) of Brisbane is controlled by a single local government area, the City of Brisbane, which is the largest local government area (in terms of population and budget) in Australia, serving more than 40% of the GCCSA's population. It was formed by the merger of twenty smaller LGAs in 1925, and covers an area of 1,367 km^{2} (528 sq mi). The remainder of the metropolitan area falls into the LGAs of Logan City to the south, City of Moreton Bay in the northern suburbs, the City of Ipswich to the south west, Redland City to the south east, and into the Somerset, Scenic Rim and Lockyer Valley regions on the urban periphery. Several of these are also among the nation's most populous LGAs.

Each LGA is governed under a similar structure, including a directly elected mayor (including the Lord Mayor of Brisbane), as well as a council composed of councillors representing geographical wards. Brisbane City Hall is the seat of the Brisbane City Council, the governing corporation of the City of Brisbane LGA, and the bulk of its executive offices are located at the Brisbane Square skyscraper.

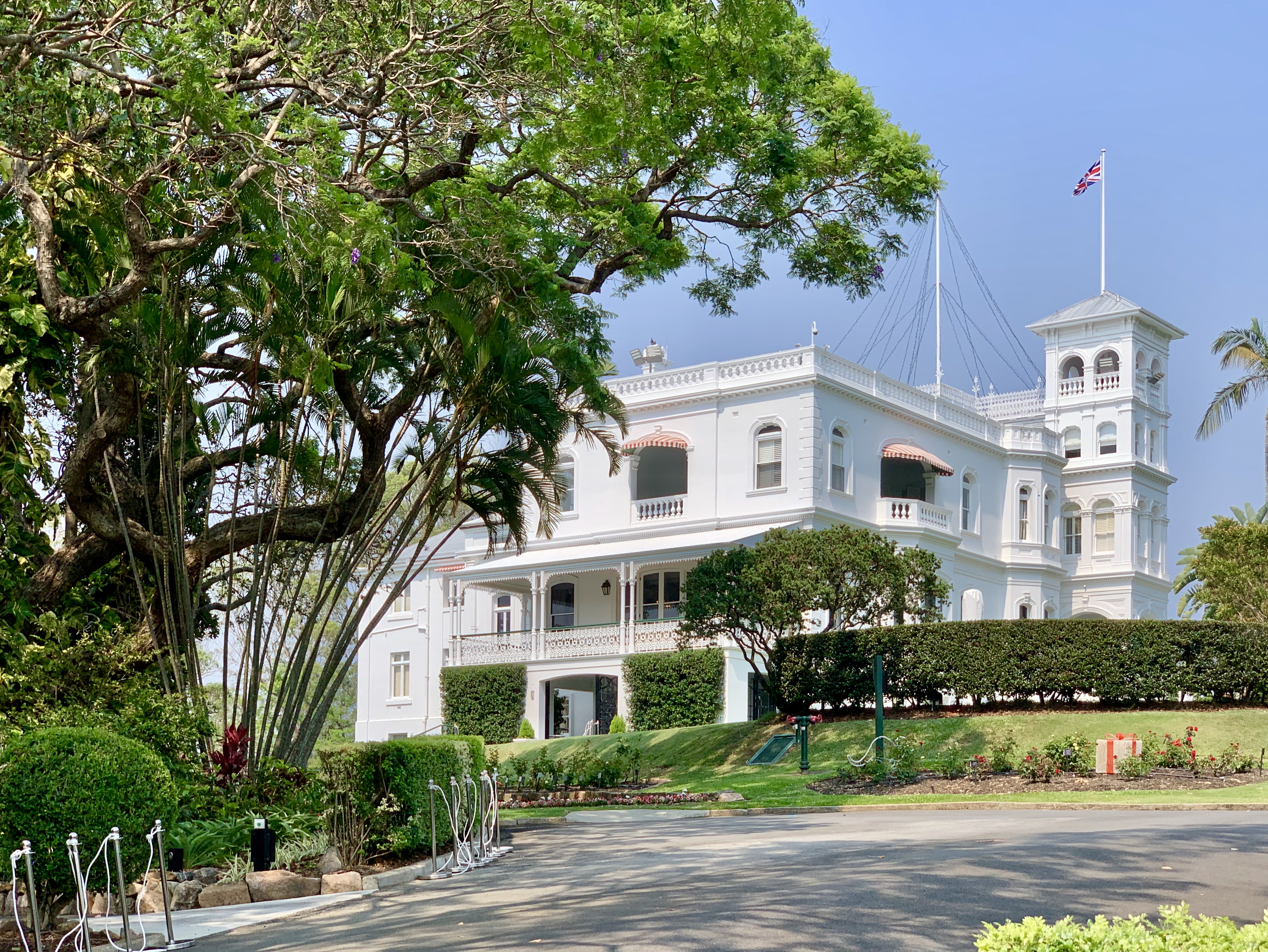
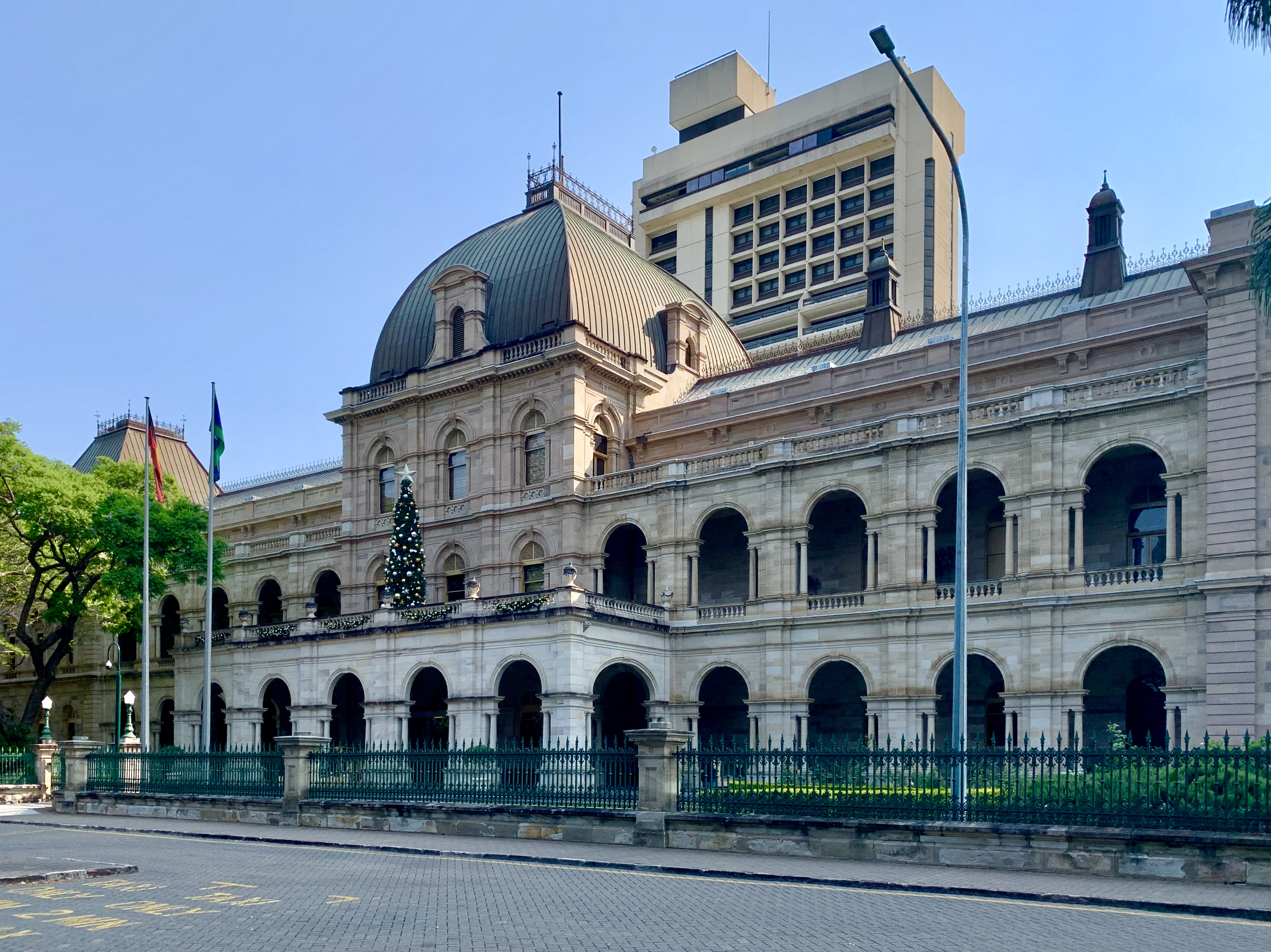
Government House, Brisbane, home to the Governor of Queensland and Parliament House, home of the Parliament of Queensland

As the capital city of Queensland, Brisbane is home to the Parliament of Queensland at Parliament House at Gardens Point in the CBD, adjacent to Old Government House. Queensland's current Government House is located in Paddington. The bulk of the state government's executive offices are located at the 1 William Street skyscraper. The Queensland Supreme and District courts are located at the Queen Elizabeth II Courts of Law in George Street, while the Magistrates court is located at the adjacent Brisbane Magistrates Court building. The various federal courts are located at the Commonwealth Law Courts building on North Quay.

The Australian Army's Enoggera Barracks is located in Enoggera, while the historic Victoria Barracks in Petrie Terrace now hosts a military museum. The Royal Australian Navy's HMAS Moreton base is located at Bulimba. The Royal Australian Air Force's RAAF Base Amberley is located in Amberley in the outer south-west of the metropolitan area.

Brisbane's largest prisons and correctional facilities, the Brisbane Correctional Centre, Brisbane Women's Correctional Centre, Arthur Gorrie Correctional Centre and Wolston Correctional Centre are located at Wacol, while the city's main historical prison, the Boggo Road Gaol, is now a museum.

=== Politics ===
Greater Brisbane is represented by five local government areas (LGAs): the City of Brisbane, the City of Ipswich, Logan City, the City of Moreton Bay and Redland City. The City of Brisbane is by far the largest and the most populated of the five, and Brisbane City Council has 27 members: 26 councillors elected from single-member wards and one directly elected Lord Mayor.

In the Queensland Legislative Assembly, Brisbane is represented by 41 single-member electoral districts. In the House of Representatives, Brisbane is represented by 13 single-member electoral divisions.

Brisbane has a diverse political climate. On the federal level, the centre-left Labor Party holds 11 Brisbane-based seats, while the centre-right Liberal National Party (LNP) and the left-wing Greens each hold one (Bowman and Ryan, respectively). On the state level, Labor holds the vast majority of Brisbane-based seats, while the LNP holds nine and the Greens hold one (Maiwar). On the local level, LNP hold the Lord Mayoralty of Brisbane (with Adrian Schrinner as Lord Mayor) and 18 of the 26 wards of the City of Brisbane, while Labor holds five, the Greens hold two and an independent hold one (Tennyson Ward).

== Education ==
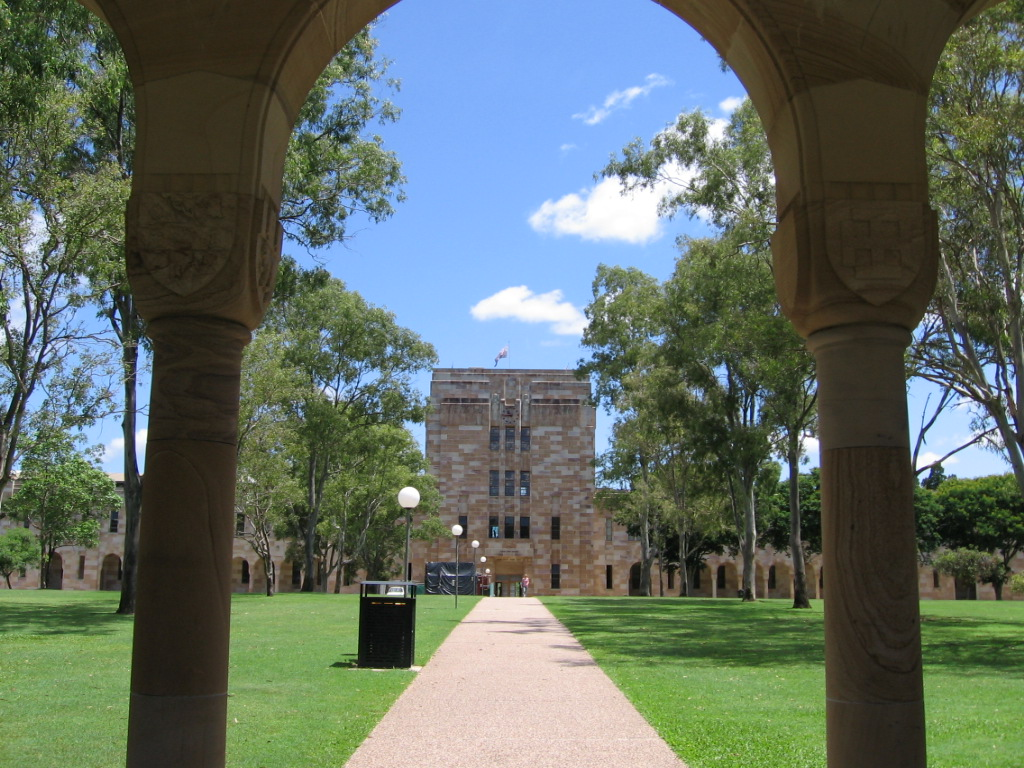
Forgan Smith Building from the Great Court at the University of Queensland's St Lucia campus

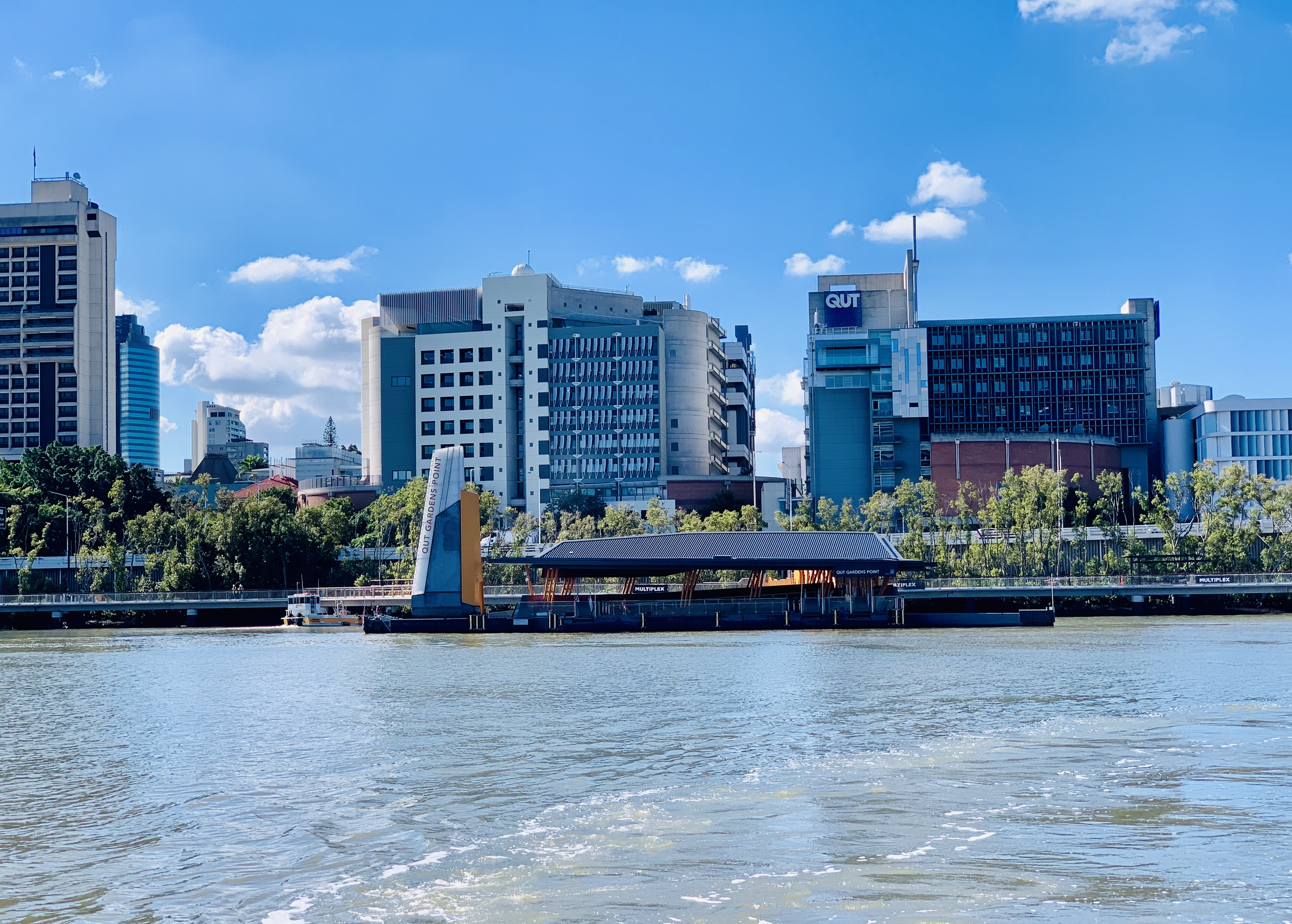
Queensland University of Technology's Gardens Point campus

Three major universities are headquartered in Brisbane, namely:

- The University of Queensland (UQ), which is Queensland's oldest university and frequently ranks among the world's top 50, with campuses in St Lucia, Herston, Gatton, and Woolloongabba, the latter named as the UQ Dutton Park Campus due to its proximity to Dutton Park station.
- Queensland University of Technology (QUT), with campuses in the central business district (Gardens Point) and Kelvin Grove
- Griffith University (GU), with campuses in Nathan, Mount Gravatt, South Bank and Meadowbrook

Two other major universities, which are not headquartered in Brisbane, have multiple campuses in the Brisbane metropolitan area, namely:

- The University of Southern Queensland (USQ), with campuses in Springfield and Ipswich and the central business district
- The University of the Sunshine Coast (USC), with campuses in Petrie and Caboolture

Other universities which have campuses in Brisbane include the Australian Catholic University, Central Queensland University and James Cook University.

Brisbane is a major destination for international students, who constitute a large proportion of enrolments in Brisbane's universities and are important to the city's economy and real estate market. In 2018, there were over 95,000 international students enrolled in universities and other tertiary education institutions in the central City of Brisbane local government area alone. The majority of Brisbane's international students originate from China, India and other countries in the Asia-Pacific region.

There are biotechnology and research facilities at several universities in Brisbane, including the Institute for Molecular Bioscience and CSIRO at the University of Queensland and the Institute of Health and Biomedical Innovation at Queensland University of Technology.

There are three major TAFE colleges in Brisbane; the Brisbane North Institute of TAFE, the Metropolitan South Institute of TAFE, and the Southbank Institute of TAFE. Brisbane is also home to numerous other independent tertiary providers, including the Australian College of Natural Medicine, the Queensland Theological College, the Brisbane College of Theology, SAE Institute, Jschool: Journalism Education & Training, JMC Academy, and American College, and the Aboriginal Centre for the Performing Arts.

Many of Brisbane's pre-school, primary, and secondary schools are under the jurisdiction of Education Queensland, a department of the Queensland Government. Independent (private), Roman Catholic and other religious schools also constitute a large share of Brisbane's primary and secondary schooling sectors, with the oldest such independent schools composing the memberships of the Great Public Schools Association of Queensland (GPS) for boys schools and Queensland Girls' Secondary Schools Sports Association (QGSSSA) for girls schools.

== Infrastructure ==
=== Transport ===
Brisbane has an extensive transport network within the city, as well as connections to regional centres, interstate and to overseas destinations. Like all Australian cities, the most popular mode of transport is private car. Public transport is provided by rail, bus and ferry services and is coordinated by Translink, which provides a unified ticketing and electronic payment system (known as go card) for South East Queensland. The region is divided into seven fare zones radiating outwards from the Brisbane central business district (CBD), with Brisbane's built-up area falling within zones 1–3. Bus services are operated by public and private operators whereas trains and ferries are operated by public agencies. The CBD is the central hub for all public transport services with services focusing on Roma Street, Central and Fortitude Valley railway stations; King George Square, Queen Street and Roma Street busway stations; and North Quay, Riverside and QUT Gardens Point ferry wharves.

==== Roads ====
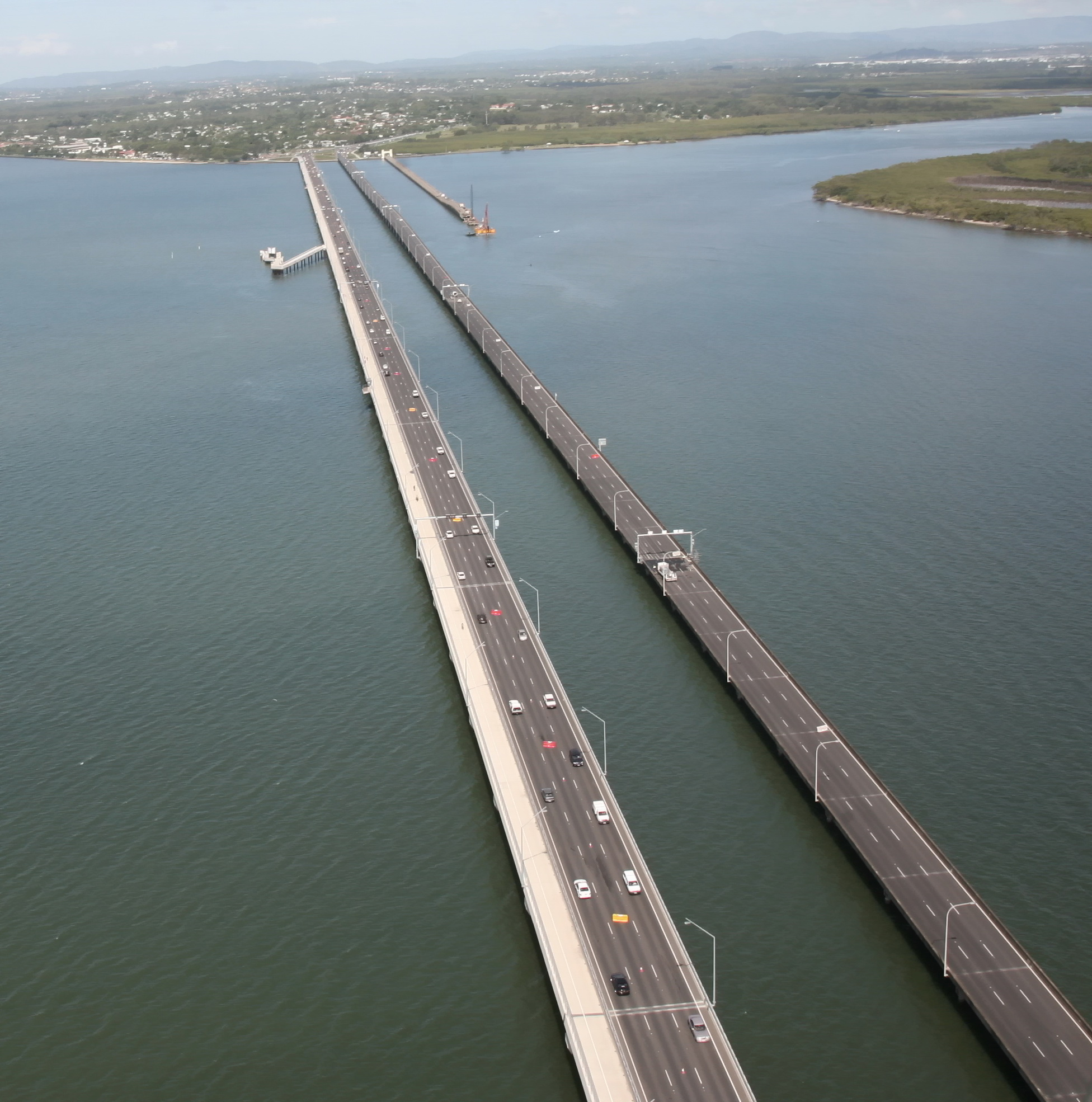
Houghton Highway and Ted Smout Memorial Bridge crossing Bramble Bay, Queensland's longest bridges

Brisbane is served by a large network of urban and inter-urban motorways. The Pacific Motorway (M3/M1) connects the inner-city with the southern suburbs, Gold Coast and New South Wales. The Ipswich Motorway (M7/M2) connects the inner-city with the outer south-western suburbs. The Western Freeway and Centenary Motorway (M5) connect the city's inner-west and outer south-west. The Bruce Highway and Gympie Arterial Road (M1/M3) connect the city's northern suburbs with the Sunshine Coast and northern Queensland. The Logan Motorway (M2/M6) connects the southern and south-western suburbs. The Gateway Motorway is a toll road which connects the Gold and Sunshine Coast. The Port of Brisbane Motorway links the Gateway Motorway to the Port of Brisbane. The Inner City Bypass and Riverside Expressway serve as an inner ring freeway system to prevent motorists from travelling through the city's congested centre.

Brisbane also has a large network of major road tunnels under the metropolitan area, known as the TransApex network, which include the Clem Jones Tunnel between the inner-north and inner-south, the Airport Link tunnel in the north-east and the Legacy Way tunnel in the south-west. They are the three longest road tunnels in Australia.

==== Bridges ====
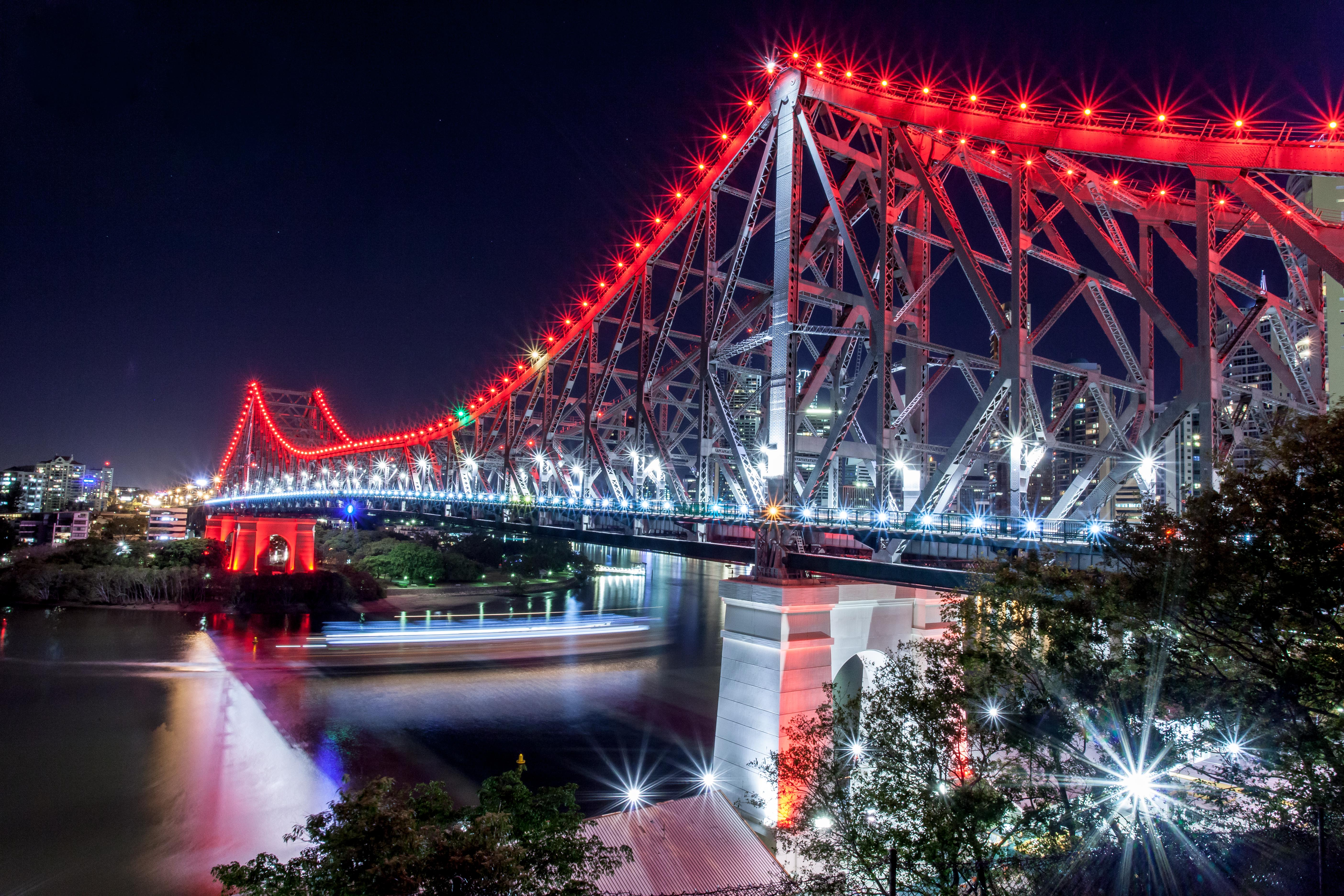
The 777-metre Story Bridge, completed in 1940

The Brisbane River creates a barrier to road transport routes. In total there are eighteen bridges over the river, mostly concentrated in the inner city area. The road bridges (which usually also include provision for pedestrians and cyclists) by distance from the river mouth are the Sir Leo Hielscher Bridges, the Story Bridge, the Captain Cook Bridge, the Victoria Bridge, the William Jolly Bridge, the Go Between Bridge, the Eleanor Schonell Bridge, the Walter Taylor Bridge the Centenary Bridge, and the Colleges Crossing. There are three railway bridges, namely the Merivale Bridge, the Albert Bridge and the Indooroopilly Railway Bridge. There are also five pedestrian only bridges: the Kangaroo Point Bridge, the Goodwill Bridge, the Neville Bonner Bridge, the Kurilpa Bridge and the Jack Pesch Bridge.

The Houghton Highway (northbound) and Ted Smout Memorial Bridge (southbound) bridges, over Bramble Bay between Brighton, Queensland and the Redcliffe Peninsula, are the longest bridges in the state. The abutment arches of the original crossing The Hornibrook Bridge still remain in place.

==== Public transport ====
Public transport in Brisbane consists of bus, bus rapid transit, suburban rail and ferry services, which form part of the wider South East Queensland public transport network. Most services are coordinated by Translink, a division of the Queensland Government's Department of Transport and Main Roads. Brisbane City Council operates the city's principal bus network through Transport for Brisbane, while Queensland Rail operates suburban passenger train services and RiverCity Ferries operates passenger ferry services on the Brisbane River.

The network is centred on the Brisbane central business district (CBD), where railway stations, busway stations and ferry terminals provide connections between transport modes. Major interchanges include Roma Street, Central and Fortitude Valley railway stations, the Queen Street and King George Square busway stations, and ferry terminals along the central Brisbane River. Suburban transport interchanges connect residential areas with the CBD and other employment, education and activity centres throughout metropolitan Brisbane.

===== Bus services =====
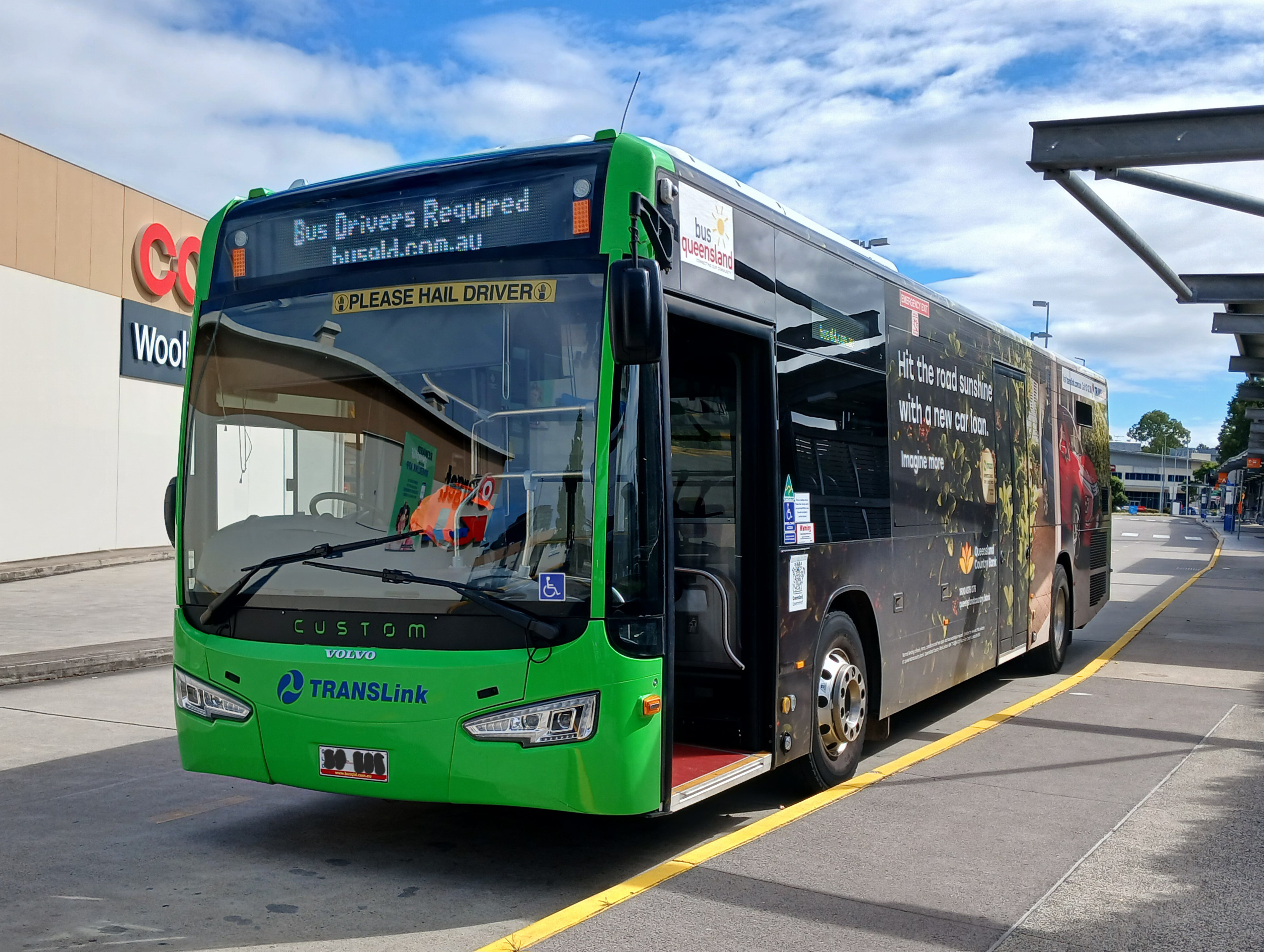
Translink bus

Buses form a major part of Brisbane's public transport network, serving the CBD, suburban centres, residential neighbourhoods and destinations not directly served by rail. Services are operated by Brisbane City Council and private bus operators under arrangements coordinated by Translink. The network includes local and express routes, high-frequency services, school services and connections to railway stations and ferry terminals.

Transport for Brisbane operates several high-frequency service categories, including Bus Upgrade Zone (BUZ) routes and CityGlider services. BUZ routes provide frequent services on major corridors, while CityGlider routes connect inner-city neighbourhoods, commercial precincts, universities and transport interchanges. Free bus loops also operate in the city centre and Spring Hill.

Brisbane's bus network is supported by a series of dedicated busways, which allow buses to bypass road congestion along major commuter corridors. These facilities form an important part of the city's public transport infrastructure.

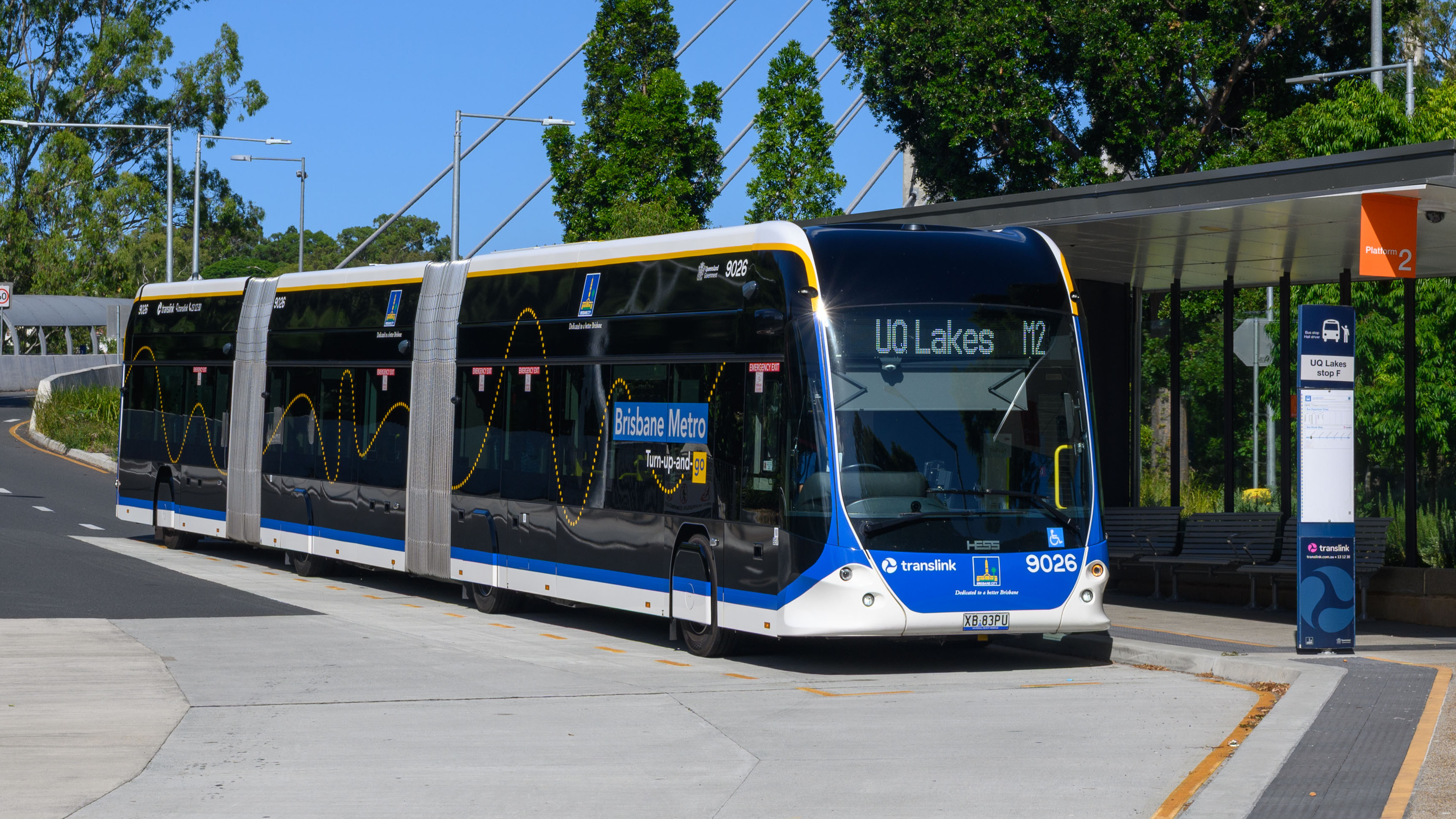
A Brisbane Metro Vechile at UQ Lakes Busway Station

====== Busways and Brisbane Metro ======
Brisbane has a dedicated busway network comprising the South East Busway, Northern Busway and Eastern Busway. The corridors use bus-only roads, tunnels, bridges and stations to provide faster and more reliable journeys between suburban areas and the inner city. Busways also allow services from different operators to use the same infrastructure, improving connections between the CBD and surrounding local government areas.

The South East Busway extends south from the city towards Eight Mile Plains and provides connections to major suburban centres and the wider Logan area. The Northern Busway serves northern inner-city and suburban destinations, while the Eastern Busway provides a dedicated corridor towards the University of Queensland and the city's eastern suburbs. The network connects with the broader road system at multiple points and shares interchanges with rail services.

Brisbane Metro is a high-capacity bus rapid transit system that uses the existing busway infrastructure. Its M1 route connects Eight Mile Plains with Roma Street, while the M2 route links the University of Queensland at UQ Lakes with the Royal Brisbane and Women's Hospital. The service uses high-capacity, bi-articulated electric vehicles and was introduced to increase passenger capacity and improve service frequency on major inner-city corridors.

Metro services began operating in stages in 2025, alongside changes to the wider Brisbane bus network. Infrastructure associated with the project includes upgrades to busway stations, the Adelaide Street tunnel, improvements to the Cultural Centre and Buranda stations, and changes to Victoria Bridge, which accommodates public transport, pedestrians and cyclists. Brisbane Metro operates as a bus rapid transit system rather than a conventional rail-based metro.

===== Rail services =====
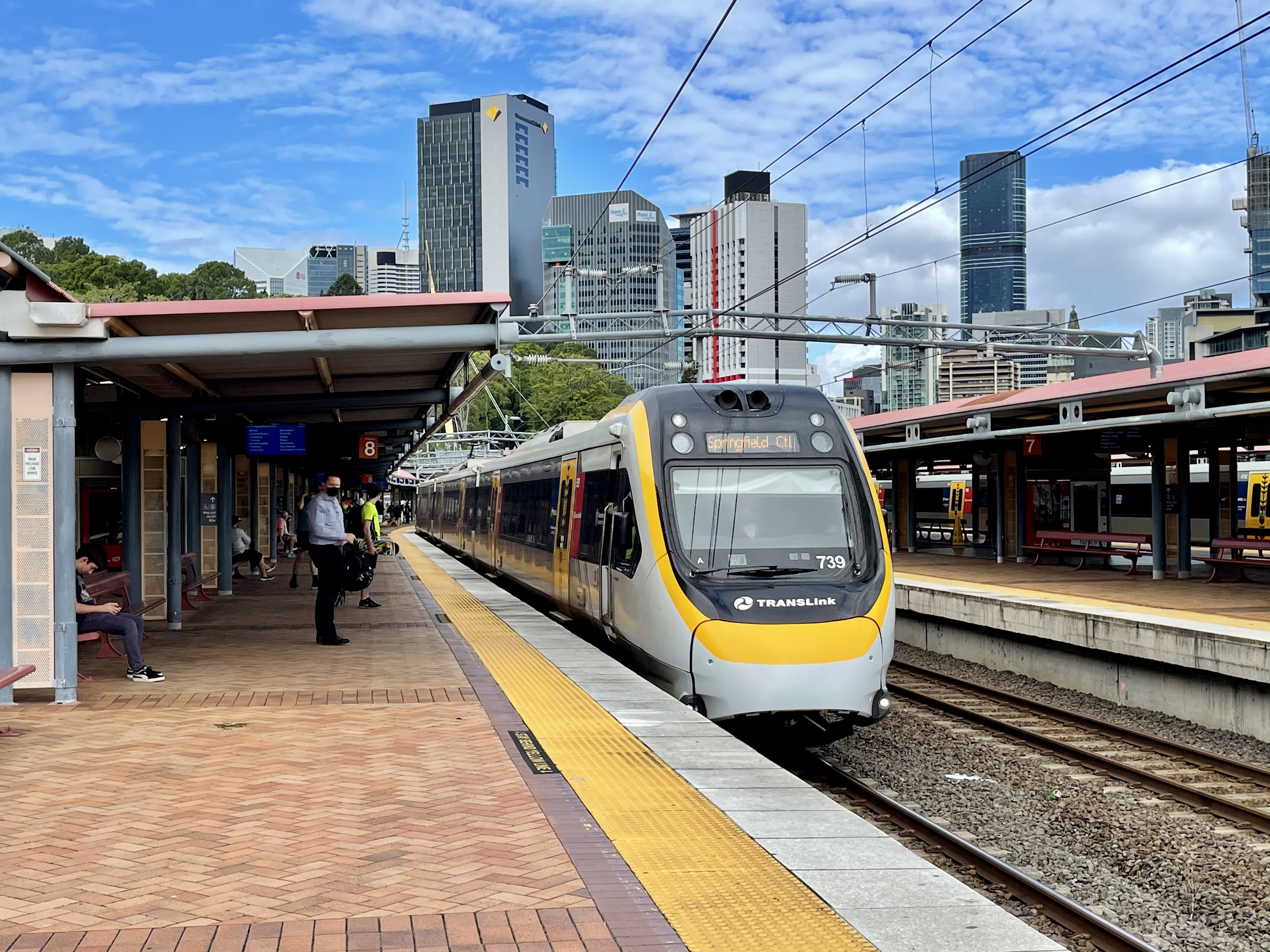
A Queensland Rail NGR train approaching Roma Street station

Brisbane is served by the Queensland Rail City network, a suburban and regional passenger rail system linking the CBD with northern, southern, eastern and western suburbs. The network also connects Brisbane with surrounding centres, including Ipswich, Springfield, the Redlands area and the Gold Coast. Services extend beyond the City of Brisbane into neighbouring local government areas and form part of the wider South East Queensland rail network.

The principal railway stations in central Brisbane are Central, Roma Street and Fortitude Valley. Roma Street is also a major interchange for long-distance passenger rail services and intercity coach connections. Other important stations include South Brisbane, Bowen Hills, Boggo Road and Indooroopilly, which serve inner-city destinations, employment centres and connections with other transport services.

The suburban rail network comprises 6 lines radiating from the CBD. These include the T1 Ispwich - Nambour, T2 Springfield - Kippa-Ring, T3 Doomben - Roma Street, T4 Cleveland - Shorncliffe, T5 Varsity Lakes - Brisbane Aiport and the T6 Beeleigh - Ferny Groove. Some services operate beyond Greater Brisbane's suburban boundaries, reflecting the integrated nature of rail transport across South East Queensland.

The T6 Airport line connects the CBD with Brisbane Airport's domestic and international terminals. Separate Airtrain services operate on this corridor and have different fare arrangements from the standard Translink network.

===== Ferries =====
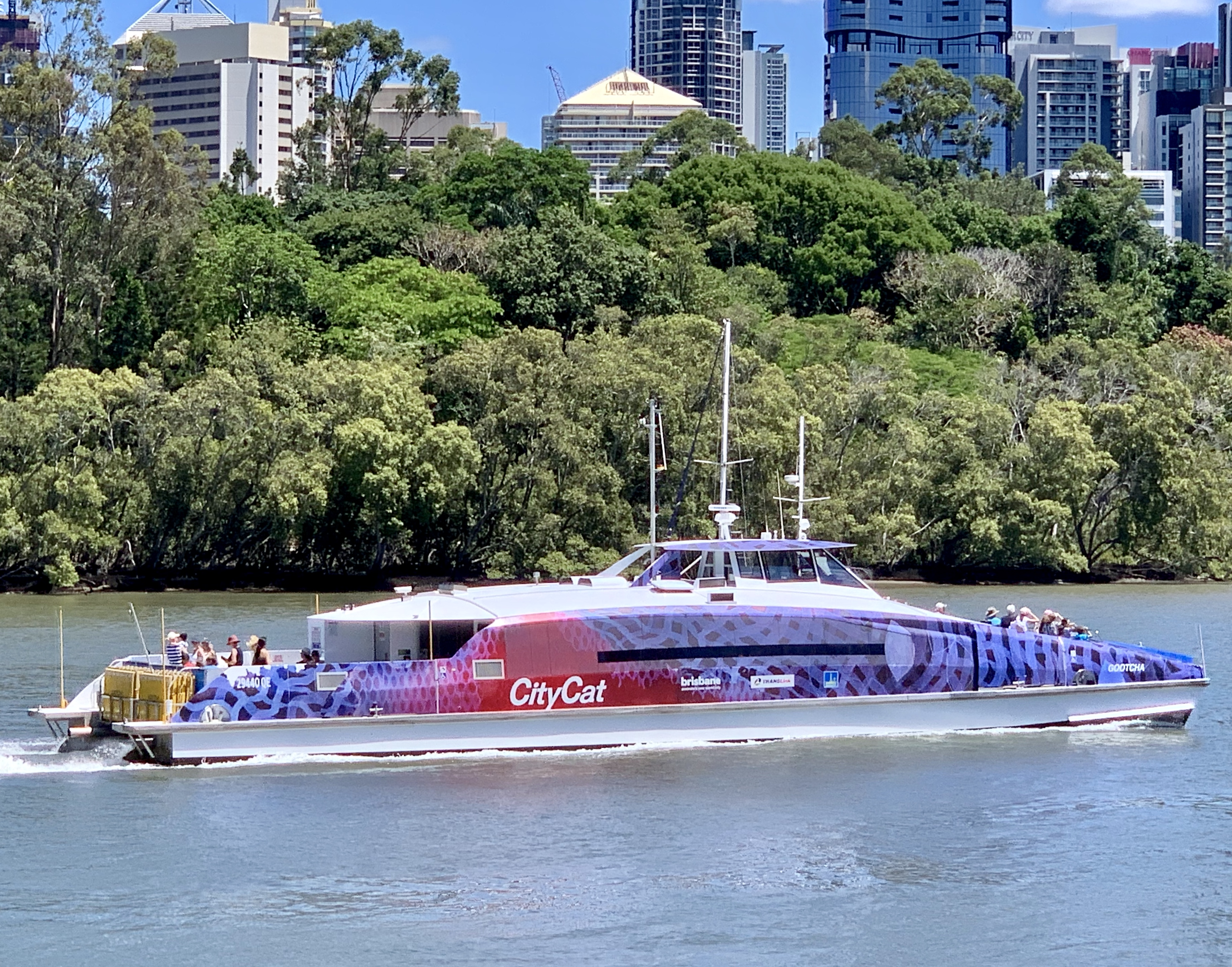
CityCat ferry passing the City Botanic Gardens at Gardens Point

RiverCity Ferries operates three ferry services along the Brisbane River, CityCat, Cross River and CityHopper. Brisbane's ferries, and particularly its catamaran CityCats, are considered iconic to the city.

The CityCat high-speed catamaran ferry service, popular with tourists and commuters, operates services along the Brisbane River between the University of Queensland and Northshore Hamilton, with wharves at UQ St Lucia, West End, Guyatt Park, Regatta, Milton, North Quay, South Bank, QUT Gardens Point, Riverside, Sydney Street, Mowbray Park, New Farm Park, Hawthorne, Bulimba, Teneriffe, Bretts Wharf, Apollo Road, and Northshore Hamilton.

The Cross River services operate smaller vessels for popular cross-river routes, namely: Bulimba–Teneriffe and Holman Street–Riverside.

The free CityHopper service operates smaller vessels along a route between North Quay and Sydney Street, stopping at South Bank, Maritime Museum, Riverside and Holman Street.

There are tourist passenger ferries that depart the Brisbane River at Pinkenba to Tangalooma on Moreton Island four times daily, and Micat 4WD car ferries that depart from the Port of Brisbane daily.

===== Ticketing and network integration =====
Public transport services in Brisbane are integrated with the wider Translink network through common journey-planning information and ticketing arrangements. Passengers can use a go card, eligible contactless debit or credit cards and digital wallets, as well as approved paper tickets where available. The contactless Smart Ticketing system has been introduced across South East Queensland's bus, train, ferry and tram services.

In August 2024, Queensland introduced a 50-cent flat fare initiative, which was subsequently made permanent. The fare applies to most Translink services across South East Queensland, including buses, suburban trains and ferries, but excludes Airtrain services and certain other services.

The network also includes late-night services, accessible vehicles and stations, park-and-ride facilities and interchanges designed to connect suburban communities with major transport corridors. Service frequencies, operating hours and available facilities vary by route and location.

===== Transport infrastructure projects =====
Major infrastructure projects have sought to increase the capacity of Brisbane's public transport network and improve connections between the CBD and surrounding suburbs.

Cross River Rail is a rail infrastructure project involving a new underground railway crossing beneath the Brisbane River and central Brisbane. The project includes new underground stations at Boggo Road, Woolloongabba, Albert Street and Roma Street, as well as upgrades to existing railway infrastructure.

===== Pedestrian =====
An extensive network of pedestrian and cyclist pathways span the banks of the Brisbane River in the inner suburbs to form the Riverwalk network. In some segments, the Riverwalk is built over the river. The longest span of the Riverwalk connects Newstead in the east with Toowong in the west.

===== Airports =====
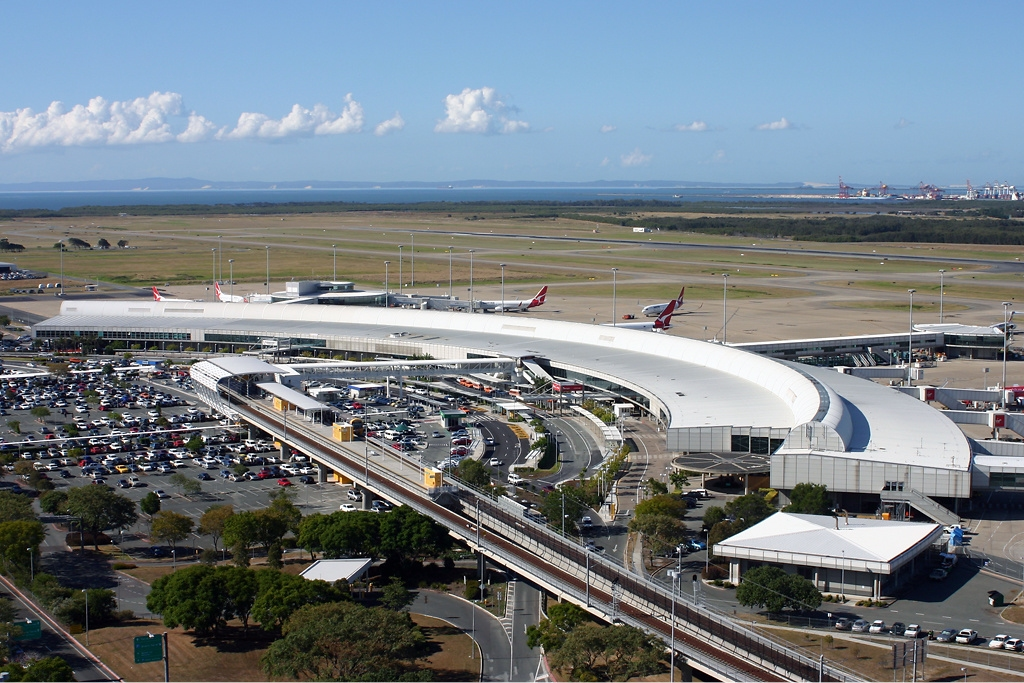
Domestic terminal at Brisbane Airport

Brisbane Airport (IATA: BNE, ICAO: YBBN) is the city's main airport, the third busiest in Australia after Sydney Airport and Melbourne Airport. It is located north-east of the city centre on Moreton Bay and provides domestic and international passenger services. In 2017, Brisbane Airport handled over 23 million passengers. The airport is the main hub for Virgin Australia as well as a number of minor and freight airlines, and a focus city for Qantas and Jetstar. The airport is served by the Airtrain service which runs on the Airport line, providing a direct service to the CBD.

Archerfield Airport in Brisbane's southern suburbs, Redcliffe Airport on the Redcliffe Peninsula and Caboolture Airfield in the far north of the metropolitan area serve Brisbane as general aviation airports.

Brisbane is also served by other major airports in South East Queensland, including Gold Coast Airport at Coolangatta, Sunshine Coast Airport at Marcoola, and Toowoomba Wellcamp Airport at Wellcamp.

===== Seaport =====
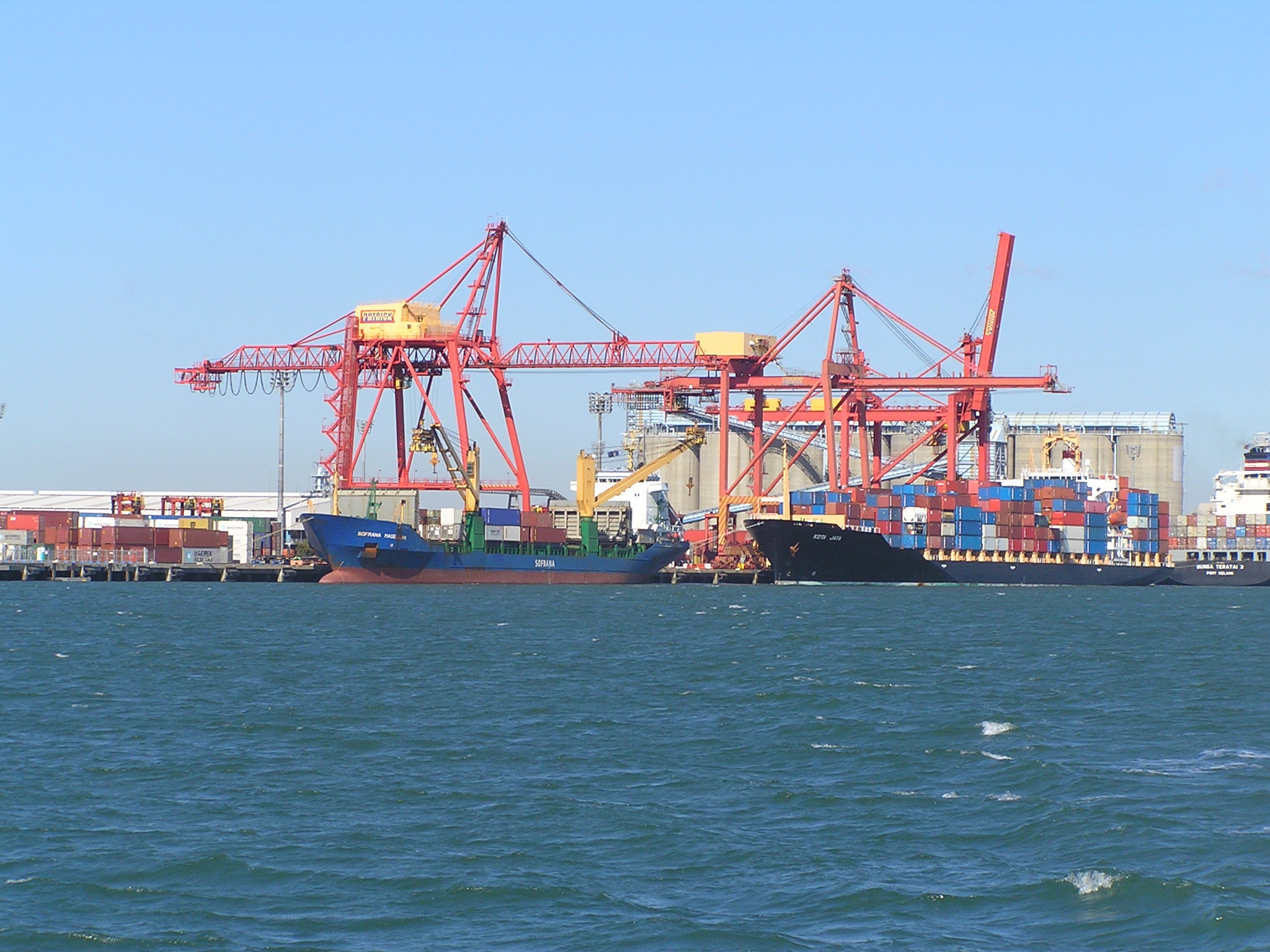
The Port of Brisbane, Australia's third-busiest seaport

The Port of Brisbane is located on the south side of the mouth of the Brisbane River on Moreton Bay and on the adjacent Fisherman's Island, an artificial island created by land reclamation. It is the third busiest port in Australia for value of goods. The port is the endpoint of the main shipping channel across Moreton Bay which extends 90 kilometres north near Mooloolaba. The port has 29 operating berths including nine deep-water container berths and three deep-water bulk berths as well as 17 bulk and general cargo berths.

There are two cruise ship terminals in Brisbane. Portside Wharf on the north side of the river at Hamilton is an international standard facility for cruise liners. Due to the height of the Gateway Bridge which must be passed to reach the terminal, the wharf services small and medium-sized cruise ships. The Brisbane International Cruise Terminal at Luggage Point in Pinkenba on the north side of the river opposite the Port of Brisbane is able to accommodate the largest cruise vessels in the world.

=== Healthcare ===
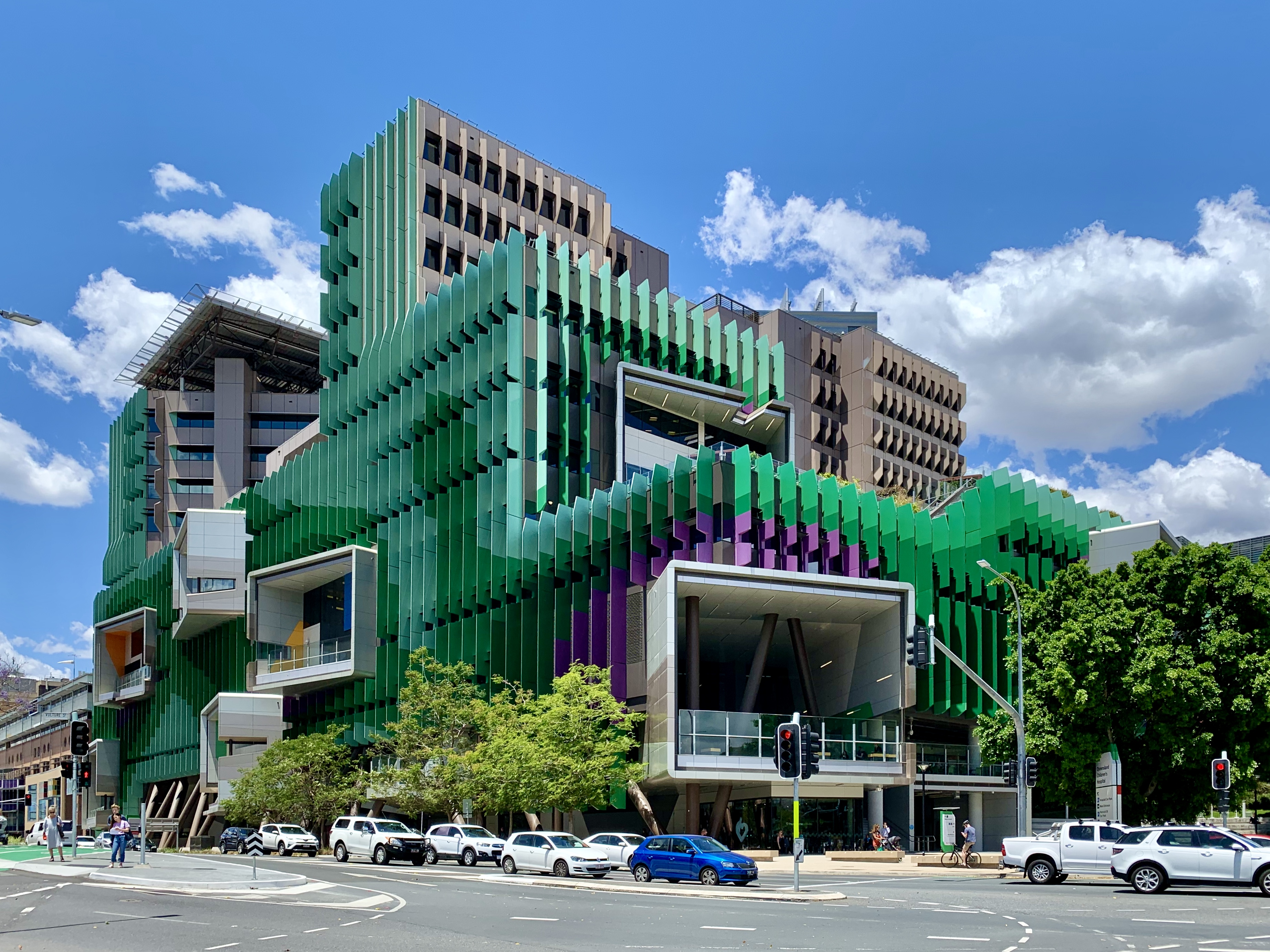
The Queensland Children's Hospital at South Brisbane

Brisbane is covered by Queensland Health's Hospital and Health Services (divided in Metro North, Metro South and Children's Health Queensland). Within the greater Brisbane area there are eight major public hospitals, four major private hospitals, and numerous smaller public and private facilities. The Royal Brisbane and Women's Hospital and the Princess Alexandra Hospital are two of Queensland's three major trauma centres. Standing alone, they are the largest hospitals in Australia. The Princess Alexandra Hospital houses the Translational Research Institute (Australia) along with the state's renal and liver transplant services. The Royal Brisbane and Women's Hospital includes a specialist burns unit. The Prince Charles Hospital is the state's major cardiac transplant centre. Other major public hospitals include the Queensland Children's Hospital, the Queen Elizabeth II Jubilee Hospital, and the Mater Hospital.

Specialist and general medical practices are located in the CBD, and most suburbs and localities.

Brisbane is also home to the headquarters of the Queensland Ambulance Service central executive, located at the Emergency Services Complex Kedron Park, along with the headquarters of the Queensland Fire Department and the Queensland Emergency Operations Centre.

=== Other utilities ===
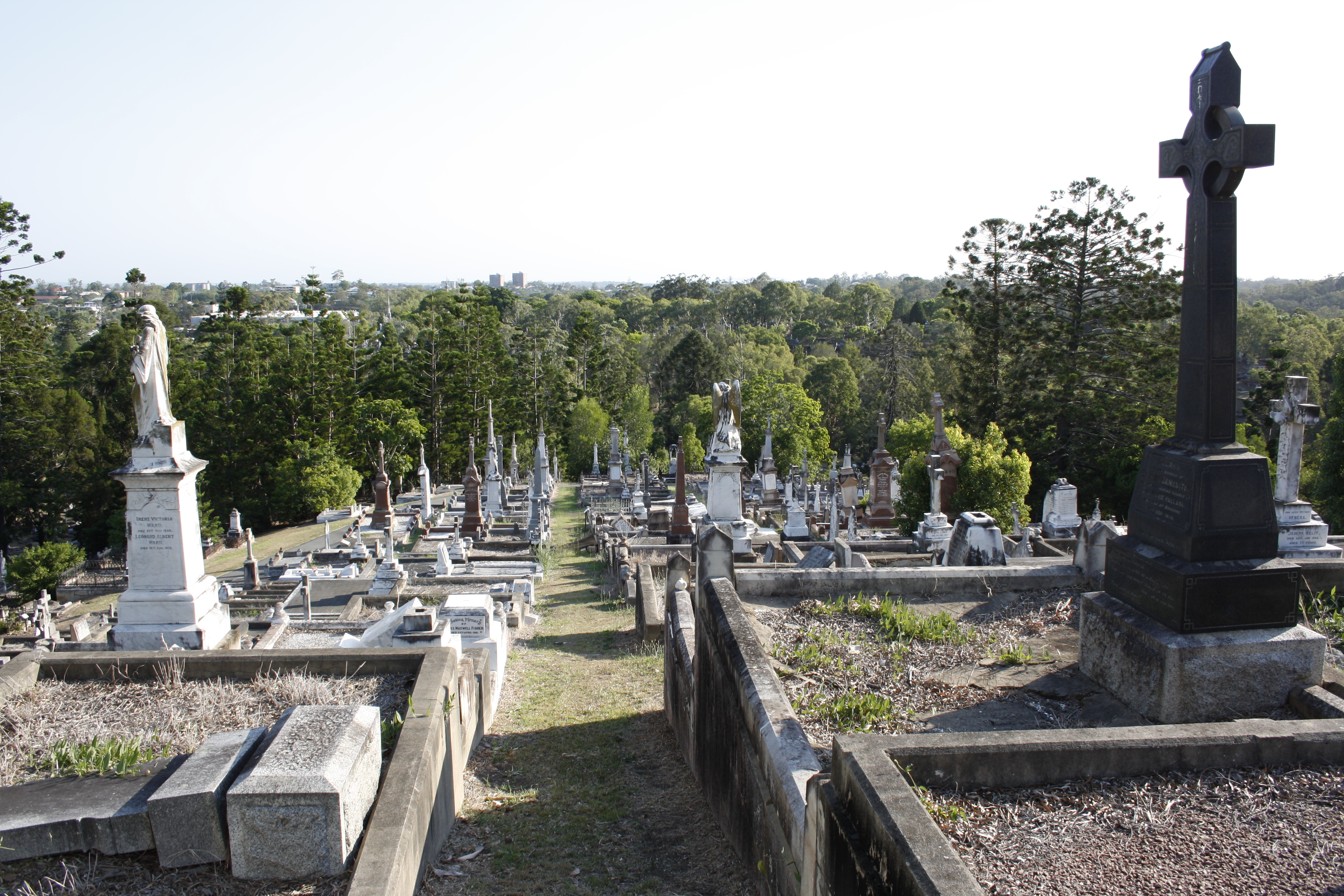
Toowong Cemetery, opened in 1875, Queensland's largest cemetery

Water in Brisbane is managed by two statutory authorities: Seqwater and Urban Utilities. Bulk water storage, treatment and transportation for South East Queensland is managed by Seqwater, with Urban Utilities (previously Brisbane Water) responsible for distribution to the greater Brisbane area. Water for the area is stored in three major dams to the north-west of the metropolitan area: Wivenhoe, Somerset and North Pine.

The provision of electricity in Brisbane is managed by government and private bodies. Generators (some private and some owned by the Queensland government) sell energy into the wholesale market for eastern Australia known as the National Electricity Market. Transmission and distribution of electricity is managed by the Queensland government owned corporations Energex and Powerlink Queensland respectively. Private retailers then purchase electricity from the wholesale market and sell it to consumers, which have the ability to choose between different retailers in a partially de-regulated market.

The supply of gas to users is more heavily privatised, with the private APA Group distributing gas in Brisbane, which is then bought and sold by retailers (mainly Origin Energy and AGL Energy) in a partially de-regulated market.

Metropolitan Brisbane is serviced by all major and most minor telecommunications companies and their networks, including Telstra, Optus, and Vodafone Australia.

Brisbane is home to numerous cemeteries including the following large 19th-century historical cemeteries: the 44-hectare Toowong Cemetery (the largest cemetery in Queensland, which is a popular destination for walkers and joggers), Balmoral Cemetery, Lutwyche Cemetery, Nudgee Cemetery, Nundah Cemetery, and South Brisbane Cemetery.

== Media ==
=== Print ===
The main local print newspapers of Brisbane are The Courier-Mail and its sibling The Sunday Mail, both owned by News Corporation. Brisbane also receives the national daily, The Australian and its sibling the Weekend Australian.

The Brisbane Times is Brisbane's second major local news source, owned by Nine, and is online only. Its sibling papers, The Sydney Morning Herald and Melbourne's The Age are sometimes sold in print in Brisbane in small numbers. The national broadsheet Australian Financial Review, also owned by Nine, is sold in print in Brisbane.

There are community and suburban newspapers throughout the metropolitan area, including Brisbane News and City News, many of which are produced by Quest Community Newspapers.

=== Television ===
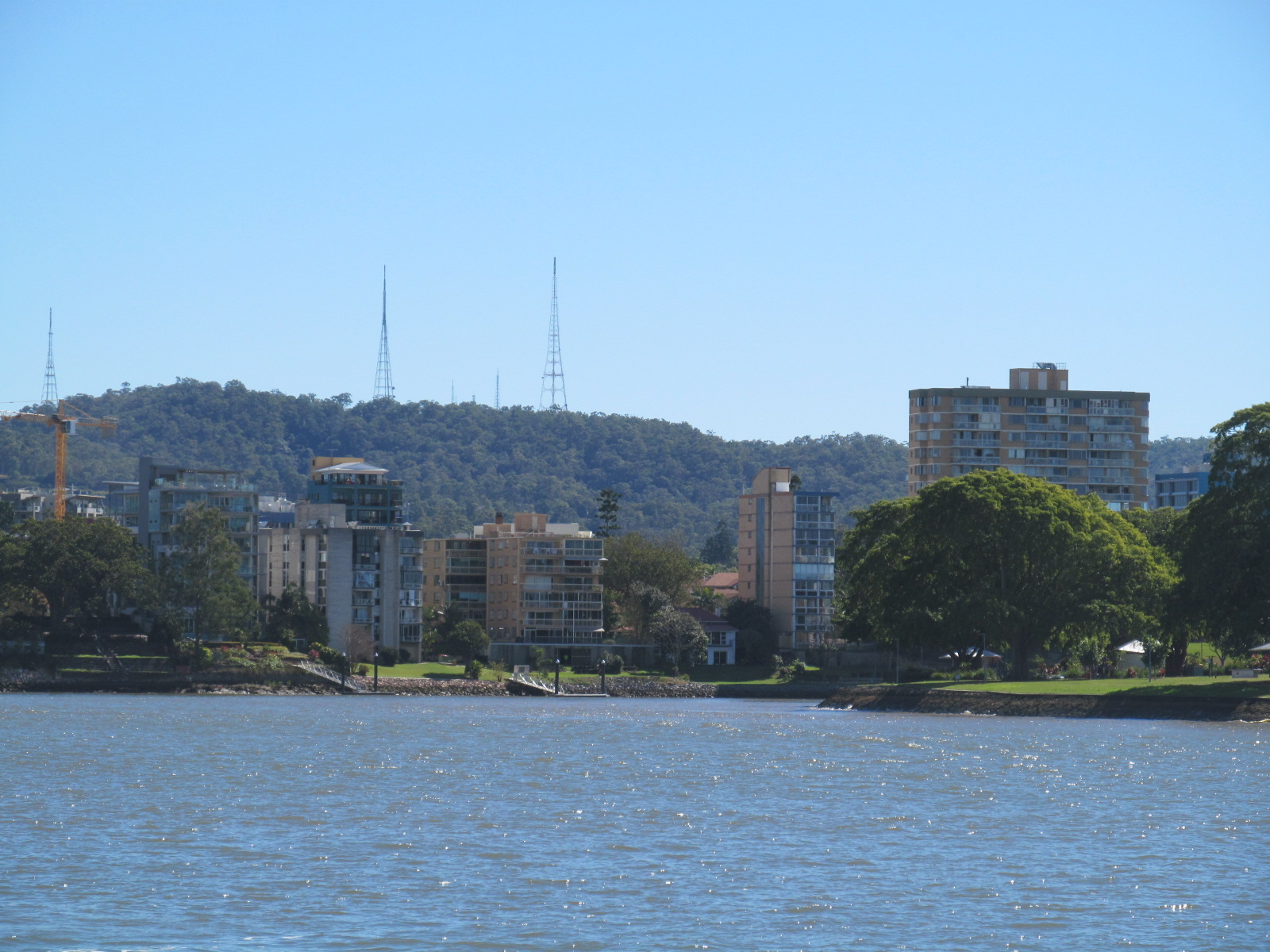
Television transmission towers atop Mount Coot-tha

Brisbane is served by all five major television networks in Australia, which broadcast from prominent television transmission towers on the summit of Mount Coot-tha. The three commercial stations, Seven, Nine, and 10, are accompanied by two government networks, ABC and SBS. Channels provided by these networks include 10 HD (10 broadcast in HD), 10 Drama, 10 Comedy, Nickelodeon, TVSN, ABC TV HD (ABC TV broadcast in HD), ABC Family/ABC Kids, ABC Entertains, ABC News, SBS HD (SBS broadcast in HD), SBS World Movies, SBS2 (SBS2 broadcast in HD), SBS Food, NITV, SBS WorldWatch, 7HD (Seven broadcast in HD), 7two, 7mate, 7flix, 7mate HD (7mate broadcast in HD), Racing.com, 9HD (Nine broadcast in HD), 9Gem, 9Go!, 9Life, 9Gem HD (9Gem broadcast in HD) and 9Rush. 31 Digital, a community station, also broadcast in Brisbane until 2017. Optus and Foxtel operates Pay TV services in Brisbane, via cable and satellite means.

=== Radio ===
Brisbane is serviced by five major public radio stations including major commercial radio stations, including ABC Radio Brisbane (local news, current affairs and talk); ABC Radio National (national news and current affairs); ABC NewsRadio (national news); ABC Classic (classical music); Triple J (alternative music); and SBS Radio (multicultural broadcasting).

Brisbane is serviced by numerous major commercial and community radio stations including 4BC (local and national talk, news and current affairs); SENQ (sport); 4BH (classic hits); KIIS 97.3 (pop); B105 (pop); Nova 106.9 (top 40); Triple M (rock); 96five Family FM (Christian/pop); Radio TAB (betting); and 4MBS (classical).

Brisbane is also serviced by community radio stations such as VAC Radio (Mandarin); Radio Brisvaani (Hindi); Radio Arabic (Arabic); 4EB (multiple languages); 98.9 FM (indigenous); 4RPH (vision impaired); Switch 1197 (youth broadcasting); 4ZZZ (community radio); and Vision Christian Radio (Christian). Additional channels are also available via DAB digital radio.

== See also ==
- List of Brisbane suburbs
- List of museums in Brisbane
- List of people from Brisbane
