= E-toll =

E-toll may refer to:

- E-toll (Indonesia)
- e-toll (South Africa)
- E-toll (Service NSW competitor to Linkt)

== See also ==
- eToll (Ireland)
- e-TAG (Australia)
- E-ZPass (northeastern USA)
- Electronic toll collection
