= Clem Jones Tunnel =

Motorway tunnel in Brisbane, Australia

Clem Jones Tunnel (CLEM7) North–South Bypass Tunnel
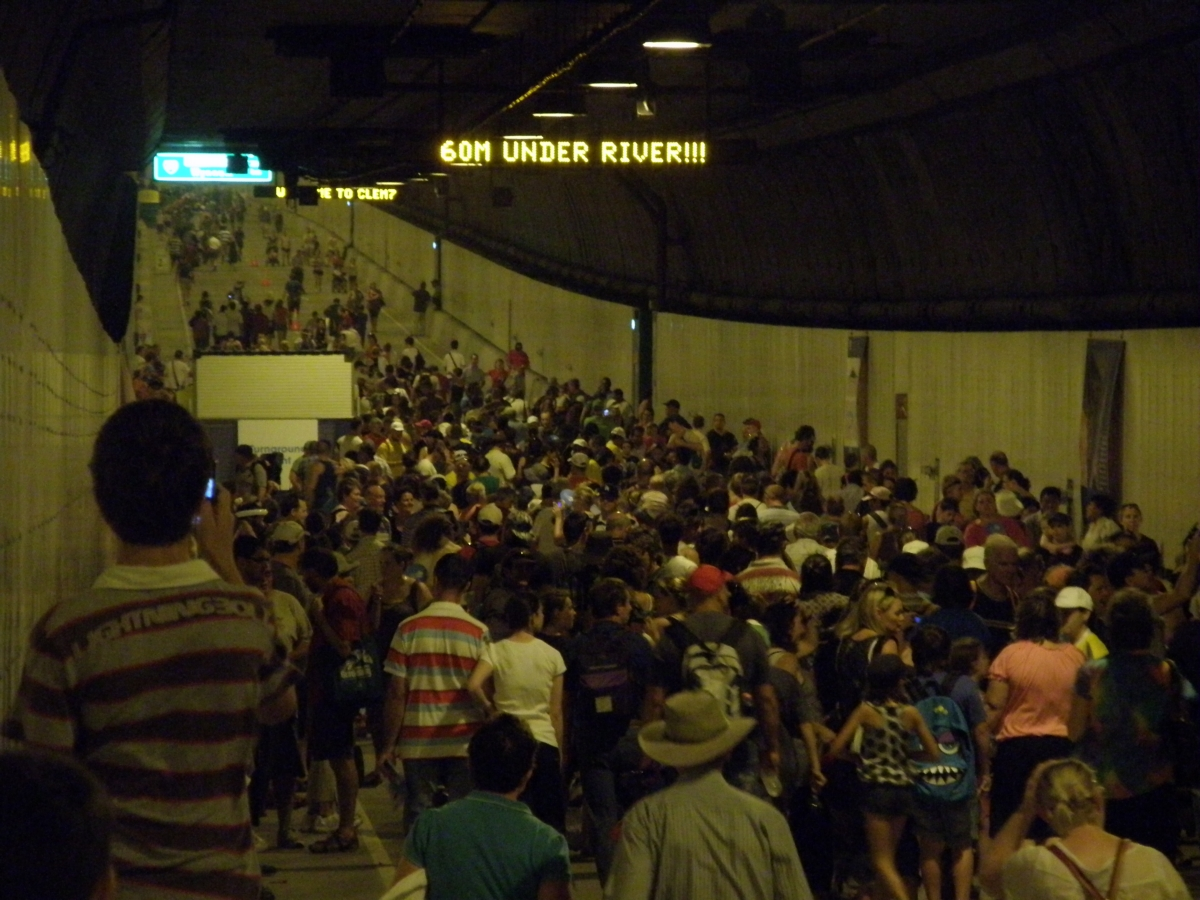
- Tunnel, 60 metres (200 ft) under the Brisbane River, during the Clem7 Community Open Day
- Interactive map of Clem Jones Tunnel (CLEM7); North–South Bypass Tunnel

Overview
- Location: Brisbane River
- Coordinates: 27°27′48.38″S 153°02′07.30″E
- Status: Open
- Route: M7
- Start: Airport Link; Inner City Bypass, Bowen Hills
- End: Shafston Avenue; Pacific Motorway; Ipswich Road, Woolloongabba

Operation
- Work began: September 2006
- Opened: 15 March 2010; 16 years ago
- Operator: RiverCity Motorway (2010–2013); Queensland Motorways (2013–2015); Transurban Queensland (since 2015)
- Traffic: Automotive
- Character: Motorway
- Toll: $2.64–$15.85 (2020–2021)
- Vehicles per day: 28,000

Technical
- Length: 4.8 km (3.0 mi)
- No. of lanes: 4 total in 2 parallel tubes
- Operating speed: 80 km/h (50 mph)
- Tunnel clearance: 4.6 m (15 ft)

The M7 Clem Jones Tunnel (CLEM7), known during its development as the North–South Bypass Tunnel (NSBT), is a A$3.2 billion motorway grade toll road under the Brisbane River, between Woolloongabba and Bowen Hills in Brisbane, Queensland. The tunnel was progressively opened to traffic from late on 15 March 2010 until just after midnight on 16 March 2010. It was completely open by 12:02 am.

The tunnel was originally proposed by Labor Lord Mayor Jim Soorley in 2001, and was incorporated into the Liberal Party candidate Campbell Newman's five tunnel vision, called TransApex, in 2002. In December 2007, Brisbane City Council decided to name the tunnel the Clem Jones Tunnel in honour of the former Lord Mayor of Brisbane. On 16 July 2008, the Government of Queensland announced that the tunnel "heralds Queensland's newest motorway - the M7".

It is Brisbane's first privately financed inner city toll road, the city's largest road infrastructure project and one of Queensland's largest infrastructure projects. With a length of 4.8 km (3.0 mi) it was the longest road tunnel in the country until the 6.7 km (4.2 mi) Airport Link tunnel was completed.

Construction bids were provided by a tender process in which RiverCity Motorway was selected over the Brisconnections consortium. The project commenced in September 2006, with tunneling using two very large tunnel boring machines completed by May 2009. The tunnel is tolled via an electronic tolling system. It includes extensive safety systems, a traffic control centre and speed cameras. The price of the toll has been criticised as too expensive and the ventilation stacks as too intrusive.

Patronage decreased by more than 65% in the week following the introduction of a reduced toll period, and remains considerably lower than predicted volumes. Despite being completed on time and on budget, the tunnel has been an economic failure due to incorrect predictions of traffic volume. RiverCity Motorway did not collect enough tolls to pay the interest on its $1.3 billion debt and went into receivership. With no hope of profit and therefore no dividend, RiverCity Motorways shares are now worthless, costing investors millions.

On 25 February 2011, Rivercity Motorways was placed into receivership after being unable to pay interest on its debt. In December 2013, Queensland Motorways, operator of the Gateway and Logan motorways, took over tolling and operation of CLEM7. In July 2014, Queensland Motorways was acquired by a consortium (Transurban Queensland) led by toll road operator Transurban, which now manages and operates the tunnel.

== Design ==
The motorway is designed to alleviate traffic congestion in the rapidly growing city, especially in the congested central business district and Fortitude Valley. The major benefit of the 6.8 km (4.2 mi) toll road is that it bypasses 24 sets of traffic lights, potentially saving 15 minutes of travel time, and provides an additional Brisbane River crossing. The concrete road includes 4.8 km (3.0 mi) of tunnel and 18 bridges. It has two lanes of traffic in each direction via parallel tubes. There are 41 cross-passages spaced every 120 metres (390 ft) in the tunnel for use in emergencies. Access from the southern end is via Shaftson Avenue, Ipswich Road and the Pacific Motorway. Northern connections include Lutwyche Road, the Inner City Bypass and the Airport Link tunnel.

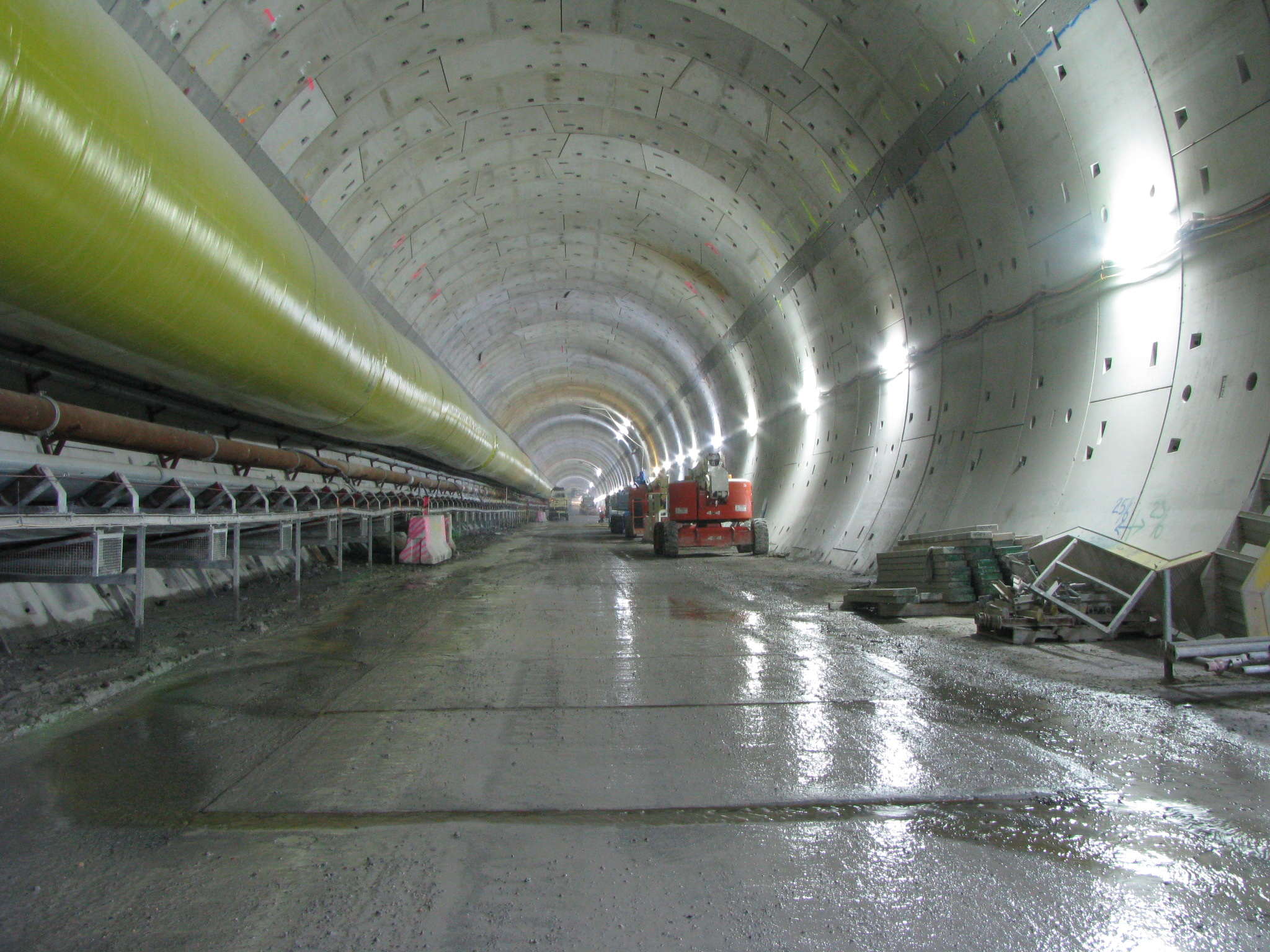
Tunnel under construction

There is a smoke reduction ceiling to rapidly draw out smoke in case of a fire or explosion. The ventilation system incorporates 100 jet fans. The speed limit is 80 km/h (50 mph) and there are 165 emergency phones. The eight speed cameras form Queensland's highest concentration of fixed speed detection devices and have been justified as a way of reducing the potential for high-speed crashes. A traffic control centre staffed by 50 personnel continually monitors the tunnel using 250 cameras.

Steel and aluminium sculptures at the entrances act as transitional light filters. They were designed by architect John Ilett, who also designed the colourful exhaust fume stacks. The red and purple colours were inspired by the jacaranda and poinciana trees. Included in the design are a series of urban enhancements such as parklands and road widening in adjacent suburbs.

== History ==
=== Tender process ===
The successful tenderer, RiverCity Motorway was announced by Brisbane Lord Mayor Campbell Newman on 27 April 2006, beating a bid by the Brisconnections consortium. Contracts for design and construction were awarded to Leighton Contractors and a Baulderstone/Bilfinger Berger joint venture. Transurban declined to place a tender because of risk-return factors.

The losing bid by the Brisconnections consortium incorporated three lanes of traffic in each direction (as opposed to two lanes for the winning bid). With a price difference of A$20 million the decision to build a two-lane tunnel was criticised in some circles as short-sighted. Brisconnections won the tender for the Airport Link with a similarly aggressive bid that requires almost double the traffic anticipated by government to be successful.

One of the reasons for building the tunnel as a public-private partnership was that it should reduce Brisbane City Council's risks regarding construction and operation. However, the public disclosure documents released by Rivercity Motorway indicate that there are still considerable uncosted risks left with Council. For example, a 10 m extension was required for the exhaust stack at the Woolloongabba end of the tunnel and the full cost by the council.

=== Public offering ===
The initial offer was for shares at $1.00 with 50% deferred for 12 months. The shares were listed on the ASX at $0.46, 8% below the offer price, and by August 2010 have traded for as little as $0.019. Dividends were discontinued in September 2008. The ASX issuer code for the Rivercity Motorway Group is RCY.

The tunnel was acquired by Queensland Motorways in a $618 million deal with the RiverCity Motorway receivers in 2013. A Transurban-led consortium acquired Queensland Motorways and its road assets in July 2014.

=== Construction ===
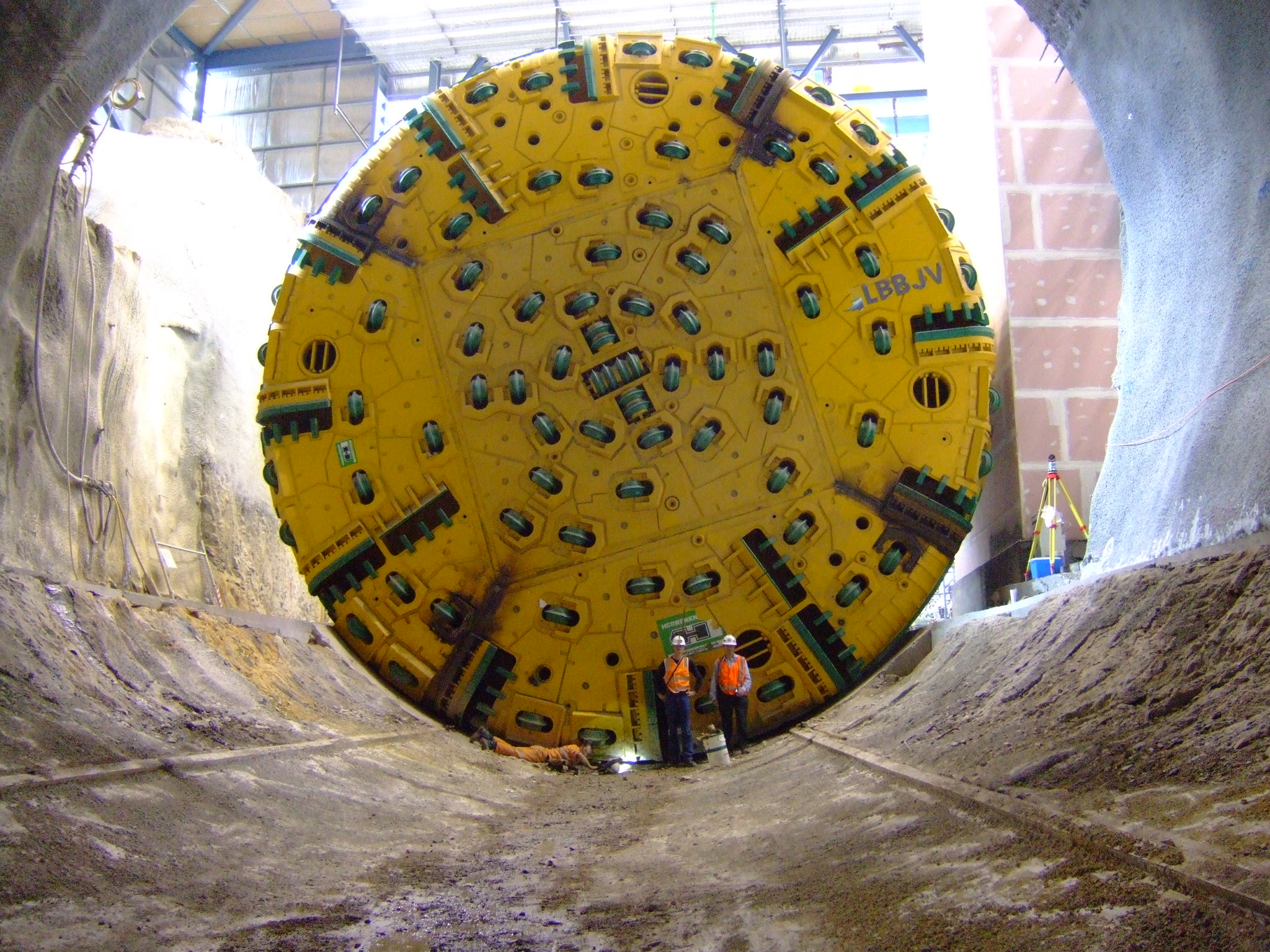
The boring machine dubbed Matilda

Construction commenced in September 2006. At the start of the project it was the longest road tunnel being built in the country. 3.5 million tonnes of excavated rock was removed by conveyor, stored in silos and taken away by truck. During a typical weekday period more than 25 trucks per hour were hauling removed soil and rock along Kingsford Smith Drive to an area near the Brisbane Airport.

During construction all 1,700 staff and visitors inside the tunnel could be located at any time using an RFID tagging system that transmits a person's location wirelessly. The system was designed to monitor site access and asset location and improve safety and efficiency in a high-profile and potentially hazardous worksite.

Difficult drilling conditions, due to the very hard Brisbane tuff rock under inner Brisbane, were encountered and overcome. Both purpose-built double-shield boring machines began on the northern end, with the first arriving in Brisbane in July 2007 and cutting commencing in December after testing. At the time, the tunneling machines were the biggest in the world, weighing 4,000 tonnes and being 250 m (820 ft) in length. Each machine cost A$50 million to build. The boring machines of 12.34 m (40.5 ft) diameter each were built by the German firm Herrenknecht and can dig up to 20 m (66 ft) per day. When finished the boring machines had placed 37,000 precast linings. Smaller roadheader machines began from the southern end in February 2007.

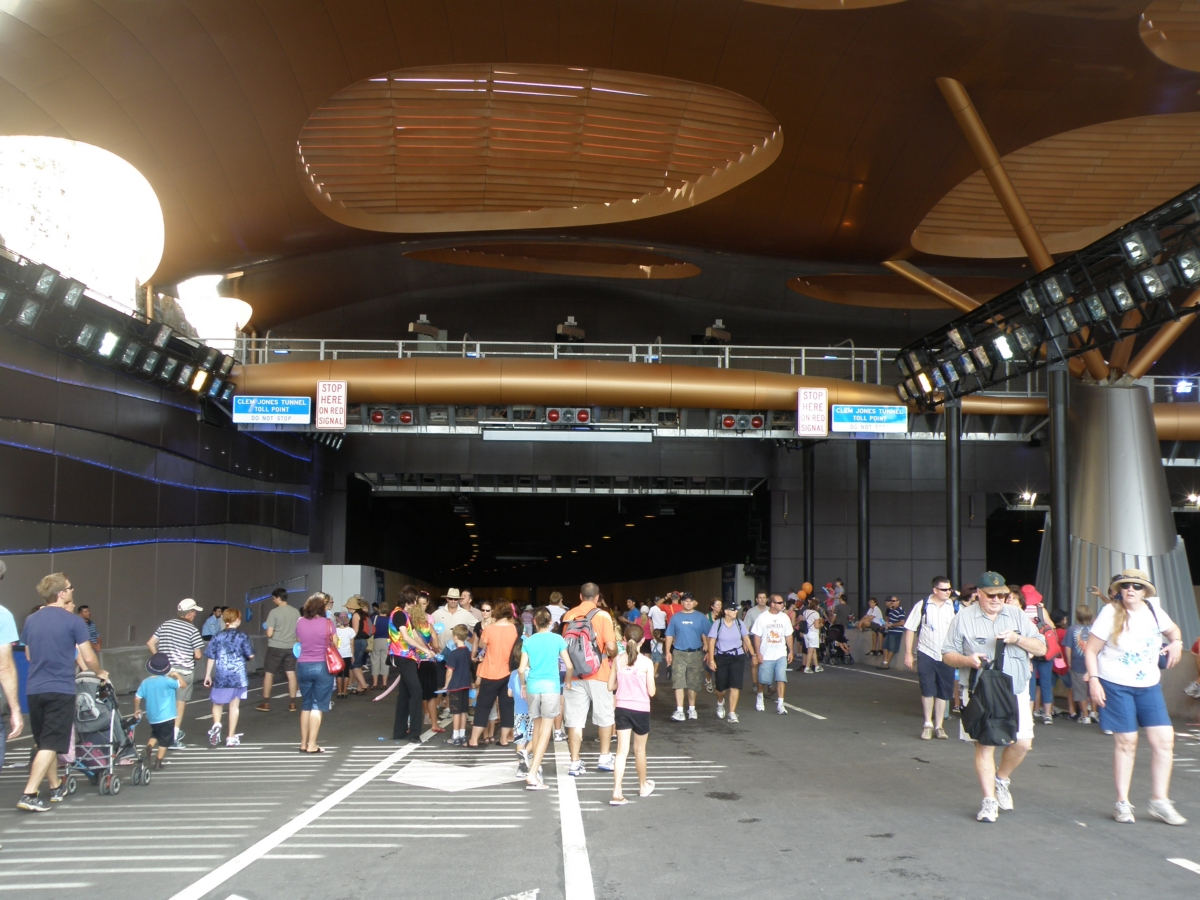
Tunnel entrance at Bowen Hills (Clem7 Community Open Day) with the toll gantry and transitional light filters above

By September 2008, TBM 2 (named Florence) had reached Kangaroo Point on the southern side of the Brisbane River; TBM 1 (named Matilda), which began in March 2008, was still tunneling under the river. By this time bridges had reached the final construction stages at the Northern Portal and the Morrissey Street bridge in Woolloongabba. In early December 2008, Florence had connected to the eastern entrance tunnels from Shafston Avenue. By April 2009 the tunnel excavation was 85% complete. Florence completed tunnelling work on 16 April 2009, while Matilda completed tunneling work on 26 May 2009.

There was some controversy over the environmental hazards that may be caused by construction and operation. In March 2005, local residents protested construction plans primarily due to the expected air pollution from exhaust ventilation stacks. One 43 m (141 ft) purple structure was built in Jurgens Street, Woolloongabba, another 36 m (118 ft) red stack was constructed in O'Connell Terrace, Bowen Hills.

=== CLEM7 Community Open Day ===
The CLEM7 Community Open Day took place on 28 February 2010. It commenced with a 10-kilometre (6.2 mi) long Clem7 Tunnel Run. The electronically timed event was limited to 5,000 participants, and runners ran through the tunnel twice, from Bowen Hills portal to the Woolloongabba portal, and back to Bowen Hills portal. Funds raised support the Royal Children’s Hospital Foundation. Following the run, the public walk through the tunnel attracted 55,000 people.

== Public transport ==
Starting on 22 March 2010, a new bus route 77 runs the tunnel at a cost of $1.6 million, linking Eight Mile Plains and Chermside, completing the 30 km (19 mi) cross-city journey in 39 minutes every 15 minutes at peak times and 30 minutes off-peak.

== Tolls ==
Toll collection is by an electronic tolling system using an e-TAG fitted inside vehicles or by taking a photograph of the registration number, avoiding the need for vehicles to slow or stop. The Linkt (formerly go via) system is used. The toll concession period is 45 years, to 2051.

A toll-free period was in operation until 5 April 2010, followed by five weeks of reduced tolls. Rivercity Motorway claims the toll is the lowest per kilometre of similar tunnels in Australia. An image processing fee of 47 cents is levied on vehicles without an e-tag from 15 September 2010. The tolls are expected to increase on 1 January each year according with Brisbane CPI. These toll rates are as expensive as the Sydney Cross City Tunnel which is Australia's most expensive toll road.

Brisbane Mayor Cr Newman has been criticised over the tolling regime being inconsistent with his promises during the 2004 election. The promises included a tolling duration of 35 years, a toll of no more than $2.00 and a total cost of $1 billion.

Due to lack of patronage, on 28 June 2010 River City Motorways announced reduced tolls of $2.00 per car from 1 July 2010 until 15 November 2010, hoping to increase traffic.

On 1 January 2014, new owners Queensland Motorways increased all tolls. Transurban Queensland now operates the tunnel. Toll prices for the tunnel were then increased every 1 July to be in line with other Brisbane toll roads.

Toll prices as of 1 July 2025
Toll road	Class 1 (Motorcycles)	Class 2 (Cars)	Class 3 (Light Commercial Vehicles)	Class 4 (Heavy Commercial Vehicles)	Toll increase	Toll concessionaire	Expiry of toll concession
CLEM7	$3.25	$6.50	$9.75	$19.49 (Note: Class 4 price shown is the peak hour price (5am–8pm daily). Class 4 off-peak price is $17.21.)	Annually on 1 July, by CPI	Transurban Queensland (Note: Under a long-term concession agreement with the Brisbane City Council) (62.5% owned by Transurban)	August 2051

== Patronage ==
The tunnel was predicted by Rivercity Motorways to carry around 60,000 trips each day. Without a toll an average of 59,000 vehicles used the tunnel and when the reduced toll was payable around 20,000 vehicles used the tunnel. The lower traffic volumes resulted in the toll discount period being extended to 30 June 2010, and again until September. After the poor patronage figures were released Rivercity Motorway shares immediately dropped by one fifth of their value, and have since declined to 0% of their initial value. The peak of 27,000 vehicles was reached on 14 May 2010. A new record of 34,705 vehicles was reached on 13 August 2010. As of February 2012 the average volume is 21,990 vehicles per day, less than 50% of the predicted opening volume. Between June 2011 and June 2012, vehicle traffic decreased by 9% to an average of 24,055 vehicles per day.

The traffic estimates produced for Rivercity Motorway by Maunsell & Partners include a two-year ramp-up period from opening at 60,000 to an annual average daily volume of 100,000 vehicles in 2012. No ramp-up had occurred by March 2011, and the volume of 34,075 peak remains below the minimum opening value estimated by Maunsell. The Maunsell forecast rises to 110,000 vehicles per day in 2014 and 135,000 in 2026. In contrast, traffic estimates produced as part of the Northern Link Supplementary EIS predict an average weekday traffic volume of 70 900 vehicles in 2014 and 92,300 in 2026 if the Northern Link is not built (over 30% less than the Maunsell estimates). If Northern Link is built, these estimates fall to 65,900 in 2014 and 82,000 in 2026 (40% less than the Maunsell estimates). In the most recent Rivercity Motorway Financial Report it was noted that "if traffic assumptions over the entire concession period differed to estimates by +/-5% then the value in use would be impacted by +/-$99 million".

After opening, the tunnel was found to save an average of eight minutes travel time. During the toll-free period, traffic on the Pacific Motorway, Captain Cook Bridge, inner-city bypass, and Story Bridge decreased by over 10%, while traffic on Lutwyche Road increased by over 20%. After the toll was implemented, only the Story Bridge and Inner City Bypass showed a reduction (of around 5%) in traffic compared to before the tunnel was open.

The tunnel saw an average of 29,000 vehicles per day in December 2018, and dropped to 27,000 vehicles per day in December 2019.

== See also ==
- Maureen Hayes
- Road transport in Brisbane
- South East Queensland Infrastructure Plan and Program
- Transport in Brisbane
