= Airport Link, Brisbane =

Motorway in Brisbane, Australia

Coordinates: 27°24′36.76″S 153°03′19.73″E

Airport Link Queensland
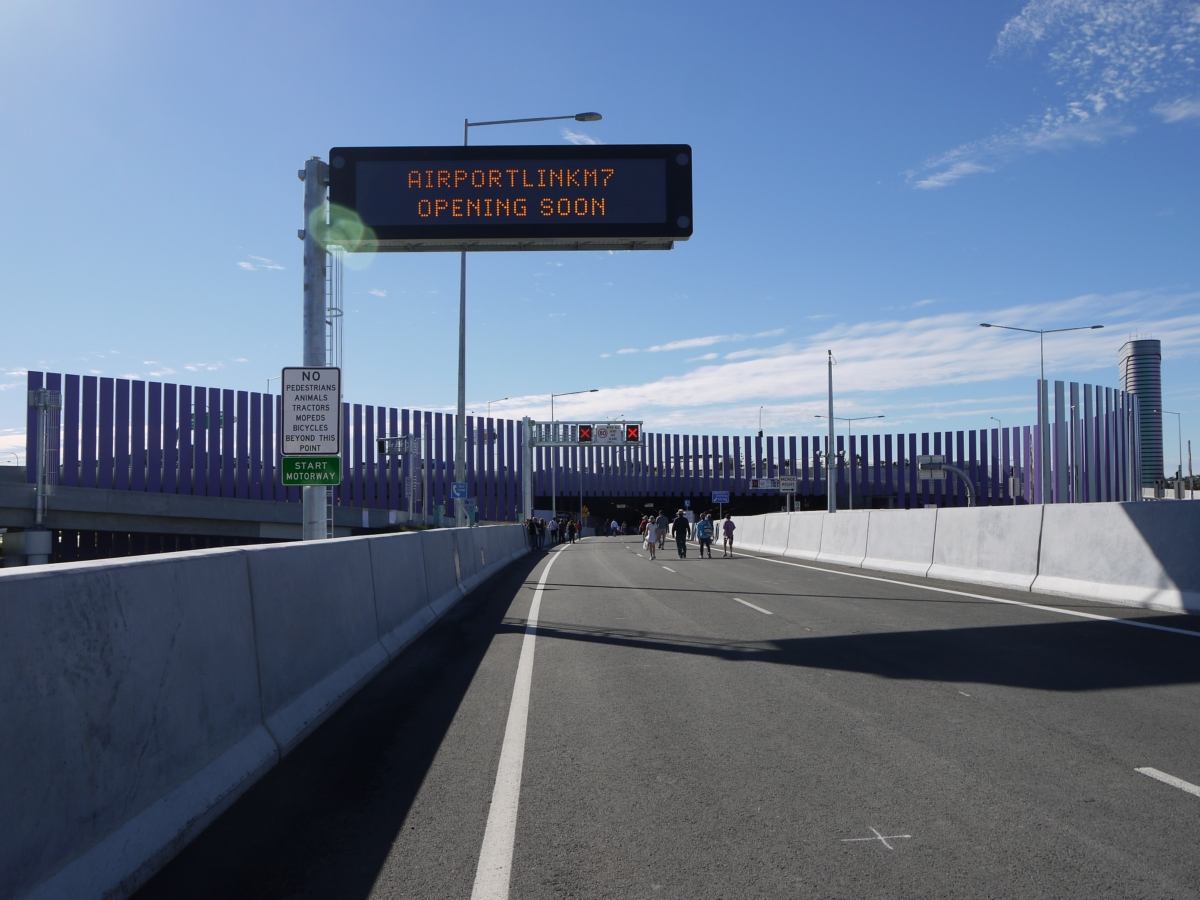
- Heading northbound toward Southern Portal from Fortitude Valley on ramp (Preview Walk)

General information
- Type: Motorway
- Length: 6.7 km (4.2 mi)
- Opened: 24 July 2012

Major junctions
- South end: Inner City Bypass, Clem Jones Tunnel, Bowen Hills
- Gympie Road Stafford Road Windsor
- North-east end: Gateway Motorway East–West Arterial Road Toombul

Location(s)
- Major suburbs / towns: Windsor, Lutwyche, Kedron, Wooloowin

Highway system
- Highways in Australia; National Highway • Freeways in Australia; Highways in Queensland

The Airport Link is a tunnelled, motorway grade, toll road in the northern suburbs of Brisbane, Queensland, Australia. It connects the Brisbane central business district and the Clem Jones Tunnel to the East–West Arterial Road which leads to the Brisbane Airport. It was built in conjunction with the Windsor to Kedron section of the Northern Busway in approximately the same corridor.

The Airport Link and busway project involves 15 kilometres (9.3 mi) of tunnelling including the road (6.7 km of twin tunnels), busway tunnels and connecting ramps, as well as 25 bridges and result in over 7 kilometres (4.3 mi) of new road. The Airport Link was Australia's longest road tunnel until the opening of the M8 in Sydney.

The estimated construction cost of the Airport Link is $4.8 billion. The toll for the full length is $6.38 for a car.

Construction of the Airport Link, Northern Busway and Airport Roundabout Upgrade projects were scheduled for completion in mid-2012. Following a preview walk on 15 July 2012 and final safety approvals, the Airport Link opened to the public at 11.55 pm on 24 July 2012.

== Contract and controversy ==
The contract was awarded to the consortium BrisConnections, composed of Macquarie Group, Thiess and John Holland, beating two other consortia (North Connect and Northern Motorway). BrisConnections was announced as the preferred bidder on 19 May 2008, and the final contract was awarded on 2 June 2008.

Conducted as a public-private partnership (PPP), the financial aspects of the Airport Link project has been mired in controversy from the outset. Macquarie Group charged $110 million in fees for the financial engineering which used the equity from private investors to raise the necessary debt and planned to pay investor distributions from capital, an arrangement which resembles a Ponzi scheme and has been ridiculed as the "dead parrot model", after the famous Monty Python comedy sketch. Former Queensland Premier Anna Bligh enjoyed a free holiday at the Sydney mansion of Thiess director Ros Kelly just before the contract was awarded. Former Labor ministers Terry Mackenroth and Con Sciacca were paid a "success fee", (as government relations advisors) believed to be about $500,000, by BrisConnections after the consortium won the tender.

BrisConnections was listed as a unit trust on the Australian Securities Exchange (ASX) via a $1.2 billion initial public offering (IPO) of installment receipts (or stapled securities) on 31 July 2008 (ASX: BCS). This was the largest IPO in Australia in 2008 and the most disastrous. The value of initial $1 installments fell by 60 per cent on the first day of trading, and by late November had collapsed to 0.1c, the lowest possible price on the ASX. The dramatic price slide was largely due to the leverage risk associated with stapled securities. Among the institutional investors was the Queensland Investment Corporation (QIC), which invested $25 million. The chairman of QIC is Trevor Rowe, who is also the Chairman of BrisConnections and was awarded Member of the Order of Australia in 2004 "for service to the investment banking sector and as a contributor to the formulation of public policy ... and to the community."

It is believed that some of this negative market sentiment was in response to the traffic forecasts contained within the Product Disclosure Statement lodged by BrisConnections. The EIS previously lodged by government showed traffic forecasts in 2012 of 95,000 vehicles per day, rising to 120,000 motorists by 2026. The Product Disclosure Statement prepared by PBA provides forecast of 193,000 vehicles in 2012 rising to 291,000 vehicles by 2026.

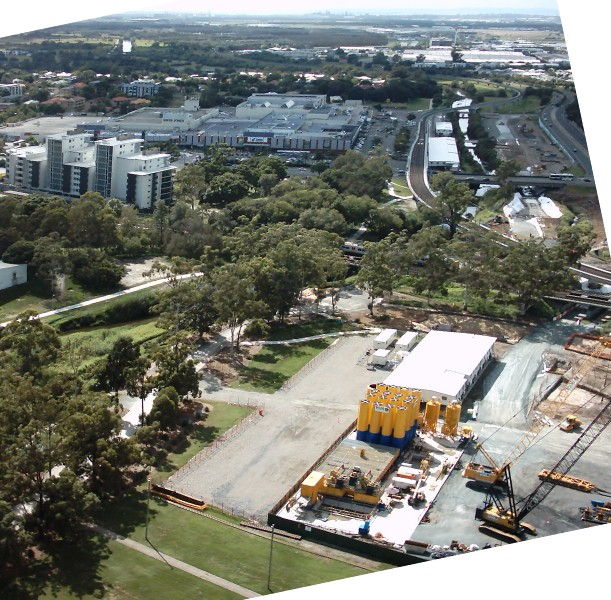
Eastern part of Kalinga Park, during Airport Link work, looking east

During the early period of the BrisConnections listing most of the securities were owned by institutional investors, however as the price collapsed many of these institutions divested their now worthless stock, including Macquarie Group. Most of these shares were taken up by retail investors who were unaware that two further $1 installments on the stapled securities were owing and faced financial ruin as a result. BrisConnections has threatened to sue these investors in order to raise the capital necessary to continue the project, while reducing dividends by 99 per cent. There are no further installments owning which means there are no further obligations on shareholders attached to the units.

While promoting BrisConnections at their media event in April 2009, Premier Anna Bligh denied any responsibility for the fate of the "Mum and Dad" investors saying, "it is not the role of the Queensland Government to underwrite private investment decisions made by people who were seeking to make a profit investing in the stock market". At this time, the Australian Securities & Investments Commission (ASIC) belatedly sought to act on behalf of investors and to seek an independent report of BrisConnections' finances. BrisConnections was nearly wound up in April 2009 after the private company of one investor, Nicholas Bolton, requisitioned a general meeting of members of the managing company. However, on the date of the meeting the proxies attached to Bolton's shares were exercised to against the resolutions, Bolton's company having earlier sold the proxy rights for $4.5 million to Thiess-John Holland Group and the contractor for the Airport Link project. Therefore, the special resolution fell short of the required 75% vote to pass and BrisConnections was allowed to continue operating under its current form.

On 12 May 2009, 70% (278 million) of outstanding shares defaulted on the second $1 instalment payment. Some shareholders transferred their shares off market to false identities, such as Humphrey B. Bear, in order to avoid payment. An auction of shares in default failed to attract a bidder. In June, BrisConnections commenced legal action to recover the unpaid moneys. With Brisconnections launching legal claims against defaulting investors, controversial businessman Jim Byrnes postured as a champion of small investors. The controversy featured prominently in Brisbane newspapers: The name 'BrisConnections' was played upon as a 'con', the project and ensuing farce being dubbed by the media as 'BrisCon'. In October, BrisConnections notified ASX it would stop pursuing defaulting investors.

By early December 2009, the share price of the second $1 installments had collapsed to 0.1c. With little other interest in the "toxic" stock at this time, the chief executive officer, Ray Wilson, paid $10 for 5,000 shares. Two other directors of BrisConnections also purchased share parcels of a similar size, helping to raise the share price to 0.5c by mid-December, however the share price had again collapsed to 0.1c by year's end.

On 13 November 2012, BrisConnections was suspended from trading indefinitely, to pursue talks with lenders. On 19 February 2013, BrisConnections go into voluntary administration owing more than the value of the asset The board called in McGrathNicol as administrators and PPB Advisory as receivers for the $3.5 billion debt owed to a syndicate of banks led by ANZ. Other banks in the syndicate include: BNP Paribas, United Overseas Bank, KBC Finance Ireland, Societe Generale, UniCredit, BOS International, Depfa Bank, DZ Bank, and Allied Irish Banks.

In November 2015, Transurban Queensland (of which Transurban owns 62.5%) announced the acquisition of BrisConnections and AirportlinkM7. The acquisition was finalised in April 2016.

== Construction ==
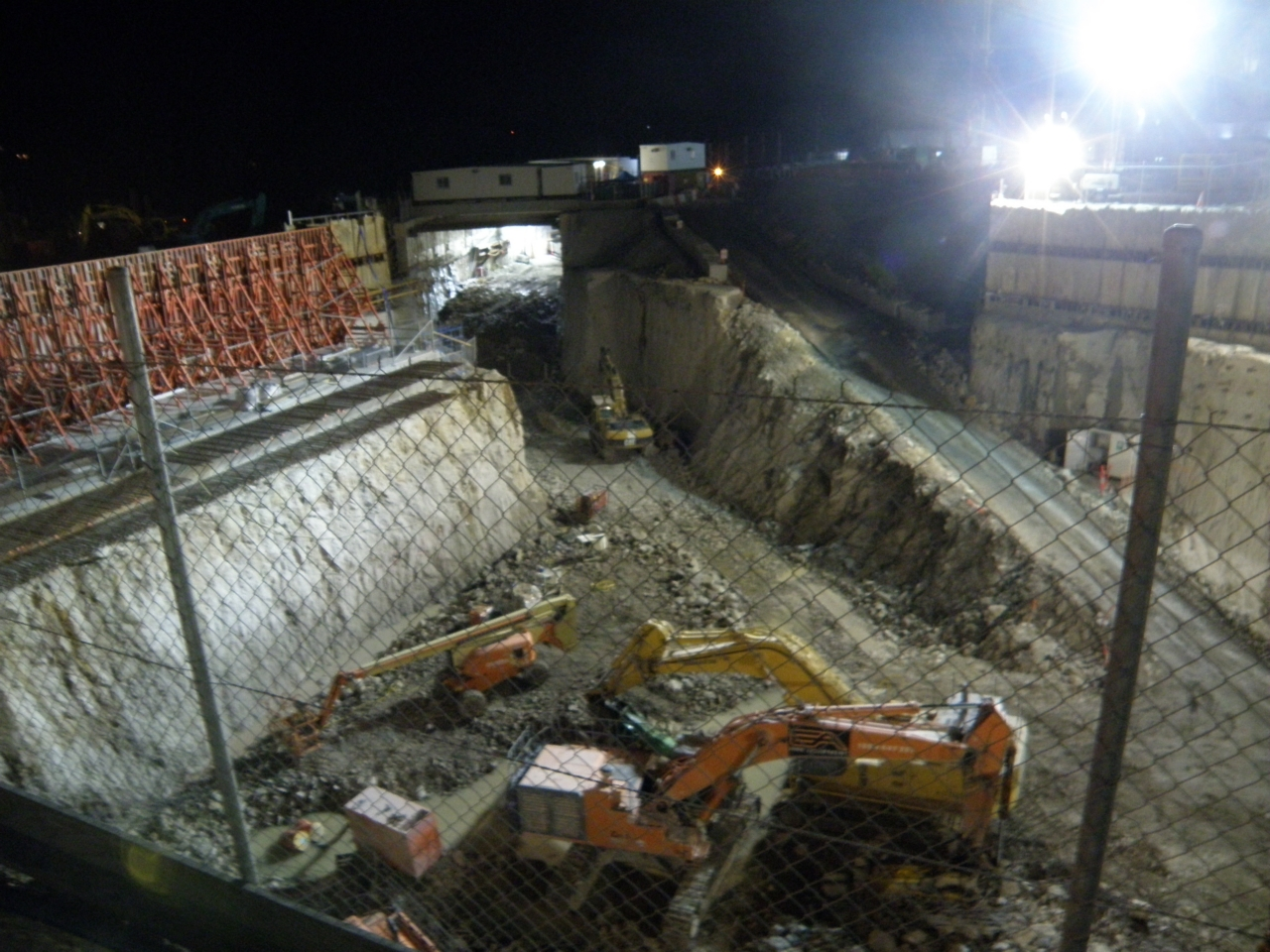
Nighttime tunnelling works at Kedron interchange looking north (March 2009)

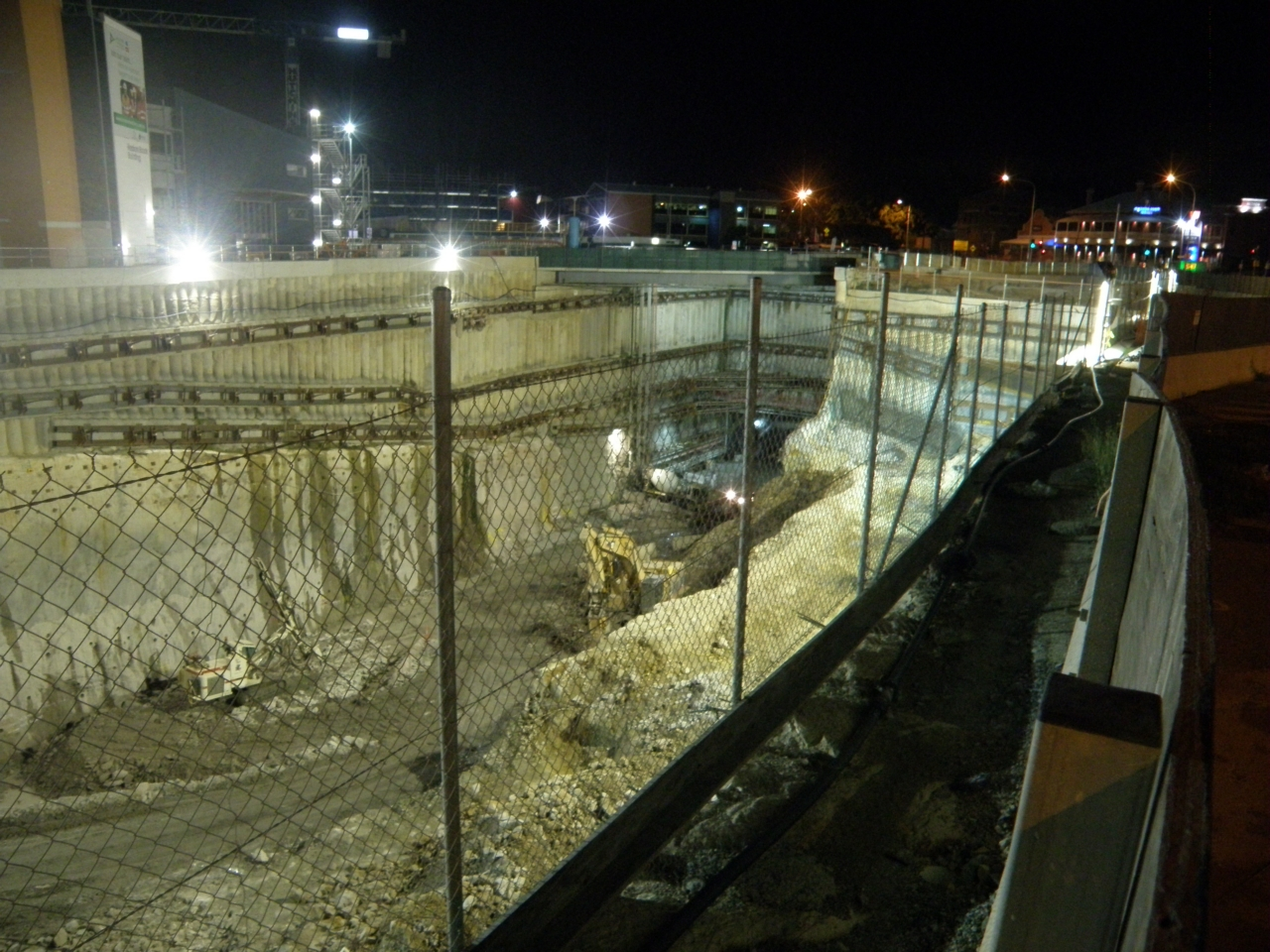
Nighttime tunnelling works at Kedron interchange looking south (March 2009)

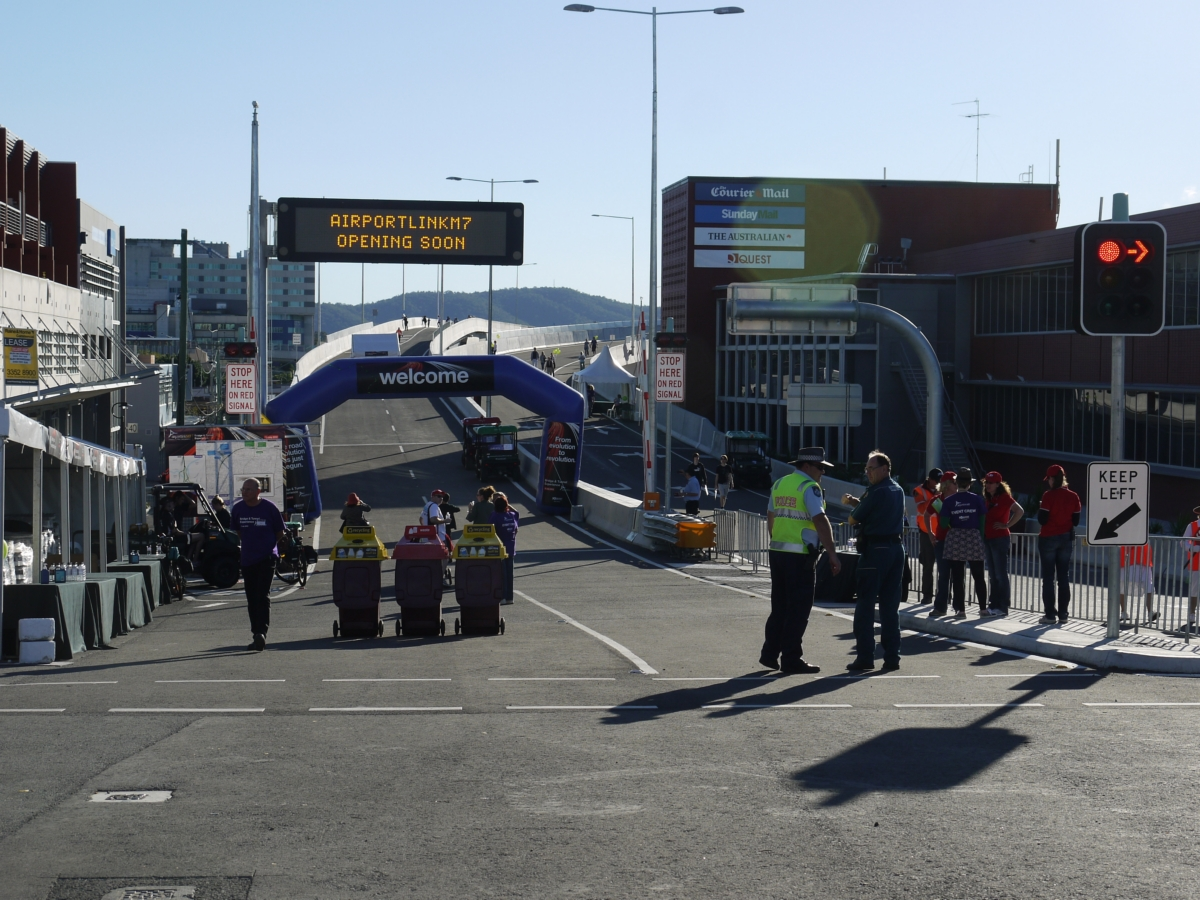
Fortitude Valley On Ramp (preview walk)

The tunnel opened to the public at 11.55 pm on Tuesday, 24 July 2012.

=== Milestones ===
- 19 May 2008 – State government announced BrisConnections as the preferred bidder for Airport Link
- November 2008 – Official start to project construction
- December 2008 – Drill and blast excavation commenced at Bowen Hills, construction of cut and cover structure at Toombul (Kalinga Park) commences
- March 2009 – First roadheader commenced tunnelling at Truro Street site (mid tunnel point) in Windsor
- April 2009 – Roadheader tunnelling commenced at Federation Street site in Bowen Hills
- May 2009 – 24-hour tunnelling operations commence across the project
- June 2009 – Roadheader tunnelling commences in Kedron
- November 2009 – First Tunnel boring machine (TBM) arrives from Germany for assembly
- March 2010 – Completion of both cut and cover structure and Tunnel Boring Machine (TBM) launch box at Toombul, 3.3 kilometres (2.1 mi) of tunnels were already dug and 13 roadheader machines (each 18.2 m in diameter and weigh ) in use on tunnels. In the months that followed this rose to 16 roadheader machines.
- 18 June 2010 – First mined tunnel breakthrough between Bowen Hills and Lutwyche. Transport Minister Rachael Nolan witnessed the occasion.
- Mid 2010 – First TBM commences tunnelling from Toombul while second TBM arrives from Germany
- Mid 2010 – Second TBM commences tunnelling from Toombul heading west toward Lutwyche
- Early 2011 – Northern Busway tunnelling complete
- Early 2011 – TBMs removed from tunnel shaft at Chalk Street in Lutwyche
- Late 2011 – Airport Roundabout Upgrade complete
- 15 July 2012 – Construction complete and public preview walk
- 24 July 2012, 11.55 pm – Airport Link opens to public after final safety certification

=== History ===
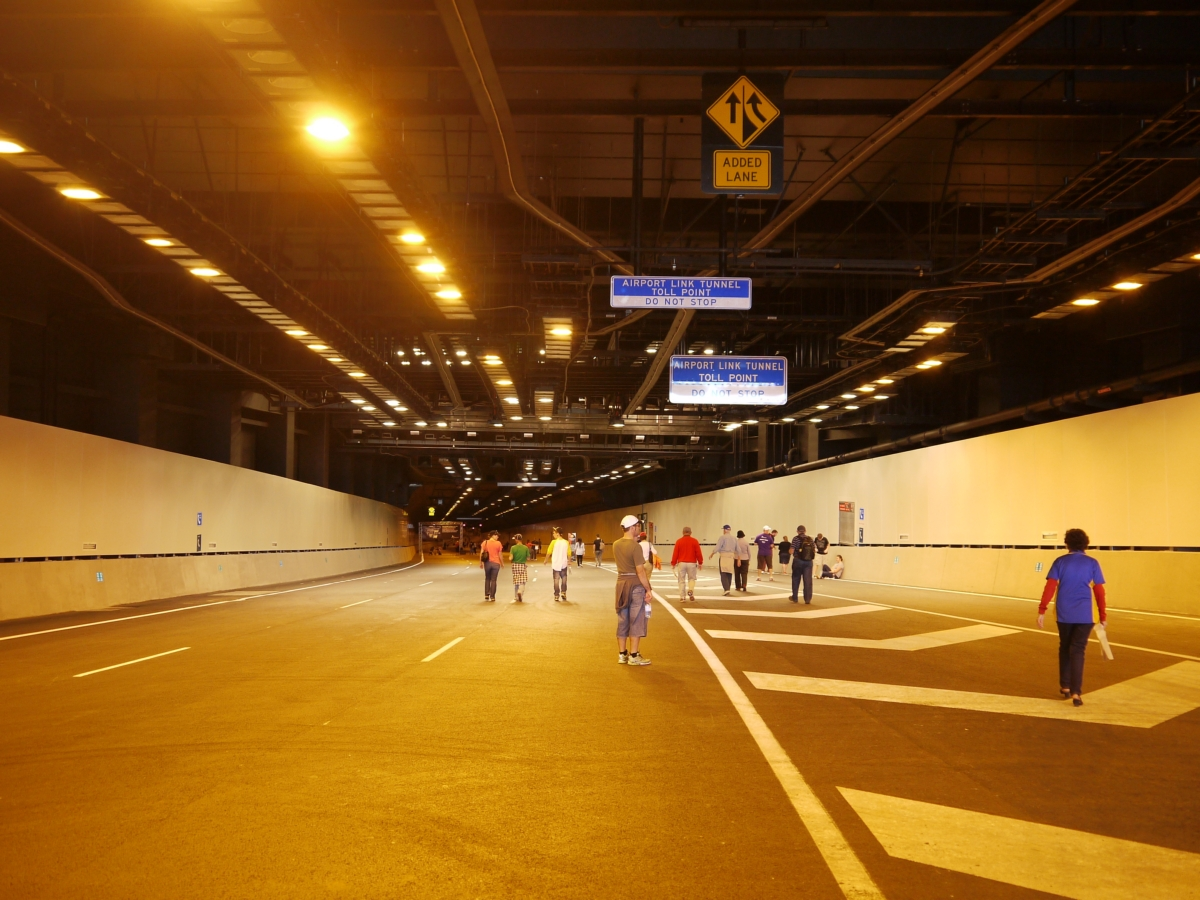
Southern Portal Northbound Toll Gantry

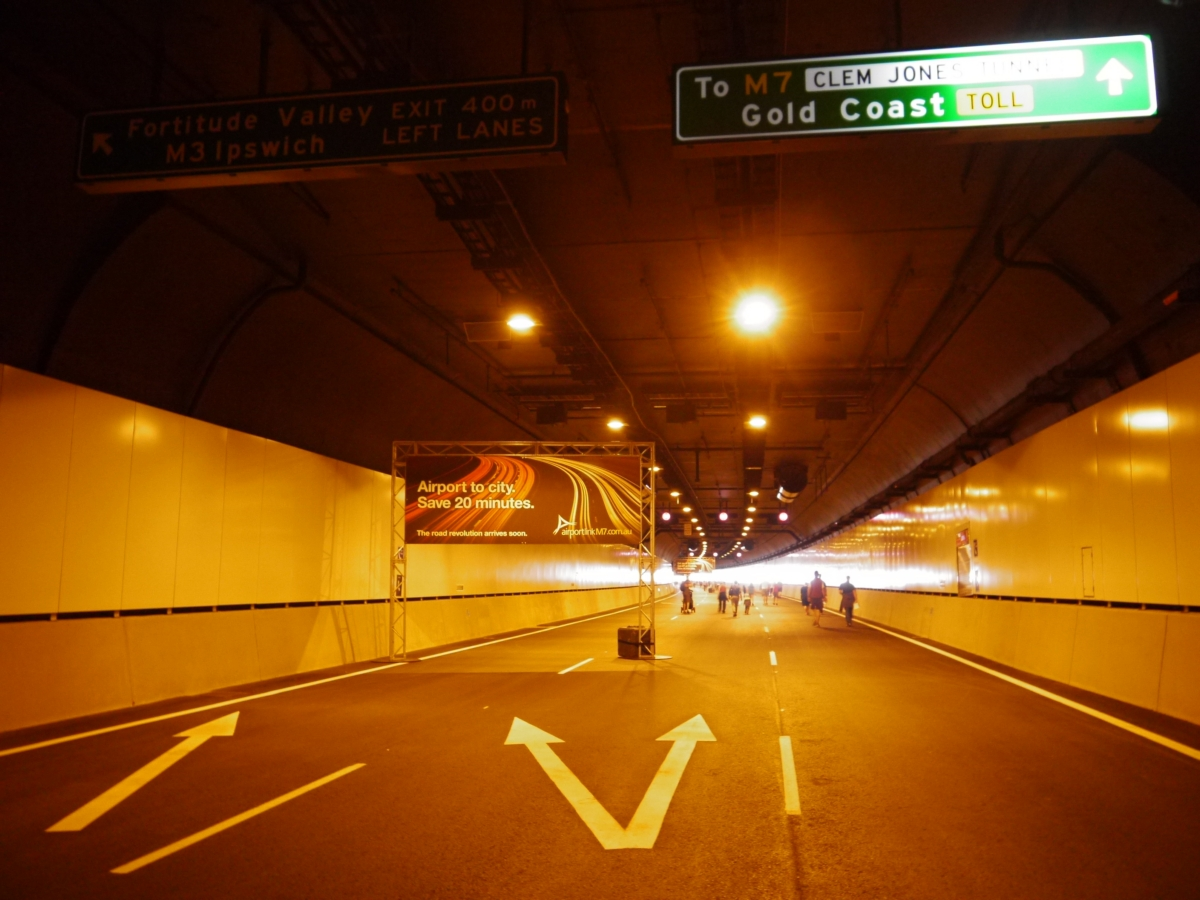
Southbound, Approaching southern portal and exit to Fortitude Valley

On 17 June 2009, CNI requested that the Coordinator-General evaluate a proposed change to the Airport Link project under section 35C of the State Development and Public Works Organisation Act 1971. Due to the discovery during the first half of 2009 of less than favourable ground conditions in the vicinity of the Kedron ramps, BrisConnections proposed the establishment of a new worksite on vacant land at Rose Street, Wooloowin, between Kent and Park Roads to facilitate improved construction access to the mainline tunnels. A shaft 15 metres in diameter and 42 metres deep would be constructed to launch two of the project's ‘roadheader’ excavation machines. It is anticipated that the worksite would be in use for up to 29 months, including backfilling and rehabilitation.

In August 2009 the main earthmoving contractor TF Group went into receivership, owing subcontractors as much as $2.8 million. A group of these subcontractors threatened to blockade the project until their outstanding debts were paid.

On 15 July 2012, the tunnel was opened to registered visitors for a preview walk named the "Bridge and Tunnel Experience".

== Tolls ==
It was estimated the toll charge per trip would be $4.90 for the entire length between Bowen Hills and Toombul, and $3.75 between Kedron and Toombul, when full tolling commenced in November 2013. These tolls were set at $4.00 and $3.00 respectively in 2006 and are being increased in line with Brisbane CPI.

The tolls were phased in between July 2012 and November 2013, with an initial one-month toll free period for all users, a further 2 months toll-free for account holders, then followed by introductory tolls.

The tolls are collected via a 'free-flow tolling system', an electronic tolling system based on overhead gantries reading a tag fitted inside vehicles or by taking a photograph of number plates, avoiding the need for vehicles to slow or stop. Motorcycles do not need a tag and do not incur a number-plate matching fee. The Linkt system is used. Any other Australian toll road tag will work on the Airport Link toll road.

The motorway has 2 sets of gantries, one set at the southern and another at the northern end. Vehicles entering or exiting midway at Kedron to or from Toombul will therefore only pass one gantry and will pay a partial toll. Vehicles passing both sets of gantries are charged the full toll.

Toll prices as of 1 July 2025
Toll road		Class 1 (Motorcycles)	Class 2 (Cars)	Class 3 (Light Commercial Vehicles)	Class 4 (Heavy Commercial Vehicles)	Toll increase	Toll concessionaire	Expiry of toll concession
AirportlinkM7	Bowen Hills to Kedron or Toombul	$3.42	$6.83	$10.25	$18.11	Annually on 1 January, by CPI	Transurban Queensland (Note: Under a long-term concession agreement with the state) (62.5% owned by Transurban)	July 2053
AirportlinkM7	Kedron to Toombul	$2.57	$5.12	$7.69	$13.58	Annually on 1 January, by CPI	Transurban Queensland (62.5% owned by Transurban)	July 2053

== Patronage ==
Traffic forecaster Arup, acting for BrisConnections, had predicted 135,000 vehicles a day will use the road one month after its opening. They forecast that it would climb to 160,000 vehicles per day by July 2015 and 291,000 vehicles per day by 2026. However another forecaster, Veitch Lister Consulting, estimated that traffic would rise to 91,600 vehicles per day by October 2012 but would fall to 70,300 by April 2013 when introductory tolls are introduced and to 53,900 after November 2013 when the full toll becomes effective.

During its first week of operation the tunnel was used by an average 77,320 vehicles each day.

The toll road remained free during its ramp up phase. Average daily patronage for August 2012 was 81,470, with average weekday traffic of 85,862. This has led some analysts to conclude that its days as a publicly listed company are limited. In February 2013, when Airport Link went into receivership, the average daily traffic using the road was 47,802 vehicles.

== Safety ==
Brisconnections, the operator of the tunnel, claim the tunnel is the safest in Australia. A speed limit of 80 km/h along the main tunnel motorway and 60 km/h on exit and entry ramps has been set. Variable message signs 120 metres apart within the tunnel are used to convey important information. Six fixed speed cameras in 10 possible locations are in operation. There are 500 CCTV cameras, which can be viewed on 46 individually controlled monitors in the control room. An underground loudspeaker system is available if needed. Micro-heat detectors are able to measure temperature every six minutes and fire sprinklers that can deliver 600 millimetres an hour of water, are claimed to be able to put out a major fire in minutes. There is a 24-hour control room at Kedron with two operators and a supervisor.

A smoke duct, is present throughout the entire length of the tunnel and 6 ventilation fans (300 hp each) can blow the smoke out of the tunnel with a very quick response time blowing full power.

== See also ==
- Airport Link, Sydney
- Road transport in Brisbane
- South East Queensland Infrastructure Plan and Program
- TransApex
