= Road transport in Brisbane =

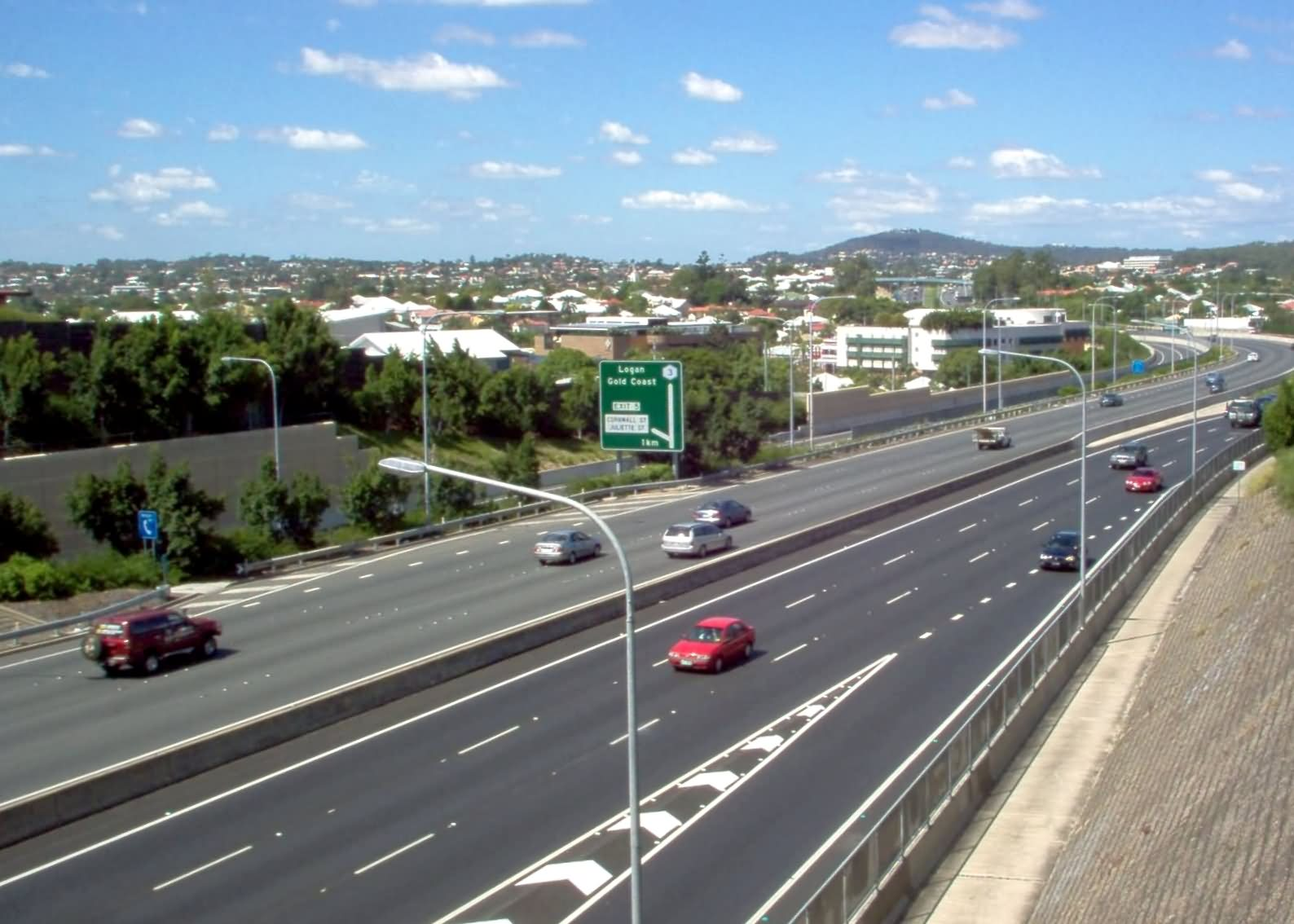
The Pacific Motorway links Brisbane and the Gold Coast (2006)

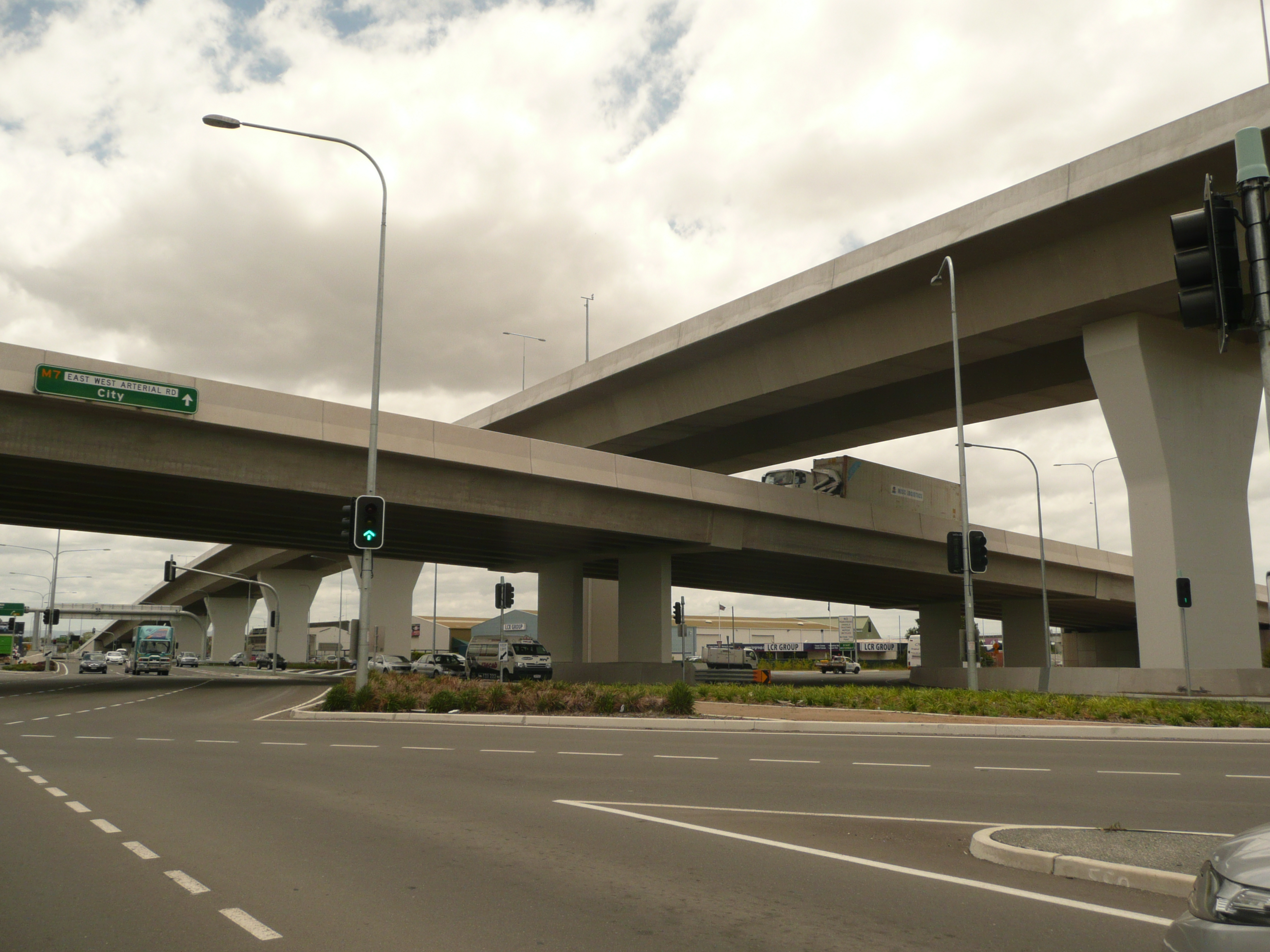
The Airport Flyover alleviated a congestion black spot

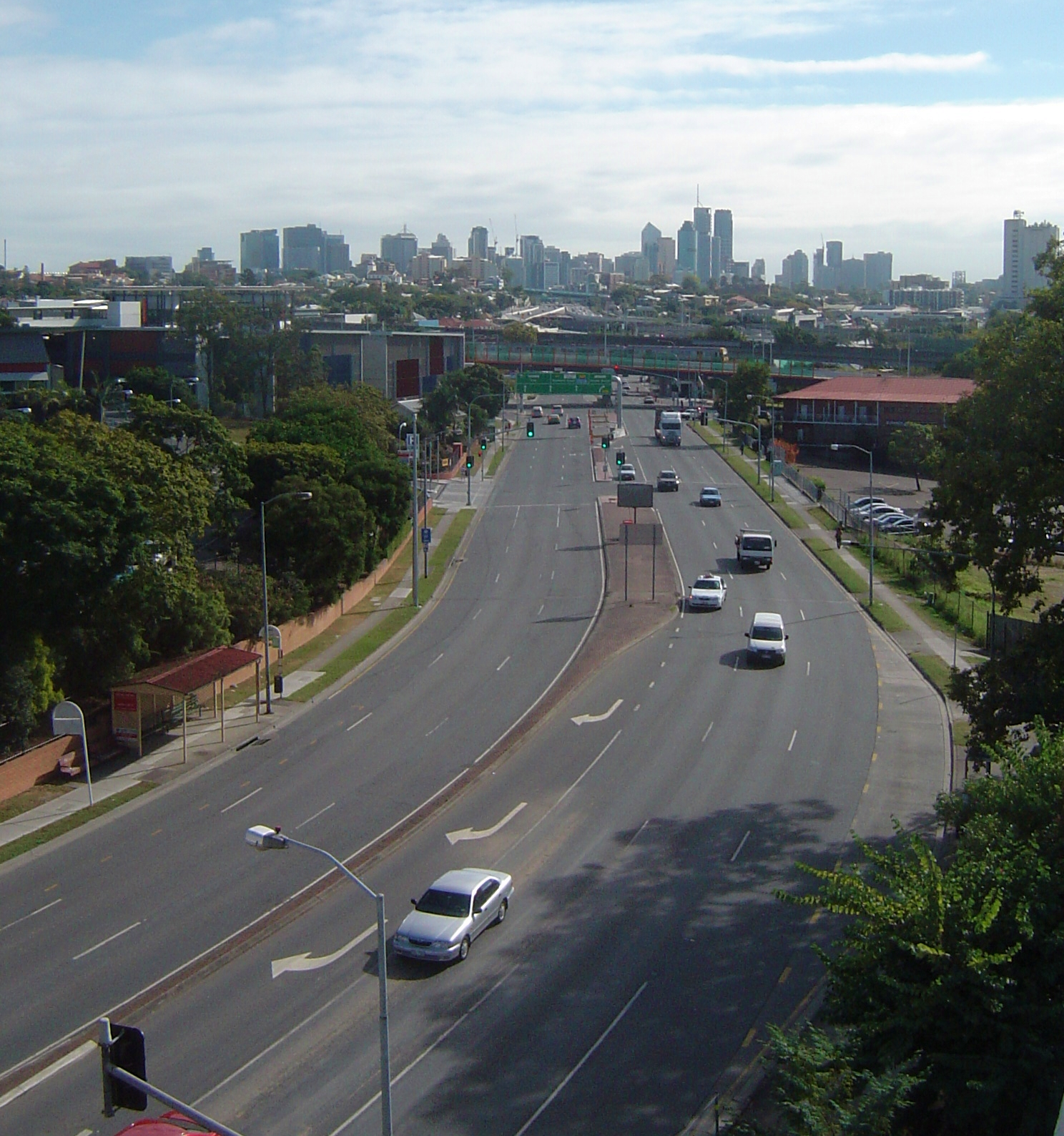
Ipswich Road becomes the Ipswich Motorway and links Brisbane to Ipswich, 2010

The road transport in Brisbane, Australia, consists of a network of highways, freeways and motorways. Some motorways have tolls applied.

Brisbane is a car dependent city. In 2006, within the South East Queensland region, 83% of trips were done by car.

Brisbane is linked with both the Gold Coast and Sunshine Coast by freeway-led suburbanisation.

== Network ==
The Brisbane River has created a barrier to some road transport routes. In total there are nine road bridges and one road tunnel, mostly concentrated in the inner city area. This has intensified the need for transport routes to focus on the inner city. One more cross-river tunnel is planned (East–West Link) as part of the TransApex plan.

Brisbane's road system was planned around large, spacious suburban areas. Dense suburbs now rely on several main road corridors that split through and between these areas and provide the only link to the CBD and other areas of Brisbane. Logan Road, Moggill Road, Old Cleveland Road and Gympie Road are but a few of these multi-lane corridors that come out of the CBD and snake through the suburbs.

Bypasses such as the Inner City Bypass, Airport Link and Clem Jones Tunnel are intended to help to circulate traffic away from the inner-city areas and main roads via limited-access roads above the ground, and tunnels below that have higher speed limits and exits to particular suburbs.

Existing high speed cross-suburban motorways such as the Western Freeway, Centenary Motorway, Pacific Motorway and Gateway Motorway provide alternative routes to main roads and connect up to main highways and other arterial roads. The TransApex plan tunnels, Airport Link tunnel and Clem Jones Tunnel, Legacy Way tunnel and East-West Link tunnel are designed to link all the various motorways in Brisbane together. Only East-West link is yet to commence planning or construction.

In total, the twisting Brisbane River is crossed by nine road bridges, one road tunnel, three railway bridges, three dedicated cyclist/pedestrian bridges and one dedicated bus/cycle/pedestrian bridge. Route signage is achieved by means of a system of Metroads, consisting of the most important arterial roads in metropolitan Brisbane including most motorways, and less important State Routes; however, in recent years, the Metroads are being superseded by an alphanumeric numbering system. Multiple freeways connect Brisbane to other cities, including the Pacific Motorway, the Bruce Highway and the Ipswich Motorway, all of which are part of the National Highway System. Brisbane is approximately 1,000 kilometres (620 mi) away from Sydney, the closest major capital city.

An upgrade to Brisbane's traffic lights system began in April 2011. The old system was called Brisbane Linked Intersection Signal System (BLISS) and required a controller to trigger traffic lights to relieve congestion. The new system called Sydney Coordinated Adaptive Traffic System (SCATS) is used in every other Australian capital city and is expected to cost much less to maintain. All 850 sets of Brisbane City Council signal boxes require upgrades.

Six major roads and bridges in Brisbane are tolled, with all of them using free-flow tolling technology.

The north-west of the city lacks a major roadway. A Brisbane City Council investigation revealed the northside’s urban routes were not designed for the traffic volumes they were experiencing in 2020. Without the development of the North West Transport Corridor rapid population growth north of the city generates traffic congestion and is expected to lead to overcrowding on buses.

== Motorways ==
Brisbane is served by several motorways. The Pacific Motorway connects the central city with the Gold Coast to the south. The Ipswich Motorway connects the city with Ipswich to the west via the southern suburbs, while the Western Freeway and the Centenary Motorway provide a connection between Brisbane's inner-west and the outer south-west, connecting with the Ipswich Motorway south of the Brisbane River. The Bruce Highway is Brisbane's main route north of the city to the rest of the State. The Bruce Highway terminates 1,700 kilometres (1,100 mi) away in Cairns and passes through most major cities along the Queensland coast.

The Gateway Motorway connects the Gold Coast and Sunshine Coasts by providing an alternate eastern route avoiding Brisbane's inner city area, connecting the Bruce Highway to the Pacific Motorway, and by linking to the Logan Motorway (albeit tolled) it forms part of an incomplete ring road. It crosses the Brisbane River over the tolled Sir Leo Hielscher Bridges. The Port of Brisbane Motorway links the Gateway to the Port of Brisbane, while Inner City Bypass and the Riverside Expressway act as the inner ring freeway system to prevent motorists from travelling through the city's congested centre.

| Road Number | Motorway/Highway | Destination |
|---|---|---|
| M3/M1 | Gympie Arterial Road / Bruce Highway | Carseldine (Gympie Road) – Bald Hills (M1 Gateway Gympie Arterial Interchange) – Pine River (Bruce Highway terminus) – Caboolture – Nambour – Cooroy – (Northern Regional Centres) |
| M1/M2 | Gateway Motorway TOLL ROAD (Note: Note that only the Gateway Bridges and the Gateway Motorway from Eight Mile Planes to Drewvale is a toll road) | Drewvale (M2 Gateway Logan Interchange) – Eight Mile Plains (M1 Gateway Pacific Interchange) – Murarrie (Port of Brisbane Motorway Interchange) – Gateway Bridge – Bald Hills (M3 Gateway Gympie Arterial Interchange) |
| M1/M3 | Pacific Motorway | Inner City Bypass – Eight Mile Plains (M1 Gateway Pacific Interchange) – Loganholme (Logan Pacific Interchange) – Helensvale (Gold Coast Interchange) – Tugun Bypass – (NSW) |
| M2/M7 | Ipswich Motorway | Dinmore (Warrego Cunningham Interchange) – Gailes (Ipswich Logan Interchange) – Darra (Centenary Roundabout Interchange) – Rocklea (Granard / Ipswich Roads) |
| M2 | Logan Motorway TOLL ROAD | Gailes (Ipswich Logan Interchange) – Forest Lake (Logan Centenary Interchange) – Greenbank (Logan Lindsay Highway Interchange) – Drewvale (Gateway Logan Interchange) – Loganholme (Logan Pacific Interchange) |
| M5/A5 | Centenary Motorway / Western Freeway | Springfield Lakes – Forest Lake (Logan Centenary Interchange) – Darra (Centenary Roundabout Interchange) – Indooroopilly – Toowong Roundabout (Milton Road) |
| National Route 13 | Mount Lindesay Highway | Moorooka – Greenbank (Logan Lindsay Interchange) – Browns Plains – Jimboomba – Beaudesert – Rathdowney – Woodenbong, NSW (Summerland Way) – Tenterfield, NSW (New England Highway) |
| M3 | Inner City Bypass | Kelvin Grove (Pacific Motorway) – Bowen Hills (CLEM7 Interchange) – Albion (Kingsford Smith Drive) |
| M7 | Clem Jones Tunnel TOLL ROAD | Woolloongabba (Pacific CLEM7 Interchange) – Bowen Hills (Inner City Bypass Interchange) |
| M4 | Port of Brisbane Motorway | Murarrie (Gateway Interchange) – Lytton |
| M7 | Airport Link TOLL ROAD (completed 2011/12) | Bowen Hills (CLEM7/ICB Interchange) – Lutwyche – Toombul |
| M15/A15 | Cunningham Highway | Dinmore (Warrego Cunningham Interchange) – Yamanto – Warwick – (South Western Regional Centres) |
| M2/A2 | Warrego Highway | Dinmore (Warrego Cunningham Interchange) – Brassall (Brisbane Valley Highway Interchange) – Gatton – Toowoomba Bypass – (Western Regional Centres) |
| State Route 26 | Houghton Highway / Deagon Deviation | Clontarf (Redcliffe) – Brighton – Gateway Motorway |
| State Route 85 | D'Aguilar Highway | Caboolture (Bruce Highway Interchange) – Kilcoy – Nanango |

== Route numbering ==
The Brisbane system of road routes is numbered mostly separately to the rest of the state, and the systems on the Gold Coast and Sunshine Coast. The route numbering is basically distributed as so (with a few exceptions):

Routes 1–6, 13 & 15: Major highways and motorways
10, 20, 30, 40 & 50: Orbitals (all incomplete)
21–29, 41–48: Eastern Brisbane
31–39: Western Brisbane
90–99: Southern Brisbane and Gold Coast

Due to the introduction of Metroads in the early 1990s, a few routes around the city are split up. Routes and are examples of routes which were formerly continuous, but have been superseded by Metroads or M routes.

== Management ==
Traffic in Brisbane metropolitan area is managed by the Brisbane Metropolitan Traffic Management Centre. It operates non-stop, provides a phone hotline and a website which provides traffic and travel information.

== Current infrastructure projects ==
- Expansion of Ipswich Motorway
- Kessels and Mains Road intersection at Mount Gravatt

== Driving ==
Brisbane drivers, like all of Queensland, are not permitted to hold a mobile phone while driving, even if it is switched off.

== See also ==
- Bridges over the Brisbane River
- Brisbane Metro
- Busways in Brisbane
- Kenmore Bypass
- List of road routes in Queensland
