= Legacy Way =

Motorway tunnel in Brisbane, Australia

Legacy Way Northern Link Tunnel
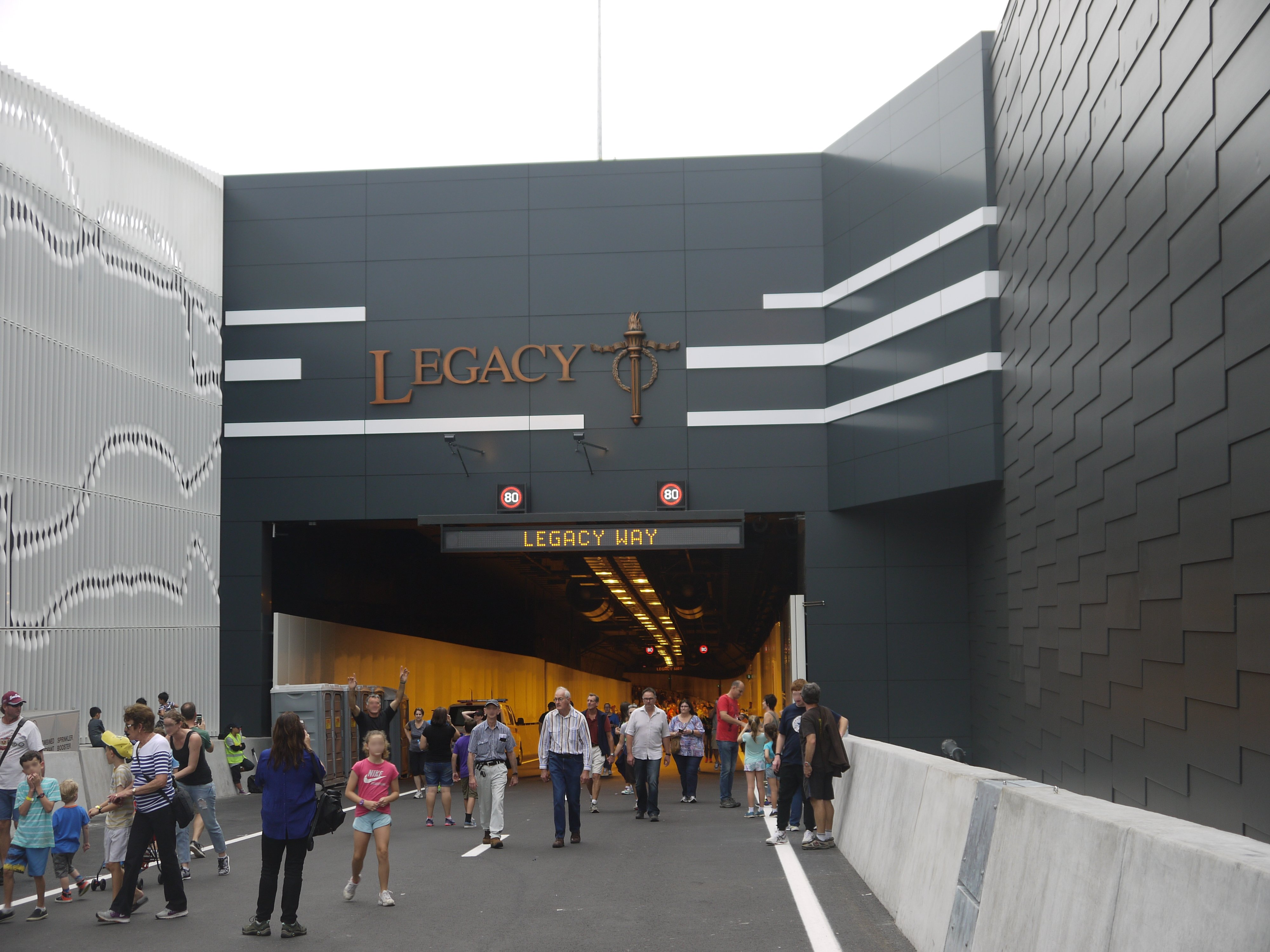
- Eastern Portal of Legacy Way (westbound)
- Interactive map of Legacy Way; Northern Link Tunnel

Overview
- Location: Toowong – Kelvin Grove, Brisbane, Queensland
- Coordinates: 27°27′47.89″S 152°59′54.17″E
- Status: Complete
- Route: M5
- Start: Western Freeway, Toowong, Brisbane
- End: Inner City Bypass, Kelvin Grove, Brisbane

Operation
- Work began: April 2011
- Constructed: Transcity – $1.5 billion
- Opened: 25 June 2015
- Owner: Brisbane City Council
- Operator: Transurban
- Traffic: Automotive
- Character: Motorway
- Toll: $7.00 (car) (2026)
- Vehicles per day: 20,000 (2016)

Technical
- Length: 4.6 km (2.9 mi)
- No. of lanes: 4 total in 2 parallel tubes
- Operating speed: 80 km/h (50 mph)

The M5 Legacy Way (formerly Northern Link Tunnel) is a 4.6 kilometres (2.9 mi) long tunnel linking the Western Freeway at Toowong and the Inner City Bypass at Kelvin Grove, Brisbane. The project consisted of two bored tunnels carrying two motorway grade lanes of traffic in each direction. It opened on 25 June 2015 and is the fourth of five components of Brisbane City Council's TransApex Project. The tunnels will be tolled for approximately 45 years.

The Environmental Impact Statement was released for public comment in September 2008 and approved in April 2010. Construction commenced in April 2011 with original plans to open the tunnel to traffic in late 2014. It carries approximately 20,000 vehicles a day and has reduced travel time between the Centenary Bridge and the Inner City Bypass by 71%.

The project was funded through council borrowings, together with a state and federal government contribution.

== Tender process ==
Three consortia were shortlisted and invited to submit proposals in December 2009:

- Northern Direct (a joint venture of Bouygues, Laing O'Rourke, Transfield Services)
- Transcity (a joint venture of Acciona, BMD, Ghella)
- Leighton Baulderstone Razel joint venture

The tenders for the design, construction, operation and maintenance of the tunnels for up to 20 years were submitted on 12 May 2010, however on 5 July the Brisbane City Council announced that the Leightons Baulderstone Razel joint venture bid would not be considered.

On 20 September 2010, Lord Mayor Campbell Newman announced that the winner of the tender process was Transcity, a joint venture between Acciona, BMD Constructions and tunnelling specialist Ghella.

== Name change ==
In November 2010 the Brisbane City Council revealed that the Northern Link would be named Legacy Way in honour of the men and women serving in the Australian Defence Force. One cent of every toll (equating to $5.5 million over the lifetime of the road) will go to Legacy Australia, an Australian volunteer organisation caring for the families of deceased and incapacitated military veterans.

== Tunnel design ==
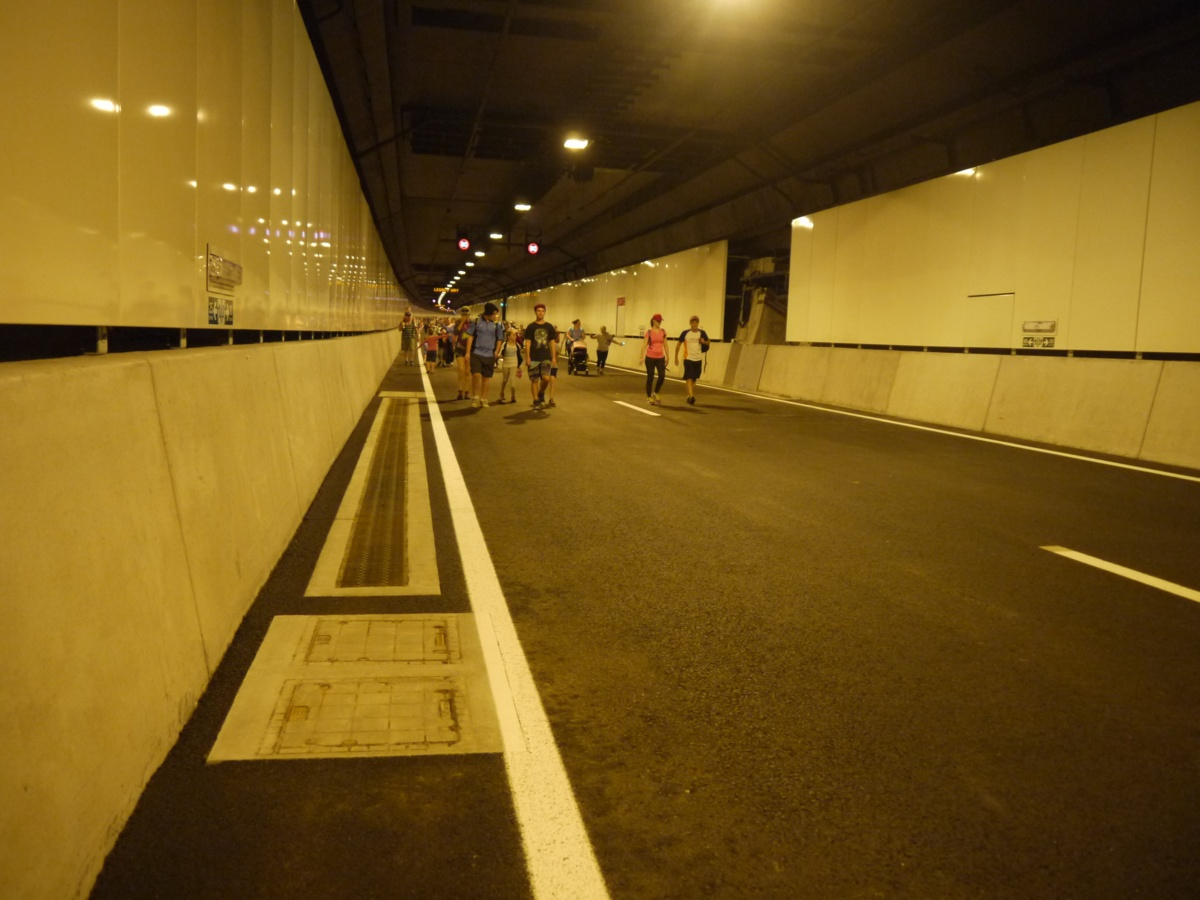
Low point sump, about 40 metres underneath Elizabeth Street, Paddington

=== Features ===
Legacy Way consists of two 4.6 km (2.9 mi) long parallel tunnels that pass from the Western Freeway to Kelvin Grove going through Toowong, Auchenflower, Milton, Paddington, Red Hill and Kelvin Grove. Some design features include 36 underground cross passages, spaced every 120 m, a longitudinal ventilation system, fire protection and safety management systems and free-flow tolling.

==== Alteration ====
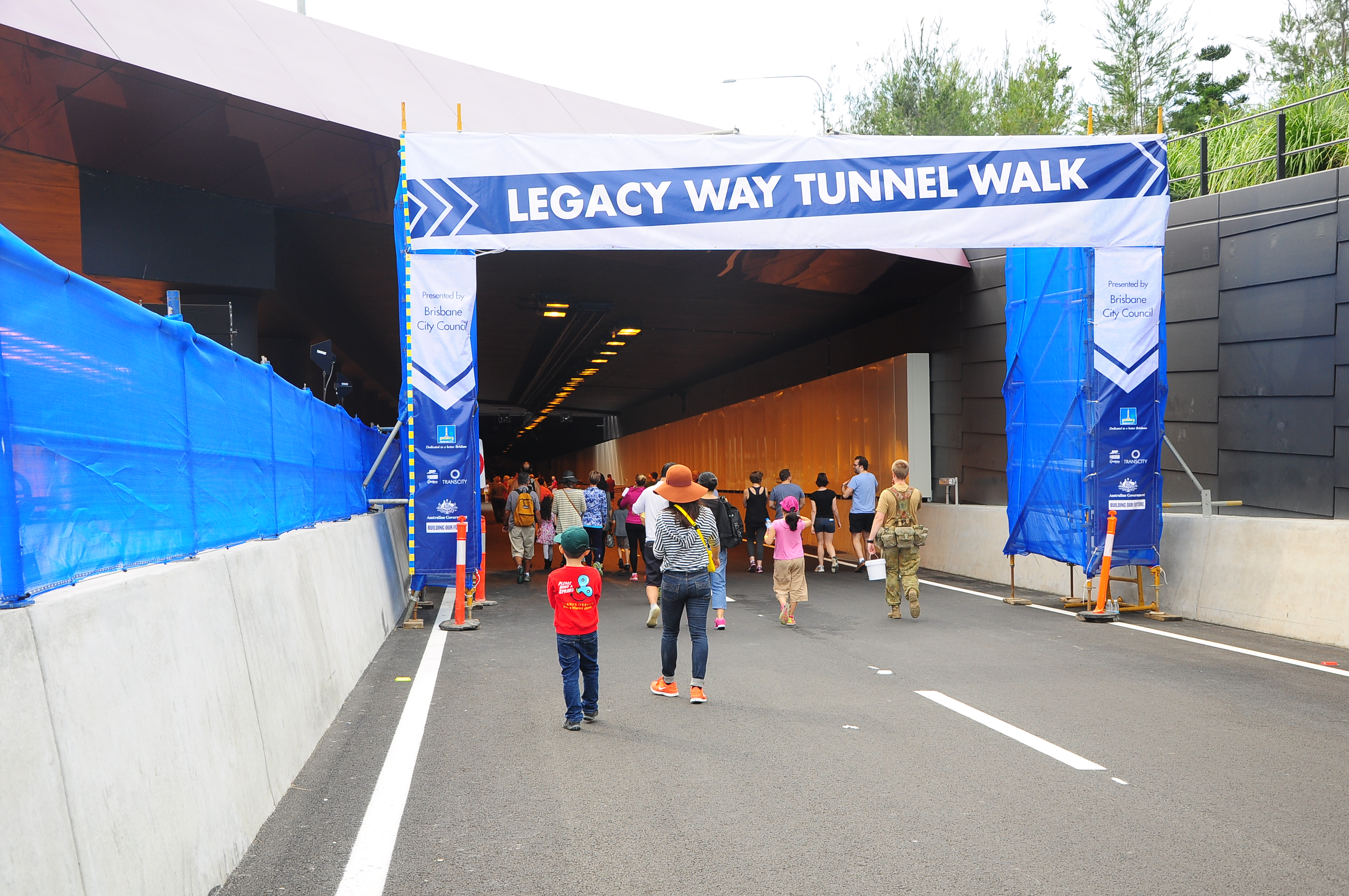
The entrance of Legacy Way, inauguration day

In April 2012 Brisbane City Council Lord Mayor Graham Quirk was quoted as stating that the former Labor state government had failed to support during the design phase of the project a busway connection linking Legacy Way's eastern end with the Northern Busway. Despite a change in state government, the minister responsible for the Department of Transport & Main Roads, Scott Emerson, could not justify a busway connection at a cost of $30 million. Although the inclusion of a busway connection represented only 0.25% of the project's overall cost, the LNP state government were at the time focused on reducing the Queensland government debt.

In November 2013 The Queensland Minister for Transport & Main Roads announced a plan to connect buses from the Underground Bus and Train Tunnel project with Legacy Way.

In April 2014 Queensland Premier Campbell Newman confirmed a plan to shorten the travel time of Transport for Brisbane's western suburbs bus routes by connecting Legacy Way with the Bus and Train (BaT) Tunnel project. By 2020 re-routed bus services will save 15 minutes per journey. Design options involving ramps or bridges linking both tunnels were being considered.

=== Ventilation ===
There are two ventilation shafts. The western shaft is located in the Brisbane Botanic Gardens, Mount Coot-tha with the ventilation station underground. The eastern shaft is located in Victoria Park (which now includes a former golf course) near the Inner City Bypass, Kelvin Grove, and its ventilation station is partially built into an existing hill.

== Construction ==
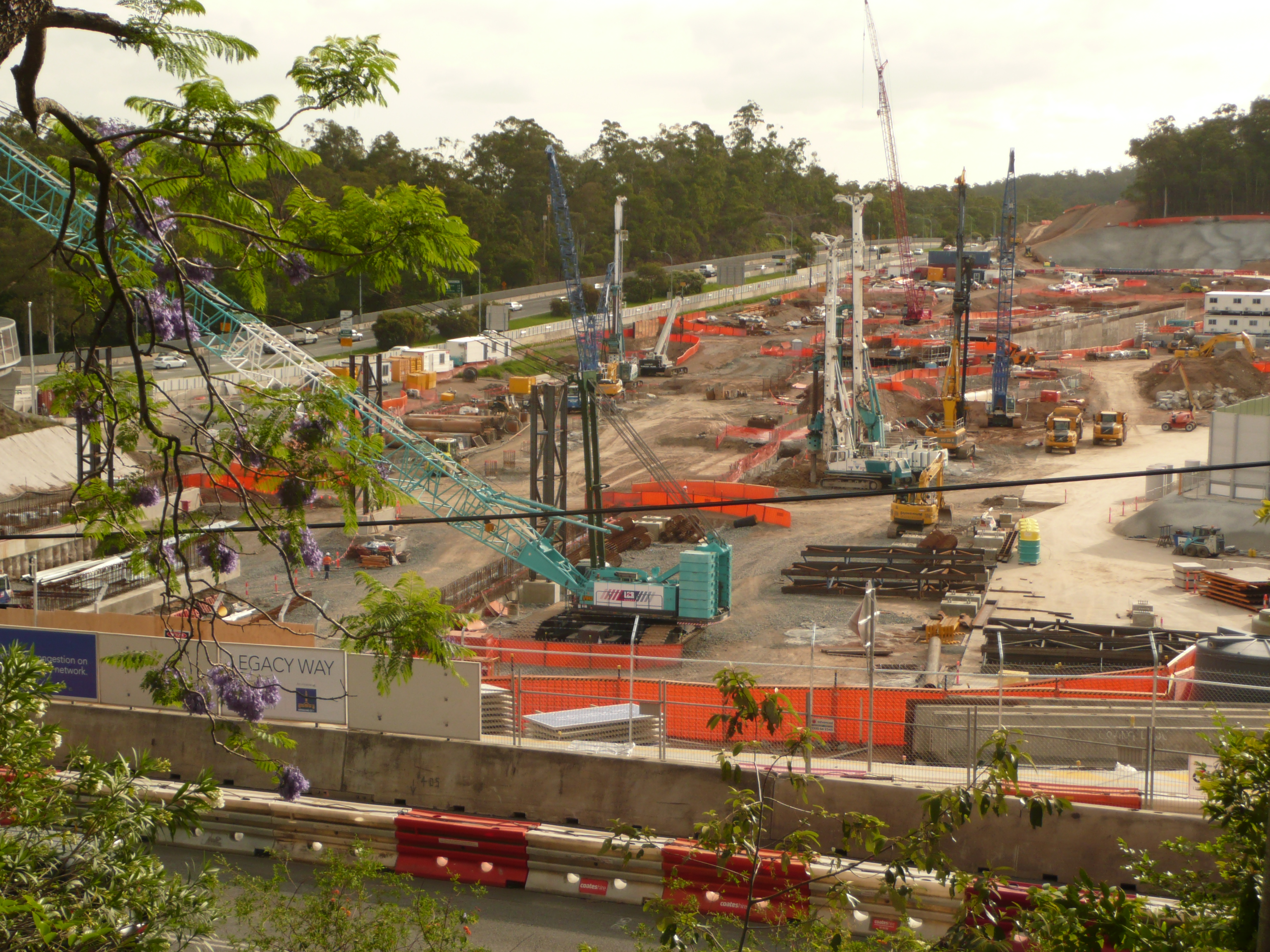
Legacy Way tunnel western entrance construction in November 2011

=== Tunnel boring ===
Two Herrenknecht Double Shield tunnel boring machines (TBMs) bored from the Mount Coot-tha roundabout, Toowong, toward the Inner City Bypass, Kelvin Grove. The TBMs were named Annabell and Joyce, as a tribute to Legacy Australia. Annabell is named after Annabell MacKinney, the daughter of the late Lance Corporal Jared MacKinney who was killed in action in the war in Afghanistan in 2010. Joyce is named after Joyce Tweddell, a nurse during World War II who showed immense courage after being held as a prisoner of war in Sumatra for 3 years before returning home and going on to become Queensland's chief radiographer at the Royal Brisbane and Women's Hospital.

==== Progress ====
Joyce TBM concluded the boring of the eastbound tunnel on 24 April 2013, taking 7 months to reach breakthrough. Annabell TBM concluded boring of the westbound tunnel on 13 June 2013, taking 10 months to reach breakthrough. Both TBMs bored in the same direction.

TBM	Surface Location																					
TBM	Toowong				Auchenflower										Paddington							
TBM	Mount Coot-Tha Rd	Frederick St	Thorpe St	Sleath St	Siemon St	Gregory St	Munro St	Birdwood Tce	Owen Ln	Hume St	Agnes St	Payne St	Annie St	Hope St	Thomas St	Renie St	Howard St	Bass St	Agars St	Baroona Rd	Elizabeth St	Beck St
Annabell	September 2012			October 2012				November 2012							December 2012							
Joyce	October 2012	November 2012				December 2012						January 2013							February/March 2013			

TBM	Surface Location																			
TBM	Paddington													Red Hill				Kelvin Grove		
TBM	Fernberg Rd	Guthrie St	Royal St	Ross St	Ranley Grove	Ranley Tce	Given Tce	Great George St	Bowler St	Charlotte St	Martha St	Plunkett St	Charteris St	Upper Cairns Tce	Cambridge St	Musgrave Rd	Lower Clifton Tce	Kelvin Grove Rd	Normanby Tce	Victoria Park Rd
Annabell	January 2013			February 2013						March/April/May/June 2013										
Joyce	February/March 2013																April 2013			

=== Spoil ===
Spoil created from the excavation earthworks is being deposited at the Mount Coot-tha Quarry. An 870 m long conveyor tunnel transports excavated material from the western tunnel entrance to the quarry.

Spoil Handling
Criterion	Project Impact
Total spoil (bank m3)	1,235,000
Spoil via conveyor to Mount Coot-Tha Quarry (bank m3)	932,000
Disposal site (not disposed of in Mount Coot-Tha Quarry)	Rudd Street, Oxley (or other location as approved)
Haulage route	M5, onto M7, onto Ipswich Road, Darra, onto Douglas Street, Oxley, then Rudd Street, Oxley (or other location as approved).
Spoil by truck (bank m3)	303,000
Haulage hours	Standard construction hours: 6:30am to 6:30pm Monday to Saturday. TBM spoil (in case conveyor is out of operation): 6:30am Monday to 6.30pm Saturday.
Average haulage per hour (in each direction)	Over 14 months: 5 for excess TBM spoil; 35 for TBM spoil when conveyor is out of operation.

Source (p.119)

== Tunnel operator ==
On 16 July 2013 it was reported that Queensland Motorways had acquired a 50-year lease to toll, operate and maintain Legacy Way from Brisbane City Council. The following July, Queensland Motorways was acquired by Transurban.

The majority of the toll revenue will go to Transurban with Brisbane City Council expecting to receive between $1.08 billion and $1.58 billion by 2020.

On 18 September 2013 an informal review conducted by the Australian Competition & Consumer Commission concluded that the acquisition would not result in a substantial lessening of competition in any of the relevant markets.

== Tolls ==
The tunnel is part of the Linkt network (formerly go via), and the toll is collected as vehicles pass under a gantry. The tolls cost for cars at the time of opening in June 2015 is $3.00.

Toll prices as of 1 July 2025
Toll road	Class 1 (Motorcycles)	Class 2 (Cars)	Class 3 (Light Commercial Vehicles)	Class 4 (Heavy Commercial Vehicles)	Toll increase	Toll concessionaire	Expiry of toll concession
Legacy Way	$3.50	$7.00	$10.51	$21.01 (Note: Class 4 price shown is the peak hour price (5am–8pm daily). Class 4 off-peak price is $18.56.)	Annually on 1 July, by CPI	Transurban Queensland (Note: Under a long-term concession agreement with the Brisbane City Council) (62.5% owned by Transurban)	June 2065

== Tunnel walk-through event ==
A family-friendly walk through Legacy Way before it opened to traffic took place on 31 May 2015, when more than 20,000 people, including many young children, passed through the tunnel. The event was only accessible by public transport, with free bus pick-up and drop-off points located throughout the city and multiple bus stops located inside the tunnel.
