= Queensland Motorways =

Australian tollway company

- Type: Public
- Industry: Transport
- Founded: 1980
- Defunct: 2015
- Headquarters: Brisbane, Australia
- Area served: South East Queensland
- Services: Road infrastructure
- Subsidiaries: Port Motorway Company; Logan Motorway Company
- Website: www.qldmotorways.com.au

Queensland Motorways was the company that managed the 70-kilometre-long Linkt (formerly go via) network of tolled roads in Brisbane which includes the: Clem Jones Tunnel (CLEM7), Go Between Bridge, Gateway Motorway (including Sir Leo Hielscher Bridges and the Gateway Extension) and Logan Motorway. It had its headquarters at Eight Mile Plains.

In July 2014, it was acquired by Transurban Queensland, a consortium comprising Transurban, AustralianSuper and Tawreed Investments. It was rebranded Transurban the following year.

== Ownership ==
The company began operating in 1980 as the Gateway Bridge Company.

On 2 June 2009, the Queensland Government announced the 'Renewing Queensland Plan' that would sell assets to raise $15 billion, and avoid a further $12 billion required in future capital investment. Queensland Motorways was included in this process.

In 2011, the Queensland Government transferred ownership of Queensland Motorways to the Queensland Government’s Defined Benefit Fund (a superannuation scheme for Queensland public servants) managed by the Queensland Investment Corporation (QIC). Queensland Motorways now operates under a 40–year Road Franchise Agreement with the state. This meant that tolls on the Logan and Gateway Motorways were extended to 2051. This transfer set out that the Queensland Government would continue to own the road and bridge infrastructure on the Gateway and Logan Motorways, while QIC would own the QML business and the right to toll the motorways. It also limited toll increases to not exceed CPI increases.

In December 2013, Queensland Motorways acquired the rights to manage and toll the CLEM7 tunnel in a $618 million deal with RiverCity Motorway's receivers. On 12 December 2013, QIC announced that Queensland Motorways, with an estimated value of more than $5 billion, would be auctioned off. It was claimed that a change of ownership would not have any impact on existing tolls. Indicative bids would be made by the end of January, and then shortlisted bidders would then be requested to submit binding bids, with the process scheduled for completion in April 2014. On 2 July 2014, a consortium comprising Transurban, AustralianSuper and Tawreed Investments completed financial close on the acquisition of Queensland Motorways for $7 billion. The consortium was later known as Transurban Queensland. The consortium was later known as Transurban Queensland.

In late January 2015, the Queensland Motorways corporate brand was replaced by the Transurban brand and logo.

== Tolling system ==
Queensland Motorways launched its toll payment brand, go via (now known as Linkt) in 2009 to support the introduction of a non-stop, electronic tolling system on its toll road network and on other Australian toll roads.

Vehicles are detected as they travel through a toll point and tolled in two ways. Firstly, with an in-vehicle tag device. Alternatively with video sensors identify the vehicle and registration plate number as it passes through a toll point. Motorists have three days to pay their tolls. If tolls are not paid within that time, offending motorists will receive toll notices, which will include an administration fee, in addition to the toll charge. If payment is still not made upon receipt of the toll notice, a motorist may be issued with a Penalty Infringement Notice.

== See also ==
- Road transport in Brisbane
