= Transurban =

Australian road operator company

Transurban Limited
- Type: Public
- Traded as: ASX: TCL
- Industry: Infrastructure, development and road operations
- Founded: 14 March 1996; 30 years ago in Melbourne, Australia
- Headquarters: Melbourne, Australia
- Area served: Australia; Canada; United States
- Key people: Michelle Jablko (CEO)
- Products: Road infrastructure; Land development; Transport operations; Toll road operations
- Brands: Linkt (Australia); Express Lanes (United States); A25 (Canada)
- Number of employees: 4000+
- Website: transurban.com

Transurban is an Australian, multinational road operations company and one of the world's largest toll road operators. Transurban, either independently or through financial consortiums, manages and develops urban toll road networks across Australia, Canada and the United States. It is listed on the Australian Securities Exchange (ASX).

Transurban is the full owner of CityLink in Melbourne, which connects three of the city's major freeways. When Transurban was founded in March 1996, it was only limited to the operation of CityLink, under a 'single purpose' restriction. However, in September 2001, an agreement was reached with the Victoria State Government on a corporate restructure to allow Transurban to undertake other activities outside of CityLink and pursue new business. Since then, Transurban has grown and currently has stakes in six tolled motorways in Sydney and six tolled motorways in Brisbane. Linkt is Transurban's e-TAG toll brand and can be used in all toll roads in Australia. In the United States, Transurban has ownership interests in the 495 Express Lanes on a section of the Capital Beltway around Washington, DC. It also has an interest in the connecting 95 Express Lanes project on Interstate 95. In Canada, Transurban holds an interest in the A25 Motorway.

Transurban was included on the Dow Jones Sustainability Index (DJSI) World List from 2006 to 2010 and on the DJSI Asia Pacific List from 2011 to 2015.

== Roads and projects ==
Transurban has an interest in 16 urban motorways in Australia, Canada and the United States.

=== Australia ===
==== Melbourne ====
- CityLink (100% shareholder and manager)

The CityLink contract was awarded in 1995 by the Victorian Government to a consortium of Australia's Transfield Holdings and Japan's Obayashi Corporation, named Transurban Consortium. Transurban was formed on 14 March 1996 to operate the CityLink contract and collect tolls.

==== Sydney ====
- M2 Hills Motorway (100% shareholder and manager)
- Lane Cove Tunnel (100% shareholder and manager)
- Eastern Distributor (75.1% shareholder and manager)
- M5 South-West (100% shareholder and manager)
- Westlink M7 (50% shareholder)
- Cross City Tunnel (100% shareholder and manager)
- WestConnex (50% shareholder and manager)
  - New M4 and M4 East
  - M5 East
  - M8 Motorway
- NorthConnex (50% shareholder)

Transurban first entered the Sydney market by owning 40% of WSO Co. Pty Limited, which in February 2003, entered into a concession to operate the Westlink M7. Between 2004 and 2005, Transurban fully acquired Hills Motorway Group (M2 Hills Motorway) from various shareholders including Abigroup and Macquarie Infrastructure Group (MIG).

In April 2007, Transurban acquired Sydney Roads Group from MIG which included the ownership of Interlink Roads (M5 South West, 50%), StateWide Roads (M4 Western Motorway, 50.6%) and Airport Motorway Limited (Eastern Distributor, 71.35%). Transurban increased its shareholding in M7 to 50% between 2006 and August 2008.

Transurban acquired the Lane Cove Tunnel from Connector Motorways in May 2010 and Cross City Tunnel in June 2014. Since then, Transurban increased its shareholding in Eastern Distributor and fully acquired Interlink Roads/M5 South West.

==== Queensland ====
Transurban has a 62.5% share in Transurban Queensland, which operates the Queensland toll road network. The other 37.5% stake in the Transurban Queensland consortium is divided between AustralianSuper (25.0%) and Tawreed Investments (12.5%). The consortium was set up in 2014 to acquire Queensland Motorways, which operated the Gateway Motorway, Logan Motorway, Go Between Bridge, Clem Jones Tunnel (CLEM7) and the then under-construction Legacy Way. It also inherited the go via tolling system used by Queensland Motorways, which has since been rebranded to Linkt in May 2018. In November 2015, Transurban Queensland announced the acquisition of BrisConnections and AirportlinkM7, which had been in voluntary administration since February 2013. The acquisition was finalised in April 2016.

Within Brisbane (which excludes the Toowoomba Bypass), the Transurban Queensland network (previously go via network) consists of 75 kilometres (47 mi) of toll roads. The Transurban Queensland network now comprises:

- Gateway Motorway (including Sir Leo Hielscher Bridges)
- Logan Motorway
- Clem Jones Tunnel
- Go Between Bridge
- Legacy Way
- Airport Link
- Inner City Bypass (operation and maintenance only, road remains toll-free)
- Toowoomba Bypass (tolls only)

=== Canada ===
==== Quebec ====
- A25 Motorway (100% shareholder and manager)

=== United States ===
==== Virginia ====
- 95 Express Lanes – HOT Lanes in Northern Virginia (50% shareholder and manager)
- 395 Express Lanes – HOT Lanes in Northern Virginia, which extends northern the end of our 95 Express Lanes to the Washington DC border. (50% shareholder and manager)
- 495 Express Lanes – HOT Lanes in Northern Virginia (50% shareholder and manager)

== See also ==
- Electronic toll collection
