= South East Queensland Infrastructure Plan and Program =

The South East Queensland Infrastructure Plan and Program 2010–2031 (SEQIPP) is produced by the Queensland Department of Infrastructure and Planning and outlines estimated infrastructure investment across South East Queensland Australia to 2031. It represents a long-term commitment to infrastructure delivery in South East Queensland. In mid-2011, then Premier Anna Bligh announced the plan would be incorporated into a statewide infrastructure plan called the Queensland Infrastructure Plan.

SEQIPP was first released in 2005 and is updated annually. It sets timeframes and budgets to ensure infrastructure is delivered to support the region’s growth.

In 2010, the plan identifies about $134 billion in estimated infrastructure investment, which is expected to support about 930,000 jobs through to 2031:

- $97.7 billion in transport
- $6.8 billion in health
- $3 billion in education and training
- $5.4 billion energy
- $1.5 billion in water
- $3.8 billion in community services
- $16 billion in completed projects.

An average of $37,000 per person in SEQ is estimated to be invested in infrastructure across South East Queensland to 2031.

In 2011, SEQIPP will become a statewide document, the Queensland Infrastructure Plan, which will clearly link infrastructure delivery with population growth and economic development priorities.

It will also be realigned to more effectively link to Queensland Growth Management Summit outcomes including regionalisation and feedback from local governments on dwelling targets.

Delivery of SEQIPP is a clear demonstration of Growth Management Queensland (GMQ) delivering outcomes for Queenslanders.

== Projects ==
Major road project that have been completed include the Tugun Bypass, Clem Jones Tunnel, Gateway Motorway Upgrade and the Hale Street Link. Work on the Airport Link was completed in 2012. Public transport projects covered by the plan include the Northern Busway, Boggo Road Busway and the Eastern Busway. Track duplication between Corinda railway station and Darra railway station has been completed.

The Western Corridor Recycled Water Project and Southern Regional Water Pipeline were two water projects identified in the plan. The Traveston Crossing Dam was part of the plan, however the Federal Government rejected the project on environmental grounds.

== See also ==
- South East Queensland Regional Plan
- TransApex
