= TransApex =

Road project in Brisbane, Australia

TransApex was a road transport plan devised by Brisbane Lord Mayor Campbell Newman in the early 2000s to connect existing motorways and major arterial roads with new transport links and divert cross-city traffic out of the Brisbane central business district. The plan is currently being delivered by Brisbane City Council at an estimated total cost of over $10 billion across five stages. According to the Brisbane City Council website, TransApex is "the biggest urban road project proposed in Australia".

== Background ==
Brisbane is well known for its significant long-term population growth, and this growth combined with the city's proximity to the high growth areas of the Gold Coast and the Sunshine Coast puts major pressure on the road and public transport network, with peak hour congestion on parts of the Brisbane road network. Despite the visible impacts of the high growth on the road network, road infrastructure and public transport in south-east Queensland has failed to keep up with the resulting increase in vehicular demand. Brisbane's road network operates essentially as a 'hub', with the city's major roads feeding directly into the CBD. In 2004, when TransApex was first proposed, there was only one corridor that traffic could use to bypass the city centre (the Gateway Bridge), which lies 8 kilometres (5.0 mi) to the east of the CBD.

== Original plan ==
=== Labor proposal ===
During the tenure of former Lord Mayor Jim Soorley, Labor had investigated a number of tunnels throughout Brisbane, including the future Clem Jones Tunnel and Airport Link, though none had progressed past feasibility studies by the time of the 2004 election.

=== Liberal proposal ===
As the Liberal lord mayoral candidate in the 2004 Brisbane local government election, Campbell Newman proposed a transport infrastructure plan which would "revolutionise cross-town travel for motorists and provide for the creation of cross-suburban bus routes for public transport patrons... while its resultant free-flowing road network will mean shorter trips, reduced fuel consumption and decreased vehicle emissions." Newman's original proposal was a system of five tunnels to be constructed in two stages:

Stage One (2004–2013, $3.2 billion)

1. The East/West Distributor: a 5.8 kilometres (3.6 mi) four-lane tunnel (including a river tunnel) linking Logan Road and Old Cleveland Road at Stones Corner, the South East Freeway and Ipswich Road at Woolloongabba and the Western Freeway at Toowong (now East-West Link)
2. The North/South Distributor: a 5.7 kilometres (3.5 mi), four-lane tunnel running under Main Street and the Story Bridge, linking Ipswich Road, the South East Freeway, Logan Road and Old Cleveland Road with Bowen Bridge Road and the Inner City Bypass at Bowen Hills (now Clem Jones Tunnel)
3. The Northern Link: a 3.6 kilometres (2.2 mi), four-lane tunnel connecting the Western Freeway with the Hale Street Inner City Bypass route. This tunnel will also serve as a link between the East/West Distributor and the North/South Distributor, completing Brisbane's first inner ring road system (now Legacy Way)
4. The Hale Street/South Brisbane Connection: a 600-metre, four-lane tunnel linking Hale Street with Merivale and Cordelia Streets at South Brisbane. This tunnel represents a pre-emptive move against an expected growth in traffic in the area caused by the West End Urban Renewal Program (now Go Between Bridge)

Stage Two (2014–2018, $800 million)

1. The Kingsford Smith Drive Duplication: a 3.9 kilometres (2.4 mi) tunnel linking the Inner City Bypass at the Breakfast Creek Hotel with the new alignment of the Gateway Arterial Road. This tunnel ensures that each of the city's main arterial roads is directly connected to the inner ring road system (now split into two distinct projects: Airport Link and Kingsford-Smith Drive widening)

The two stages of TransApex were proposed to be funded by a combination of a toll of $2 (including GST) per segment link and contributions from Federal, State and Local governments.

== Current structure ==
The final implementation strategy of the plan is significantly different from what was originally proposed, and now consists of four tunnels and one bridge linking various parts of the city. The Kingsford Smith Drive Tunnel is likely to be abandoned and replaced by two projects – a tunnel linking the end of the North South Bypass Tunnel to the Brisbane Airport (part of the Airport Link project) and a staged surface upgrade of Kingsford Smith Drive.

The five projects (in chronological order of project commencement) are:

- Clem Jones Tunnel (CLEM7)
- Airport Link
- Go Between Bridge (formerly Hale Street Link)
- Legacy Way (formerly Northern Link)
- East-West Link

Construction of the Clem Jones Tunnel, Legacy Way, Go Between Bridge and Airport Link has been completed, construction is currently underway on Stage 1 of the Kingsford Smith Drive upgrade. Discussions are still underway regarding the East-West Link and Stages 2 and 3 of the Kingsford Smith Drive upgrade and as of June 2011 firm construction dates for these projects have not been announced.

== TransApex projects ==
=== Clem Jones Tunnel (North South Bypass Tunnel) ===
This tunnel was the largest project in the original TransApex proposal, and commenced construction in 2006 after the Royal Queensland Show in August. It links Woolloongabba to Bowen Hills via Kangaroo Point under the Story Bridge.

This project was delivered as a Public Private Partnership (PPP) by the RiverCity Motorway consortium at a final cost of $3.2 billion. The tunnel was opened on 18 March 2010, with traffic able to use the tunnel toll-free for 3 weeks due to its early opening. When the $3.95 toll was instated, poor initial patronage forced the operators to reduce the toll to $2 to encourage usage. The toll has since returned to its original value of $3.95.

=== Airport Link ===
This project was not part of the original TransApex proposal, and was first proposed by Soorley as Stages 2 and 3 of the North-South Bypass Tunnel. The tunnel originates at the northern end of the Clem Jones Tunnel at Bowen Hills and links the CBD to the Brisbane Airport via Kedron.

For ease of construction, this tunnel was built in conjunction with the Northern Busway project and the Airport Roundabout Upgrade project. Airport Link was constructed by the Brisconnections consortium of Macquarie Group, Thiess and John Holland and also used the PPP model. Construction costs for the project were estimated to be $4.8 billion and the toll is expected to be $4.90 per trip when full tolling commences in November 2013. The Airport Link project is the largest road infrastructure project in Australia and is the most expensive of the TransApex projects.

=== Go Between Bridge ===
Although originally proposed as a tunnel, a feasibility study favoured a bridge for economic and engineering reasons. It connects the western end of the Inner City Bypass with Merivale and Cordelia Streets in South Brisbane to the west of the existing William Jolly Bridge.

The bridge was constructed by the Hale Street Link Alliance at a final cost of $338 million. As of 1 July 2011 the toll will be $2.35 (adjusted for CPI), which is the lowest of all the TransApex projects.

=== Legacy Way ===
This tunnel links the Western Freeway at the Toowong roundabout to the Inner City Bypass near Victoria Park golf course. The Transcity joint venture commenced construction in April 2011 and the project was finished in mid-2015 at an estimated cost of $1.8 billion, including over $1 billion borrowed from the State Government and $500 million of federal funding. The toll was set at $3 for the first year after opening and as of April 2020, the toll is $5.19 per trip.

=== East-West Link ===
This tunnel is proposed to link the Western Freeway at the Toowong roundabout to the Pacific Motorway at Buranda. It is currently expected to commence sometime around 2026 but may be brought forward depending on the findings of a review currently underway by Brisbane City Council. The project does not appear in the Queensland State Government South East Queensland Infrastructure Plan and Program running to 2031.

As of June 2011 the proposed delivery model and toll and construction costs for the project have not been released.

== Controversy ==
Despite the TransApex projects being a significant factor behind Newman's 2004 election victory, the initial support has been largely negated by community backlash and financial concerns regarding the projects' long term viability.

=== Financial ===
Australian tunnel operators have a poor financial track record, with Connector Motorways (Lane Cove Tunnel, Sydney) and Cross City Motorway (Cross City Tunnel, Sydney) both going into receivership. Of the TransApex tunnels, Rivercity Motorways went into receivership in February 2011 and BrisConnections in January 2012. Speculated causes for the financial difficulties include underestimated costs and overestimated revenue; the Clem Jones Tunnel was originally budgeted at $2 billion. Prior to the finish of construction, Airport Link constructors Leighton Holdings forecast a pre-tax loss of $430 million on the project.

=== Tolls ===
The current toll prices are all higher than the $2 per link proposed in the initial plan, and none of the remaining projects are likely to have tolls below this figure. Research has shown that tolling new infrastructure can actually discourage people from using it, keeping volumes high on the congested surface roads.

=== Usage ===
Actual traffic volumes on the Clem7 have been as low as a third of forecast volumes.

=== Community ===
A number of complaints about the project were lodged including those related to construction noise, dust, vibration and parking.

Community action groups such as the Rivermouth Action Group (Clem Jones Tunnel), West End Community Organisation (Go Between Bridge) and SOS4031 (Airport Link) provide forums for local residents and businesses to have an influence on construction related activities and decisions.
