= Inner City Bypass, Brisbane =

Motorway in Brisbane, Australia

Inner City Bypass Queensland
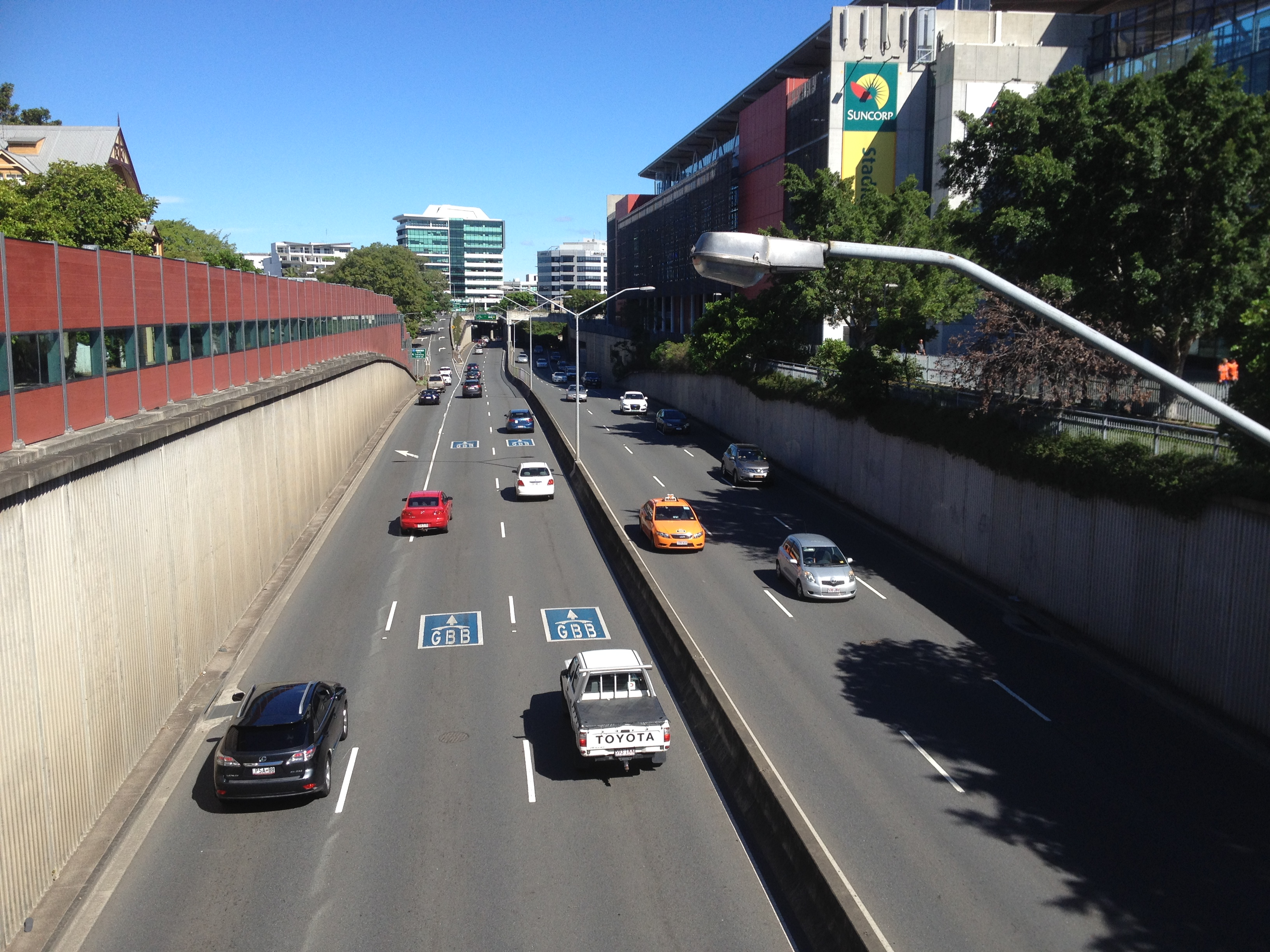
- Inner City Bypass in Brisbane
- Coordinates: 27°27′11″S 153°01′28″E

General information
- Type: Highway
- Length: 5.6 km (3.5 mi)
- Route number(s): M3; Brisbane–Bowen Hills

Major junctions
- North end: Albion
- South end: Brisbane

Location(s)
- Major suburbs: Bowen Hills

Highway system
- Highways in Australia; National Highway • Freeways in Australia; Highways in Queensland

The M3 Inner City Bypass (ICB) is a 5.6-kilometre (3.5 mi) major motorway standard bypass in Brisbane, Queensland, Australia. Bypassing the Brisbane central business district to the north, it connects Brisbane's Pacific Motorway and Go Between Bridge at Hale Street to Kingsford Smith Drive, Legacy Way Tunnel, Clem Jones Tunnel, AirportLink Tunnel and Lutwyche Road following the Exhibition railway line for the majority of its length.

The route is mark as the M3 from the western part of the route, to the Horace Street interchange.

The motorway cost $220m to complete and incorporates a total of six lanes, four tunnels, 18 bridges and was the largest infrastructure engineering project undertaken in Queensland for decades. The route also includes a 350-metre-long (1,150 ft) tunnel under the RNA Showgrounds.

The ICB, built by the Brisbane City Council, is considered one of the most successful road projects in Brisbane, completed well before schedule, on budget, and to date is one of the most used road corridors in the city.

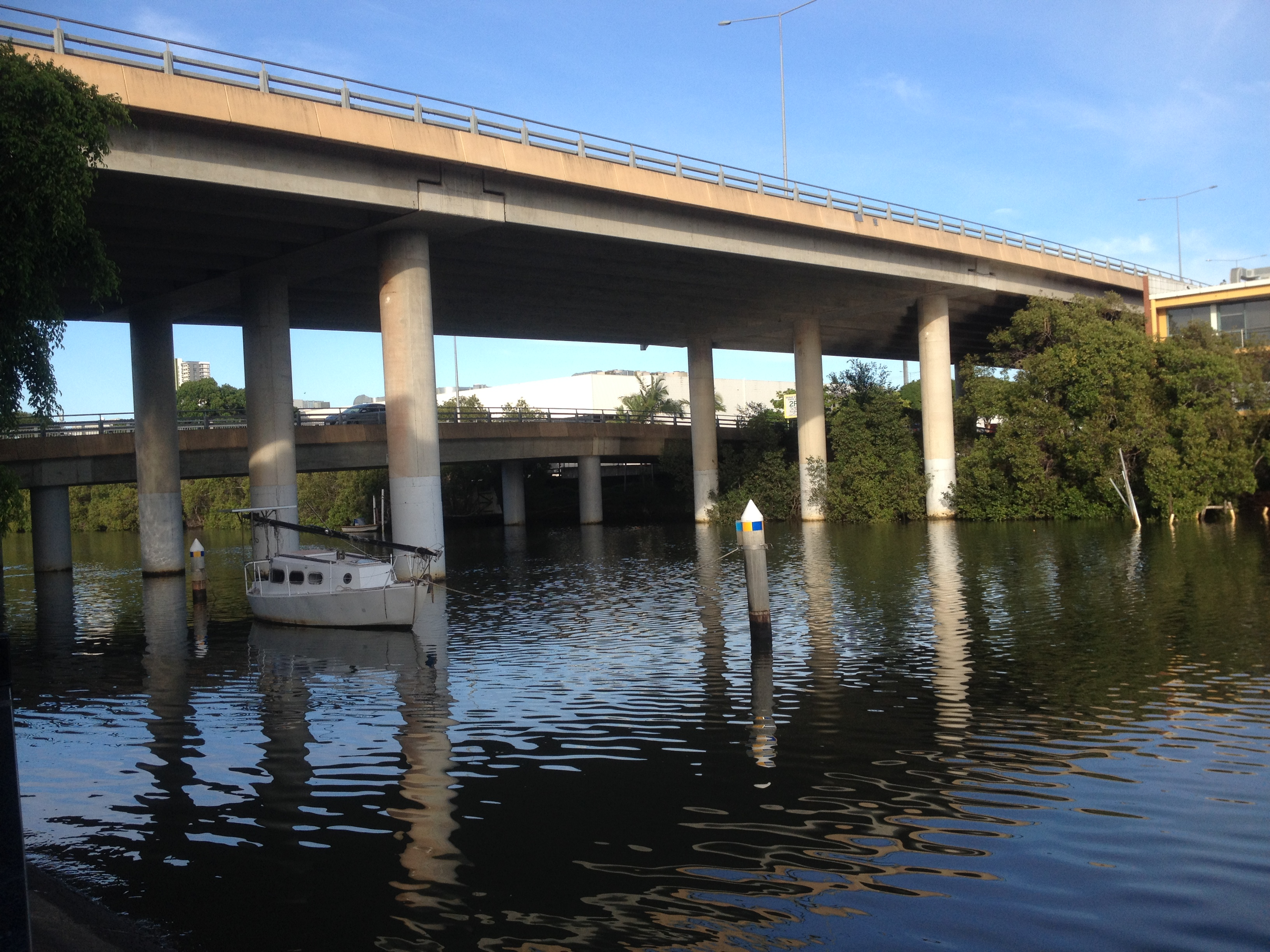
ICB viaduct over the Breakfast Creek

== Construction ==
The ICB was laid in vacant land or connected pre-existing streets in Brisbane.

The Inner City Bypass was built in 3 stages:

- Stage 1 – Hale Street to Campbell Street which opened during November 2001
- Stage 2 – Campbell Street to Abbotsford Road which opened during February 2002
- Stage 3 – Abbotsford Road to Kingsford Smith Drive which opened during July 2002

The Hale Street link to Coronation Drive was widened in 1994 along Boomerang Street, at a site which would later form the entrance to the ICB and the connection to the Go Between Bridge. This site was previously occupied by the Arnott's Biscuit Factory and adjoining carpark, which were controversially demolished. Hale Street originally ran only between Milton Road and Musgrave Road. The ICB was built along vacant land, rail yards and playing fields. Gilchrist Avenue in Victoria Park previously extended to and joined Kelvin Grove Road, before being removed to make way for the ICB.

An upgrade to increase the capacity of ICB was completed in 2018. This included widening each direction to four lanes and a new westbound on-ramp from Bowen Bridge Road. The upgrade was funded and delivered by Transurban Queensland on behalf of Brisbane City Council. Following completion of the upgrade, Transurban Queensland manages the operations, maintenance and incident response along the ICB until 2065, while the road remains toll-free. Transurban Queensland also does routine maintenance services on a 10 + 10-year contract.

== Exits and interchanges ==
The road is within the local government area of the City of Brisbane.

Location	km	mi	Destinations	Notes
Inner City Bypass (Hale Street) turns east on Coronation Drive for Pacific Motorway toward Brisbane, Logan and Gold Coast, west on Coronation Drive for Toowong, or continues south across the Go Between Bridge for South Brisbane.
Milton	0.2	0.12	Milton Road – Brisbane, Toowong, Ipswich	No northbound exit to Brisbane
Milton	0.6	0.37	Caxton Street – Paddington	Northbound entrance and southbound exit
Paddington	1.2	0.75	Musgrave Road – to Kelvin Grove Road northbound	No southbound exit
Kelvin Grove	1.3	0.81	Kelvin Grove Road – Brisbane	Northbound and southbound entrance
Kelvin Grove	1.6	0.99	Kelvin Grove Road – Brisbane	Southbound exit only
Kelvin Grove	1.6	0.99	Victoria Park Road – Kelvin Grove	Northbound left-in/left out only
Herston	2.0	1.2	Legacy Way	Northbound entrance and southbound exit
Herston	2.9	1.8	Gilchrist Avenue – Kelvin Grove, Royal Brisbane and Women's Hospital, Victoria Park Golf Course	Northbound exit only.
Spring Hill	2.9	1.8	Bowen Bridge Road; Inner Northern Busway	Southbound entrance only from Bowen Bridge Road northbound
Bowen Hills	3.1	1.9	RNA tunnel western end	
Bowen Hills	3.5	2.2	RNA tunnel eastern end	
Bowen Hills	3.6	2.2	Lutwyche Road; Airport Link Tunnel – Sunshine Coast, Brisbane Airport	
Bowen Hills	3.8	2.4	Clem Jones Tunnel – Gold Coast	
Bowen Hills	4.7	2.9	Abbotsford Road – Brisbane	Northbound exit and southbound entrance
Albion	5.3	3.3	Sandgate Road – Sandgate	Southbound exit and northbound entrance
Albion	5.6	3.5	Breakfast Creek Road – Fortitude Valley, Brisbane, Royal Brisbane and Women's Hospital	
Inner City Bypass becomes Kingsford Smith Drive.
1.000 mi = 1.609 km; 1.000 km = 0.621 mi: Incomplete access; Route transition

== Interconnectivity ==
Although not constructed as part of the TransApex project, the ICB plays an integral part in the connection of tunnels and other urban motorways within Brisbane's inner city. As a part of this, the Inner City Bypass has been connected to the Airport Link and the Legacy Way tolled tunnels.

The Airport Link was completed in mid-2012 and the Legacy Way in late June 2015.

== See also ==
- Freeways in Australia
- Freeways in Brisbane
