= RiverCity Motorway =

Defunct Queensland tollway company

RiverCity Motorway Group
- Type: Public
- Traded as: ASX: RCY
- Industry: Road transport
- Defunct: 17 September 2019
- Headquarters: Brisbane, Australia
- Area served: Brisbane
- Key people: Mark Snape (Chief Executive Officer)
- Services: Clem Jones Tunnel, FLOW tolling system
- Website: www.rivercitymotorway.com.au/

RiverCity Motorway Group was a Queensland company that operated Brisbane’s first private tollway — the Clem Jones Tunnel (CLEM7). They also established FLOW Tolling, a tolling service provider. Rivercity Motorways Group won the rights to be the maintainer of the Clem Jones Tunnel. When the tunnel opened in 2010 it was to have a concession period of 45 years before it was handed back to the City of Brisbane. The value of the tunnel was written down by $1.56 billion to $258 million in 2010.

The company was delisted in January 2016, liquidated and subsequently deregistered in September 2019.

== History ==
In 2006, an initial public offering raised $724 million.

=== Tunnel tolls ===
In June 2010, the toll for cars was dropped to $2.00 in an effort to increase patronage. Despite this the number of vehicles using the tunnel never significantly rose above about one third of forecast numbers. The price increased in November to $3.00 and again in April 2011 to $3.95. The last toll rise led to a decrease in usage of the tunnel.

=== Collapse ===
Due to much lower than forecasted patronage of the tunnel it has been unable to generate enough revenue. Debts still owed by Rivercity Motorway totalled A$1.3 billion. The company was placed into receivership in early 2011. The Rivercity Motorways Group was listed on the Australian Securities Exchange in June 2006. Shares in the company went into a trading halt on 24 February 2011. and the company was delisted in December 2015.

The collapse of this toll road operator follows similar failures for Sydney's Lane Cove Tunnel and the Cross City Tunnel.

In December 2013, Queensland Motorways, operator of the Gateway Motorway and Logan Motorway, acquired and took over the tolling and operation of CLEM7.

== Lawsuit ==
Investors of RiverCity Motorway Group sounded out the possibility of legal action against the troubled operators of Brisbane's first major tunnel project in late 2010. The forecasts for traffic modelling in the tunnel were conducted by Aecom. The class action lawsuit alleges that AECOM did not properly disclose various sets of figures related to traffic forecasts.
