= E-TAG =

Electronic toll collection system in Australia

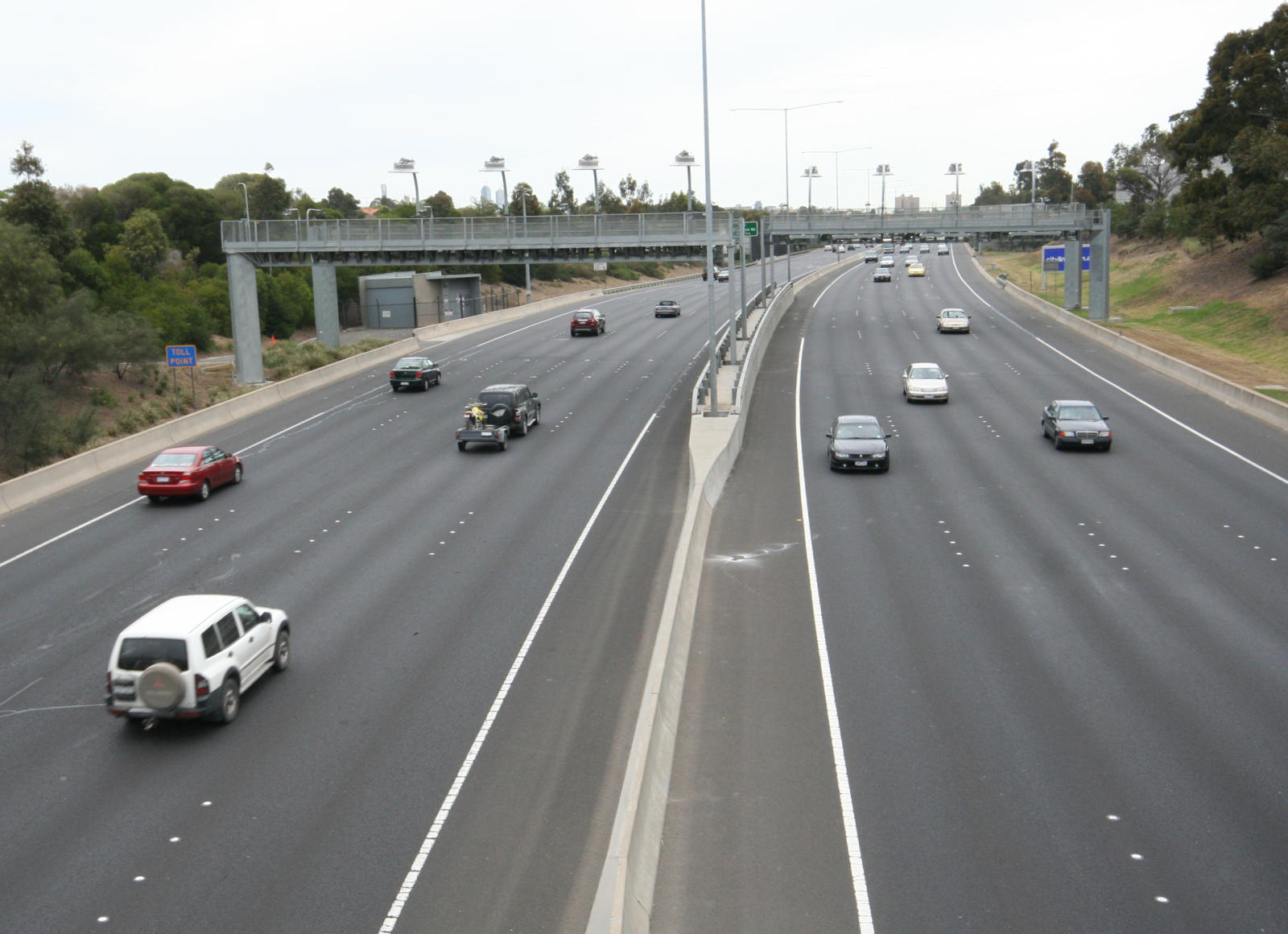
e-TAG toll gantries on the Tullamarine Freeway section of Melbourne's CityLink

e-TAG is a free-flow tolling electronic toll collection system used on all tollways throughout Australia. It was originally developed by Transurban for use on their CityLink tollway in the late 1990s, with the system since adopted by all toll roads, bridges and tunnels in Australia. The technology had different names depending on the issuer, such as Linkt (Transurban, includes former names E-way and go via), Breeze (ConnectEast for EastLink), and E-toll (Transport for NSW for Sydney Harbour Bridge and Tunnel). However, these are all interchangeable across Australia and no surcharges apply for use on other operators' toll roads.

Toll roads in Australia use free-flow tolling, with no toll booths along the entire length of the system to impede traffic flow. Australia was one of the first countries in the world to have complete, surcharge-free interoperability between rival tolling providers across different state roadway systems. In July 2007, both e-TAG and e-pass video tolling arrangements were introduced in the Sydney Harbour Tunnel, Westlink M7, Cross City Tunnel and the Lane Cove Tunnel. This measure substantially eased traffic jams heading towards electronic gantries, providing increased convenience and time savings. In early 2009, the Sydney Harbour Bridge became toll-booth free, requiring e-TAGs to be used.

There are over 850,000 e-TAG account customers, and over one million e-TAGs have been issued.

== Technology ==
The e-TAG electronic tolling is based on radio-frequency identification (RFID) transponders using the DSRC protocol. The system uses electronic transponders provided by Kapsch (called e-TAGs) mounted on the inside of the vehicles' windscreen. Gantries constructed over each carriageway record registration plates and detect the e-TAGs. As the vehicle continues along the toll road, additional gantries monitor the distance travelled. Associated software then determines the toll amount payable, which is automatically deducted from the prepaid account associated with the tag. Where a tag is not detected, the vehicle's registration is recorded using video tolling technology which incorporates an automatic number plate recognition system and checked against a government motor registration database.

For infrequent use of the system a user can buy a Daypass – by phone, online, at any Australia Post outlet or at participating service stations. A Daypass can be bought in advance or afterwards (until midnight three days later).

If payment has not been made after three days, the vehicle's registered owner will be sent a late toll invoice in the mail, and if the late toll invoice is then not paid a fine will be issued. In Victoria fines are issued by Civic Compliance Victoria.

The life of the battery in an e-TAG transponder is approximately five years. Customers are advised when a device is about to expire and to contact the issuer should their e-TAG not beep as they pass a tolling gantry, to receive a replacement device.

== See also ==
- CityLink
- E-ZPass
- FasTrak
- Transurban
- Westlink M7
- SANRAL
- Gauteng e-Toll
- Toll roads in Australia

== Official site ==
- Roam Tolling Pty Ltd
- Transurban Group (Parent Company)
