= Linkt =

E-TAG tolling brand in Australia

- Product type: Tolling system
- Current owner: Transurban
- Country: Australia
- Introduced: 2017 (as Linkt)
- Markets: Queensland, Melbourne, Sydney
- Website: www.linkt.com.au

Linkt is Transurban's e-TAG tolling brand in Australia. Linkt first replaced the Roam Express brand in Sydney in 2017, followed by the go via brand in Queensland in May 2018, and then the Citylink brand (tolling system only) in Melbourne in July that year. In August 2020, it also replaced the E-way brand that was used by Interlink Roads, the operator of M5 South-West Motorway and fully owned by Transurban since October 2019.

== History ==
=== Queensland ===
go via was the toll payment system introduced by Queensland Motorways as a part of free-flow tolling. It replaced the previous E Toll system in Queensland. The new system was introduced on 1 July 2009 and the "pay-on-the-spot" option was phased out on 22 July 2009, meaning cash was no longer a payment option, and stopping was no longer required. As drivers are no longer able to pay with cash, they need to choose one of the new methods of paying Queensland's toll roads, including Go Via tags, video/vehicle matching of licence plates and other methods.

go via has one million tolling accounts and more than 1.8 million Linkt tags in use as of 2013.

The go via network enables motorists to bypass CBD traffic and use of three Brisbane motorways; the Bruce Highway in the north, the Pacific Motorway to the south and the Ipswich Motorway to the west. There is also the LinktGo app for infrequent toll users but the phone app has higher charges compared to a physical e-tag device.

On 16 May 2018, go via was replaced by Linkt.

=== Sydney ===
Using the electronic tolling technology it developed for Citylink, Transurban launched the Roam brand in October 2005, two months before the Westlink M7 opened.

In January 2006, Transurban acquired Tollaust, who tolled and operated the M2 Hills Motorway. Electronic tolling was introduced on the M2 and Tollaust continued to manage the Roam Express tolling for the M2 motorway. Roam Express was rebranded Linkt in 2017.

As a result of Transurban obtaining full ownership of Interlink Roads and its M5 South-West Motorway in October 2019, the E-way brand issued by Interlink Roads was also replaced by Linkt.

== Tolling types ==
=== Tags ===
Tags are installed inside of a vehicle's windscreen. As a vehicle travels under the toll point the tag will beep and the toll is deducted from the account. Customers have the choice of configuring their account to automatically top up or to manually top-up their account. With the tag, users can use their account on all toll roads in Australia.

=== Video Tolling ===
With video tolling, users do not need a tag fitted to their vehicle: instead, as they pass under a toll point, a photo is taken of the registration plate and matched to their linkt account. There is a small additional "video/vehicle matching" fee for this service.

=== Business accounts ===
Businesses can choose to either have a tag account or video tolling account, with a required minimum spending per month.

=== Passes ===
Passes are designed for drivers who only use toll roads occasionally or for those who want to pay for a one-off trip.

==== Victoria ====
Linkt offers three pass types for Victoria:

- 24 Hour Pass
- Weekend Pass
- Melbourne Pass

The 24 Hour Pass splits into two sub pass types, a full pass and a limited pass.

- The full pass allows full travel on the CityLink Toll Road.
- The limited pass allows travel on the Tullamarine Freeway between Bulla Road (Melbourne Airport) and Flemington Road.

All Passes allows access onto the CityLink Tollway with the Melbourne Pass allowing additional access onto the EastLink Tollway.

==== New South Wales ====
Linkt only offers one pass type for New South Wales, which allows access to all toll road within Australia.

==== Queensland ====
Linkt only offers one pass type for Queensland which works on all toll roads in Queensland.

== Controversies ==
An online petition to protest toll charges and fines from Go Via (now Linkt) gained thousands of supporters in days, many from the Sunshine Coast.

== See also ==
- Road transport in Brisbane
