= M1 (Queensland) =

Road route in Brisbane, Queensland, Australia

Coordinates: 27°26′06.24″S 153°05′21.65″E

M1 Bruce Highway Gateway Motorway Pacific Motorway Queensland

General information
- Type: Motorway
- Length: 290 km (180 mi)
- Route number(s): M1

Major junctions
- North end: Bruce Highway, Curra, Queensland
- Gympie Arterial Road (M3); Port of Brisbane Motorway (M4); Logan Motorway (M6)
- South end: Pacific Motorway, NSW/QLD Border

Location(s)
- Major suburbs / towns: Nambour, Caboolture, Eagle Farm, Springwood, Nerang

Highway system
- Highways in Australia; National Highway • Freeways in Australia; Highways in Queensland

The M1 in Queensland, Australia, is a major urban road corridor. It connects the Sunshine Coast hinterland to Tugun, near the New South Wales and Queensland border, via the following corridors:

- Bruce Highway between Curra and Bald Hills
- Gateway Motorway between Bald Hills and Eight Mile Plains
- Pacific Motorway between Eight Mile Plains and Tugun

The Pacific Motorway continues on south from the M1 into New South Wales, while the Bruce Highway continues further north from the M1 up the Queensland coast. Both of these roads and the M1 itself are part of the line of route of National Highway 1, although M1 signage is used for that part of the corridor.

== Development ==
With the completion of Section C of the Bruce Highway - Cooroy to Curra upgrade project (Traveston to Woondum) in February 2018 the M1 has now been extended to Kybong, 10 kilometres (6.2 mi) south of Gympie. The Bruce Highway from Kybong to Gympie remains signed as A1. Section D of the project (Woondum to Curra, including a bypass of Gympie) will, when completed, become the next stage of the M1.

Note: While the references use Woondum as a designator for sections of the project the new intersection that marks the end of the M1 is wholly within the locality of Kybong, although bordered on two sides by Woondum.

== Travel Centres ==
A number of travel/service centres exist on the M1. These include:

- Bruce Highway
  - Caboolture (Both Directions)
  - Glasshouse Mountains (Both Directions)
  - Traveston (Northbound, Accessible for Southbound Traffic)
- Gateway Motorway
  - Nudgee (Northbound)
- Pacific Motorway
  - Stapylton (Southbound)
  - Coomera (Northbound)

== Major interchanges ==
Bruce Highway
Bruce Highway (A1) – continues north to Cairns
Myall Street (State Route 6) – Cooroy, Noosa
Eumundi–Noosa Road (State Route 12 east) – Eumundi, Noosa, Kenilworth
Yandina–Coolum Road (State Route 11) – Yandina, Coolum Beach
Nambour–Bli Bli Road (State Route 10 east / Tourist Drive 23 west) – Nambour, Bli Bli, Mapleton, Sunshine Coast Airport
Maroochydore Road (State Route 8) east / Nambour Connection Road west – Nambour, Woombye, Maroochydore, Big Pineapple
Sunshine Motorway (State Route 70) – Buderim, Mooloolaba
Steve Irwin Way (State Route 6 / Tourist Drive 24) west / Caloundra Road (State Route 6) east
D'Aguilar Highway (State Route 85) – Kilcoy
Uhlmann Road (State Route 60 west) – Burpengary
Deception Bay Road (State Route 26 east) – Burpengary, Narangba, Deception Bay
Anzac Avenue (State Route 71) – Petrie, Redcliffe
Gateway Motorway (M1) east / Gympie Arterial Road (M3) south – Gold Coast, Brisbane, Brisbane Airport
Gateway Motorway
Bruce Highway (M1) – Caboolture, Sunshine Coast, Cairns
Deagon Deviation (State Route 26) – Brighton, Redcliffe
Depot Road (State Route 27) – Deagon, Sandgate
Sandgate Road (State Route 26) – no exit
Southern Cross Way – to M7, Eagle Farm
Moreton Drive – Brisbane Airport
Kingsford Smith Drive – Eagle Farm, Hamilton
Southern Cross Way – to M7, Eagle Farm
Route becomes for Sir Leo Hielscher Bridges
Lytton Road (State Route 24) – Murarrie, Lytton
Port of Brisbane Motorway (M4) – Port of Brisbane, Murarrie, Lytton
Wynnum Road (State Route 23) – Tingalpa, Cannon Hill, Wynnum, Manly
Old Cleveland Road (State Route 22) – Sleeman Sports Complex
Mount Gravatt–Capalaba Road (Metroad 2 west / State Route 21 east) – Mackenzie, Wishart, Capalaba, Mount Gravatt
Miles Platting Road (State Route 56) – Eight Mile Plains, Eight Mile Plains busway station, Sunnybank
Pacific Motorway (M1 south-east / M3 north-west) – Logan, Logan Central
Pacific Motorway
Gateway Motorway (M1)
Rochedale Road (State Route 30)
Logan Road (State Route 30)
Paradise Road (State Route 50)
Chatswood Road (State Route 50)
Bryants Road (State Route 47)
Beenleigh — Redland Bay Road (State Route 47)
Logan Motorway (M6)
City Road (State Route 92)
Main Street (State Route 94)
Hope Island Road (State Route 4) / Tamborine — Oxenford Road (State Route 95)
Gold Coast Highway (State Route 2)
Smith Street Motorway (State Route 10)
Southport–Nerang Road (State Route 20)
Nerang–Broadbeach Road (State Route 90)
Nielsons Road (State Route 40)
Gold Coast–Springbrook Road (Gooding Drive, State Route 50)
Robina Parkway (State Route 42)
The Link Way (State Route 99)
Somerset Drive / Robina Parkway (State Route 7)
Reedy Creek Road (State Route 80)
Bermuda Street (State Route 3)
Stewart Road (State Route 98) – to Gold Coast Highway (State Route 2)
Pacific Motorway (M1) – continues south into New South Wales

== Metroad 1 ==
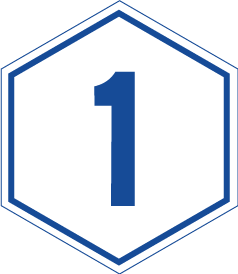
Metroad 1 route marker

Metroad 1 in Brisbane, Queensland, Australia, is the former designation of the M1 road corridor in Brisbane. It connected Bald Hills to the southern suburb of Beenleigh via Gateway Motorway, between Bald Hills and Eight Mile Plains, and Pacific Motorway, between Eight Mile Plains and Beenleigh.

== Incidents ==
- On 4 August 2017, a tanker carrying hydrochloric acid caught fire and exploded on the M1 near Loganholme, resulting in a 1km exclusion perimeter. There were no injuries.

== See also ==
- Metroad
