= Sir Leo Hielscher Bridges =

Twin road bridges in Queensland, Australia

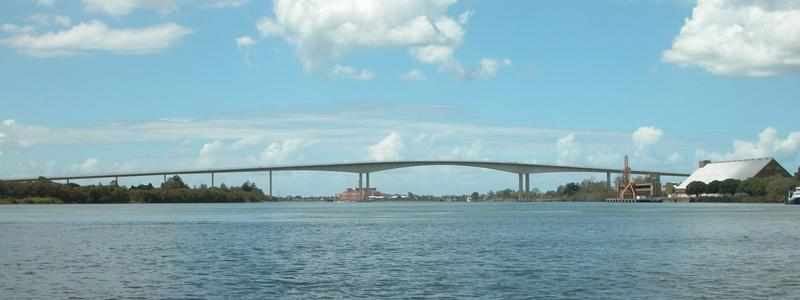
- The Gateway Bridge (now named Sir Leo Hielscher Bridges), pictured from the Brisbane River in 2003.
- Coordinates: 27°26′40″S 153°06′02″E
- Carries: Motor vehicles
- Crosses: Brisbane River
- Locale: Brisbane, Queensland, Australia
- Official name: Sir Leo Hielscher Bridges

Characteristics
- Design: Twin concrete cantilever box girder
- Total length: 1,627 metres (5,338 ft)
- Width: 22 metres (72 ft)
- Height: 64.5 metres (212 ft) above river level
- Longest span: 260 metres (850 ft)
- Clearance below: 59.2 m (194.2 ft) at mid-span

History
- Construction cost: $92 million (1986); $350 million (2010)
- Opened: 11 January 1986; 40 years ago (1986 span); 22 May 2010; 16 years ago (2010 span)

Location
- Interactive map of Sir Leo Hielscher Bridges

The Sir Leo Hielscher Bridges, formerly and still collectively referred to as the Gateway Bridge, are a pair of twin road bridges that carry the Gateway Motorway (M1) over the Brisbane River, skirting the eastern suburbs of the city of Brisbane. The western bridge carries traffic to the north and the eastern bridge carries traffic to the south. They are the most eastern crossings of the Brisbane River and the closest to Moreton Bay, crossing at the Quarries Reach and linking the suburbs of Eagle Farm and Murarrie. The original western bridge (formerly named the Gateway Bridge) was opened on 11 January 1986 and cost A$92 million to build. The duplicate bridge was opened on 22 May 2010, and cost $350 million.

In February 2010, the Queensland Government renamed the Gateway Bridge and its duplicate the Sir Leo Hielscher Bridges. Following the announcement, an opinion poll conducted by Brisbane's Channel Nine News showed that 97% of people were against the decision to rename the bridge and that most would continue to call it the Gateway Bridge.

A public open day for the duplicate bridge was held on 16 May 2010 and the new bridge was opened to traffic on 22 May 2010, six months ahead of schedule. Following the opening, the old bridge was refurbished, three vehicle lanes at a time. From November 2010 the two bridges carry 12 lanes of vehicle traffic (six in each direction). The associated upgrade of the Gateway Motorway south of the bridge was completed in May 2010 to coincide with the new bridge opening.

To pay for the duplication of the bridge, a toll was imposed on the original bridge in 2005, and on the new bridge when the latter opened. The bridges are tolled using the Linkt (formerly go via) electronic system and will remain so until 2051. The toll booths were removed and free flow tolling began in July 2009. The booth removal saw an immediate drop in road crashes due to the reduction in queuing and weaving at the toll booths on the southern approach.

== History ==
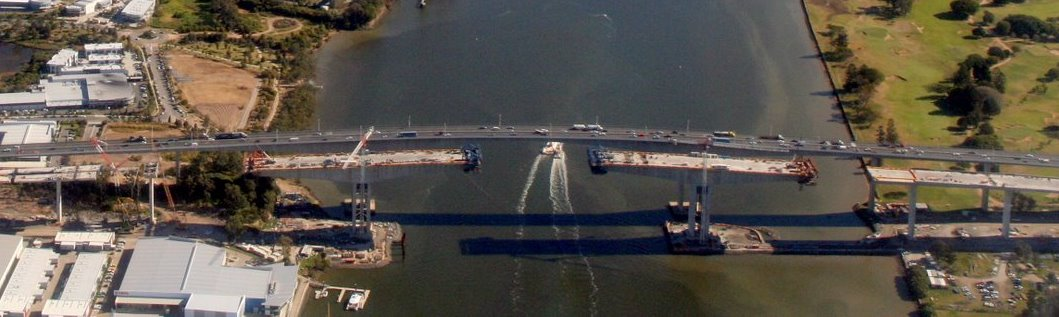
Gateway Bridge under construction

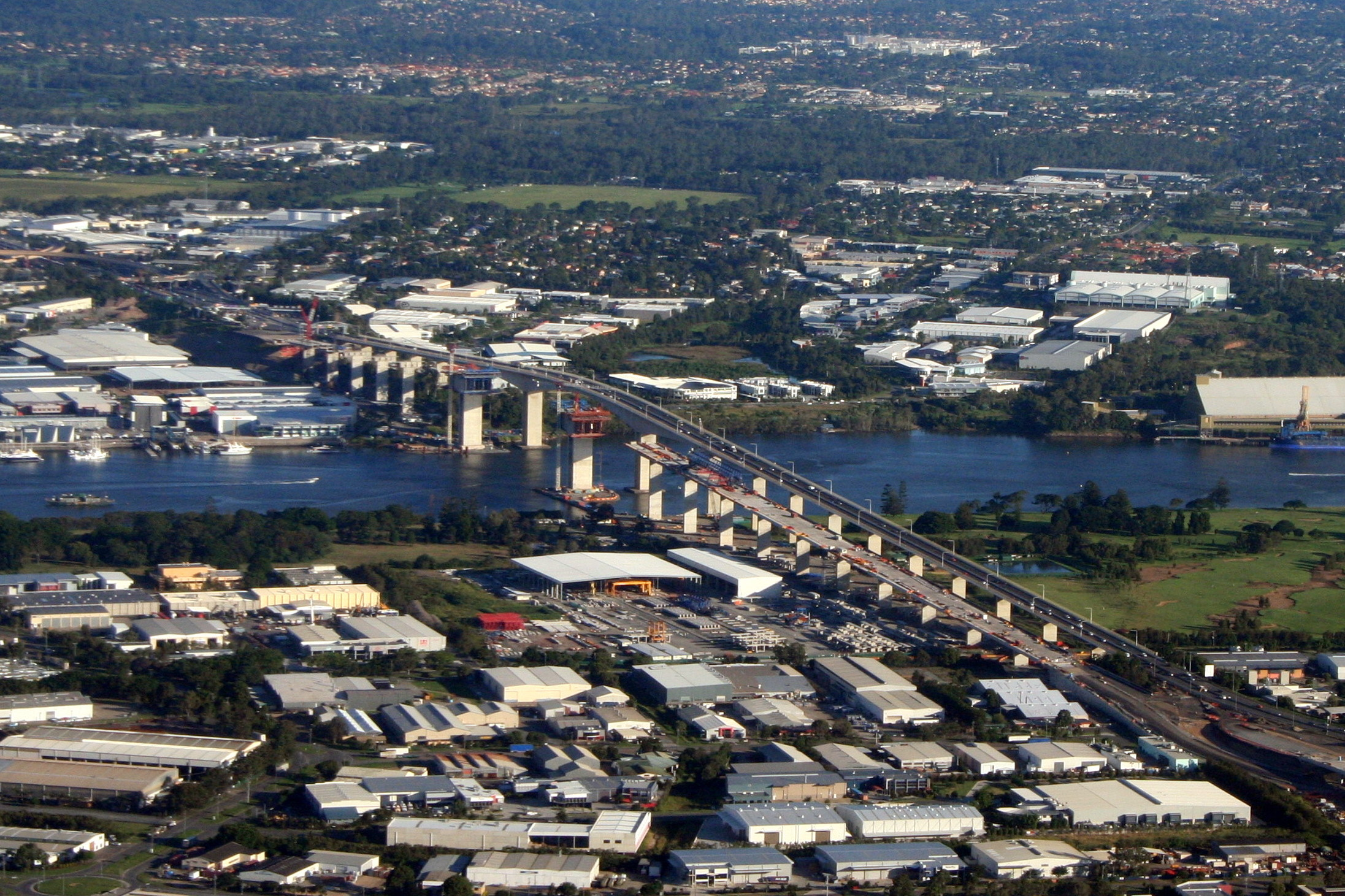
Gateway Bridge under construction

Construction on the Gateway Bridge commenced on 5 June 1980. The construction of the bridge started before the design was completed, to fast track its construction. It was officially opened on 11 January 1986 by Premier of Queensland Joh Bjelke-Petersen. On this day 200,000 people crossed the bridge by foot as part of the opening activities.

In 1986 the bridge carried an average of 12,500 vehicles per day. In 2001 the bridge was crossed by 27 million vehicles (approximately 73,975 vehicles per day). In early 2010 the single bridge was carrying an average of 100,000 vehicles per day.

The annual Bridge to Brisbane fun run has begun from the southern entrance to the bridge from its first year until 2015, when it was moved, and again since 2021, after being moved back.

== Design ==
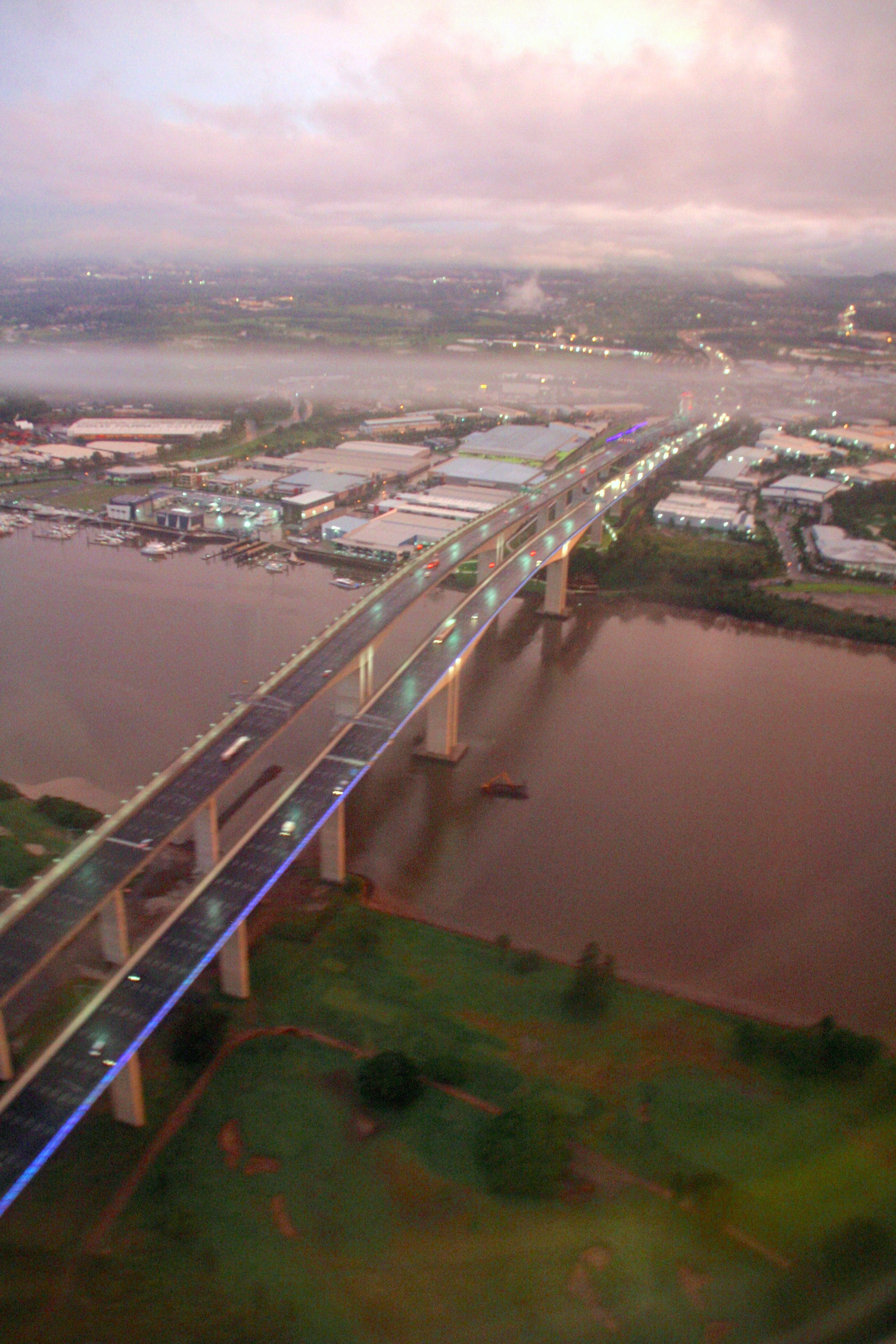
Gateway Bridge

In 1979, a tender was called by the Queensland Main Roads Department for a new bridge crossing of the Brisbane River. The conforming design main span was designed as a balanced cantilever with two raised post tensioned concrete compression stays located on the median and over each of the two main piers to support the 260-metre span. Due to the proximity of the Brisbane Airport, an overall structural height constraint was provided due to aircraft flight path and clearances. This constraint ruled out the possibility of a conventional cable-stayed bridge due to the height of the pylons that would be required. Due to cost considerations, an alternative design concept was proposed by Bruce Ramsay (Manager Engineering) of VSL. This alternative design required a world record main span of 260 m for a free cantilever, concrete box girder bridge. The concept was adopted by one of the tenderers – Transfield Queensland Pty.Ltd. who was subsequently awarded the project on the basis of this alternative. It held the record span of 260 m for over 15 years. The box girder is still the largest prestressed concrete, single box in the world, measuring 15 m deep at the pier, with a box width of 12 m and an overall deck width for the six lanes of 22 m.

As stated above the bridge owes its distinctive shape to air traffic requirements restricting its height to under 80 metres (260 ft) above sea level (all features of the bridge including light poles) coupled with shipping needs requiring a navigational clearance of 55 metres (180 ft).

The bridge has six lanes (originally three lanes in each direction, which were subsequently reconfigured to six lanes of northbound traffic after opening of the duplicate bridge).

The bridge was financed by funds borrowed by the Queensland Government, and as a result, users of the bridge pay a toll when crossing the bridge in either direction. The bridge is operated and maintained by Transurban Queensland.

The total length is 1,627 metres (5,338 feet). This is divided into a southern approach of 376 metres (1,234 feet), a northern approach of 731 metres (2,398 feet) and the three central spans of 520 metres (1,710 feet). The record main span is 260 metres (850 feet) long by 64.5 metres (212 feet) high, which is equivalent to a 20-storey building. A total of 150,000 tonnes (165,000 short tons) of concrete was used to construct the bridge.

The original design did not include a safety fence to prevent suicide attempts and base jumping. Three-metre high safety fences attached to the top of the concrete traffic barrier were later installed to prevent these incidents occurring. Anti-climbing screens are part of the second bridge's security features.

== Duplication ==
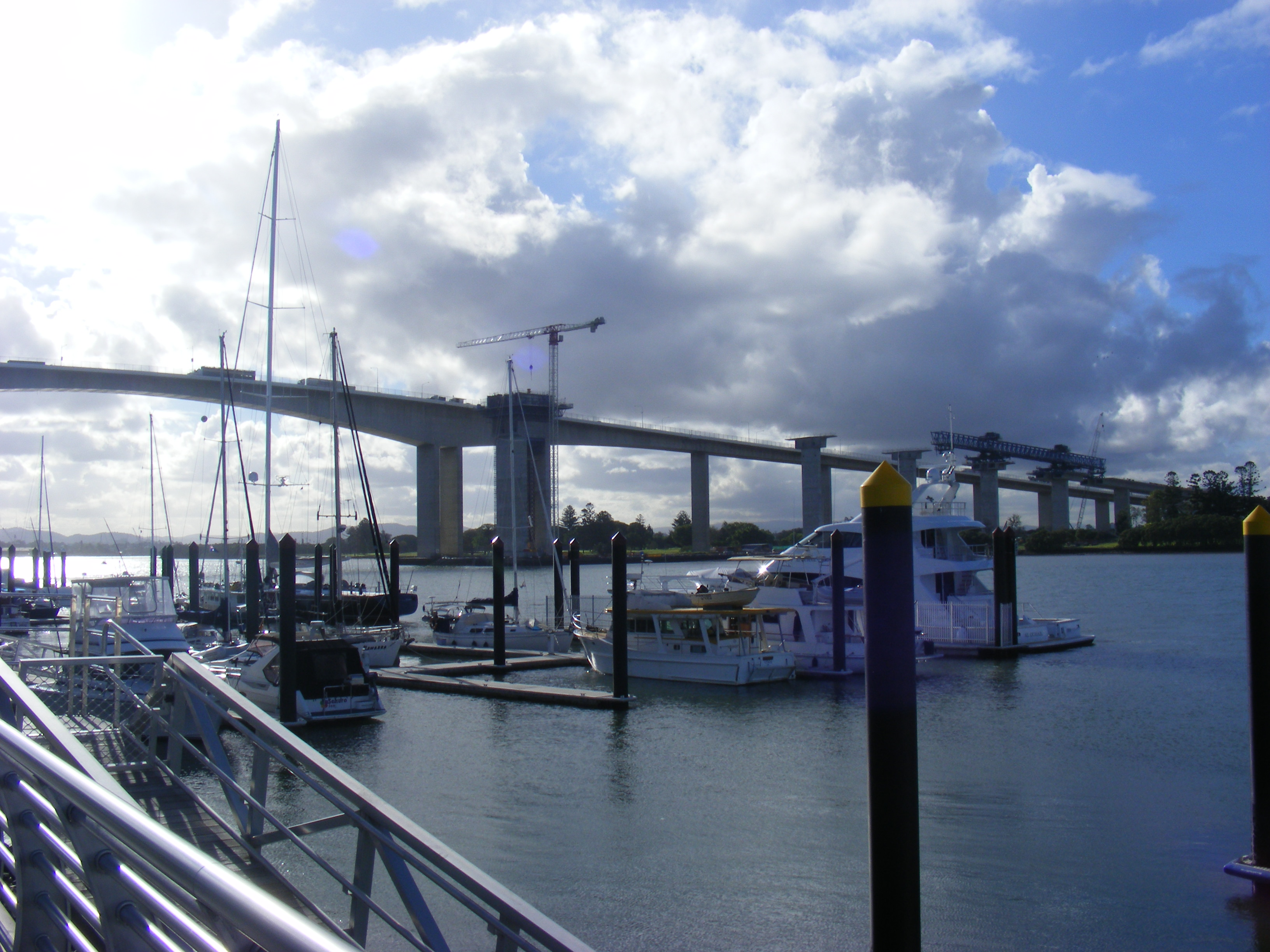
Gateway Bridges from south bank of Brisbane River (Rivergate Marina)

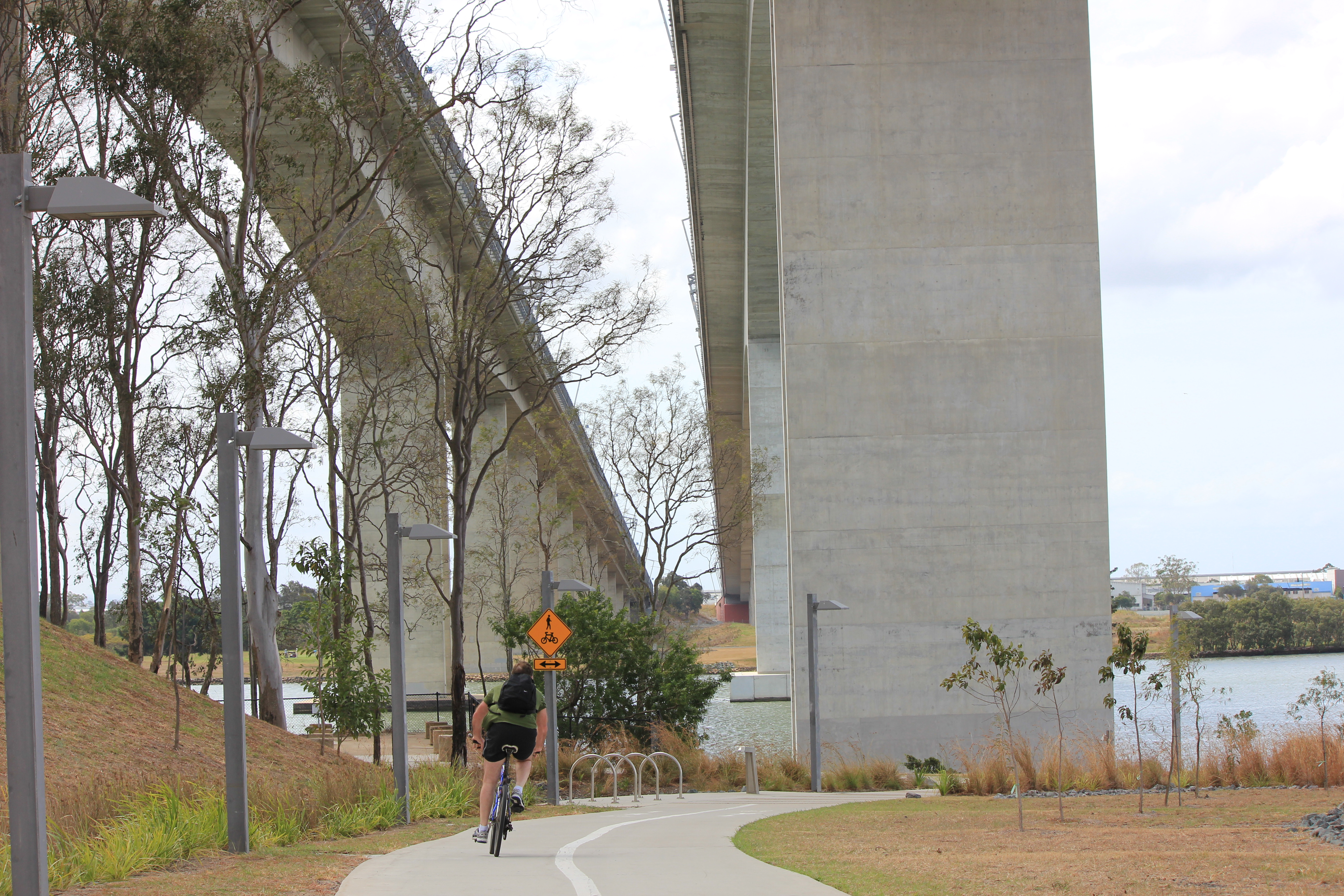
Park and pathway on south side

In 2005, a major upgrade of the Gateway Motorway was announced. A Leighton Contractors / Abigroup joint venture was awarded a contract to upgrade the motorway. The A$1.88 billion Gateway Upgrade Project includes the duplication of the Gateway Bridge and upgrades to 20 km (12 mi) of the Gateway Motorway from Mt Gravatt-Capalaba Road in the south to Nudgee Road in the north. The bridge duplication was the largest bridge and road development in Queensland's history. The duplicate bridge was specified to have a design life of 300 years.

To the south, the upgrade included widening 12 km (7 mi) of the Gateway Motorway from four to six lanes. To the north, it involved the construction of the 7 km (4 mi) Gateway Motorway deviation, an entirely new six-lane motorway between the Gateway Bridge and Nudgee Road. The deviation runs east of the original motorway through Brisbane Airport Corporation land and provides an alternative means of access to Brisbane Airport (the only effective access from the south). The new bridge provides a bicycle path unlike the first crossing.

The Wynnum Road upgrade was completed on 13 July 2007 and two additional southbound lanes between the Port of Brisbane Motorway and Wynnum Road completed in late 2007. Four of six lanes of the new Gateway Motorway deviation were opened in July 2009. All works south of the river were complete by the end of 2009 after 10 years of constant roadwork and traffic disruption. The final concrete pour linking the sides of the new bridge was made in October 2009. A total of 748 concrete segments, which are supported by 17 piers, were placed for the new bridge.

The duplicate bridge was completed in May 2010 along with the remaining lanes of the Gateway Motorway deviation.

In October 2010, then Minister for Main Roads, Craig Wallace, announced that the original course of the Gateway Motorway via Eagle Farm would be renamed to Southern Cross Way, after Sir Charles Kingsford Smith's aircraft, the Southern Cross, which landed at Eagle Farm in 1928, and so as to avoid confusion with the newly opened Gateway Motorway deviation. The new Gateway Motorway deviation was given the name Gateway Motorway. However, like the renaming of the bridges themselves, the change to Southern Cross Way was not without controversy, attracting criticism from the then Shadow Minister for Main Roads and Transport, Fiona Simpson.

Refurbishment of the existing bridge was completed in November 2010.

== Awards ==
In 2009 as part of the Q150 celebrations, the Gateway Bridge was announced as one of the Q150 Icons of Queensland for its role as a "structure and engineering feat".

== See also ==
- List of Australian freeways
- List of bridges
- Metroad
