= Gateway Motorway =

Motorway in Brisbane, Queensland, Australia

Gateway Motorway Queensland
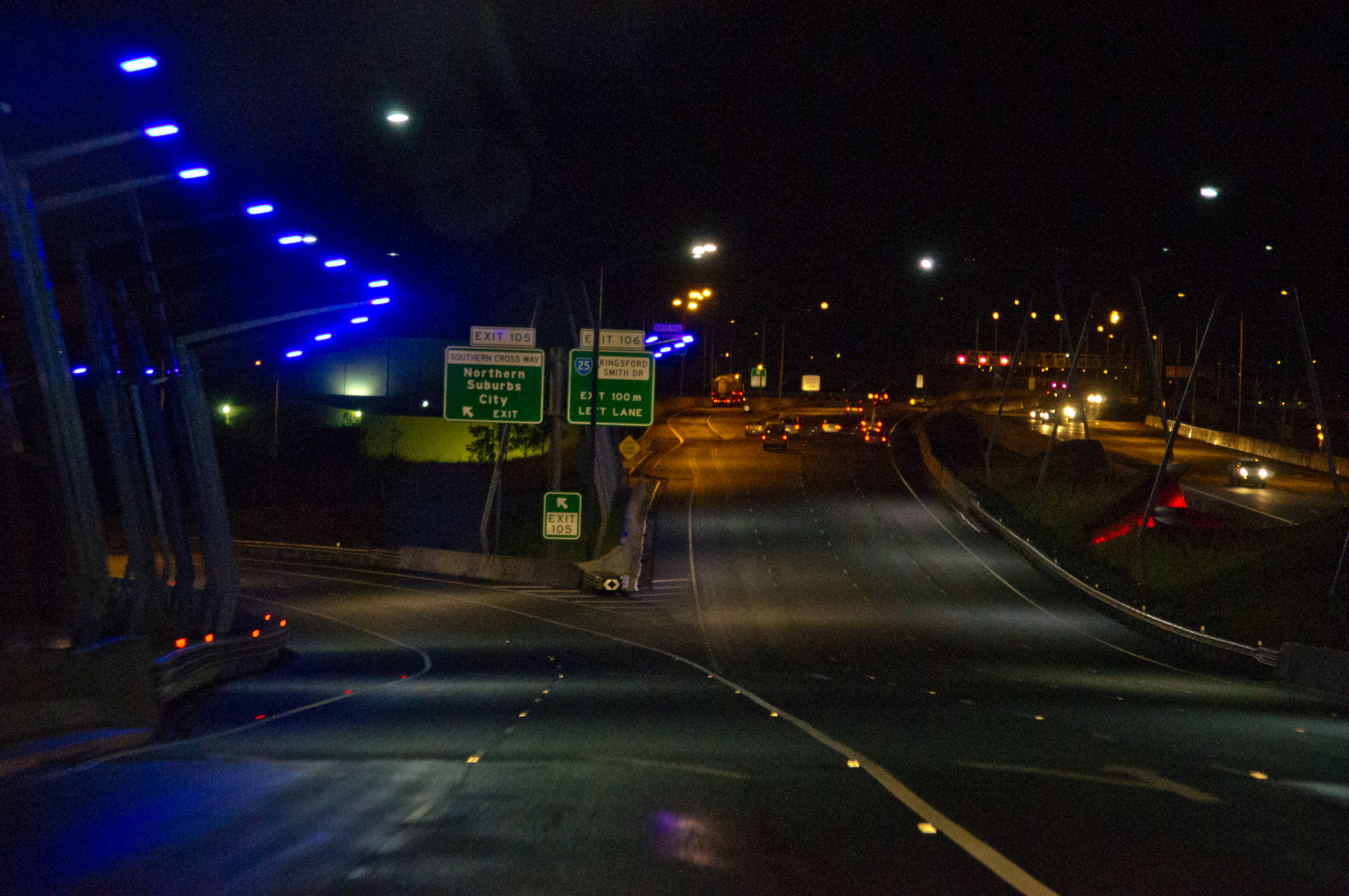

General information
- Type: Highway
- Length: 48 km (30 mi)
- Route number(s): M1; (Bald Hills – Eight Mile Plains); M2; (Eight Mile Plains – Drewvale)

Major junctions
- North end: Bruce Highway Bald Hills, Brisbane
- Gympie Arterial Road; Deagon Deviation; Port of Brisbane Motorway; Pacific Motorway
- South end: Logan Motorway; Drewvale, Brisbane

Location(s)
- Major settlements: Nudgee, Eagle Farm, Belmont, Eight Mile Plains

Highway system
- Highways in Australia; National Highway • Freeways in Australia; Highways in Queensland

The Gateway Motorway (M2 to Eight Mile Plains and M1 to Bald Hills) is a major tolled motorway in Brisbane, Queensland, Australia which includes the Sir Leo Hielscher Bridges (former Gateway Bridge). The motorway is operated by toll road operator Transurban.

It bypasses Brisbane in order to provide easier access between the Gold Coast, Sunshine Coast, Ipswich and Toowoomba. It runs from the M2 Logan Motorway in Drewvale (near Browns Plains) to the Bruce Highway in Bald Hills. At the interchange with the Pacific Motorway at Eight Mile Plains (Pacific Motorway exit 16), its original terminus pre-1997, the route number changes from M2 (Logan Motorway – Pacific Motorway) to M1 (Pacific Motorway – Bruce Highway (Gympie Arterial Road)). The Sir Leo Hielscher Bridges are part of the Gateway Motorway and the Motorway provides access to the Port of Brisbane, Brisbane Airport and Brisbane Entertainment Centre.

According to Transurban the motorway was used by 125,000 vehicles per day in 2023.

== Background ==
The motorway was constructed to connect the then-recently opened Gateway Bridge to the Bruce Highway in the north and the South-East Freeway (renamed Pacific Motorway in 2000) in the south. Construction on the road commenced in March 1985 and it was opened to traffic in four stages between August and December 1986.

When first opened, the Gateway Bridge and supporting roads extended only to Airport Drive in the north and Lytton Road in the south. After completion of the entire route, it was named the Gateway Arterial Road, since the existence of three large roundabouts north of the Brisbane River disqualified it from being a motorway. To cope with the heavier than expected traffic, the government began upgrading the road in 1987, only a year after it opened. Duplication to four lanes and grade-separation was completed in several stages between 1989 and 1996.

In 1995, construction began on a southern extension to the Logan Motorway, creating the Southern Brisbane Bypass for easier access to Ipswich and Toowoomba. The road was opened to traffic by Vaughan Johnson, then-Minister for Transport and Main Roads, on 13 May 1997. Following this work, the road was renamed Gateway Motorway.

In 2007, construction began on the Gateway Upgrade Project, which duplicated the Gateway Bridge, added a deviation between Eagle Farm and Nudgee and upgraded the motorway south of the river. The duplicate Gateway Bridge was opened on 24 May 2010 and both bridges were renamed the Sir Leo Hielscher Bridges. The original bridge was refurbished to match the new structure and was finished on 28 November 2010. The northern deviation was routed east from its old alignment (the old alignment is now named Southern Cross Way) and added a second access road, Moreton Drive, to Brisbane Airport. The deviation opened on 19 July 2009 whilst Moreton Drive opened on 3 December 2009. South of the bridges, the motorway was expanded to 9 lanes up to the Wynnum Road interchange, and 8 lanes to the Old Cleveland Road interchange. From that point the motorway is six lanes up to the Pacific Motorway Merge. The upgrades between Lytton Road and Mount Gravatt-Capalaba Road were completed on 28 January 2010, while the final stage between Mount Gravatt-Capalaba Road and Pacific Motorway (also the final stage of the entire Gateway Motorway Upgrade) was opened to traffic on 30 July 2011.

Manual toll booths were removed and replaced with electronic toll gates (which require vehicles to have a transponder attached to the windscreen) in 2010.

== Tolls ==
The motorway has three toll points, the Murarrie, Kuraby and Compton Road toll points. The Murarrie toll point is located immediate south of the Sir Leo Hielscher Bridges and charges all vehicles travelling on the bridges. The Kuraby toll point is located north of Compton Road and charges vehicles between the Logan Road / Pacific Motorway and Compton Road / Logan Motorway. The nearby Compton Road toll point is located on the northbound exit and southbound entry ramps to/from Compton Road, which opened in 2019. The sections north of Brisbane Airport and between Port of Brisbane Motorway and Logan Road are toll-free.

The Murarrie toll point was introduced in 2005 to fund the duplication of the Sir Leo Hielscher Bridges. At the time, the Murarrie tolls were proposed to expire in 2041.

In 2011, tolls on the Gateway (Kuraby toll point) and Logan Motorways were extended from 2018 to 2051, as well as the Murarrie tolls, as a result of the transfer of Queensland Motorways' tollways to the Queensland Investment Corporation (QIC).

The motorway is operated by Transurban Queensland. The state continues to own the road and bridge infrastructure.

Toll prices as of 1 July 2025
Toll road		Class 1 (Motorcycles)	Class 2 (Cars)	Class 3 (Light Commercial Vehicles)	Class 4 (Heavy Commercial Vehicles)	Toll increase	Toll concessionaire	Expiry of toll concession
Gateway Motorway	Murarrie toll point (Sir Leo Hielscher Bridges)	$2.90	$5.78	$8.68	$19.91	Annually on 1 July, by CPI	Transurban Queensland (Note: Under a long-term concession agreement with the state) (62.5% owned by Transurban)	31 December 2051
Gateway Motorway	Kuraby and Compton Road toll points	$1.71	$3.41	$5.12	$11.75	Annually on 1 July, by CPI	Transurban Queensland (62.5% owned by Transurban)	31 December 2051

== Construction history ==
- 1986 – Gateway Bridge and associated approach roads (Lytton Road to Airport Drive) officially opened by QLD Premier Sir Joh Bjelke-Petersen on 11 January 1986.
- 1986 – Stage 1 Gateway Arterial Road (Airport Drive to Toombul Road). Two-lane arterial road and extension of Toombul Road officially opened by Federal Minister for Transport Peter Morris on 8 August 1986.
- 1986 – Stage 2 Gateway Arterial Road (Depot Road to Bruce Highway). Two-lane arterial road and connections to Deagon Deviation officially opened by Minister for Main Roads and Racing Russ Hinze on 17 October 1986.
- 1986 – Stage 3 Gateway Arterial Road (South-East Freeway to Lytton Road). Two-lane arterial road from South-East Freeway to Wynnum Road, and four-lane motorway from Wynnum Road to Lytton Road officially opened by Minister for Main Roads and Racing Russ Hinze on 17 November 1986.
- 1986 – Stage 4 Gateway Arterial Road (Toombul Road to Depot Road). Two-lane arterial road and extension of Bicentennial Road officially opened by Minister for Main Roads and Racing Russ Hinze on 11 December 1986.
- 1989 – Airport Drive to Cannery Drain duplication. Duplication to four lanes including interchange at Airport Drive officially commissioned by Deputy Premier and Minister for Main Roads Bill Gunn on 26 July 1989.
- 1990 – Mt Gravatt-Capalaba Road interchange, and Mt Gravatt-Capalaba Road to Wynnum Road duplication.
- 1991 – Cannery Drain to Bicentennial Road duplication. Duplication to four lanes and Nudgee Road interchange concurrently commissioned by Federal Minister for Transport Bob Brown on 19 September 1991.
- 1992 – Old Cleveland Road interchange. Overpass bridges officially opened by Federal Minister for Transport Bob Brown on 4 February 1992.
- 1992 – Bicentennial Road to Depot Road duplication. Duplication to four lanes commissioned by Federal Minister for Transport Bob Brown on 3 December 1992.
- 1993 – Bicentennial Road interchange. Overpass bridges officially opened by Federal Minister for Transport Bob Brown on 12 February 1993.
- 1993 – Toombul Road interchange. Four-lane overpass bridge officially opened by MP Wayne Swan on 25 October 1993.
- 1993 – Miles Platting Road to Mount Gravatt-Capalaba Road duplication. Duplication to four lanes completed in November 1993.
- 1996 – Depot Road to Bruce Highway duplication. Duplication to four lanes and southbound Deagon Deviation overpass completed April 1996.
- 1997 – Southern Brisbane Bypass (South–East Freeway–Logan Motorway). Southerly extension of Gateway Motorway officially opened by Minister for Main Roads Vaughan Johnson on 13 May 1997.
- 2010 – Eight Mile Plains to Nudgee – Widening to three lanes in each direction. Also duplicating the Gateway Bridge. Including variable speed limits.
- March 2019 – Nudgee to Bracken Ridge. Widening to three lanes in each direction. Including smart motorway technologies.
- August 2019 – Logan Enhancement Project. Widening to three lanes in each direction from Compton Road to Logan Motorway, and new south-facing ramps at Compton Road.
- December 2020 – Heavy vehicle restrictions eased on Gateway flyover of Gympie Arterial Road.

== Upgrade projects ==
A project to plan and construct upgrades to the Gateway Motorway and the Bruce Highway, at a cost of $2.1 billion, was in planning in July 2022 with finalisation of business cases expected in 2023. Major components are:

- Upgrading the Gateway Motorway (Bracken Ridge to Pine River).
- Upgrading the Bruce Highway (Gateway Motorway to Dohles Rocks Road).
- Upgrading Gympie Arterial Road (Strathpine Road to Gateway Motorway).
- Delivering north-facing ramps (northern connections) at Dohles Rocks Road interchange to the Bruce Highway.
- Building the North South Urban Arterial corridor between Dohles Rocks Road and Anzac Avenue.

== Interchanges ==
The kilometres shown below are subject to change as upgrades to the road are implemented. The entire motorway is in the City of Brisbane local government area.

Location	km	mi	Exit (Note: Exit number 11 is part of Logan Motorway exit numbering)	Destinations	Notes
Bald Hills	0	0.0	127	Bruce Highway (M1) – Caboolture, Sunshine Coast, Gympie	Northern motorway terminus at partial Y interchange: merges with Gympie Arterial Road to continue as Bruce Highway
Bracken Ridge	2.6– 3.9	1.6– 2.4	123	Bracken Ridge Road – to M3, Bracken Ridge, Brighton, Sandgate	No southbound entrance
Deagon	5.1– 5.6	3.2– 3.5	120B	Depot Road (State Route 27) – Deagon, Sandgate	No southbound exit
Deagon	5.6– 5.9	3.5– 3.7	120A	Deagon Deviation (State Route 26) – Brighton, Redcliffe	Northbound exit and southbound entrance
Boondall	8.6– 9.5	5.3– 5.9	117	Bicentennial Road – Boondall, Brisbane Entertainment Centre, Boondall Wetlands	Roundabout interchange
Nudgee	13.1– 14.7	8.1– 9.1	112	Nudgee Road – Nudgee, Nudgee Beach	Direct northbound access to Nudgee Service Centre
Brisbane Airport	15.5	9.6	110	Southern Cross Way – to M7, Eagle Farm	Partial Y interchange: no northbound exit to or southbound entrance from Southern Cross Way
Brisbane Airport	16.9– 18.0	10.5– 11.2	108	Moreton Drive – Brisbane Airport	
Eagle Farm	20.8– 20.9	12.9– 13.0	106	Kingsford Smith Drive – Eagle Farm, Hamilton	Northbound exit and southbound entrance
Eagle Farm	21.2	13.2	105	Southern Cross Way – to M7, Eagle Farm	Partial Y interchange: no southbound exit to or northbound entrance from Southern Cross Way
Brisbane River	21.3– 22.9	13.2– 14.2	Sir Leo Hielscher Bridges (Murarrie toll point)		
Murarrie	23.1	14.4	103	Lytton Road (State Route 24) – Murarrie, Lytton	Southbound exit and northbound entrance
Murarrie	23.2– 24.1	14.4– 15.0	102	Port of Brisbane Motorway (M4) – Port of Brisbane, Murarrie, Lytton	
Tingalpa	25.2– 26.6	15.7– 16.5	100	Wynnum Road (State Route 23) – Tingalpa, Cannon Hill, Wynnum, Manly	
Belmont	28.4– 30.0	17.6– 18.6	97	Old Cleveland Road (State Route 22), Sleeman Sports Complex	Three-level diamond interchange
Mackenzie–Rochedale boundary	33.4– 34.7	20.8– 21.6	92	Mount Gravatt – Capalaba Road (Metroad 2 west / State Route 21 east) – Mackenzie, Wishart, Capalaba, Mount Gravatt	
Rochedale	37.5– 38.5	23.3– 23.9	88	Miles Platting Road (State Route 56) – Eight Mile Plains, Eight Mile Plains busway station, Rochedale	
Rochedale–Eight Mile Plains boundary	38.0– 38.4	23.6– 23.9	87	Pacific Motorway (M1 south–east / M3 north–west) – Logan, Logan Central	Northbound entrance from Pacific Motorway north–westbound and southbound exit to Pacific Motorway south–eastbound only; route transition: Northern end of M2, southern end of M1 allocation
Eight Mile Plains	38.7– 39.4	24.0– 24.5	86	Logan Road (State Route 95) – Underwood, Eight Mile Plains, Mt Gravatt	Formerly Exit 1
Kuraby	42.3– 42.4	26.3– 26.3	Kuraby toll point		
Kuraby–Runcorn–Stretton–Karawatha quadripoint	42.3– 42.7	26.3– 26.5	83	Compton Road (State Route 30) – Kuraby, Runcorn	Northbound entrance via Persse Road
Kuraby–Runcorn–Stretton–Karawatha quadripoint	43.2– 43.7	26.8– 27.2	83	Compton Road (State Route 30) – Kuraby, Runcorn	Toll points on northbound exit and southbound entrance only
Drewvale	47.0– 47.1	29.2– 29.3	78	Logan Motorway (M2 westbound / M6 eastbound) – Ipswich, Toowoomba, Logan, Gold Coast	Southern terminus at trumpet interchange; Logan Motorway eastbound signed as Exit 9
Drewvale	48.5	30.1	11	Beaudesert Road – Acacia Ridge, Brisbane, Regents Park, Beaudesert	Southern terminus. Exit number 11 is part of Logan Motorway exit numbering. Exit before merge onto Logan Motorway.
Electronic toll collection; Incomplete access

== Southern Cross Way ==
Southern Cross Way
- Location: Eagle Farm to Nudgee
- Length: 7 km (4.3 mi)

Southern Cross Way is a 7 kilometres (4.3 mi), 4 lane motorway which branches from the Gateway Motorway at Eagle Farm before merging back with it at Nudgee. Prior to 2010, Southern Cross Way formed part of the Gateway Motorway before the Gateway Upgrade Project constructed a shorter route (and additional Brisbane Airport access road, Moreton Drive), between those two suburbs. The old, longer motorway section was preserved, connected to the deviation and renamed Southern Cross Way, after the aircraft flown by aviator Charles Kingsford Smith, to allow motorists to distinguish between the routes. Southern Cross Way (also colloquially called the 'Old Gateway Motorway') thus follows the previous alignment of the Gateway Motorway between Eagle Farm and Nudgee and has three exits.

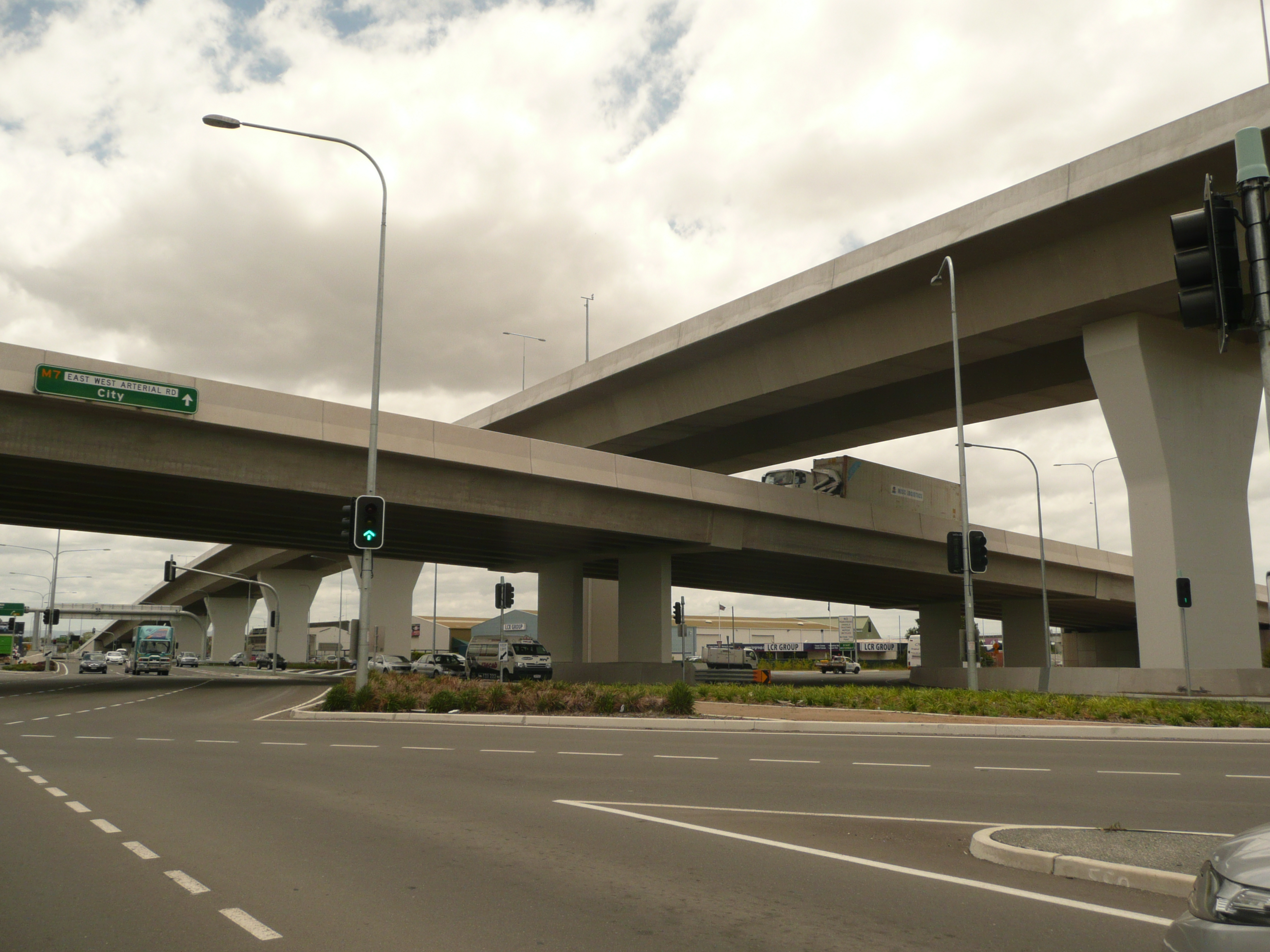
Airport Flyover over the Southern Cross Way

=== Interchanges ===
The entire motorway is in the City of Brisbane local government area.

Location	km	mi	Destinations	Notes
Brisbane Airport	0	0.0	Gateway Motorway (M1) north – to Caboolture, Sunshine Coast, Cairns via Bruce Highway	Northern terminus at partial Y interchange: no southbound exit to or northbound entrance from Gateway Motorway
Brisbane Airport	1.9	1.2	Toombul Road – Virginia	Roundabout interchange
Brisbane Airport – Hendra boundary	3.5	2.2	East–West Arterial Road (M7) west / Airport Drive east – Nundah, Clayfield, Brisbane Airport	
Eagle Farm	5.8– 6.7	3.6– 4.2	Kingsford Smith Drive – Eagle Farm, Hamilton	Northbound exit via Fison Avenue West; southbound exit and entrance via Links Avenue North
Eagle Farm	7.6	4.7	Gateway Motorway (M1) south – to Gold Coast, Tweed Heads, Gold Coast Airport via Pacific Motorway	Southern terminus at partial Y interchange: no northbound exit to or southbound entrance from Gateway Motorway
Incomplete access

== See also ==
- Freeways in Brisbane
- M1, Queensland
- Sir Leo Hielscher Bridges
