= M7/A7 (Brisbane) =

Road in Queensland, Australia

Coordinates: 27°33′33″S 153°00′06.3″E

The (M7/A7) in Brisbane, Queensland, Australia, is a major urban road corridor. It extends from the M2/M7 Ipswich Motorway/Logan Motorway junction at Gailes via Ipswich Road at Woolloongabba, Clem Jones Tunnel and Airport Link to the junction with Southern Cross Way which links with the Gateway Motorway.

The full route, completed in 2012, comprise:

- (M7) Ipswich Motorway from Gailes to Rocklea
- (A7) Ipswich Road from Rocklea to Woolloongabba
- (M7) Clem Jones Tunnel from Woolloongabba to Bowen Hills
- (M7) Airport Link tunnel from Bowen Hills to Toombul
- (M7) East West Arterial Road from Toombul to Hendra.

== Major intersections ==
Ipswich Motorway and Ipswich Road each has a road junction list. No RJL exists for Clem Jones Tunnel or Airport Link Tunnel.
