= Leo Hielscher =

Australian public servant (1926–2025)

Sir Leo Hielscher AC
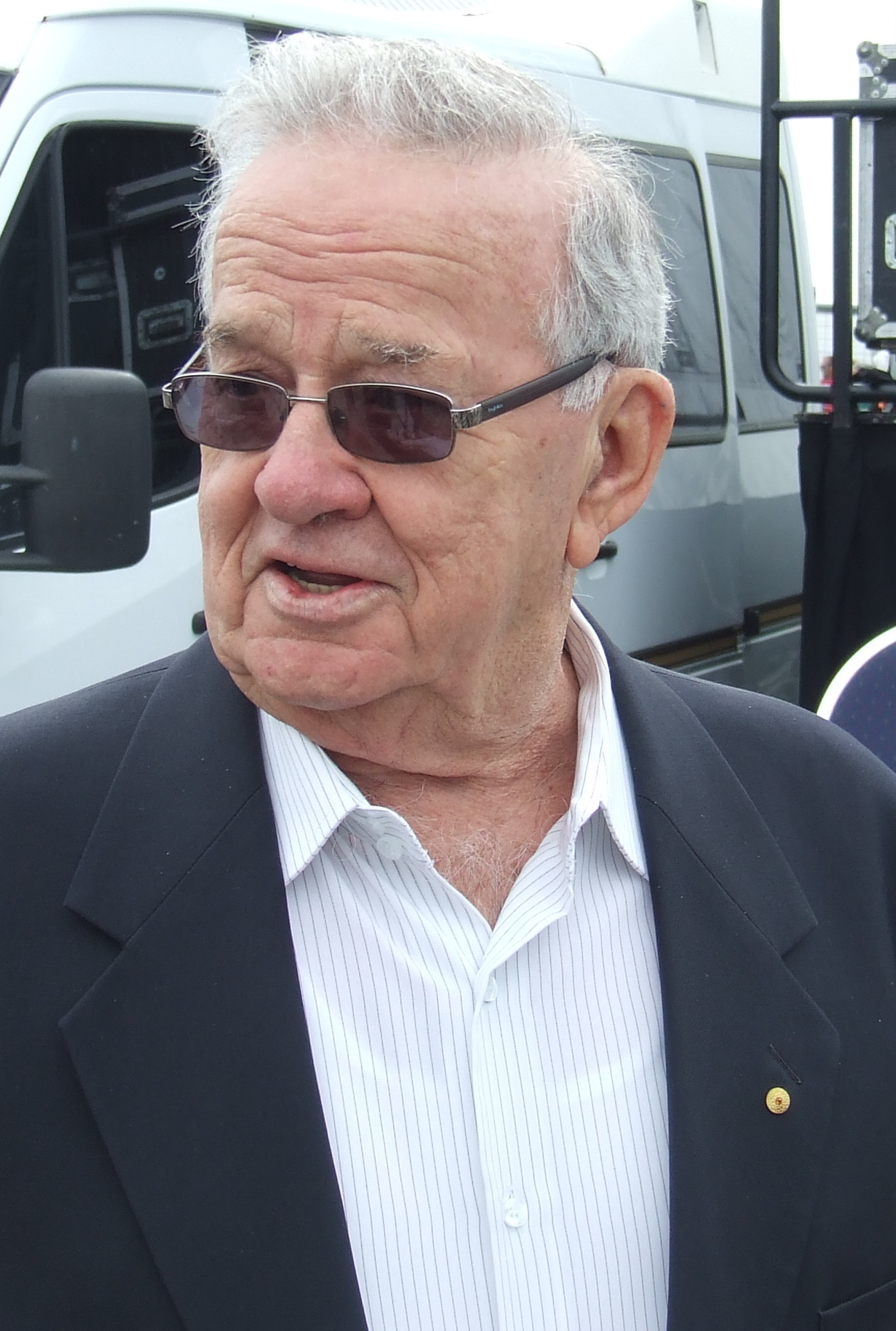
- Hielscher in 2010
- Born: 1 October 1926; Eumundi, Queensland, Australia
- Died: 4 August 2025 (aged 98)
- Occupation: Public servant
- Years active: 68
- Board member of: Expo 88, Austsafe Ltd, Independent Superannuation Preservation Fund, Gladstone Special Steel Corp., Amrites Ltd, APN News & Media, Queensland Treasury Corp., Media Ltd, Metcash Ltd and Infratil Australia Ltd.
- Spouse: Mary Ellen Pelgrave (m. 1948; died 2017)
- Children: 3
- Awards: Eisenhower Fellowship, Knight Bachelor, Honorary Doctorate of Griffith University, Honorary Fellowship of the Finance & Treasury Association, Companion of the Order of Australia (AC)

Sir Leo Arthur Hielscher AC (1 October 1926 – 4 August 2025) was an Australian senior public servant and administrator. He retired on 30 June 2010 after 19 years as chairman of the Queensland Treasury Corporation. Hielscher has been acclaimed as one of the key figures responsible for transforming Queensland's economy in the late 20th century and early 21st century.

Born in Eumundi, Queensland in 1926, Leo Hielscher was educated at Brisbane State High School and University of Queensland (BComm, AAUQ). He joined the Queensland Public Service in 1942. He was the Under Treasurer of Queensland for 14 years (1974–1988) and before that, 10 years as Deputy Under Treasurer. He was then appointed Chairman of the Queensland Treasury Corporation Advisory Board in 1988. In 1991, the advisory board became the Queensland Treasury Corporation Board and Hielscher was appointed its inaugural chairman.

Sir Leo had more than fifty years' experience in the areas of government, the banking and finance industry, domestic and global financial markets, superannuation industry and as an independent Company Director.

Sir Leo was also the inaugural Chairman of Austsafe Ltd (an industry Superannuation fund); Chairman of the Independent Superannuation Preservation Fund, and the Queensland Health Reform Advisory Panel, a Commissioner of the Local Government Reform Commission and a Director of the American Australian Association Ltd. As a Company Director, Hielscher had considerable experience at Board level and had been associated with a number of public and private sector Boards.

He was awarded an Eisenhower Fellowship in 1973, a Knight Bachelor in 1987, an Honorary Doctorate of Griffith University in 1993, and a Companion of the Order of Australia (AC) in 2004.

On 16 May 2010, the Queensland Government led by Anna Bligh renamed the bridge known as the Gateway Bridge and its newly constructed duplicate the Sir Leo Hielscher Bridges.

== Personal life and death ==
Sir Leo was married to Mary Ellen Pelgrave in 1948 until her death in 2017. They had three children, Barry Allan (deceased 1967), Ross (deceased 2023), Kerri, and three grandchildren, Claire, Emily and Lyndon.

Sir Leo Hielscher died on 4 August 2025, at the age of 98.
