= Deagon Deviation =

Road in Brisbane, Australia

Deagon Deviation Queensland

General information
- Type: Road
- Length: 5.9 km (3.7 mi)
- Route number(s): State Route 26

Major junctions
- South end: Braun Street (State Route 26) Deagon
- Gateway Motorway; Bracken Ridge Road
- North end: Houghton Highway (State Route 26) Brighton

Location(s)
- Major suburbs: Sandgate, Bracken Ridge

Deagon Deviation is a major road in Brisbane, Queensland, Australia. It provides part of the road connection between the Brisbane CBD and Redcliffe (via Sandgate Road). It is designated State Route 26 throughout its length.

The road is divided for all of its route, consisting of four lanes.

== Route description ==
From its southern end the Deagon Deviation veers west and then north, skirting the western boundary of the Deagon Racecourse and approaching the Gateway Motorway. It then runs north-north-west, between the Gateway Motorway and the Deagon Wetlands, until the motorway turns west at the Bracken Ridge Road intersection. It passes under Bracken Ridge Road and gradually turns to the north-east on its way to its northern end. For much of this section it passes between residential areas and tidal wetlands.

== History ==
Prior to the opening of the Deagon Deviation in 1979 the route from Deagon to the Houghton Highway was via a series of residential streets defined as part of State Route 27. In 1986, with the opening of the Deagon to Bruce Highway section of the then Gateway Arterial Road, a 1.9 km (1.2 mi) section of the northbound carriageway was removed, with traffic diverted to the new road. In 2018 the Deagon Deviation was re-opened as a separate road to the Gateway Motorway, extended from the motorway to Braun Street.

== Major intersections ==
The entire road is in the Brisbane local government area.

Location	km	mi	Destinations	Notes
Deagon	0	0.0	Depot Road (State Route 27) – south–west – Bracken Ridge / Fitzgibbon; Board Street (State Route 27) – north–east – Sandgate; Braun Street (State Route 26) – south – Boondall	Southern end of Deagon Deviation
Deagon	0.25	0.16	Gateway Motorway (M1) – south – Boondall	Northbound exit to Gateway Motorway southbound. No other entries or exits.
Deagon	0.9	0.56	Gateway Motorway (M1) – from south – Boondall	Northbound entry from Gateway Motorway northbound. No other entries or exits. This entry ramp is 1.1 km (0.7 mi) long and incorporates five overpass bridges.
Sandgate	1.1	0.68	Gateway Motorway (M1) – south – Boondall	Southbound exit to Gateway Motorway southbound. No other entries or exits. This exit ramp is 1.0 km (0.6 mi) long and incorporates one overpass bridge.
Bracken Ridge / Sandgate / Brighton tripoint	1.9– 2.3	1.2– 1.4	Bracken Ridge Road – west – Bracken Ridge / east – Sandgate	This intersection does not include any direct access to or from the Gateway Motorway, but traffic travelling in either direction on the Gateway Motorway can access Bracken Ridge Road from nearby intersections and proceed to this intersection, from where travel in either direction on the Deagon Deviation is available.
Brighton	5.9	3.7	Beaconsfield Terrace (State Route 27) – south – Sandgate / Houghton Highway (State Route 26) – north – Clontarf	Northern end of Deagon Deviation. State Route 26 continues north as Houghton Highway.
1.000 mi = 1.609 km; 1.000 km = 0.621 mi: Incomplete access

== See also ==
- List of road routes in Queensland
- Redcliffe Peninsula road network
