= Metroad =

Metroads were the primary road routes serving the Sydney and Brisbane metropolitan areas from the 1990s to the early 2010s. The Metroads formed a network of radial and circumferential routes throughout the cities, simplifying navigation. Metroads have been progressively phased out in both Sydney and Brisbane, replaced by alphanumeric route numbers. Brisbane is the only city currently retaining the Metroad system.

== History ==
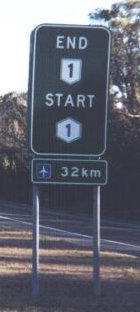
Former National Route 1 and Metroad 1 route markers at Waterfall, NSW in 2005.

Historically, National Routes passed through city centres and formed some of the main thoroughfares within Australia's largest cities. However urban growth led to massive congestion in the inner city areas. To bypass these centres, new roads were either constructed or main suburban roads were linked together to form ring roads linking one National Route to the other. The earliest scheme was adopted in Sydney in 1964, the Ring Road scheme. They had special markers for identification.

Intra-urban navigation was made increasingly difficult by urban sprawl. Many States introduced State Route systems in the 1960s, 1970s, and 1980s, and many roads within metropolitan areas were included. This scheme was adopted by most major cities. In Sydney the State Routes superseded the Ring Road scheme. Urban freeways in Sydney and Brisbane had their own route marking scheme.

However, it was later realised that the multiplicity of urban route marking schemes led to confusion. In the 1990s, these were streamlined in the new Metroad scheme. This scheme ensures that main priority routes are clearly identified and marked. As far as possible, urban freeways are absorbed into the system. It was adopted in Sydney in 1993 and Brisbane in 1996. Metroads usually completely replaced the State Routes and National Routes along their routes; however, State Routes not on designated Metroads were usually left untampered.

Metroad routes in both Sydney and Brisbane are being replaced by alphanumeric routes. Brisbane Metroads began to be phased out around 2010, with Sydney Metroads completely phased out at the end of 2013.

As of 2015, the Department of Main Roads in Queensland have no plans to convert/decommission the remaining Metroad sections within Brisbane.

== List of Metroads ==
=== Sydney Metroads ===
The Metroad navigation system was introduced to Sydney in 1992, with six routes (Metroads 1, 2, 3, 4, 5 and 7). The scheme was extended in 1998–1999 with the signposting of Metroads 6, 9 and 10 (there was never a Metroad 8). All Metroads in Sydney were completely replaced in 2013 with equivalent alphanumeric road markers.

==== Former Metroads ====
Map of Major Sydney arterial routes (before 2013)

- Metroad 1 – Wahroonga to Waterfall via the M1 Eastern Distributor and the city of Sydney – Replaced by M1 and A1
- Metroad 2 – Artarmon to Windsor via the Lane Cove Tunnel and M2 – Replaced by M2 and A2
- Metroad 3 – Blakehurst to Mona Vale via Hurstville, Olympic Park, Ryde, Macquarie Park and St Ives – Replaced by the A3
- Metroad 4 – Sydney to Lapstone via Parramatta Road and the M4 – Replaced by the M4 and A4
- Metroad 5 – Sydney Airport to Campbelltown via the M5 – Replaced by the M5 and M31 Hume Motorway
- Metroad 6 – Heathcote to Carlingford via Bankstown, Lidcombe and Silverwater – Replaced by the A6
- Metroad 7 – Casula to Wahroonga via the Cumberland Highway – Replaced by A28 and M7
- Metroad 9 – Campbelltown to Windsor – Replaced by the A9
- Metroad 10 – North Sydney to Mona Vale via Mosman and Dee Why. – Replaced by A8

Sections of Metroads 1, 2, 5, and 7 formed the Sydney Orbital Network circumnavigating the Sydney metropolitan area.

=== Brisbane Metroads ===
Brisbane's Metroad system employed odd numbers for north-to-south alignments and even numbers for east-to-west alignments. Most Metroads have since been completely or partially replaced with equivalent alphanumeric road markers. Brisbane is the only city currently retaining the Metroad system.

==== Current Metroads ====
- Metroad 2 – Rocklea to Mackenzie via Granard Road, Riawena Road, Kessels Road, and Mt Gravatt–Capalaba Road
- Metroad 5 – Toowong to Kedron via Mount Coot–Tha Road, Frederick Street, Rouen Road, Boundary Road, Macgregor Terrace, Jubilee Terrace, Elimatta Drive, Stewart Road, Wardell Street, South Pine Road, and Stafford Road

==== Former Metroads ====
- Metroad 1 – M1 - End of Pacific Motorway (Tugun) to Cooroy
- Metroad 2 – Cunningham Highway (National Highway 15)/Warrego Highway (National Highway A2) Junction to Gateway Motorway (Metroad 1)
- Metroad 3 – Pacific/Gateway Motorway Junction (Metroad 1) to Gympie Arterial Road/Gateway Motorway Junction (Metroad 1)
- Metroad 4 – Ipswich/Logan Motorway Junction (Metroad 2) to Pacific/Gateway Motorway Junction (Metroad 1)
- Metroad 5 – Ipswich Motorway (Metroad 2) to Gympie Road (Metroad 3)
- Metroad 6 – Logan/Gateway Motorway Junction (Metroad 4) to Pacific Motorway (Metroad 1)

== See also ==
- Highways in Australia
