= Logan Motorway =

Motorway in Queensland, Australia

Logan Motorway Queensland
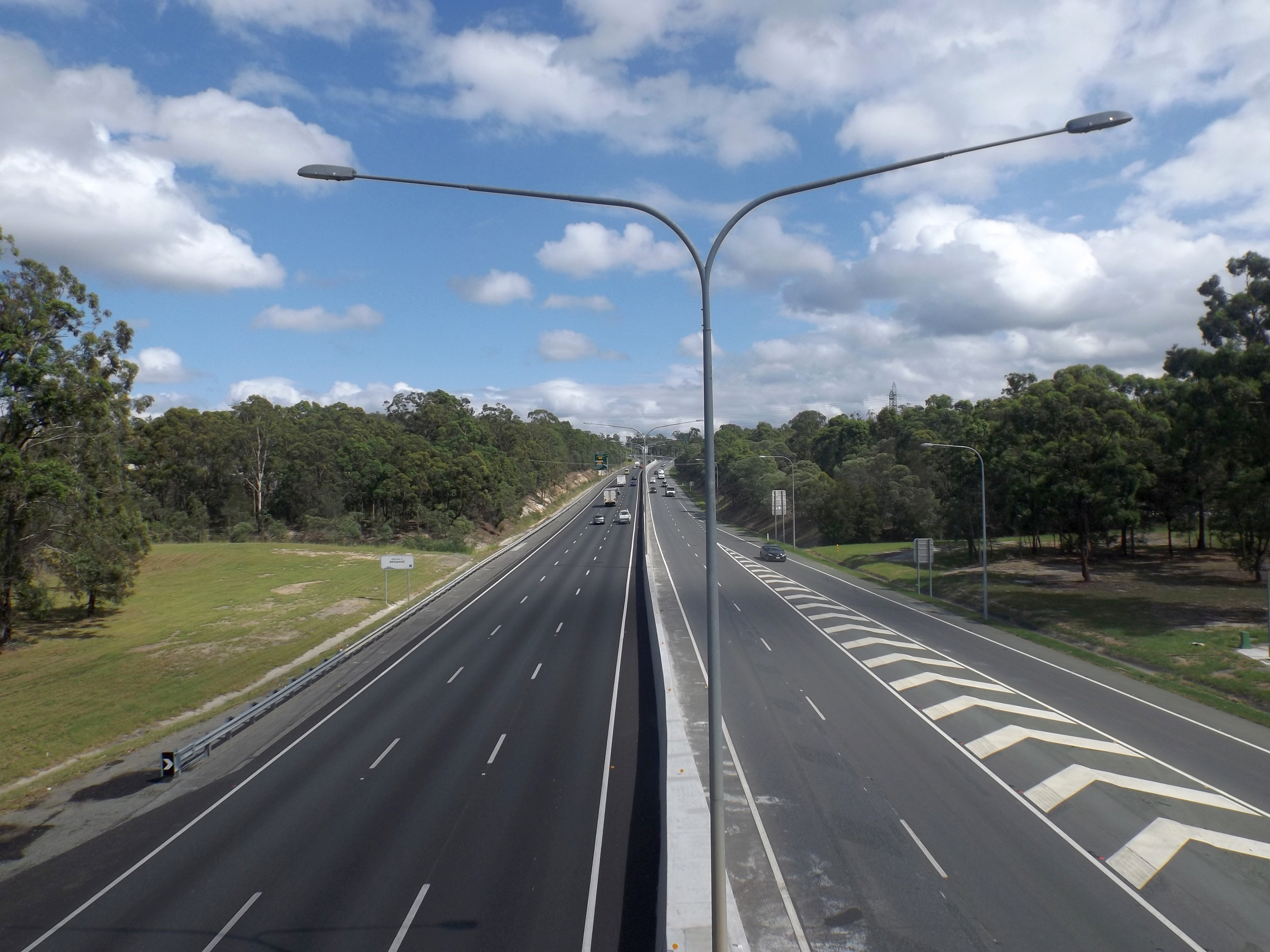
- Logan Motorway

General information
- Type: Motorway
- Length: 30.3 km (19 mi)
- Route number(s): M2; (Gailes – Forest Lake); M2; (Forest Lake – Drewvale); M6; (Drewvale – Loganholme)
- Former route number: Metroad 4; (Gailes – Drewvale); Metroad 6; (Drewvale – Loganholme)

Major junctions
- West end: Ipswich Motorway; Gailes, Queensland
- Centenary Motorway; Mount Lindesay Highway; Gateway Motorway
- East end: Pacific Motorway; Loganholme, Queensland

Location(s)
- Major suburbs / towns: Loganholme, Meadowbrook, Loganlea, Drewvale, Larapinta, Forrest Lake, Gailes

Highway system
- Highways in Australia; National Highway • Freeways in Australia; Highways in Queensland

The M2/M6 Logan Motorway is a 30-kilometre toll road between Ipswich and the M1 or Pacific Motorway at Loganholme, and the Gateway Motorway, providing access to the Gold Coast on the eastern seaboard and to the rural areas of the Darling Downs to the west. The M6 portion runs from the Pacific Motorway to the junction with the Gateway Motorway at Drewvale, where it then becomes the M2, continuing on to merge with the Ipswich Motorway at Gailes.

The road is operated and owned by Transurban Queensland. Most of this road was formally Metroad 4 prior to the Gateway Motorway extension in 1997.

The road was used by an average of 203,000 vehicles per day in 2023.

== History ==
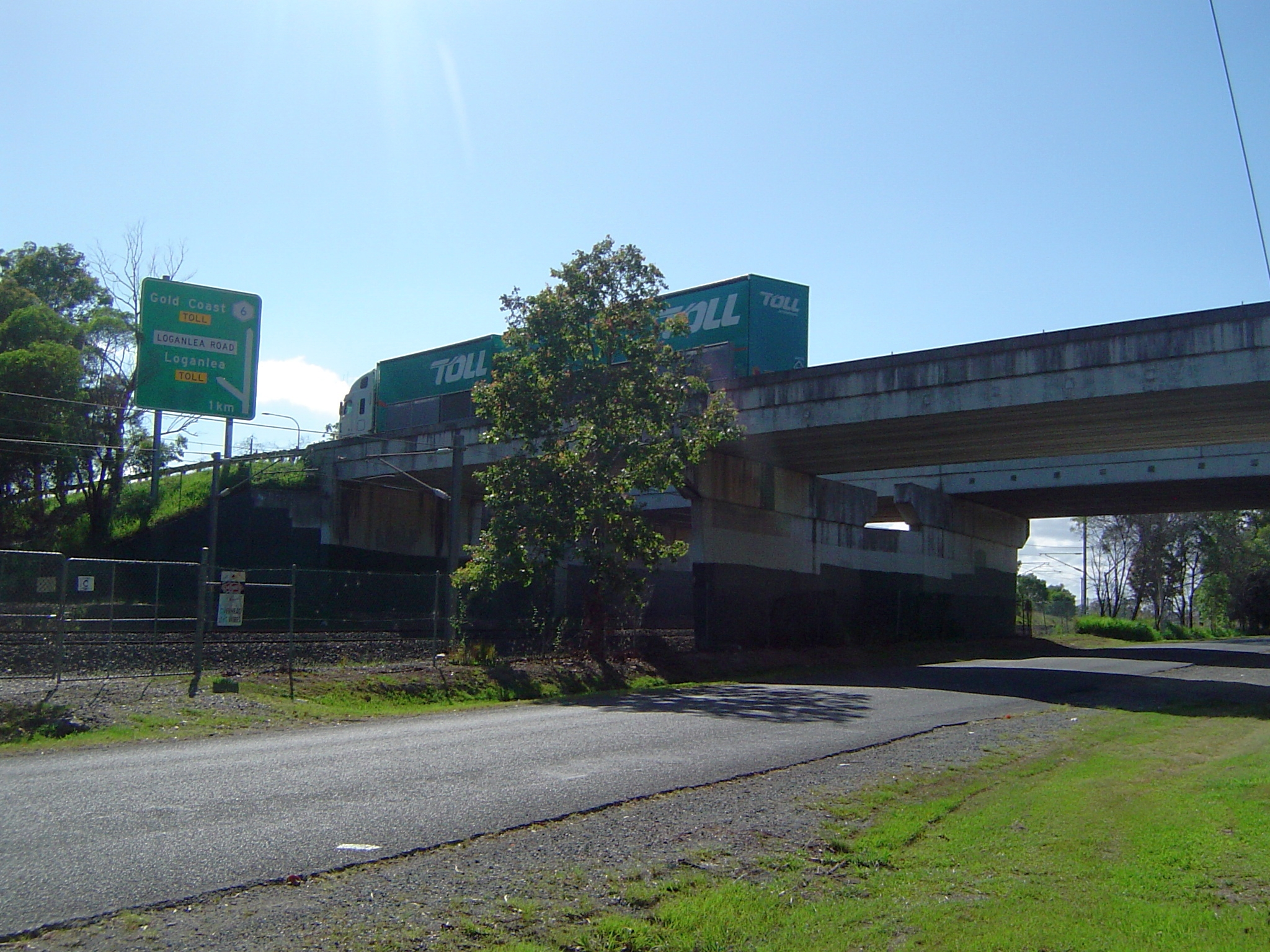
Motorway bridge at Loganlea, 2013

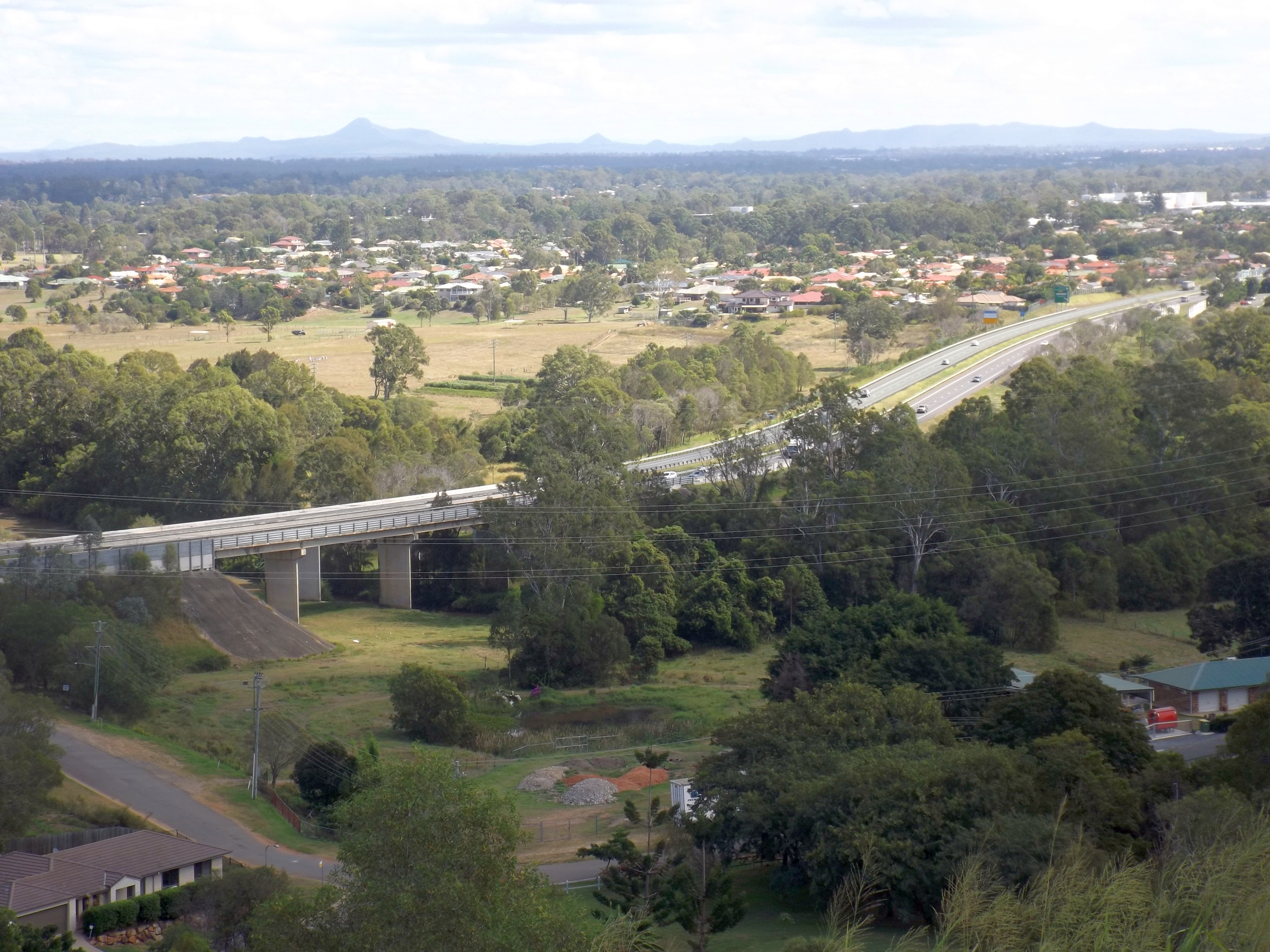
View south east from Tanah Merah, 2016

The Logan Motorway Act of 1987 permitted a franchise period of 30 years from completion of construction. The original owner was the Logan Motorway Company Ltd, later a company of Queensland Motorways. Russell Hinze attended a ceremony at Loganlea for the turning of the first sod in the construction of the Logan Motorway in October 1987.

It originally opened as a two-lane motorway on 13 December 1988, and was upgraded to four in two stages. The first stage of the duplication (Ipswich Motorway to Wembley Road) was completed in December 1996, followed by the second (Wembley Road to Pacific Motorway) on 23 May 2000. The Gateway Motorway extension opened in May 1997.

Toll booths at Wembley Road were removed in April 1997. Too many heavy vehicles were avoiding the toll by using Compton Road.

In December 2020, a man on the Logan Motorway was shot dead by police as he approached them with a knife in his hand.

=== Upgrade ===
In 2015, the road was deemed to be a traffic bottleneck. It was exceeding its planned capacity with up to 60,000 vehicles per day using the motorway. Late in the same year it was announced that Transurban would upgrade the Logan Motorway . It underwent a $450 million upgrade constructed from 2016 through to 2019. The upgrade, known as the Logan Enhancement Project, included upgrades to the Logan Motorway and Gateway Motorway:

- widening Gateway Motorway to three lanes in each direction from Compton Road to Logan Motorway and new south-facing ramps at Compton Road
- widening Logan Motorway to up to four lanes in each direction between Wembley Road and Beaudesert Road / Mount Lindesay Highway
- relocating the Logan Motorway on and off-ramps at Wembley Road
- new underpass from Beaudesert Road southbound to Logan Motorway westbound
- new service roads between Gateway Motorway and Beaudesert Road / Mount Lindesay Highway, bypassing the Logan Motorway
- the upgrades funded from an increase in Class 4 (commercial truck tolls)

== Tolls ==
The road is operated and owned by Transurban Queensland. The state continued to own the road and bridge infrastructure. Electronic free-flow tolling was implemented in 2009.

Tolls on the Logan Motorway were originally due to expire 30 years after opening, in 2018. In April 2011, the tolls were extended to 2051 as a result of the transfer of Queensland Motorways' tollways to the Queensland Investment Corporation (QIC).

The motorway has three toll points:

- Loganlea toll point: east of Loganlea Road, and the eastbound exit and westbound entry ramps to / from Loganlea Road
- Heathwood toll point: west of Stapylton Road, and the westbound exit and eastbound entry ramps to / from Stapylton Road
- Paradise Road toll point: westbound exit and eastbound entry ramps to / from Paradise Road

Additionally, all traffic between the Logan Motorway and Gateway Extension must pass through the Kuraby or Compton Road toll points of the Gateway Extension. This means travel on any section of Logan Motorway between Stapylton Road and Loganlea Road incurs two tolls (a combination of any Gateway Motorway or Logan Motorway tolls). The short sections of Logan Motorway between Ipswich Motorway and Centenary Motorway and between Drews Road and Pacific Motorway are toll-free.

Toll prices as of 1 July 2025
Toll road		Class 1 (Motorcycles)	Class 2 (Cars)	Class 3 (Light Commercial Vehicles)	Class 4 (Heavy Commercial Vehicles)	Toll increase	Toll concessionaire	Expiry of toll concession
Logan Motorway	Loganlea toll point	$1.09	$2.19	$3.29	$7.53	Annually on 1 July, by CPI	Transurban Queensland (Note: Under a long-term concession agreement with the state) (62.5% owned by Transurban)	31 December 2051
Logan Motorway	Heathwood and Paradise Road toll points	$1.80	$3.61	$5.40	$12.43	Annually on 1 July, by CPI	Transurban Queensland (62.5% owned by Transurban)	31 December 2051

== Exits and interchanges ==
LGA	Location	km	mi	Exit	Destinations	Notes
Brisbane–Ipswich boundary	Wacol–Gailes boundary	0	0.0		Ipswich Motorway (State Route M2) west – Ipswich, Toowoomba	Western motorway terminus: continues as Ipswich Motorway westbound; no access to Ipswich Motorway north east bound or from Ipswich Motorway south west bound
Brisbane–Ipswich boundary	Wacol–Gailes boundary	0.5	0.31	25	Brisbane Road – Goodna, Redbank Plains	Westbound exit and eastbound entrance
Brisbane–Ipswich boundary	Carole Park	0.8	0.50	24	Formation Street – Camira, Carole Park	Eastbound exit and westbound entrance
Brisbane–Ipswich boundary	Carole Park	2	1.2	23	Boundary Road – Carole Park, Wacol	Westbound exit and eastbound entrance
Brisbane	Forest Lake	3.4	2.1	22	Centenary Motorway (State Route M5) – Springfield, Jindalee, Brisbane	No eastbound exit to M5 northbound; no westbound entrance from M5 southbound
Brisbane	Forest Lake	7	4.3	Heathwood toll point		
Brisbane	Heathwood	8.2	5.1	17	Stapylton Road (State Route 35) – Forestdale, Forest Lake	Toll points on westbound exit and eastbound entrance only
Brisbane	Larapinta	10.9	6.8	14	Paradise Road – Acacia Ridge, Forestdale	Toll points on westbound exit and eastbound entrance only
Brisbane	Parkinson–Drewvale boundary	13.9	8.6	11	Beaudesert Road – Acacia Ridge, Brisbane, Regents Park, Beaudesert	Parclo Interchange
Brisbane	Drewvale	15.8	9.8	9	Gateway Motorway (State Route M2) north – Sunshine Coast, Cairns, Brisbane Airport	Trumpet interchange; Route transition: M2 westbound, Metroad 6 eastbound
Logan	Berrinba	16.9	10.5	8	Wembley Road (State Route 50) – Browns Plains, Logan Central Wembley Road toll point was under the bridge.	
Logan	Loganlea	22.7	14.1	5	Kingston Road (State Route 95) via Jutland Street & Station Road – Bethania, Underwood	Eastbound exit and entrance via Jutland Street, westbound exit and entrance via Station Road
Logan	Meadowbrook	24.2	15.0	4	Loganlea Road – Daisy Hill, Loganlea	Westbound exit and entrance
Logan	Meadowbrook	24.5	15.2	4	University Drive to Loganlea Road – Daisy Hill, Loganlea	Eastbound exit and entrance
Logan	Meadowbrook	25.2	15.7	Loganlea toll point		
Logan	Tanah Merah–Loganholme boundary	29.3	18.2	1	Drews Road	
Logan	Loganholme	29.8	18.5		Pacific Highway frontage road – Loganholme, Brisbane	Eastbound exit is via Drews Road ramp
Logan	Loganholme	30.3	18.8		Pacific Motorway (State Route M1) south – Gold Coast, Ballina, Gold Coast Airport	Eastern terminus: continues as Pacific Motorway southbound; no access to M1 northbound or from M1 southbound
Electronic toll collection; Incomplete access; Route transition

== See also ==
- Freeways in Australia
- Freeways in Brisbane
