= Port of Brisbane Motorway =

Motorway in Brisbane, Australia

Port of Brisbane Motorway Queensland
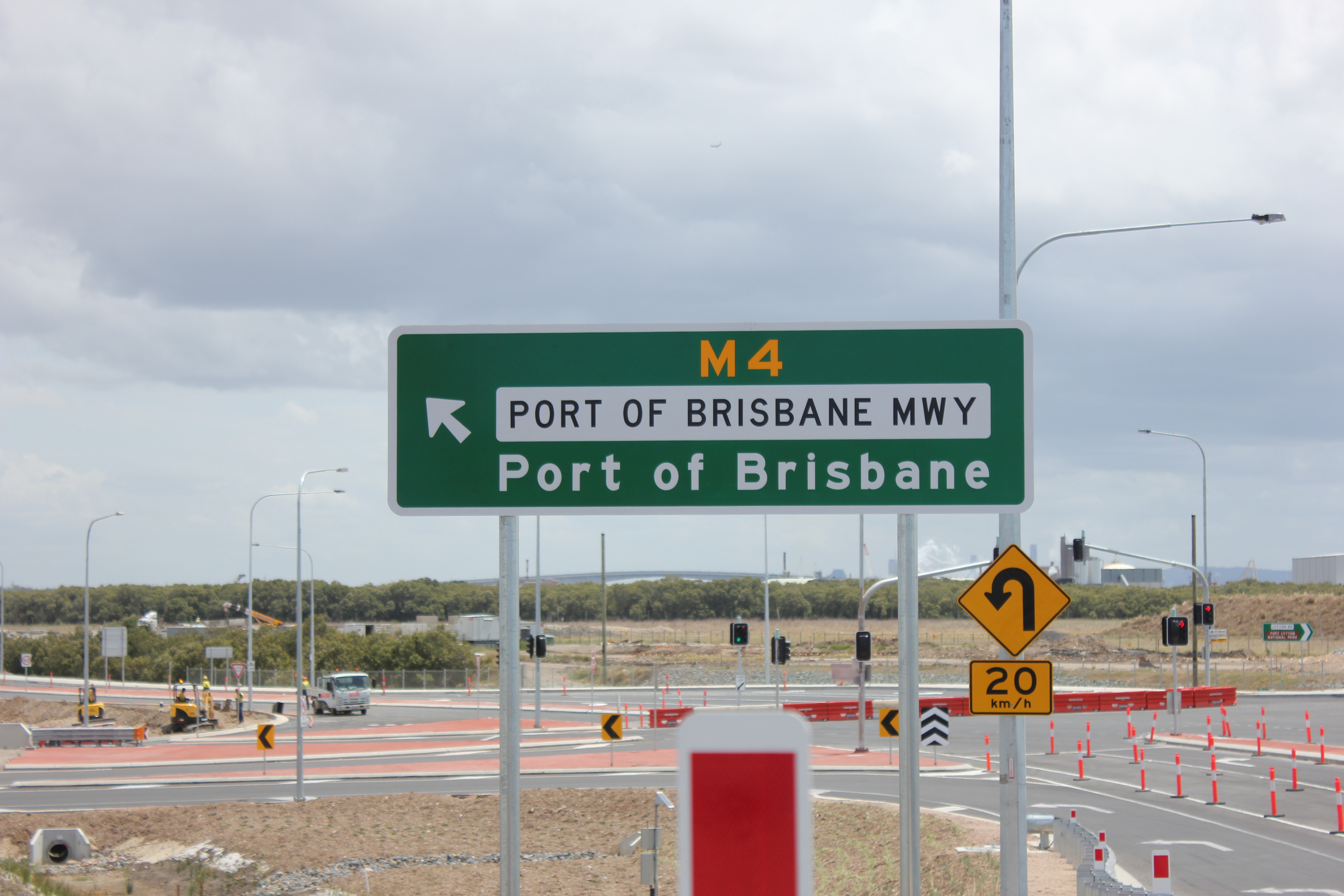

General information
- Type: Motorway
- Length: 6.9 km (4.3 mi)
- Route number(s): M4

Major junctions
- SW end: Gateway Motorway; Murarrie
- Lytton Road; Pritchard Street
- NE end: Port Drive; Lytton

Location(s)
- Major suburbs / towns: Hemmant

Highway system
- Highways in Australia; National Highway • Freeways in Australia; Highways in Queensland

Port of Brisbane Motorway is a motorway which connects the Port of Brisbane to the Gateway Motorway. Stage 1 was opened in December 2002. The motorway was built to take freight traffic off Lytton Road, with about 4,000 vehicles travelling to the Port of Brisbane in 2002. Stage 1 cost A$196 million and was finished six months ahead of schedule and A$20 million under budget. The Port of Brisbane Motorway holds the M4 motorway designation.

Stage 2 includes a three kilometre extension of the existing motorway through to Pritchard Street. Construction commenced in April 2011 with completion in February 2013. The project was named Port Connect, an A$385 million upgrade.

A further stage of upgrade was completed on the connecting roads to the port. The project was named Port Drive Upgrade, an A$110 million upgrade from the eastern end of the Port of Brisbane Motorway through to Port Gate. Construction commenced in Q3 2016 and completed mid 2018. It included duplication of Port Drive, an overpass at Kite Street intersection and duplication of Lucinda Drive.

== Interchanges ==
The entire motorway is in the City of Brisbane local government area.

| Location | km | mi | Destinations | Notes |
|---|---|---|---|---|
| Murarrie | 0 | 0.0 | Gateway Motorway (M1) – Ipswich, Gold Coast, Sunshine Coast, Brisbane Airport | South–western motorway terminus; semi-directional T interchange |
| Murarrie | 0.9 | 0.56 | Lytton Road (State Route 24) – Murarrie, Brisbane | No exit westbound |
| Lytton | 3.8 | 2.4 | Lytton Road (State Route 24) / Lindum Road (State Route 30) – Hemmant, Wynnum | No north–eastbound entrance; south–westbound entrance via looped ramp |
| Lytton | 5.3 | 3.3 | Lytton Road (State Route 24 south) / Pritchard Street (State Route 24 east) – Lytton, Wynnum | North–eastbound exit and entrance only |
| Lytton | 6.2 | 3.9 | Pritchard Street (State Route 24) – Lytton, Wynnum | South–westbound exit and entrance only |
| Lytton | 6.9 | 4.3 | Port Drive north–east – Port of Brisbane | North–eastern motorway terminus: continues as Port Drive |
1.000 mi = 1.609 km; 1.000 km = 0.621 mi: Incomplete access

=== Road diagram ===
The accompanying diagram shows the interchanges with and overpasses of the Port of Brisbane Motorway.

== Gallery ==
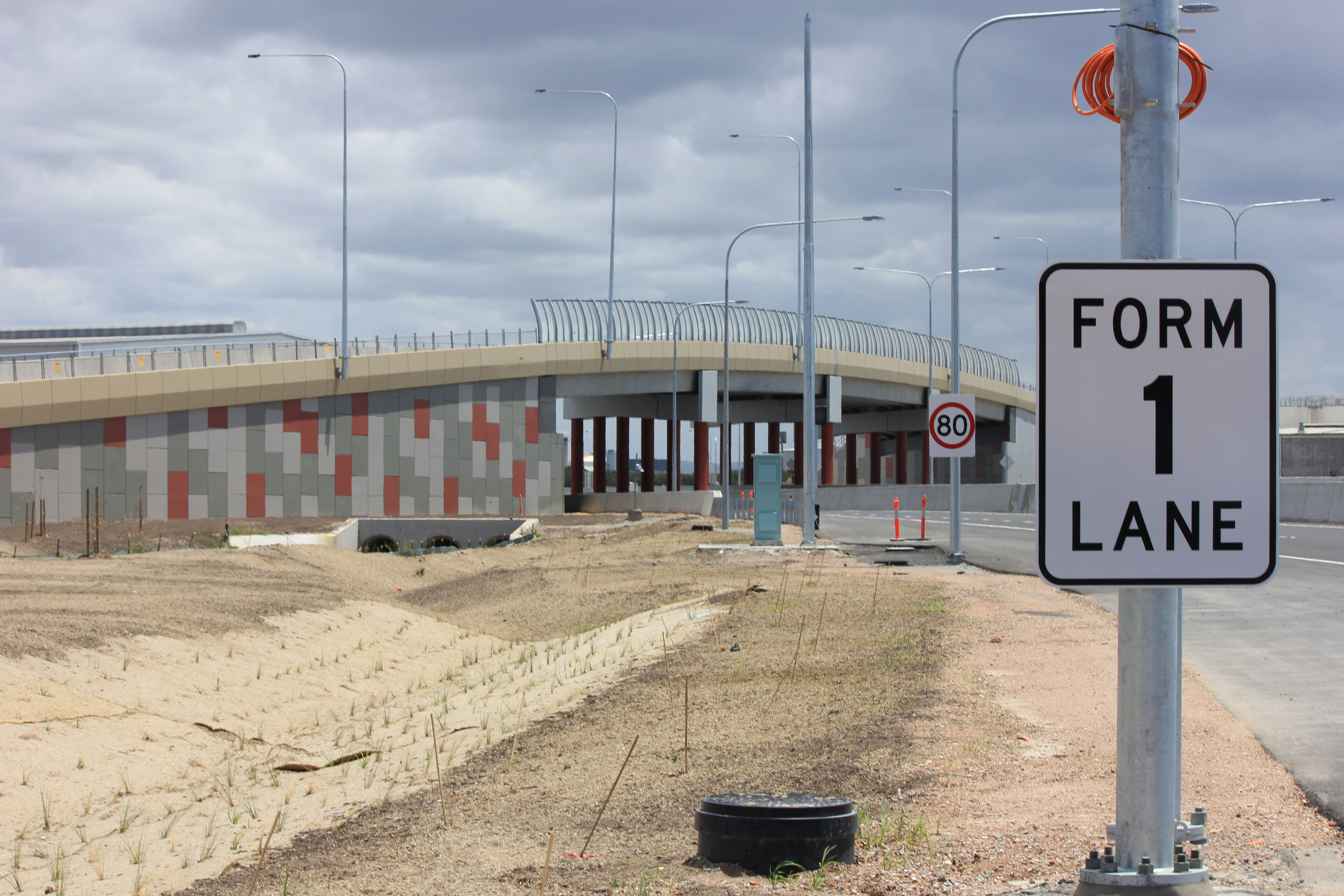
Port of Brisbane Motorway.

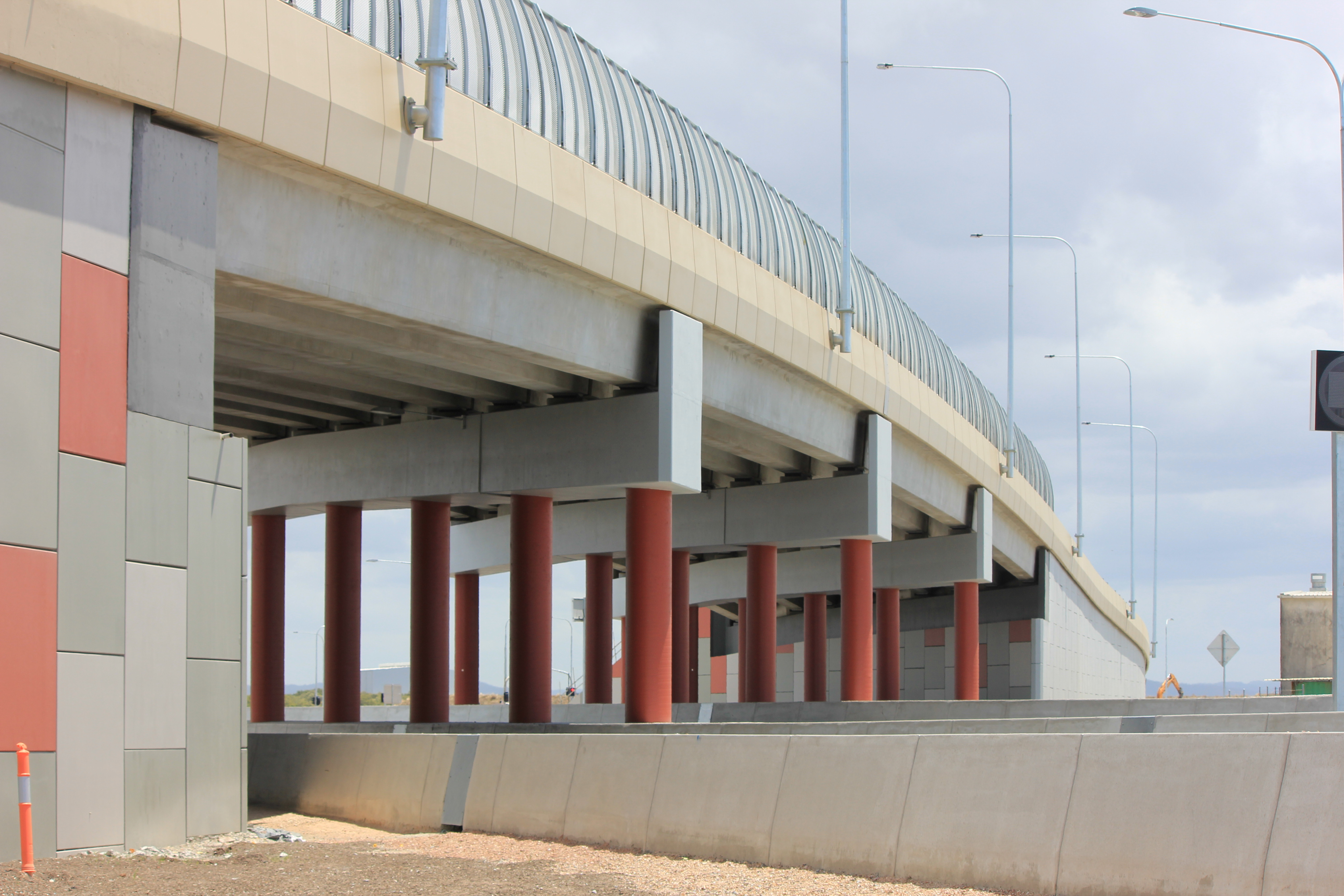
Pritchard St Overpass.

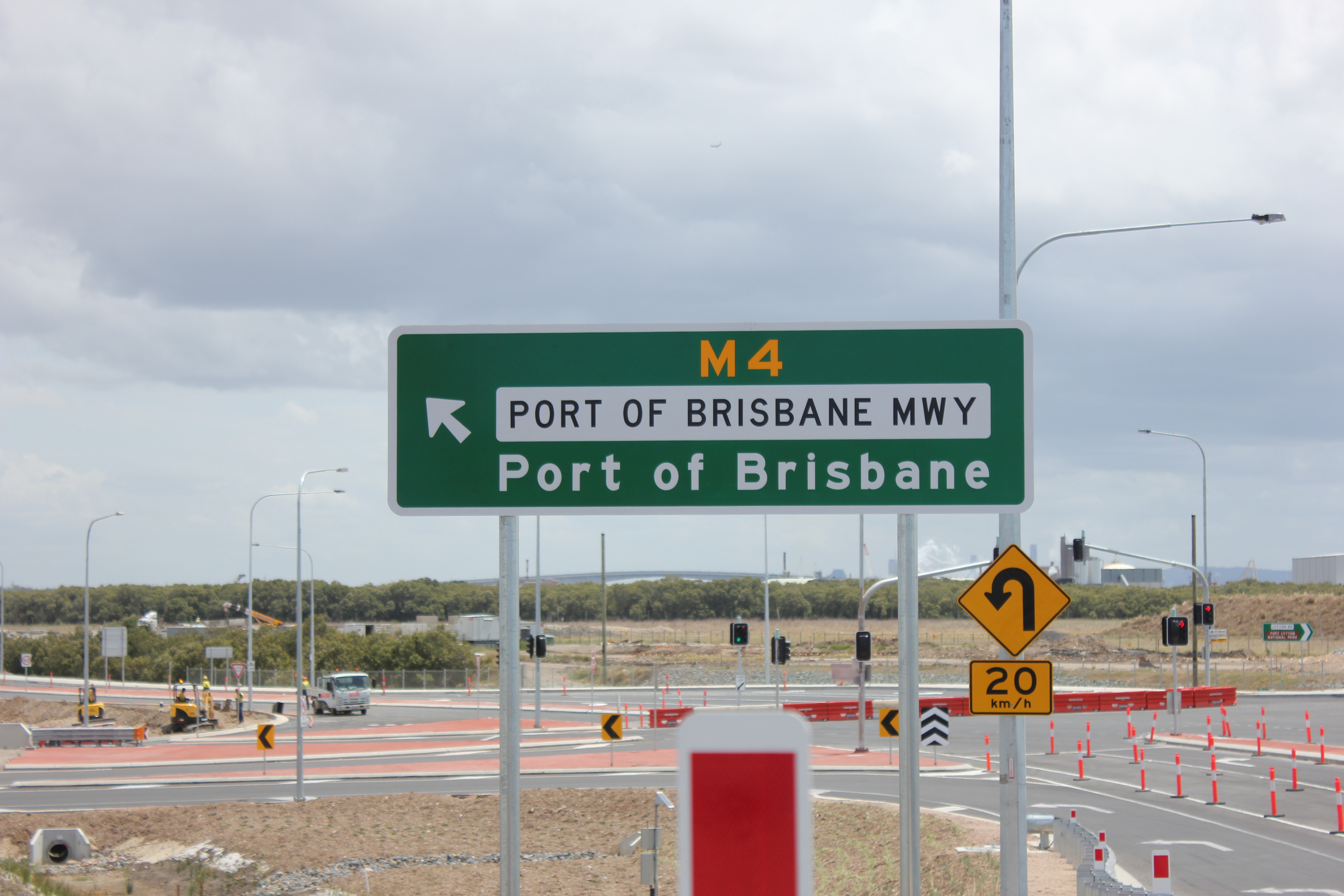
Port of Brisbane Motorway sign.

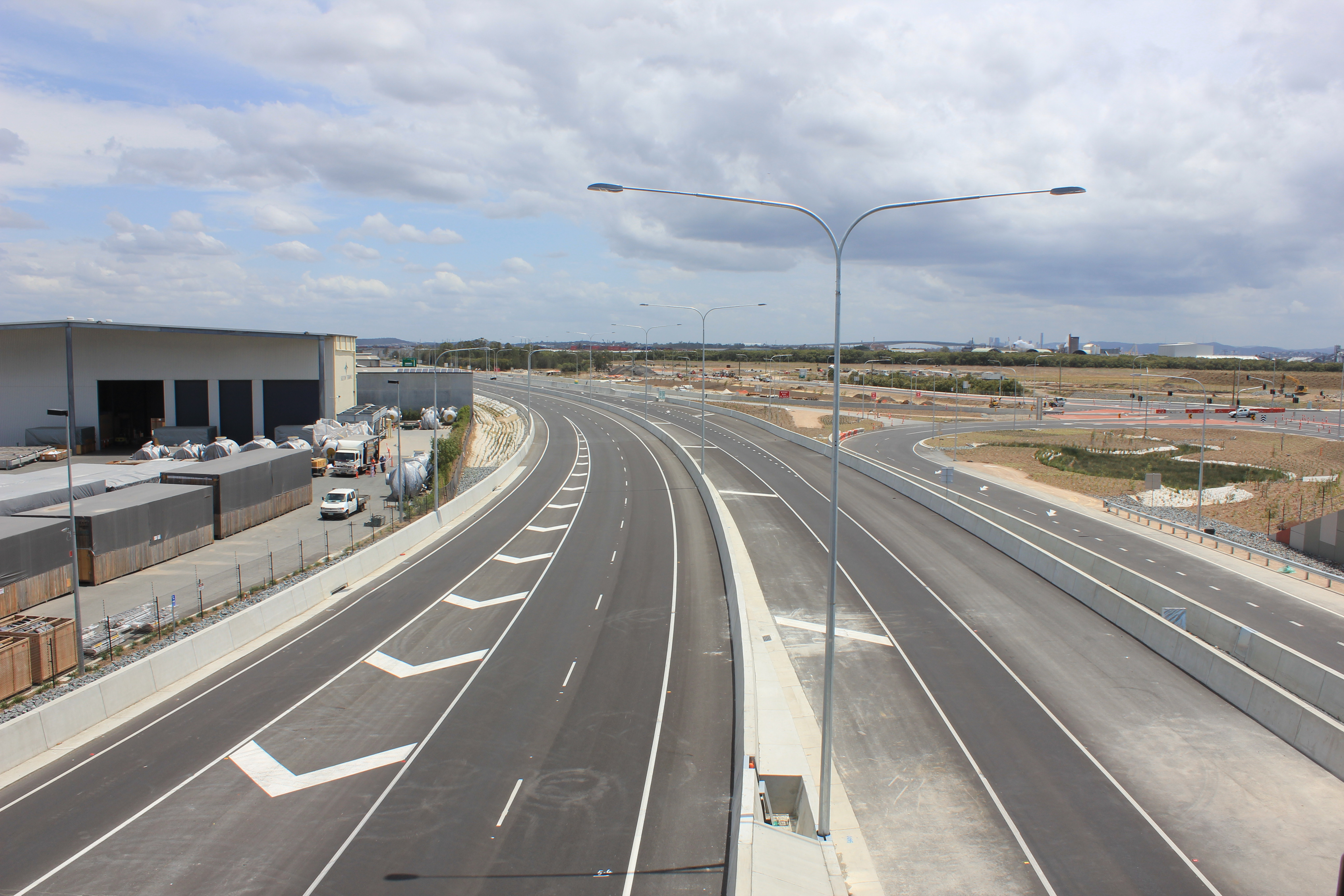
Port of Brisbane Motorway south view from overpass.

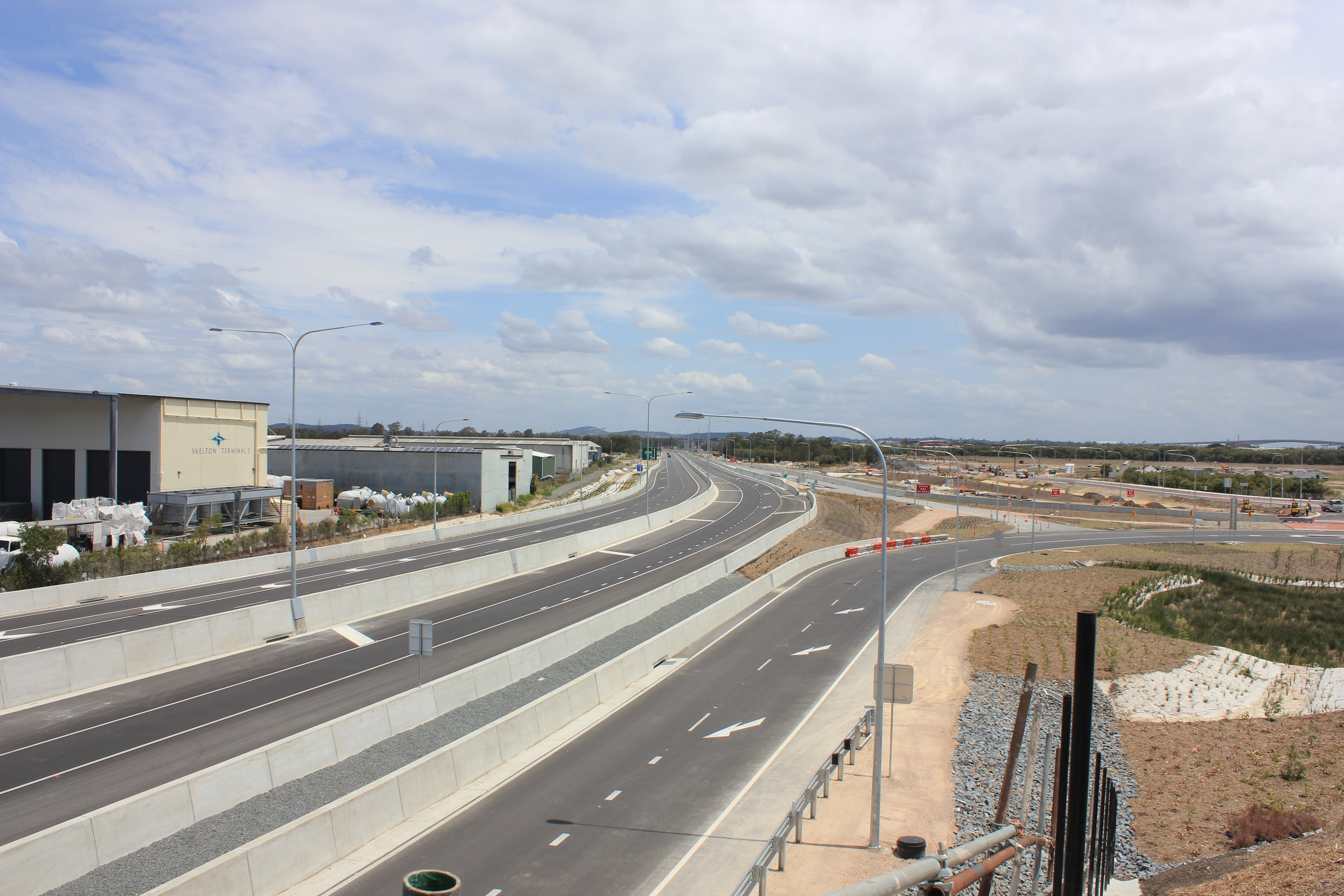
Port of Brisbane Motorway north view from overpass.

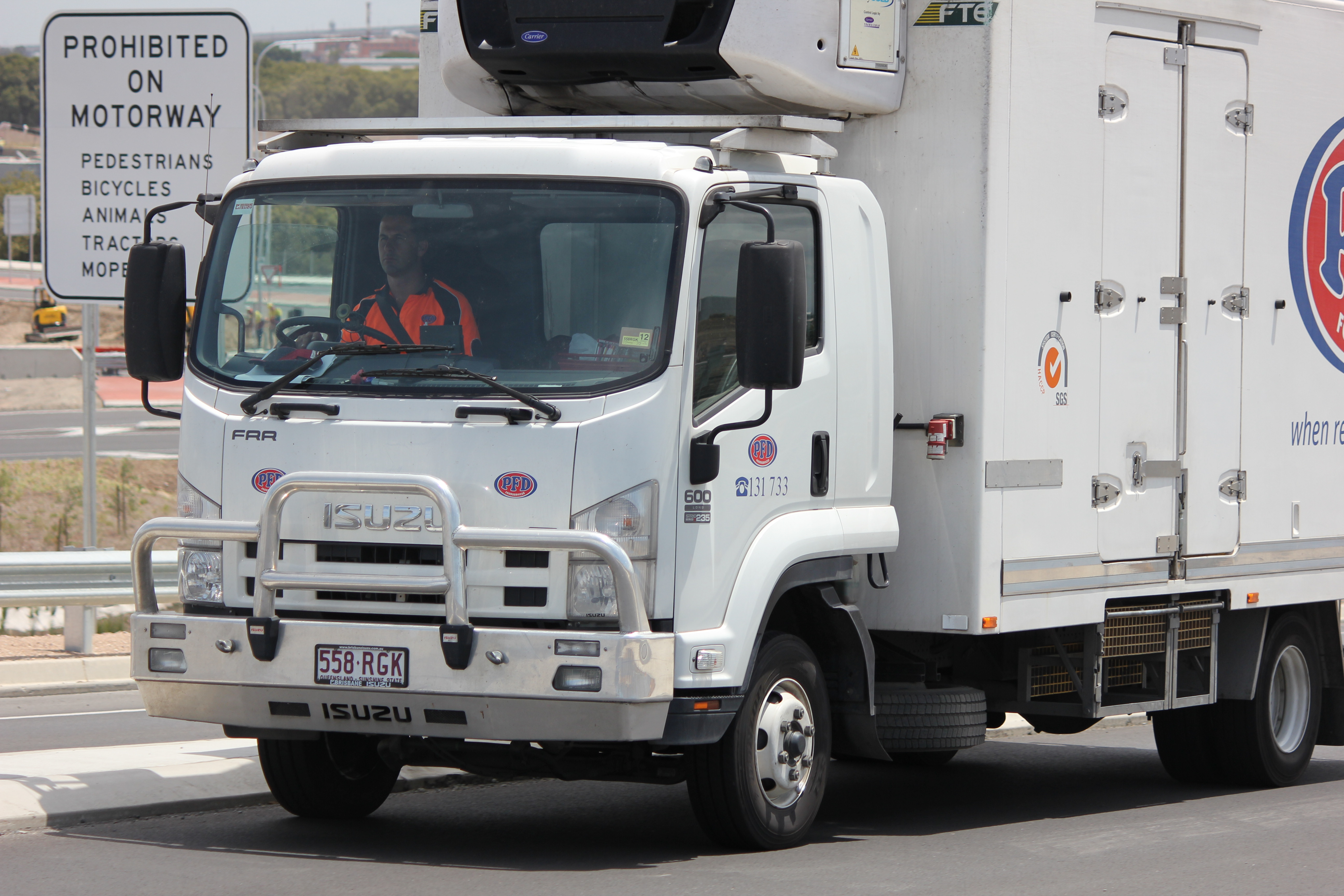
Port of Brisbane Motorway. A truck using the Motorway.

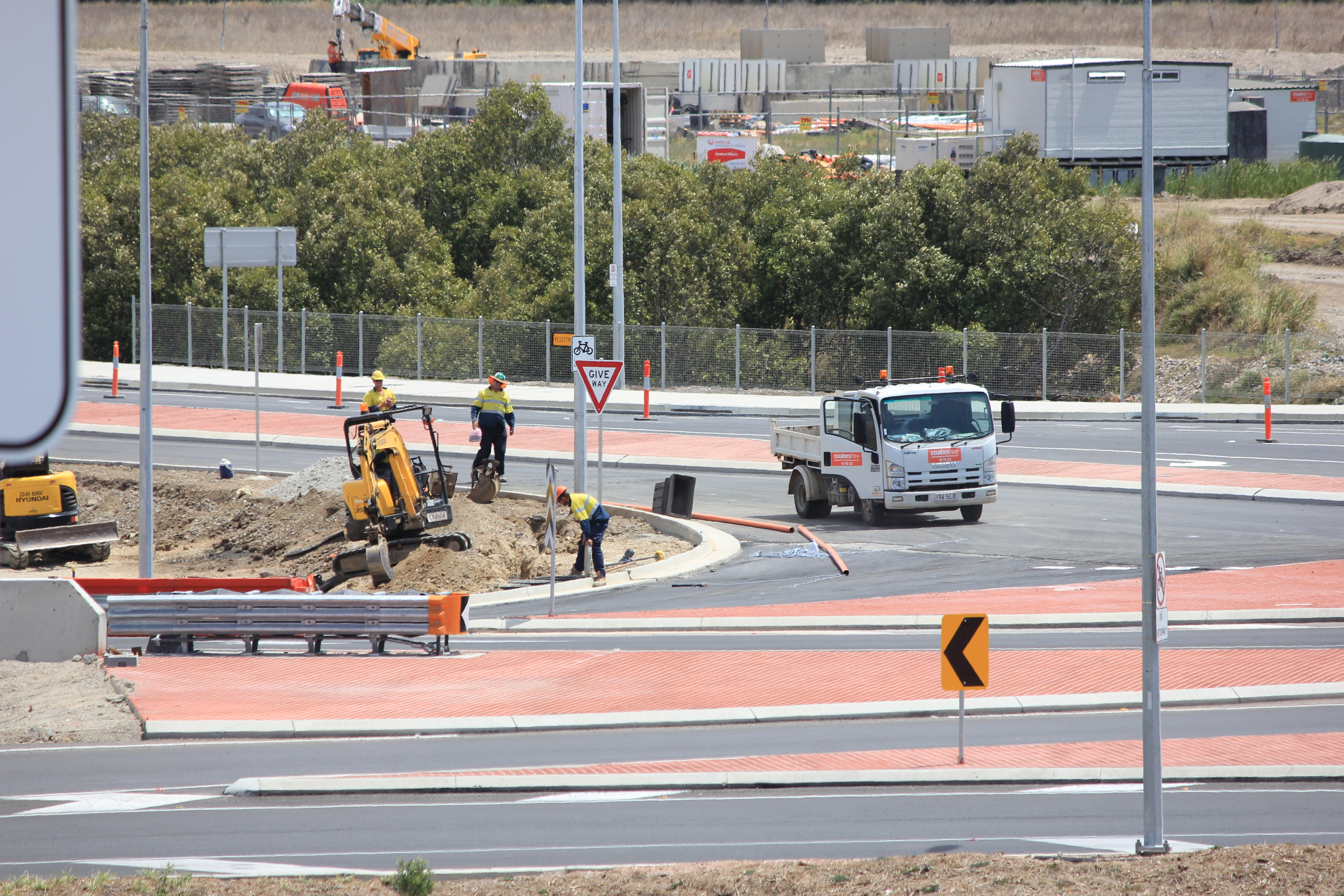
Road workers completing motorway

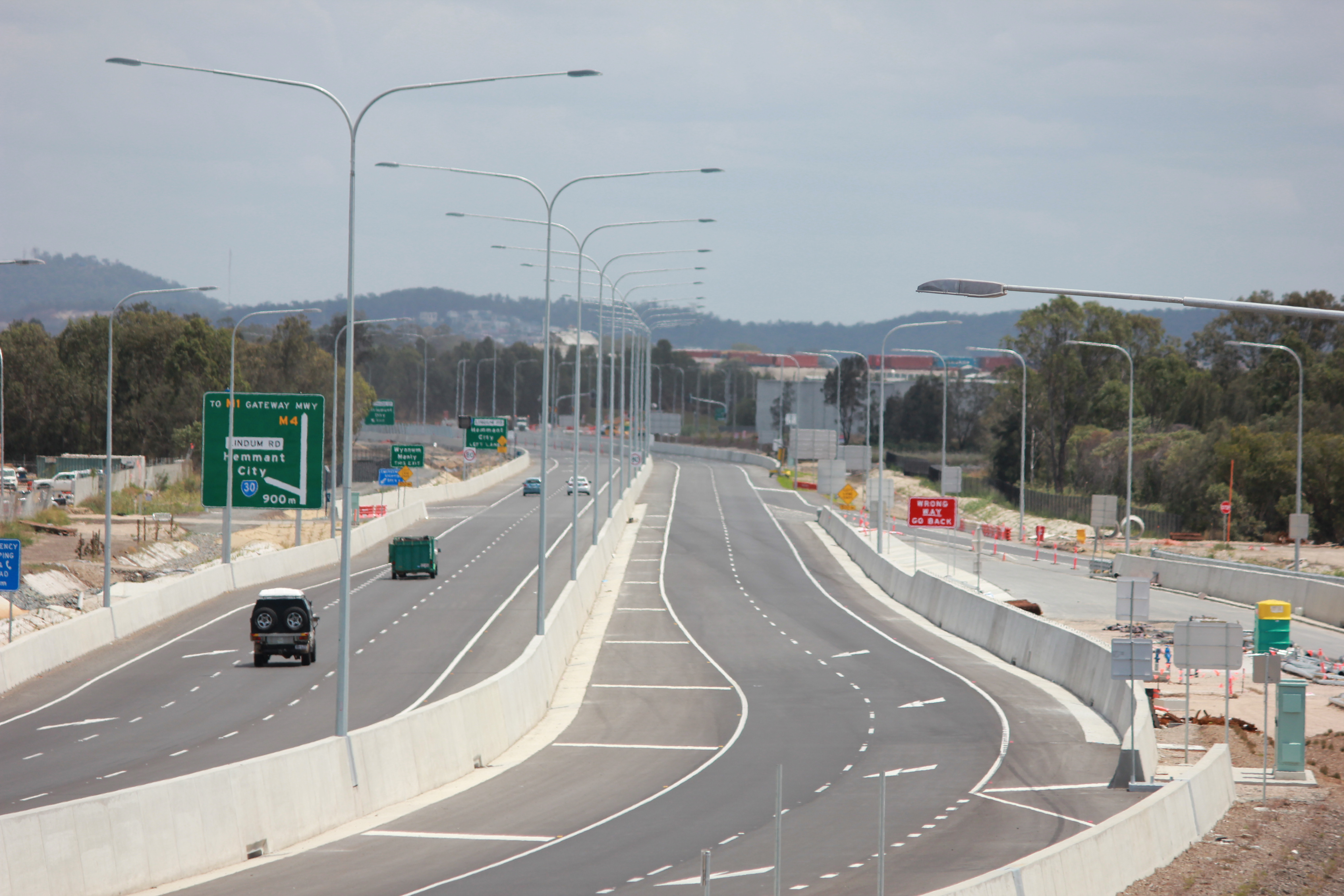
Port of Brisbane Motorway

== See also ==
- Freeways in Australia
- Freeways in Brisbane
